= Summit Historic District =

Historic district in Rhode Island, United States

- U.S. National Register of Historic Places
- U.S. Historic district
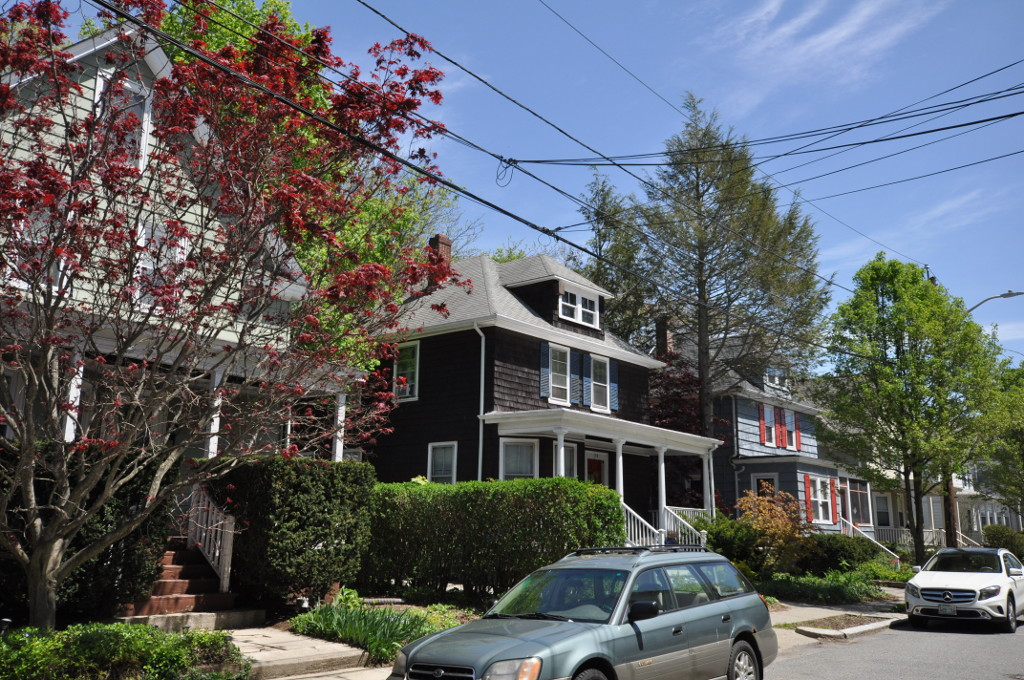

- Location within Rhode Island Location within the United States
- Location: Providence, Rhode Island
- Coordinates: 41°50′53″N 71°23′58″W
- Built: 1915
- Architectural style: Mid 19th Century Revival, Late Victorian
- NRHP reference No.: 03000495
- Added to NRHP: September 23, 2003

The Summit Historic District is a residential historic district in northeastern Providence, Rhode Island. It is bounded on the east by Summit Avenue, the south by Rochambeau Avenue, the west by Camp Street, and the north by Memorial Road and Creston Way. It contains 155 houses, most of which were built between 1918 and 1938. The area was annexed by Providence in 1874 and platted out of farmland in 1916, and represents a typical suburban development of the period. Most of these houses are set on lots between 4,500 and 5,500 square feet in size, although there are some double lots. Single family homes predominate, with a number of two- and three-family houses present. Architecturally the houses are heterogeneous, with styles ranging from the late Queen Anne to the Colonial and Tudor Revivals. The only significant non-residential structure in the district is Temple Beth Shalom at 120 Rochambeau Avenue, which does not contribute to its significance.

The district was listed on the National Register of Historic Places in 2003.

== See also ==
- National Register of Historic Places listings in Providence, Rhode Island
