= Stedman & Fuller Manufacturing Company Complex =

- U.S. National Register of Historic Places
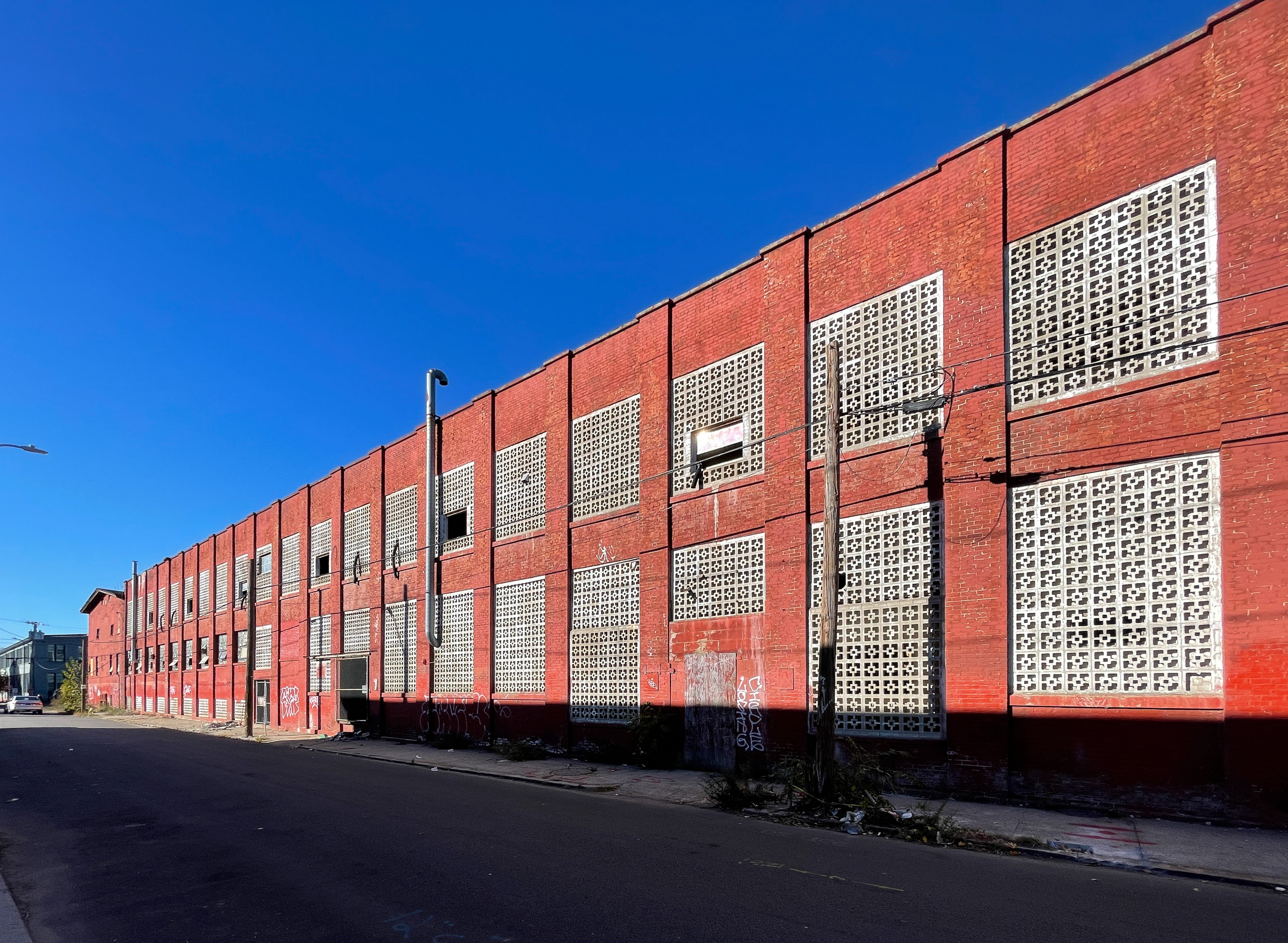

- Location within Rhode Island Location within the United States
- Location: Providence, Rhode Island
- Coordinates: 41°48′38″N 71°25′35″W
- Built: 1885, ca. 1920, ca. 1930
- Architect: Unknown
- Architectural style: Italianate
- NRHP reference No.: 100006644
- Added to NRHP: June 14, 2021

The Stedman & Fuller Manufacturing Company Complex also known as the Bourn Rubber Company, Philips-Baker Rubber Company Complex is a historical manufacturing complex at 49 Westfield Street in the West End neighborhood of Providence, Rhode Island. The complex consists of three connected buildings constructed in three phases between 1885 and c. 1930.

It was added to the National Register of Historic Places in 2021 for its association with locally significant manufacturing companies.

== See also ==
- National Register of Historic Places listings in Providence, Rhode Island
