= Rhodes Street Historic District =

Historic district in Rhode Island, United States

- U.S. National Register of Historic Places
- U.S. Historic district
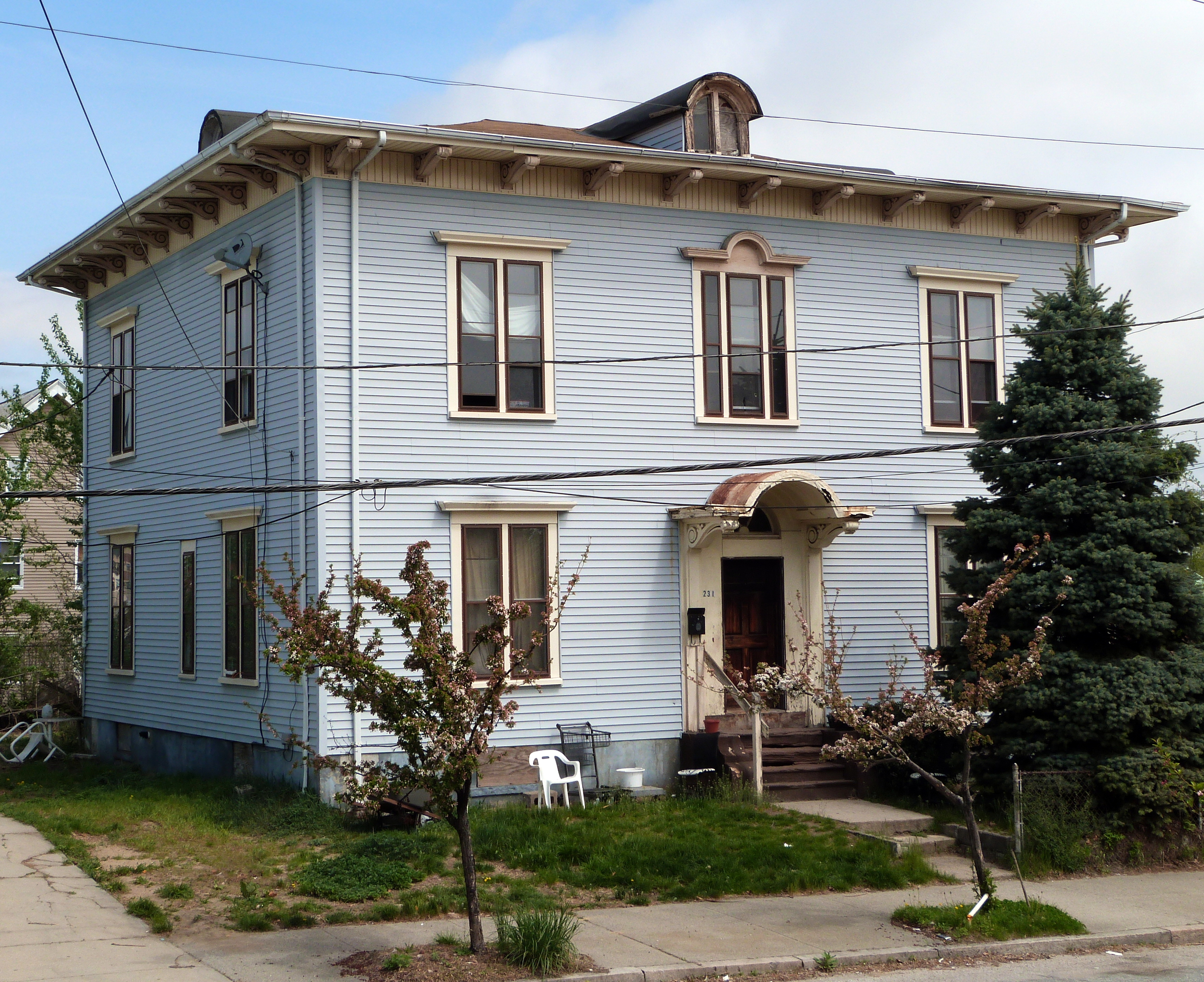
- The William C. Rhodes House (ca. 1860) in the Rhodes Street Historic District

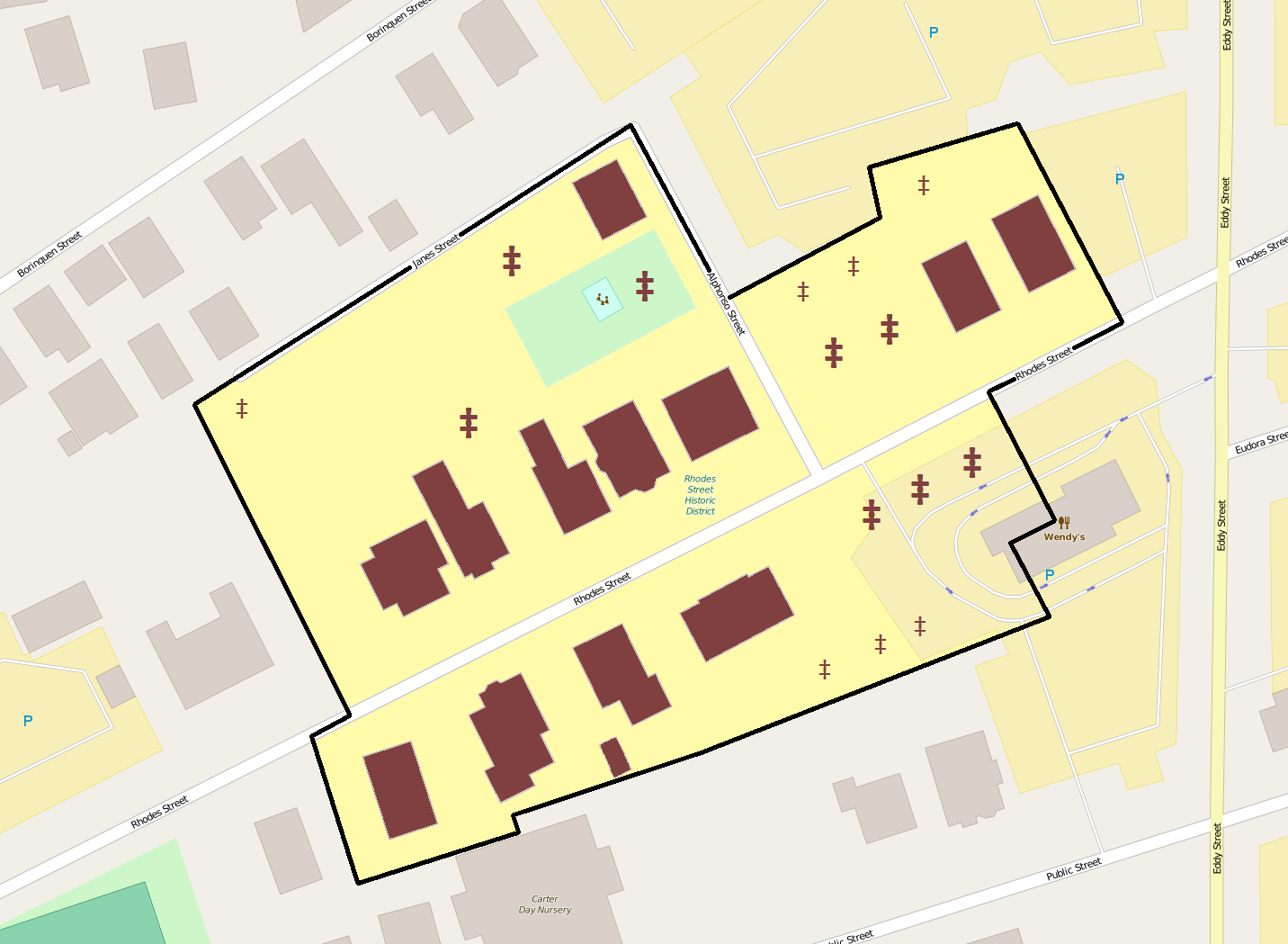
- The Rhodes Street Historic District boundaries in Providence
- Location: Providence, Rhode Island
- Coordinates: 41°48′28″N 71°24′32″W
- Area: 4 acres (1.6 ha)
- Architectural style: Late Victorian
- NRHP reference No.: 82000004
- Added to NRHP: November 12, 1982

Rhodes Street Historic District is a residential historic district encompassing one block of Rhodes Street in southern Providence, Rhode Island, along with the dead-end Janes and Alphonso Streets. This area has a well-preserved collection of stylish 19th century houses, built roughly between 1850 and 1895. South Providence did not see much residential development until after industry began moving into the area. These houses were built on land that was originally part of the Rhodes family farm, and were built for managers of nearby industrial facilities. Architecturally the houses represent a cross-section of styles popular in the period.

The district was listed on the National Register of Historic Places in 1982.

== See also ==
- National Register of Historic Places listings in Providence, Rhode Island
