= Wesleyan Avenue Historic District =

Historic district in Rhode Island, United States

- U.S. National Register of Historic Places
- U.S. Historic district
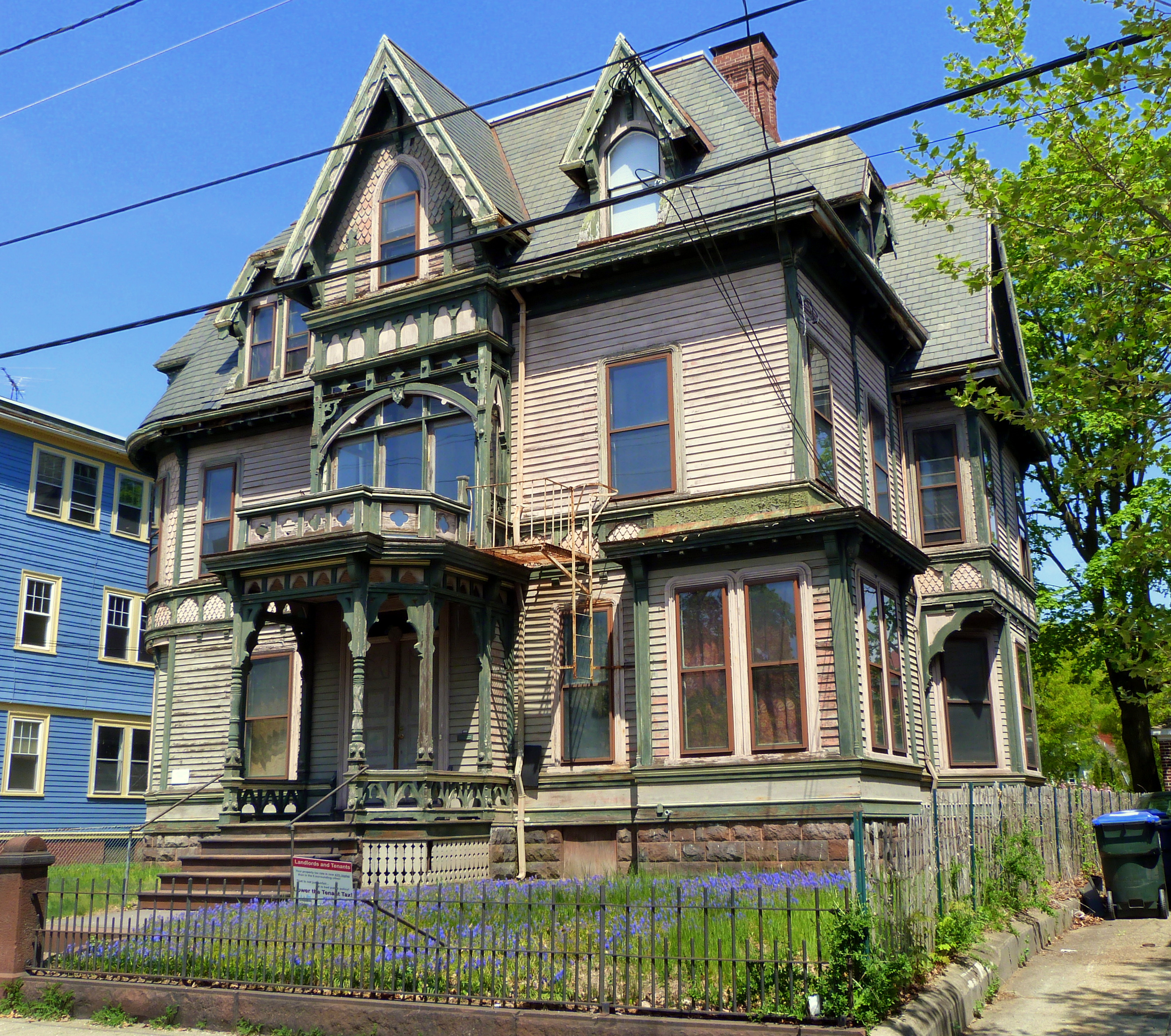

- Location within Rhode Island Location within the United States
- Location: Roughly bounded by Arlington and Laurel Aves., Weymouth St., Blackstone Boulevard, Butler Ave., and Angell and S. Angell Sts., Providence, Rhode Island
- Coordinates: 41°48′28″N 71°25′11″W
- Area: 5 acres (2.0 ha)
- Architectural style: Late Victorian, Second Empire
- NRHP reference No.: 82000011
- Added to NRHP: November 23, 1982

The Wesleyan Avenue Historic District is a residential historic district in the Elmwood section of Providence, Rhode Island. It includes 25 houses, on a one-block section of Wesleyan Avenue between Taylor and Broad Streets, with a few of them on the two end streets. They are large two-plus story wood-frame houses, set on modest lot, all of which were built between 1875 and 1900. The houses are in a diversity of styles popular at that time, including Second Empire, Stick style, and Queen Anne. The district includes what is one of Providence's finest Stick style houses, the Samuel Darling House at 53 Wesleyan Avenue. It was built in 1885, and displays a wealth of applied wood work, decorative shingling, and intricately carved porch details.

The district was listed on the National Register of Historic Places in 1982.

== See also ==
- National Register of Historic Places listings in Providence, Rhode Island
