= Elmgrove Gardens Historic District =

Historic district in Rhode Island, United States

- U.S. National Register of Historic Places
- U.S. Historic district
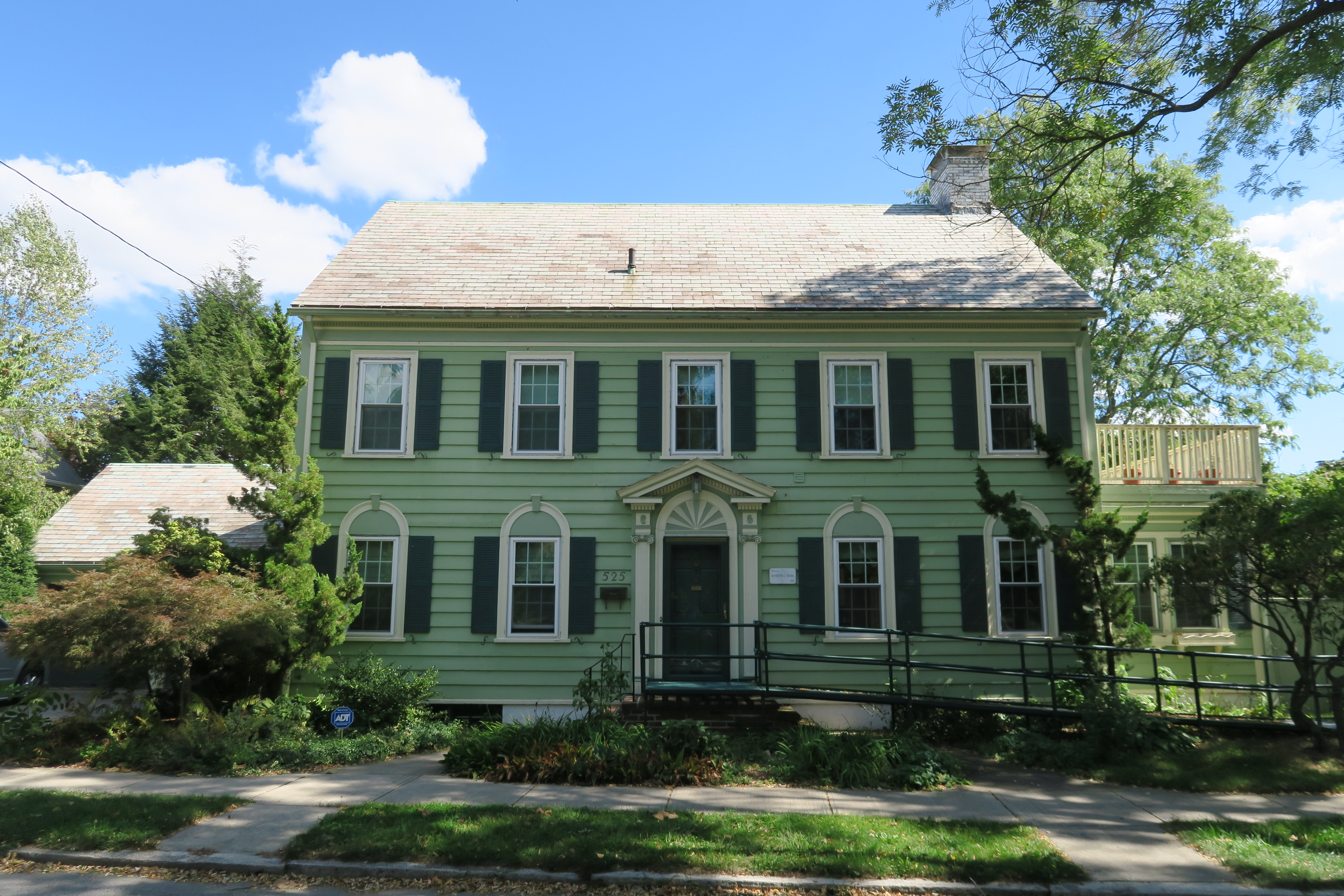
- Built by Rossiter C. Stark

- Location within Rhode Island Location within the United States
- Location: Providence, Rhode Island
- Coordinates: 41°50′45″N 71°23′30″W
- Area: 18 acres (7.3 ha)
- Built: 1745
- Architectural style: Mid 19th Century Revival, Late Victorian
- NRHP reference No.: 04001589
- Added to NRHP: February 2, 2005

The Elmgrove Gardens Historic District is a residential historic district in northeastern Providence, Rhode Island, United States. It is bounded on the north by Rochambeau Avenue, on the south by Woodbury Street, on the east by Cole Avenue, and on the west by Morris Avenue. This area was developed most heavily between 1908 and 1948, and is a well-preserved example of an early automotive suburban residential area. Most of the houses in the district are either 1-1/2 or 2-1/2 stories in height, and are built in an architecturally diverse variety of styles. The district also includes to 18th-century farmhouses (at 287 and 317 Rochambeau Avenue), reminders of the area's agrarian past.

The district was listed on the National Register of Historic Places in 2005.

== See also ==
- National Register of Historic Places listings in Providence, Rhode Island
