= National Register of Historic Places listings in Providence, Rhode Island =

Location of Providence in Providence County, Rhode Island

This is a list of the National Register of Historic Places listings in Providence, Rhode Island.

This is intended to be a complete list of the properties and districts on the National Register of Historic Places in Providence, Rhode Island, United States. Latitude and longitude coordinates are provided for many National Register properties and districts; these locations may be seen together in an online map.

There are 439 properties and districts listed on the National Register in Providence County, including 15 National Historic Landmarks. The city of Providence is the location of 171 these properties and districts, including 12 National Historic Landmarks; they are listed here. Properties and districts located in the county's other municipalities are listed separately. Two listings, the Blackstone Canal and the Norwood Avenue Historic District, extend into other parts of Providence County.

Contents: Counties in Rhode Island

Bristol | Kent | Newport | Providence (Pawtucket | Providence (city) | Woonsocket) | Washington

This National Park Service list is complete through NPS recent listings posted August 7, 2026.

This National Park Service list is complete through NPS recent listings posted August 7, 2026.

== Current listings ==
	Name on the Register	Image	Date listed	Location	Description
1	Nelson W. Aldrich House	Nelson W. Aldrich House	December 8, 1976 (#76000040)	110 Benevolent St. 41°49′30″N 71°23′46″W	Home of Aldrich, a longtime U.S. Senator. Today home of the Rhode Island Historical Society
2	All Saints Memorial Church	All Saints Memorial Church	January 7, 1980 (#80000083)	674 Westminster St. 41°49′05″N 71°25′09″W	A significant work of architect Edward Tuckerman Potter.
3	Candace Allen House	Candace Allen House	April 11, 1973 (#73000062)	12 Benevolent St. 41°49′29″N 71°24′15″W	An exemplar of the domestic architectural taste of wealthy Providence families in the 1820s
4	Zachariah Allen House	Zachariah Allen House	September 15, 1994 (#94001152)	1093 Smith St. 41°50′39″N 71°26′56″W	A well-preserved example of a transitional Georgian-Federal style house
5	America Street School	America Street School	June 18, 1987 (#87000996)	22 America St. 41°49′23″N 71°25′42″W	Demolished 1996.
6	American Brewing Company Plant	American Brewing Company Plant	June 21, 2016 (#16000395)	431 Harris Ave. 41°49′29″N 71°26′05″W	A well-preserved example of a state of the art late 19th century brewery facility
7	Andrew Dickhaut Cottages Historic District	Andrew Dickhaut Cottages Historic District	February 23, 1984 (#84001904)	114–141 Bath St., 6-18 Duke St., and 377 Orms St. 41°50′00″N 71°25′33″W	A discrete and intact collection of late 19th-century workers' housing
8	The Arcade	The Arcade	May 6, 1971 (#71000029)	130 Westminster St. and 65 Weybosset St. 41°49′25″N 71°24′39″W	First enclosed shopping mall in the United States, built 1828
9	Arnold-Palmer House	Arnold-Palmer House	January 20, 1972 (#72000034)	33 Chestnut St. 41°49′09″N 71°24′50″W	A well-preserved and fine example of late Federal architecture
10	Aylesworth Apartments	Aylesworth Apartments	November 12, 1982 (#82000133)	188–194 Broad St. 41°49′00″N 71°25′06″W	Providence's oldest known purpose-built apartments
11	William L. Bailey House	William L. Bailey House	March 7, 1973 (#73000064)	Eaton St., Providence College campus 41°50′31″N 71°26′07″W	Now known as Dominic Hall, the official residence of the Providence College president
12	Beaman and Smith Company Mill	Beaman and Smith Company Mill	April 20, 2006 (#06000299)	20 Gordon Ave. 41°48′17″N 71°24′57″W	
13	Bell Street Chapel	Bell Street Chapel	March 14, 1973 (#73000065)	5 Bell St. 41°49′07″N 71°26′12″W	
14	Beneficent Congregational Church	Beneficent Congregational Church	January 13, 1972 (#72000035)	300 Weybosset St. 41°49′11″N 71°24′51″W	The oldest church in Providence west of the Providence River] and an outstanding example of Greek Revival architecture
15	Blackstone Boulevard Realty Plat Historic District	Blackstone Boulevard Realty Plat Historic District	June 9, 1995 (#95000711)	Roughly bounded by Blackstone Boulevard, Rochambeau Ave., Holly St., and Elmgrove Ave. 41°50′54″N 71°23′24″W	
16	Blackstone Boulevard-Cole Avenue-Grotto Avenue Historic District	Blackstone Boulevard-Cole Avenue-Grotto Avenue Historic District	November 12, 2009 (#09000363)	Roughly bounded by Blackstone Boulevard and Cole, Grotto, President, and Rochambeau Aves. 41°50′27″N 71°23′08″W	
17	Blackstone Canal	Blackstone Canal	May 6, 1971 (#71000030)	From Steeple and Promenade Sts. to the Ashton Dam; also from the Ashton Dam north to the Massachusetts state line 41°55′16″N 71°25′21″W	Initial listing extended from Providence, through Pawtucket, and as far north as Lincoln; a November 1, 1991 expansion extended it to the state line; the canal itself extended into Worcester County, Massachusetts, where it is the subject of separate listings.
18	Blackstone Park Historic District	Blackstone Park Historic District	June 5, 1998 (#98000575)	Roughly bounded by the Seekonk River, Laurell Ave., Blackstone Boulevard, and S. Angell St. 41°50′02″N 71°22′56″W	
19	Charles Brackett House	Charles Brackett House	April 3, 1970 (#70000018)	45 Prospect St. 41°49′39″N 71°24′18″W	Built in 1875 by George Henry Corliss, this house is a large and monumental example of the Italian Villa style
20	George M. Bradley House	George M. Bradley House	January 13, 1972 (#72000037)	Eaton St., Providence College campus 41°50′31″N 71°26′14″W	
21	William J. Braitsch and Company Plant	William J. Braitsch and Company Plant	July 11, 2016 (#16000443)	472 Potters Ave. 41°48′05″N 71°25′28″W	
22	Brick Schoolhouse	Brick Schoolhouse	December 5, 1972 (#72000038)	24 Meeting St. 41°49′43″N 71°24′34″W	Home of one of the first free schools in the United States and the first brick schoolhouse in the city of Providence
23	Bridgham-Arch-Wilson Streets Historic District	Bridgham-Arch-Wilson Streets Historic District	September 1, 1988 (#88001433)	Roughly bounded by Lester and Bridgham Sts., Elmwood Ave., and Warren and Dexter Sts. 41°48′43″N 71°25′36″W	
24	Broadway-Armory Historic District	Broadway-Armory Historic District	May 1, 1974 (#74000047)	Providence; specifically 144-146, 148, 150, and 156-158 Broadway and 226 and 230 Dean St. 41°48′58″N 71°25′46″W	Specific boundaries represent a boundary increase of January 2, 2008
25	Brown and Sharpe Manufacturing Company Complex	Brown and Sharpe Manufacturing Company Complex	April 18, 2003 (#03000081)	Promenade, Bath, Calverly, West Park, Holden, and Brownell Sts, and Interstate 95; 41°49′48″N 71°25′15″W	
26	John Brown House	John Brown House	November 24, 1968 (#68000007)	52 Power St. 41°49′22″N 71°24′16″W	Late Georgian house of early benefactor of Brown University; one of the first large houses built in Providence's post-Revolutionary expansion
27	Morris Brown House	Morris Brown House	August 22, 1991 (#91001025)	317 Rochambeau Ave. 41°50′48″N 71°23′39″W	
28	Moses Brown School	Moses Brown School	July 24, 1980 (#80000088)	250 Lloyd Ave. 41°50′00″N 71°23′56″W	
29	Burrows Block	Burrows Block	September 5, 1990 (#90001347)	735–745 Westminster St. 41°49′05″N 71°25′15″W	
30	Butler Hospital	Butler Hospital	October 8, 1976 (#76000041)	345 Blackstone Boulevard; 41°50′35″N 71°22′54″W	
31	Calvary Baptist Church	Calvary Baptist Church	January 7, 1980 (#80000089)	747 Broad St. 41°48′13″N 71°24′29″W	
32	A. F. Cappelli Block	A. F. Cappelli Block	March 3, 1980 (#80000090)	263–265 Atwells Ave. 41°49′24″N 71°25′38″W	Exemplary of mixed-use commercial blocks constructed at the turn of the century
33	Dr. George W. Carr House	Dr. George W. Carr House	March 7, 1973 (#73000067)	29 Waterman St. 41°49′36″N 71°24′31″W	
34	Cathedral of Saints Peter and Paul	Cathedral of Saints Peter and Paul	February 10, 1975 (#75000057)	Cathedral Sq. 41°49′09″N 71°25′01″W	
35	Central Diner	Central Diner	January 13, 2010 (#09001231)	777 Elmwood Ave. 41°47′28″N 71°25′21″W	
36	Chemical Building, Fields Point Sewage Treatment Plant	Chemical Building, Fields Point Sewage Treatment Plant	January 13, 1989 (#88003106)	Ernest St. at Fields Point; 41°47′40″N 71°23′26″W	
37	Christ Episcopal Church	Christ Episcopal Church	June 30, 1976 (#76000043)	909 Eddy St. 41°48′09″N 71°24′27″W	Demolished in 2006
38	College Hill Historic District	College Hill Historic District	November 10, 1970 (#70000019)	Roughly bounded by the Providence and Seekonk Rivers, Olney, Hope, and Governor Sts., Carrington and Whittier; 41°49′35″N 71°24′12″W	Original 120 acres (0.49 km^{2}) of city of Providence, laid out by Roger Williams. Contains many well-preserved 18th- and 19th-century buildings and homes as well as Brown and the Rhode Island School of Design
39	Congdon Street Baptist Church	Congdon Street Baptist Church	June 21, 1971 (#71000032)	17 Congdon St. 41°49′42″N 71°24′25″W	
40	Copley Chambers		January 7, 2026 (#100012509)	206 Broad Street; 41°48′59″N 71°25′07″W	
41	John Corliss House	John Corliss House	May 1, 1974 (#74000049)	201 S. Main St. 41°49′23″N 71°24′24″W	A rare survivor of a major 1801 fire and one of only a few remaining houses in the area constructed prior to the American Revolution
42	Corliss-Carrington House	Corliss-Carrington House	December 30, 1970 (#70000020)	66 Williams St. 41°49′21″N 71°24′09″W	Well-preserved Adamesque-Federal style townhouse from 1812, with wrought iron columns on front facade
43	Covell Street School	Covell Street School	September 30, 1976 (#76000044)	231 Amherst St. 41°49′24″N 71°26′51″W	
44	Customhouse Historic District	Customhouse Historic District	February 20, 1975 (#75000058)	Bounded by Westminster, Exchange, Dyer, Pine, and Peck Sts. 41°49′26″N 71°24′36″W	
45	Susan S. & Edward J. Cutler House	Susan S. & Edward J. Cutler House	April 6, 2015 (#15000138)	12 Woodbine St. 41°50′45″N 71°24′18″W	
46	Davol Rubber Company	Davol Rubber Company	June 27, 1980 (#80000093)	Point and Eddy Sts. 41°49′02″N 71°24′25″W	
47	Richard Henry Deming House	Richard Henry Deming House	January 7, 1980 (#80000094)	66 Burnett St. 41°48′09″N 71°25′38″W	
48	Edward Dexter House	Edward Dexter House	June 21, 1971 (#71000033)	72 Waterman St. 41°49′37″N 71°24′15″W	
49	Jeremiah Dexter House	Jeremiah Dexter House	October 8, 1976 (#76000046)	957 N. Main St. 41°50′48″N 71°24′19″W	
50	Charles Dowler House	Charles Dowler House	February 23, 1984 (#84001955)	581 Smith St. 41°50′09″N 71°25′51″W	
51	Downtown Providence Historic District	Downtown Providence Historic District	February 10, 1984 (#84001967)	Roughly bounded by Washington, Westminster, Empire, and Weybosset Sts.; also along Friendship, Pine, and Richmond Sts.; also 250 and 254 Washington Sts. 41°49′24″N 71°24′48″W	Second and third sets of locations represent boundary increases of October 11, 2007 and July 25, 2012
52	Doyle Avenue Historic District	Doyle Avenue Historic District	February 22, 1990 (#90000104)	Doyle Ave. from N. Main St. to Hope St. 41°50′19″N 71°24′26″W	
53	Dyerville Mill	Dyerville Mill	June 18, 1979 (#79000055)	610 Manton Ave. 41°49′35″N 71°27′42″W	
54	Eagle Steam Mill-Harrison Steam Mill-Providence Combing Company Plant		June 23, 2026 (#100013165)	50 Agnes Street, 62-68 Dike Street; 41°48′57″N 71°26′34″W	
55	Earnscliffe Woolen-Paragon Worsted Company Mill Complex	Earnscliffe Woolen-Paragon Worsted Company Mill Complex	April 4, 2007 (#07000265)	25 and 39 Manton Ave. 41°49′05″N 71°26′39″W	
56	Elizabeth Building	Elizabeth Building	November 5, 1971 (#71000034)	100 N. Main St. 41°49′41″N 71°24′38″W	One of Providence's few surviving commercial buildings with a cast iron facade
57	Elmgrove Gardens Historic District	Elmgrove Gardens Historic District	February 2, 2005 (#04001589)	Rochambeau, Morris, and Cole Aves. and Fosdyke and Woodbury Sts. 41°50′52″N 71°23′31″W	
58	Elmwood Historic District	Elmwood Historic District	January 7, 1980 (#80004603)	North Section bounded by Broad Street and Elmwood Avenue, along sections of Whitmarsh, Moore, Daboll, and Mawney Sts. and Princeton Ave. South Section along Ontario St. and Congress, Lexington, Atlantic, and Adelaide Aves. 41°48′03″N 71°25′23″W	
59	Ernest Street Sewage Pumping Station	Ernest Street Sewage Pumping Station	January 13, 1989 (#88003103)	Ernest and Ellis Sts. 41°47′42″N 71°23′52″W	
60	Federal Building	Federal Building	April 13, 1972 (#72000040)	Kennedy Plaza; 41°49′33″N 71°24′40″W	
61	First Baptist Meetinghouse	First Baptist Meetinghouse	October 15, 1966 (#66000017)	N. Main St. between Thomas and Waterman Sts. 41°49′38″N 71°24′33″W	Oldest Baptist church congregation in U.S., founded by Roger Williams in 1638; the present Joseph Brown building dates to 1775.
62	First Universalist Church	First Universalist Church	August 16, 1977 (#77000026)	250 Washington St. 41°49′15″N 71°25′04″W	
63	Fleur-de-Lys Studios	Fleur-de-Lys Studios	October 5, 1992 (#92001886)	7 Thomas St. 41°49′40″N 71°24′33″W	
64	Freeman Plat Historic District	Freeman Plat Historic District	June 2, 1995 (#95000664)	Roughly bounded by Morris, Sessions, Cole, and Everett Aves. 41°50′18″N 71°23′38″W	
65	General Ice Cream Corporation Building	General Ice Cream Corporation Building	August 19, 2008 (#08000788)	485 Plainfield St. 41°48′49″N 71°27′16″W	
66	Gloria Dei Evangelical Lutheran Church	Gloria Dei Evangelical Lutheran Church	February 23, 1984 (#84002006)	15 Hayes St. 41°49′46″N 71°25′03″W	
67	Grace Church	Grace Church	June 19, 1972 (#72000042)	175 Mathewson St. 41°49′18″N 71°24′50″W	
68	Joseph Haile House	Joseph Haile House	May 19, 1972 (#72000007)	106 George St. 41°49′32″N 71°24′10″W	A free-standing 1806 townhouse restored extensively in the 1930s to house a collection of furniture and paintings
69	Hay and Owen Buildings	Hay and Owen Buildings	November 12, 1982 (#82001859)	101 and 117–135 Dyer St. 41°49′24″N 71°24′33″W	
70	Heaton and Cowing Mill	Heaton and Cowing Mill	June 6, 2012 (#12000332)	1115 Douglas Ave. 41°51′26″N 71°26′34″W	
71	Hope Block and Cheapside	Hope Block and Cheapside	May 21, 1975 (#75000059)	22–26 and 40 N. Main St. 41°49′35″N 71°24′33″W	
72	Hope-Power-Cooke Streets Historic District	Hope-Power-Cooke Streets Historic District	January 12, 1973 (#73000070)	Roughly bounded by Angell, Governor, Williams, and Brook Sts. 41°49′35″N 71°23′51″W	
73	Esek Hopkins House	Esek Hopkins House	May 22, 1973 (#73000071)	97 Admiral St. 41°50′29″N 71°25′15″W	
74	Gov. Stephen Hopkins House	Gov. Stephen Hopkins House	April 3, 1970 (#70000022)	15 Hopkins St. 41°49′29″N 71°24′25″W	Home of colonial and state governor and signer of the Declaration of Independence
75	Thomas F. Hoppin House	Thomas F. Hoppin House	February 6, 1973 (#73000072)	383 Benefit St. 41°49′17″N 71°24′11″W	Home to the Annenberg Institute for School Reform at Brown University
76	Thomas P. Ives House	Thomas P. Ives House	December 30, 1970 (#70000023)	66 Power St. 41°49′24″N 71°24′10″W	
77	Jones Warehouses	Jones Warehouses	January 7, 1980 (#80000099)	49–63 Central St. 41°48′50″N 71°25′23″W	
78	Ladd Observatory	Ladd Observatory	June 6, 2000 (#93000583)	210 Doyle Ave., at its junction with Hope St. 41°50′21″N 71°23′59″W	A significant work of locally eminent firm Stone, Carpenter & Willson
79	Governor Henry Lippitt House	Governor Henry Lippitt House	November 27, 1972 (#72000043)	199 Hope St. 41°49′41″N 71°23′52″W	Italian villa home by Henry Childs with many original interiors
80	Loew's State Theater	Loew's State Theater	August 19, 1977 (#77000027)	220 Weybosset St. 41°49′15″N 71°24′45″W	Now known as the Providence Performing Arts Center
81	Louttit Laundry	Louttit Laundry	March 18, 2004 (#04000197)	93 Cranston St. 41°49′04″N 71°25′27″W	Demolished 2008
82	Matthew Lynch House	Matthew Lynch House	March 8, 1978 (#78000001)	120 Robinson St. 41°48′29″N 71°25′01″W	
83	Market House	Market House	April 13, 1972 (#72000001)	Market Sq. 41°49′32″N 71°24′31″W	
84	Israel B. Mason House	Israel B. Mason House	August 16, 1977 (#77000001)	571 Broad St. 41°48′31″N 71°25′16″W	
85	Mechanical Fabric Company	Mechanical Fabric Company	January 8, 2014 (#13001059)	55 Cromwell St., 40, 40R, 50, and 50R Sprague St. 41°48′33″N 71°25′35″W	
86	Merchants Bank Building	Merchants Bank Building	November 21, 1977 (#77000002)	32 Westminster St. 41°49′29″N 71°24′36″W	
87	Moshassuck Square	Moshassuck Square	September 8, 1970 (#70000001)	Roughly bounded by Charles, Randall, N. Main, and Smith Sts. 41°50′03″N 71°24′43″W	
88	National and Providence Worsted Mills	National and Providence Worsted Mills	July 11, 2003 (#03000656)	166 Valley St. 41°49′16″N 71°26′27″W	
89	Neutaconkanut Hill Park Historic District		February 2, 2026 (#100012682)	Roughly bounded by Plainfield, Duxbury, and Killingly Sts. 41°48′39″N 71°27′44″W	
90	New England Butt Company	New England Butt Company	January 7, 1980 (#80000001)	304 Pearl St. 41°48′54″N 71°25′22″W	
91	Nicholson File Company Mill Complex	Nicholson File Company Mill Complex	August 22, 2005 (#05000918)	1–45 Acorn St. 41°49′39″N 71°25′47″W	
92	Nightingale-Brown House	Nightingale-Brown House	June 29, 1989 (#89001242)	357 Benefit St. 41°49′16″N 71°24′09″W	One of the most accomplished Georgian homes in the country; later renovations and additions by Richard Upjohn and grounds by Frederick Law Olmsted
93	North Burial Ground	North Burial Ground	September 13, 1977 (#77000003)	Between Branch Ave. and N. Main St. 41°50′55″N 71°24′24″W	
94	Norwood Avenue Historic District	Norwood Avenue Historic District	April 26, 2002 (#02000412)	Roughly along Norwood Ave. between Roger Williams Park and Broad St. 41°46′51″N 71°24′12″W	Extends into Cranston
95	Oakland Avenue Historic District	Oakland Avenue Historic District	November 1, 1984 (#84000378)	Roughly bounded by Pembroke Ave. and Eaton, Malbone, and Dickens Sts. 41°50′20″N 71°25′48″W	
96	Olney Street-Alumni Avenue Historic District	Olney Street-Alumni Avenue Historic District	May 11, 1989 (#89000333)	Roughly bounded by Olney St., Arlington Ave., Alumni Ave., and Hope St. 41°50′09″N 71°23′53″W	
97	Ontario Apartments	Ontario Apartments	March 5, 1998 (#98000214)	25–31 and 37–41 Ontario St. 41°48′00″N 71°25′11″W	
98	Oriental Mills	Oriental Mills	December 23, 2005 (#05001463)	10 Admiral St. 41°50′23″N 71°25′10″W	
99	Our Lady of Lourdes Church Complex	Our Lady of Lourdes Church Complex	March 15, 1990 (#90000343)	901–903 Atwells Ave. 41°49′32″N 71°26′52″W	
100	Parkis-Comstock Historic District	Parkis-Comstock Historic District	January 7, 1980 (#80000005)	Broad St. and Parkis and Comstock Aves.; also 568 and 570-572 Broad St. and 39-41, 54-56, and 60-62 Harvard Ave. 41°48′33″N 71°25′15″W	Specific addresses represent a boundary increase of May 5, 1988
101	Nathaniel Pearce House	Nathaniel Pearce House	May 19, 1972 (#72000002)	305 Brook St. 41°49′31″N 71°23′56″W	
102	Pekin Street Historic District	Pekin Street Historic District	November 1, 1984 (#84000381)	Roughly bounded by Pekin and Candace Sts., Douglas and Chalkstone Aves. 41°50′12″N 71°25′29″W	
103	Perkins Buildings	Perkins Buildings	January 30, 2004 (#03001521)	85 Sprague St., 101 and 102 Westfield St. 41°48′37″N 71°25′40″W	
104	Pine Street Historic District	Pine Street Historic District	September 13, 1978 (#78000005)	Irregular pattern along Pine St. from Myrtle to Seekill Sts. 41°48′50″N 71°25′06″W	
105	Plain Farm House	Plain Farm House	June 27, 1980 (#80000006)	108 Webster Ave. 41°48′48″N 71°27′01″W	
106	Plymouth Congregational Church	Plymouth Congregational Church	March 12, 2021 (#100006299)	1014 Broad St. 41°47′50″N 71°24′48″W	
107	Poirier's Diner	Poirier's Diner	July 17, 2003 (#03000657)	1380 Westminster St. 41°49′07″N 71°26′01″W	Originally located at 1467 Westminster St.; moved to 1380 Westminster Street in 2011. Operating as "West Side Diner."
108	Power Street-Cooke Street Historic District		July 30, 1974 (#74002345)	Roughly bounded by Angell, Governor, Power, and Hope Sts. 41°49′33″N 71°23′47″W	
109	Providence City Hall	Providence City Hall	January 23, 1975 (#75000001)	Dorrance and Washington Sts. 41°49′26″N 71°24′48″W	
110	Providence Dyeing, Bleaching, Calendring Company	Providence Dyeing, Bleaching, Calendring Company	October 18, 2004 (#04000809)	46, 50, 52, and 60 Valley St. and 80 Delaine St. 41°49′07″N 71°26′31″W	
111	Providence Fruit and Produce Warehouse Company Building	Providence Fruit and Produce Warehouse Company Building	June 10, 2005 (#05000583)	6–64 Harris Ave. 41°49′40″N 71°25′49″W	Demolished in January 2008.
112	Providence Gas Company Purifier House	Providence Gas Company Purifier House	June 21, 2007 (#07000589)	200 Allens Ave. 41°48′29″N 71°24′11″W	
113	Providence Jewelry Manufacturing Historic District	Providence Jewelry Manufacturing Historic District	December 5, 1985 (#85003088)	Bounded by Ship St., Ashcroft and Elbow and Hospital Sts., Point and South Sts., Imperial and Claverick Sts., and U.S. Route 195; also bounded by U.S. Route 195 and Point, Parsonage, South, Hospital, Elbow, Ashcroft, Richmond, Eddy, and Ship Sts. 41°49′02″N 71°24′39″W	Second set of boundaries represents a boundary increase of March 20, 2012
114	Providence Lying-In Hospital	Providence Lying-In Hospital	August 13, 1986 (#86001512)	50 Maude St. 41°50′08″N 71°25′47″W	
115	Providence Steel and Iron Company Complex	Providence Steel and Iron Company Complex	August 24, 2005 (#05000919)	27 Sims Ave. 41°49′34″N 71°26′05″W	
116	Providence Telephone Company	Providence Telephone Company	August 4, 1983 (#83000002)	112 Union St. 41°49′19″N 71°24′53″W	
117	Providence-Biltmore Hotel	Providence-Biltmore Hotel	May 27, 1977 (#77000005)	11 Dorrance St. 41°49′27″N 71°24′49″W	
118	Reservoir Avenue Sewage Pumping Station	Reservoir Avenue Sewage Pumping Station	January 13, 1989 (#88003108)	Reservoir and Pontiac Aves. 41°47′15″N 71°25′56″W	
119	Return Sludge Pumping Station, Fields Point Sewage Treatment Plant	Return Sludge Pumping Station, Fields Point Sewage Treatment Plant	January 13, 1989 (#88003105)	Ernest St. 41°47′40″N 71°23′18″W	
120	Rhode Island Hospital Trust Building	Rhode Island Hospital Trust Building	October 22, 1976 (#76000002)	15 Westminster St. 41°49′31″N 71°24′37″W	
121	Rhode Island Medical Society Building	Rhode Island Medical Society Building	June 4, 1984 (#84002043)	106 Francis St. 41°49′46″N 71°25′00″W	
122	Rhode Island Statehouse	Rhode Island Statehouse	April 28, 1970 (#70000002)	90 Smith St. 41°49′48″N 71°24′55″W	
123	Rhode Island Tool Company	Rhode Island Tool Company	August 4, 2004 (#04000808)	146–148 W. River St. 41°50′36″N 71°24′56″W	
124	Rhodes Street Historic District	Rhodes Street Historic District	November 12, 1982 (#82000004)	Rhodes, Janes, and Alphonso Sts. 41°48′28″N 71°24′32″W	
125	Rochambeau Branch-Providence Public Library	Rochambeau Branch-Providence Public Library	March 5, 1998 (#98000215)	708 Hope St. 41°50′46″N 71°23′50″W	
126	Rochambeau Worsted Company Mill	Rochambeau Worsted Company Mill	July 24, 2017 (#100001366)	60 King St. 41°49′23″N 71°27′13″W	
127	Roger Williams National Memorial	Roger Williams National Memorial	October 15, 1966 (#66000942)	Bounded by N. Main, Canal, Smith, and Haymarket Sts. 41°49′48″N 71°24′38″W	
128	Roger Williams Park Historic District	Roger Williams Park Historic District	October 15, 1966 (#66000002)	Roger Williams Park; 41°46′55″N 71°24′43″W	
129	Joseph and William Russell House	Joseph and William Russell House	August 12, 1971 (#71000001)	118 N. Main St. 41°49′41″N 71°24′34″W	
130	St. Joseph's Roman Catholic Church	St. Joseph's Roman Catholic Church	July 15, 1974 (#74000004)	86 Hope St. 41°49′17″N 71°23′50″W	
131	Saint Martin's Church	Saint Martin's Church	May 16, 1996 (#96000571)	50 Orchard Ave. 41°49′55″N 71°23′10″W	
132	St. Michael's Roman Catholic Church, Convent, Rectory, and School	St. Michael's Roman Catholic Church, Convent, Rectory, and School	March 25, 1977 (#77000006)	251 Oxford St. 41°48′06″N 71°24′52″W	
133	St. Stephen's Church	St. Stephen's Church	February 6, 1973 (#73000001)	114 George St. 41°49′32″N 71°24′04″W	
134	Shakespeare Hall	Shakespeare Hall	June 18, 1979 (#79000002)	128 Dorrance St. 41°49′20″N 71°24′36″W	
135	Shepard Company Building	Shepard Company Building	August 11, 1976 (#76000003)	259 Westminster Mall, 72–92 Washington St. 41°49′22″N 71°24′51″W	
136	Sixth District Courthouse	Sixth District Courthouse	April 28, 1970 (#70000092)	150 Benefit St. 41°49′44″N 71°24′34″W	Also known as Old State House
137	Sludge Press House, Fields Point Sewage Treatment Plant	Sludge Press House, Fields Point Sewage Treatment Plant	January 13, 1989 (#88003104)	Ernest St. at Fields Point; 41°47′40″N 71°23′24″W	
138	Smith Hill Branch-Providence Public Library	Smith Hill Branch-Providence Public Library	March 5, 1998 (#98000216)	31 Candace St. 41°50′07″N 71°25′21″W	
139	Smith Hill Historic District	Smith Hill Historic District	November 4, 1993 (#93001183)	57–65 Brownell St., 73–114 Holden St., 23–80 Jewett St., 189–240 Smith St., and 10–18 W. Park St. 41°49′55″N 71°25′08″W	
140	Smith Street Primary School	Smith Street Primary School	February 23, 1984 (#84002050)	396 Smith St. 41°50′02″N 71°25′30″W	
141	Sons of Jacob Synagogue	Sons of Jacob Synagogue	August 24, 1989 (#89001152)	24 Douglas Ave. 41°50′06″N 71°25′02″W	
142	South Providence Branch-Providence Public Library	South Providence Branch-Providence Public Library	March 5, 1998 (#98000218)	455 Prairie Ave. 41°48′07″N 71°24′51″W	
143	South Street Station	South Street Station	June 30, 2006 (#06000553)	360 Eddy St. 41°49′07″N 71°24′24″W	
144	David Sprague House	David Sprague House	May 23, 1978 (#78000010)	7 Harvard Ave. at Taylor St. 41°48′32″N 71°25′06″W	This house was moved from its original location at 263 Public St.
145	State Arsenal	State Arsenal	April 28, 1970 (#70000003)	176 Benefit St. 41°49′42″N 71°24′32″W	
146	State Home and School for Dependent and Neglected Children	State Home and School for Dependent and Neglected Children	December 30, 2019 (#100004820)	Rhode Island College, East Campus, 600 Mount Pleasant Ave. 41°50′38″N 71°27′24″W	
147	Stedman & Fuller Manufacturing Company Complex	Stedman & Fuller Manufacturing Company Complex	June 14, 2021 (#100006644)	49 Westfield St. 41°48′37″N 71°25′36″W	
148	Stimson Avenue Historic District	Stimson Avenue Historic District	April 24, 1973 (#73000003)	Both sides of Stimson Ave. and Diman Pl. between Angell St. on the south, Hope St. on the west, and a stone wall on the north 41°49′42″N 71°23′44″W	
149	Summit Historic District	Summit Historic District	September 23, 2003 (#03000495)	Summit Ave., Rochambeau Ave., Camp St., Memorial Rd., and Creston Way; 41°50′52″N 71°23′57″W	
150	Swan Point Cemetery	Swan Point Cemetery	October 5, 1977 (#77000007)	585 Blackstone Boulevard; also opposite 585 Blackstone; 41°51′09″N 71°23′00″W	Second address represents a boundary increase of November 28, 1978
151	Temple Beth-El	Temple Beth-El	December 29, 1988 (#88003074)	688 Broad St. 41°48′19″N 71°25′11″W	
152	Trinity Square Historic District	Trinity Square Historic District	January 7, 1980 (#80000011)	Broad St. and Elmwood Ave. 41°48′44″N 71°25′24″W	
153	Trinity Square Repertory Theatre	Trinity Square Repertory Theatre	June 5, 1972 (#72000004)	201 Washington St. 41°49′19″N 71°25′01″W	
154	U.S. Customshouse	U.S. Customshouse	April 13, 1972 (#72000005)	24 Weybosset St. 41°49′28″N 71°24′36″W	
155	Union Station	Union Station	February 20, 1975 (#75000003)	Exchange Ter. 41°49′32″N 71°24′50″W	
156	Union Trust Company Building	Union Trust Company Building	March 1, 1973 (#73000004)	62 Dorrance St. 41°49′24″N 71°24′42″W	
157	United States Post Office Annex	United States Post Office Annex	December 7, 2017 (#100001887)	2 Exchange Terrace; 41°49′35″N 71°24′40″W	Now known as the John O. Pastore Federal Building.
158	United States Rubber Company Mill Complex	United States Rubber Company Mill Complex	August 24, 2005 (#05000917)	Bounded by Hemlock and Valley Sts., Richmond Pl., and the Woonasquatucket River; 41°49′40″N 71°26′02″W	
159	University Hall, Brown University	University Hall, Brown University	October 15, 1966 (#66000003)	Brown University campus 41°49′34″N 71°24′16″W	Oldest building on Brown campus; built 1770
160	Veterans Memorial Auditorium – Masonic Temple	Veterans Memorial Auditorium – Masonic Temple	November 16, 1993 (#93001181)	Junction of Brownell and Park Sts. 41°49′48″N 71°25′00″W	
161	Wanskuck Branch-Providence Public Library	Wanskuck Branch-Providence Public Library	March 5, 1998 (#98000217)	233 Veazie St. 41°51′04″N 71°26′05″W	
162	Wanskuck Historic District	Wanskuck Historic District	December 1, 1983 (#83003867)	Roughly bounded by Branch Ave., Louisquisset Pike, and town boundary 41°51′20″N 71°25′56″W	
163	Washington Park Sewage Pumping Station	Washington Park Sewage Pumping Station	January 13, 1989 (#88003107)	Shipyard St. 41°47′29″N 71°23′24″W	
164	Wayland Historic District	Wayland Historic District	December 8, 2005 (#05001399)	Roughly bounded by Arlington and Laurel Aves., Weymouth St., Blackstone Boulevard, Butler Ave., and Angell and S. Angell Sts. 41°50′01″N 71°23′20″W	
165	Weybosset Mills Complex	Weybosset Mills Complex	January 10, 2008 (#07001381)	Dike, Oak, Magnolia, Agnes, and Troy Sts. 41°48′52″N 71°26′31″W	
166	Wesleyan Avenue Historic District	Wesleyan Avenue Historic District	November 23, 1982 (#82000011)	Roughly Wesleyan Ave., between Taylor and Broad Sts. 41°48′28″N 71°25′11″W	
167	Westminster Street Historic District	Westminster Street Historic District	May 30, 2003 (#03000494)	Roughly along Westminster St., between Stewart St. and Sawins Ln. 41°49′06″N 71°25′13″W	
168	Josephine White Block	Josephine White Block	January 7, 1980 (#80000014)	737–739 Cranston St. 41°48′17″N 71°26′19″W	
169	Winsor-Swan-Whitman Farm	Winsor-Swan-Whitman Farm	May 1, 1974 (#74000006)	416 Eaton St. 41°50′36″N 71°26′33″W	
170	Constance Witherby Park	Constance Witherby Park	November 25, 1975 (#75000005)	210 Pitman St. 41°49′37″N 71°23′03″W	
171	Woods-Gerry House	Woods-Gerry House	February 12, 1971 (#71000003)	62 Prospect St. 41°49′42″N 71°24′21″W	

== Former and moved listings ==
	Name on the Register	Image	Date listed	Date removed	Location	Description
1	Columbus	Columbus	October 19, 2001 (#01000468)	Still listed	Johnston Memorial Park, Johnston, Rhode Island; 41°47′48″N 71°25′33″W	Removed from Providence in June 2020 and relocated to Johnston Memorial Park in October 2023.
2	North Freight Station	North Freight Station	May 7, 1973 (#73002265)	December 18, 1980	Canal St. 41°49′46″N 71°24′42″W	Demolished in 1973.

== See also ==
- List of National Historic Landmarks in Rhode Island
- National Register of Historic Places listings in Rhode Island
