= Pine Street Historic District (Providence, Rhode Island) =

Historic district in Rhode Island, United States

- U.S. National Register of Historic Places
- U.S. Historic district
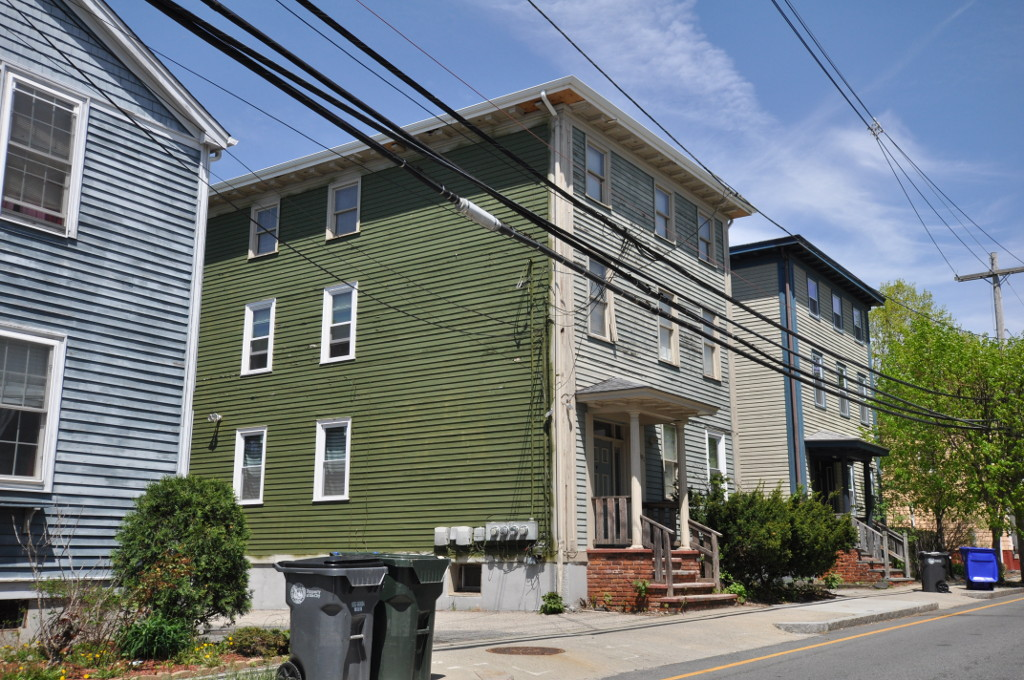

- Location within Rhode Island Location within the United States
- Location: Providence, Rhode Island
- Coordinates: 41°48′50″N 71°25′6″W
- Area: 28 acres (11 ha)
- Architect: Dyer, William H.
- Architectural style: Greek Revival, Late Victorian
- NRHP reference No.: 78000005
- Added to NRHP: September 13, 1978

The Pine Street Historic District is a residential historic district on the south side of Providence, Rhode Island. It extends along Pine Street between Seekell and Myrtle Streets, and includes properties east of Pine and north of Pearl Street on Friendship, Prince, Maple, and Stewart Streets. The district represents an enclave of 19th-century residential housing in an area otherwise affected by urban renewal activities.

The district was listed on the National Register of Historic Places in 1978.

== See also ==
- National Register of Historic Places listings in Providence, Rhode Island
