= Rhode Island Tool Company building =

- Rhode Island Tool Company
- U.S. National Register of Historic Places
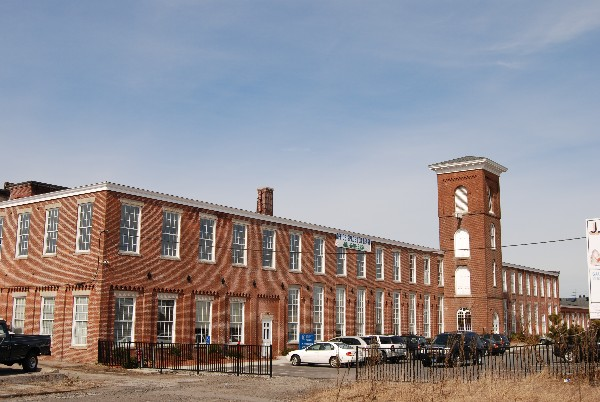

- Location within Rhode Island Location within the United States
- Location: Providence, Rhode Island
- Coordinates: 41°50′36″N 71°24′56″W
- Area: 5 acres (2.0 ha)
- Built: 1853
- NRHP reference No.: 04000808
- Added to NRHP: August 4, 2004

The Rhode Island Tool Company is a historic industrial property at 146-148 West River Street in Providence, Rhode Island. It is a 5-acre (2.0 ha) parcel located between West River Street and the channelized West River, on which stand two historic buildings. The main building of the complex is a sprawling agglomeration of attached structures, whose construction began in 1853, and whose surviving elements include six parts that predate the American Civil War. Construction of the complex was begun by the Providence Forge & Nut Company, which purchased the Providence Tool Company, and was the largest employer in Providence in the 1870s. The complex represents the best-preserved period metal-processing facility in Providence, and was the only drop-forging operation the state when it closed in 2003.

The building has been repurposed as an office and technical space. It is now called the West River Center.

The property was listed on the National Register of Historic Places in 2004.

== See also ==
- National Register of Historic Places listings in Providence, Rhode Island
