= Heaton and Cowing Mill =

- U.S. National Register of Historic Places
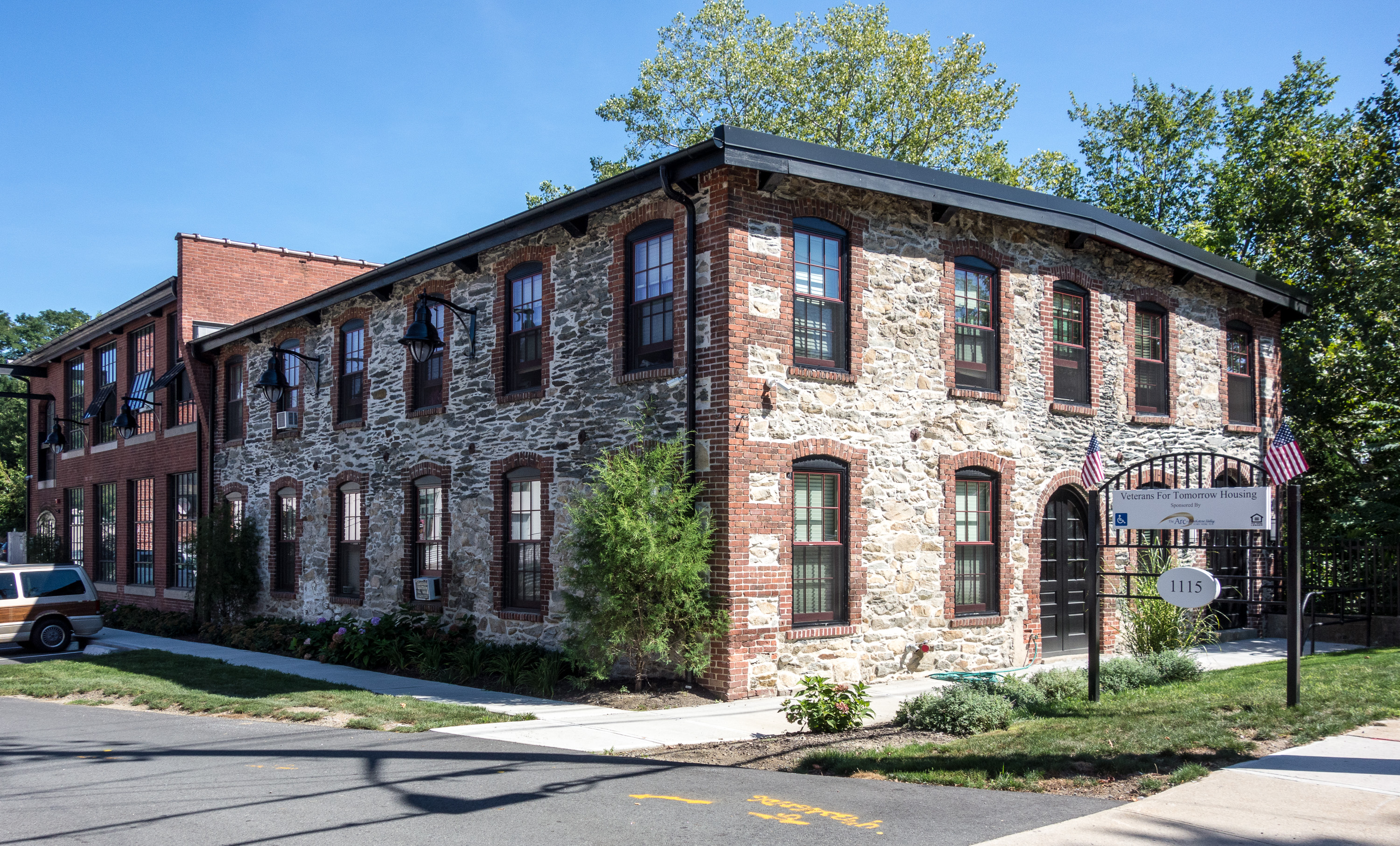

- Location within Rhode Island Location within the United States
- Location: 1115 Douglas Ave., Providence, Rhode Island
- Coordinates: 41°51′26″N 71°26′34″W
- Area: 0.58 acres (0.23 ha)
- Built: 1832
- Architectural style: Italianate
- NRHP reference No.: 12000332
- Added to NRHP: June 6, 2012

The Heaton and Cowing Mill is a historic industrial facility at 1115 Douglas Avenue in Providence, Rhode Island. The small mill complex consists of three connected building sections; the oldest is a c. 1832 rubble-walled two story mill building constructed by David Heaton and Martin Cowing on the banks of the West River. The partners used the facility to manufacture and dye cotton cloth. The building is the remnant of a much larger Geneva Worsted Company works that Heaton and Cowing built on the site in the 1860s and 1870s.

== History ==
The mill was built in 1832 by David Heaton (1802-1864) and Martin K. Cowing (1807-1891) on the West River for small-scale textile manufacturing. The site grew over the years to include a repair shop, dye house, and finishing rooms. By 1891 the 1832 building was used for storage and a carpenter's shop. In 1896, the entire operation was sold to the Wanskuck Company. They added a large brick, two-story addition to the old mill between 1926 and 1937. The plant was closed down in 1957 due to southern competition and labor conflict.

In the second half of the 20th century, the building served a variety of light industrial businesses, and in 1982 a concrete block building was added to its rear. Most of its original waterworks infrastructure has either been filled in, or was destroyed by flooding in 2010. Eventually the property became vacant and blighted, as industrial pollutants contaminated the site.

The building was listed on the National Register of Historic Places in 2012. At this time the building was undergoing renovation and conversion for use as apartments.

In 2015 the complex opened as "Veterans for Tomorrow", a 20-apartment housing complex managed by the Providence Housing Authority for veterans who are homeless or at risk of homelessness.

== See also ==
- National Register of Historic Places listings in Providence, Rhode Island
