= Ontario Apartments =

- U.S. National Register of Historic Places
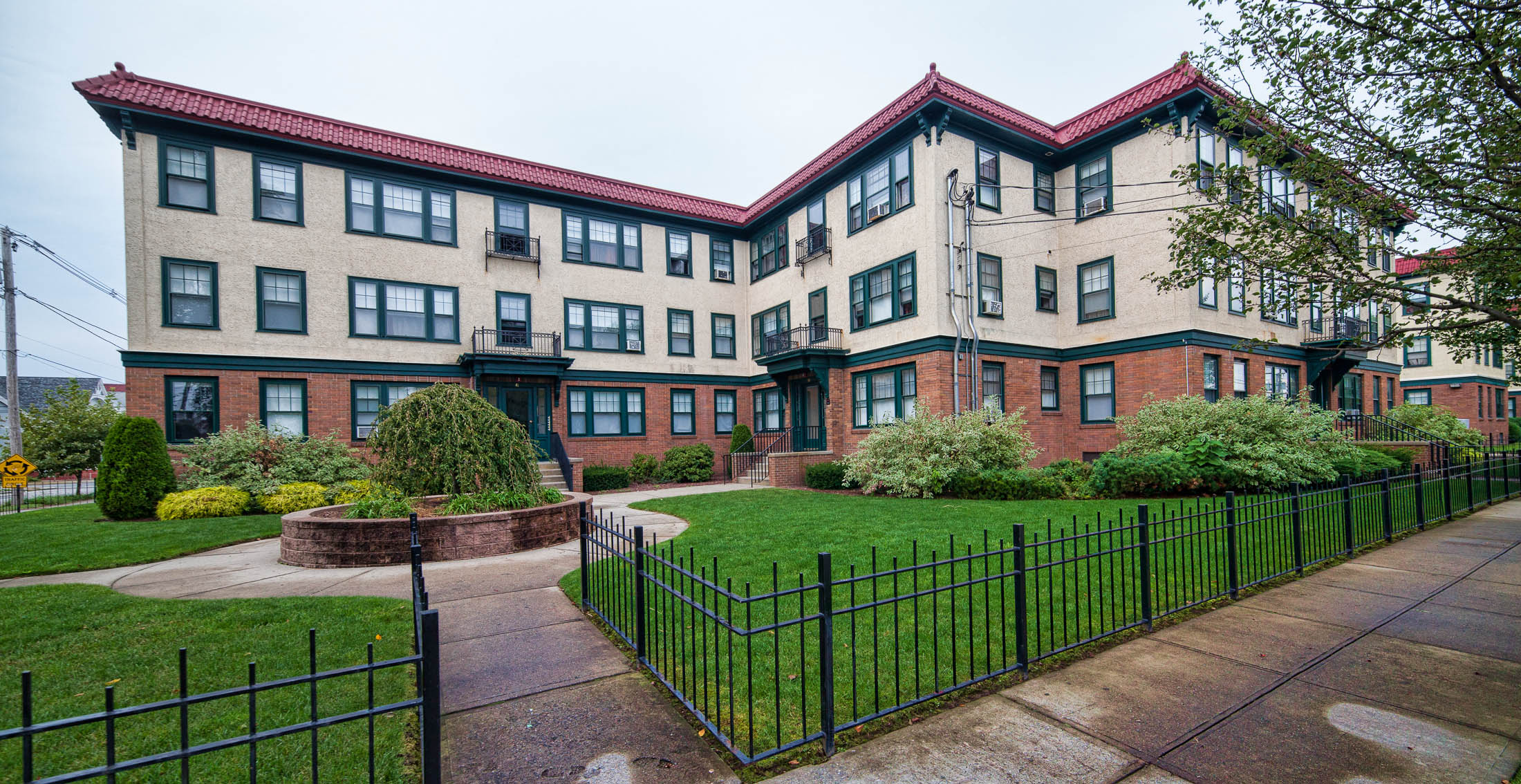

- Location within Rhode Island Location within the United States
- Location: Providence, Rhode Island
- Coordinates: 41°48′0″N 71°25′11″W
- Built: 1925, 1927
- Architect: Page & Page; Soren, Harry
- Architectural style: Mission/Spanish Revival
- NRHP reference No.: 98000214
- Added to NRHP: March 5, 1998

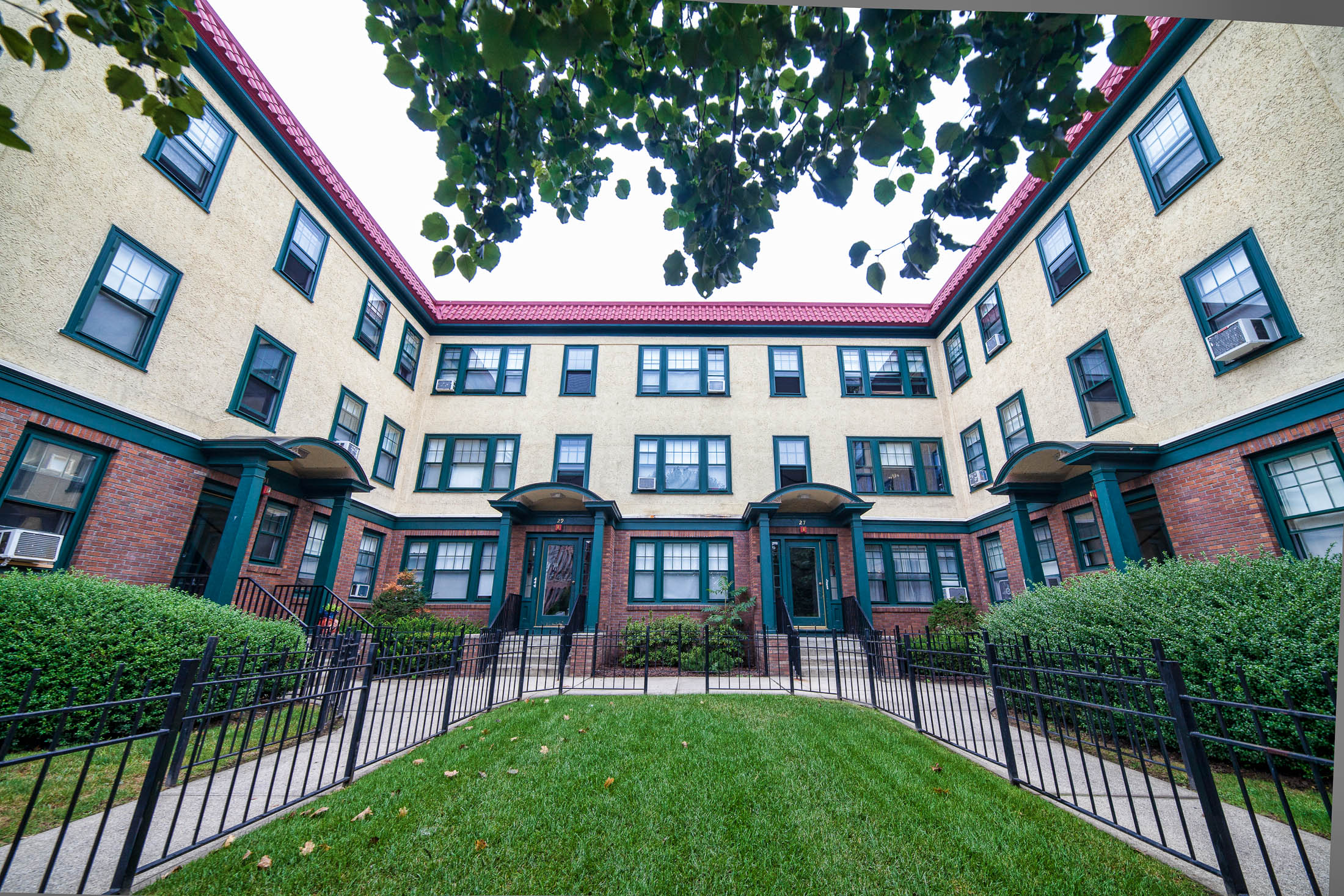

The Ontario Apartments are an historic apartment complex located at 25-31 and 37-41 Ontario Street in Providence, Rhode Island. The apartments were designed by Page & Page, and built in 1925 and 1927 by Harry Soren in a Mission/Spanish Revival style. The apartments consist of two three-story, flat-roofed, wood-framed buildings. The building at 25-31 Ontario Street was built in 1925, and forms a U-shape. 37-41 Ontario Street is to the west, is identical in detail but configured differently.

These buildings are "well-preserved examples of early twentieth-century apartment buildings and are typical of ... apartment buildings in middle-class neighborhoods during the 1910s and 1920s." They were designed to appeal to wealthier tenants who did not want to care for single-family dwellings. They were added to the National Register of Historic Places in 1998.

== See also ==
- National Register of Historic Places listings in Providence, Rhode Island
