= United States Rubber Company Mill Complex =

- U.S. National Register of Historic Places
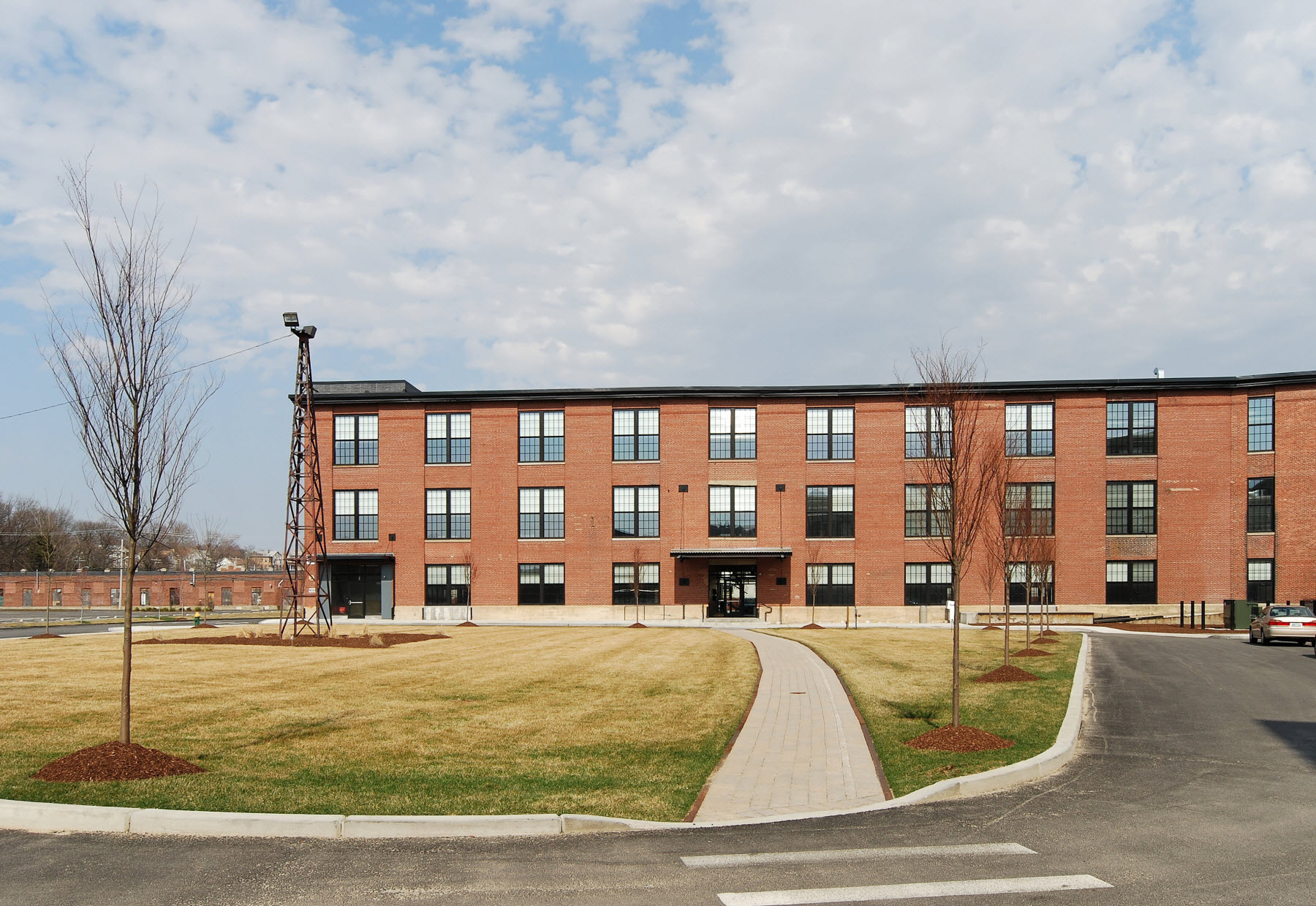

- Location within Rhode Island Location within the United States
- Location: Providence, Rhode Island
- Coordinates: 41.82777°N 71.435°W
- Area: 23 acres (9.3 ha)
- Built: 1885
- Architect: Gilbane, William & Bros.; Cruise & Smiley
- NRHP reference No.: 05000917
- Added to NRHP: August 24, 2005

The United States Rubber Company Mill Complex is a historic industrial facility in Providence, Rhode Island. It is a large complex of factory buildings covering about 23 acres (9.3 ha) on the north bank of the Woonasquatucket River. It is bounded on the west by Ericson Place, the north by Valley Street, and the east by Hemlock Street. The property includes 29 historic buildings, built between c. 1885 and c. 1960, as well as three bridges. The buildings are predominantly brick structures, ranging in height from one to five stories, and were built either by the Joseph Banigan Rubber Company, its successor the United States Rubber Company, or the American Locomotive Company, whose property east of the rubber works was acquired by the US Rubber Company in 1918. Only four buildings built by these companies are known to have been demolished before 1960. The plant closed in 1975, and has since been adapted to a variety of other uses.

The complex was listed on the National Register of Historic Places in 2005.

== See also ==
- National Register of Historic Places listings in Providence, Rhode Island
