= Susan S. and Edward J. Cutler House =

Historic house in Rhode Island, United States

- U.S. National Register of Historic Places
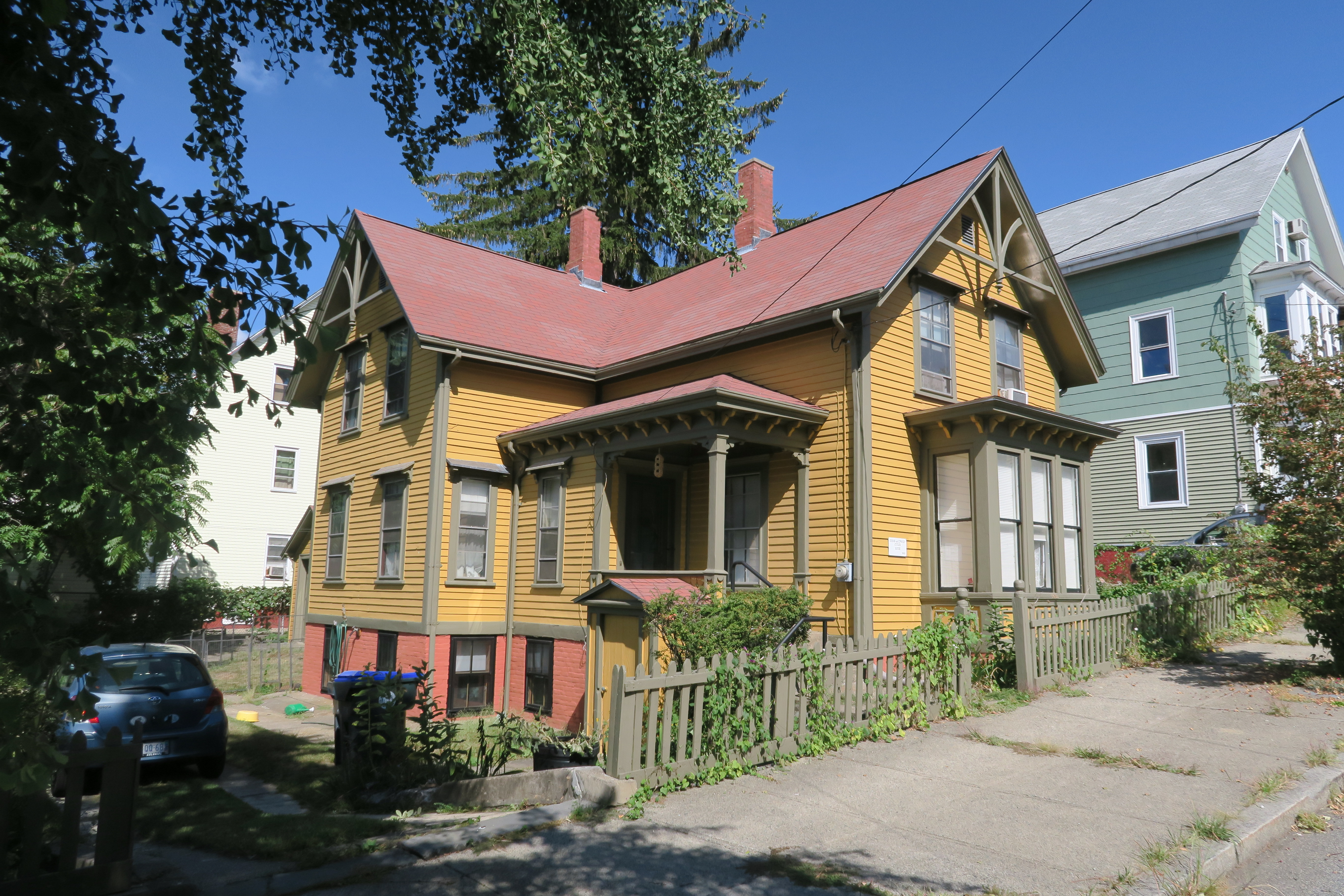

- Location within Rhode Island Location within the United States
- Location: 12 Woodbine St., Providence, Rhode Island
- Coordinates: 41°50′45″N 71°24′18″W
- Area: Less than one acre
- Built: 1880
- Architectural style: Stick style
- NRHP reference No.: 15000138
- Added to NRHP: April 6, 2015

The Susan S. and Edward J. Cutler House is a historic house in Providence, Rhode Island. It is an L-shaped 1 1/2-story wood-frame structure, with a gabled roof and a single-story porch and vestibule in the crook of the L. The front facade has a rectangular projecting bay, with panels below the windows, and a bracketed hip roof. The front and side gables both feature Stick style decorative woodwork. The entry porch roof is bracketed, matching the front bay, and has a jigsawn balustrade. The interior features late Victorian woodwork, plasterwork and original hardware. The house was built in 1880, probably from plans in a published pattern book, and was the first to be built in a relatively new subdivision on Providence's north side. It is a well-preserved example of a "picturesque cottage", a style popularized by a number of 19th-century architects.

The house was listed on the National Register of Historic Places in 2015.

== See also ==
- National Register of Historic Places listings in Providence, Rhode Island
