= Pekin Street Historic District =

Historic district in Rhode Island, United States

- U.S. National Register of Historic Places
- U.S. Historic district
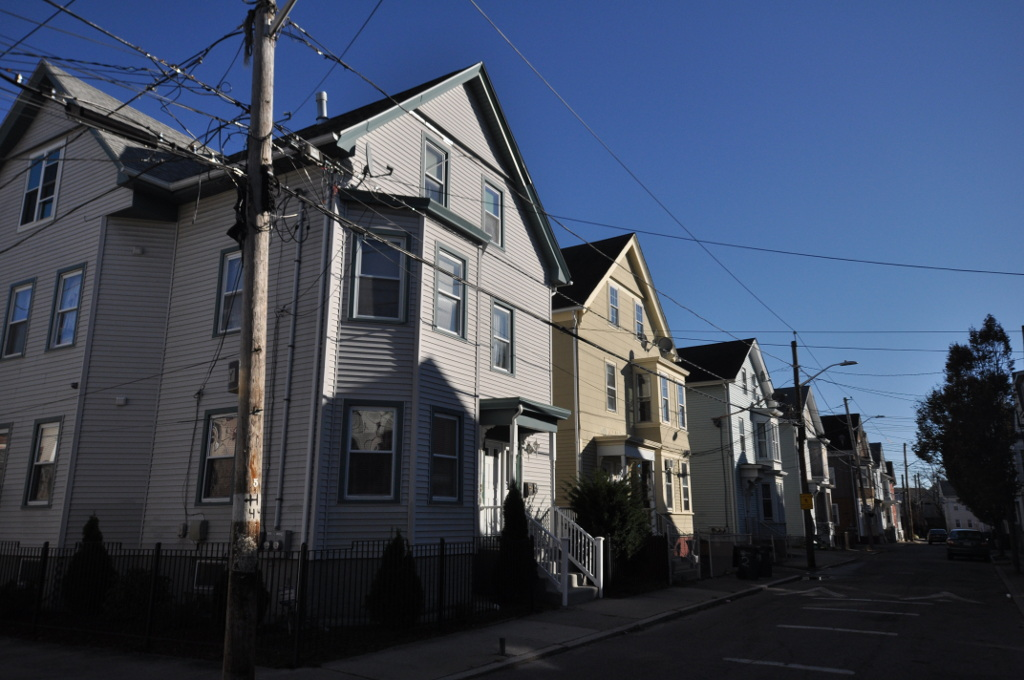

- Location within Rhode Island Location within the United States
- Location: Providence, Rhode Island
- Coordinates: 41°50′12″N 71°25′26″W
- Area: 10.5 acres (4.2 ha)
- Built: 1880
- Architect: Multiple
- Architectural style: Greek Revival, Late Victorian
- NRHP reference No.: 84000381
- Added to NRHP: November 1, 1984

The Pekin Street Historic District is a residential historic district bounded by Pekin and Candace Streets, Douglas and Chalkstone Avenues in Providence, Rhode Island. It is a well-preserved densely built neighborhood of working class housing, built almost entirely between 1870 and 1910. Most of the structures are either two or three-family units, with two-families predominating among the older buildings and triple-deckers among the later ones. The buildings are generally set on narrow lots with small yards. The district's main north-south roads are Pekin and Candace Streets, which are joined by a number of cross streets.

The district was listed on the National Register of Historic Places in 1984.

== See also ==
- National Register of Historic Places listings in Providence, Rhode Island
