= New England Butt Company =

- U.S. National Register of Historic Places
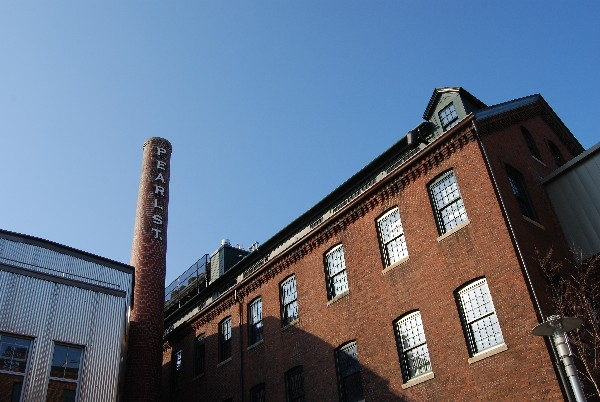

- Location within Rhode Island Location within the United States
- Location: Providence, Rhode Island
- Coordinates: 41°48′54″N 71°25′22″W
- Built: 1865
- Architect: Spencer P. Read
- MPS: Elmwood MRA
- NRHP reference No.: 80000001
- Added to NRHP: January 7, 1980

The New England Butt Company is a historic factory building at 304 Pearl Street in Providence, Rhode Island. It is a 3 1/2-story brick structure with a monitor roof, built in 1865 to designs by Spencer P. Read. The New England Butt Company originally manufactured cast iron butt hinges, but later changed to producing machinery for braiding and stranding wire. Many of the machines are still used today by wire companies throughout the world.

The New England Butt Company factory building was added to the National Register of Historic Places in 1980. The drawings for all of the stranding machinery were sold to Watson Machinery International in Paterson, New Jersey in the mid 1980s. The drawings for all of the braiding machines were sold to Wardwell Braiding Company in Central Falls, Rhode Island, at the same time.

Watson went out of business in 2001 and the drawings were purchased by Kinrei of America, LLC. Today, information about the older stranding machines is available through Kinrei of America, LLC, in Wayne, New Jersey.

== See also ==
- National Register of Historic Places listings in Providence, Rhode Island
