= Aylesworth Apartments =

- U.S. National Register of Historic Places
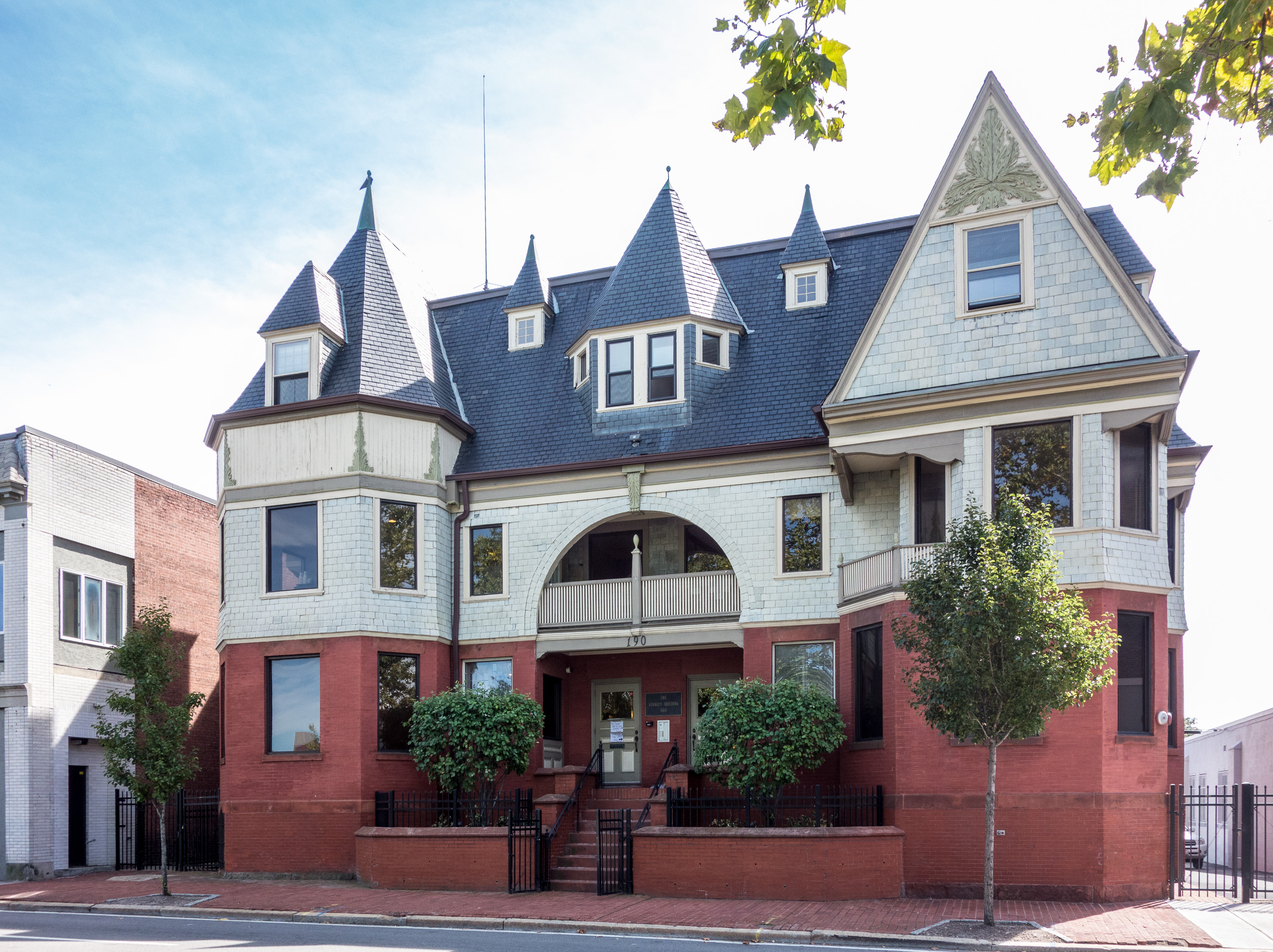

- Location within Rhode Island Location within the United States
- Location: 188–194 Broad Street, Providence, Rhode Island
- Coordinates: 41°49′00″N 71°25′06″W
- Built: 1888
- Architectural style: Queen Anne
- NRHP reference No.: 82000133
- Added to NRHP: November 12, 1982

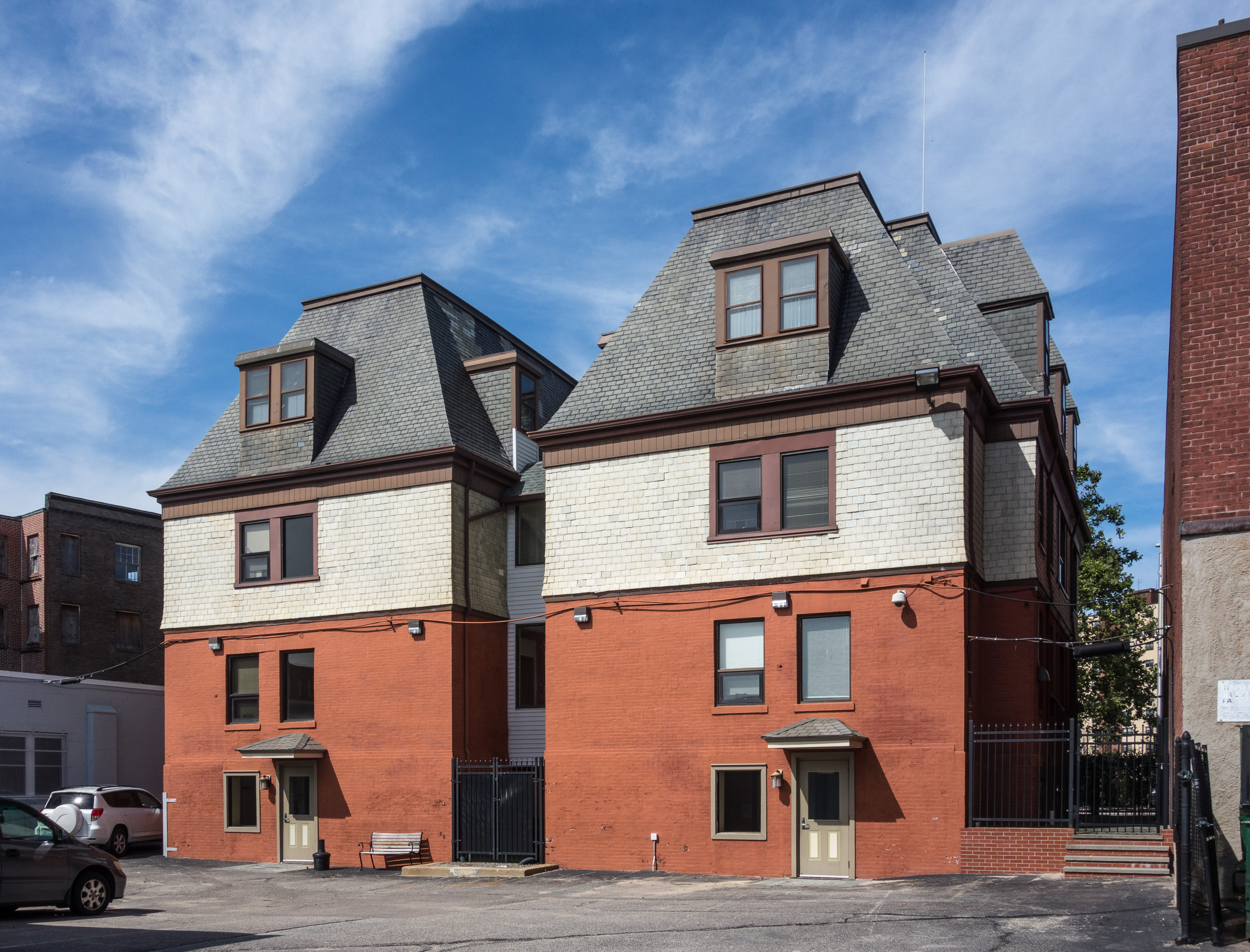
Rear of building

The Aylesworth Apartments is a 19th-century apartment building in the Upper South Providence neighborhood of Providence, Rhode Island. Since 1982, the building has been listed on the National Register of Historic Places.

== Description ==
It is a 2 1/2-story structure, built in brick on the first floor, and with its upper floors finished in slate. It has a busy roofline, typical of the Queen Anne style popular when it was built in 1888–89. Its main entry is recessed under a large round archway which also has a small second-story porch under it. The building originally housed four apartments, but was altered in 1978 to house professional offices. It is the oldest known building built as an apartment house in the city.

The building was listed on the National Register of Historic Places in 1982.

== Original owner ==
Eli Aylesworth (1802–1894) built the apartments as an investment. Aylesworth, since 1858, had been president of the Westminster Bank and lived a block east on Broad Street, in a single-family dwelling long since demolished. His firsts tenants here were his peers, at least economically.

== See also ==
- National Register of Historic Places listings in Providence, Rhode Island
