= Doyle Avenue Historic District =

Historic district in Rhode Island, United States

- U.S. National Register of Historic Places
- U.S. Historic district
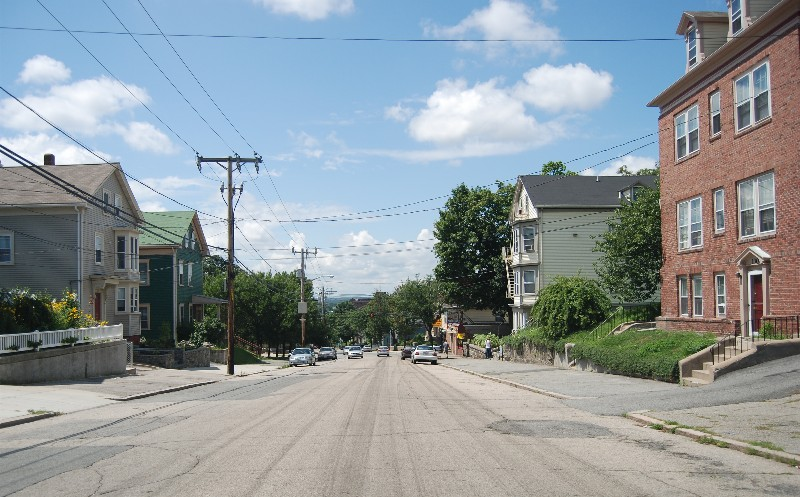
- Doyle Avenue

- Location within Rhode Island Location within the United States
- Location: Providence, Rhode Island
- Coordinates: 41°50′19″N 71°24′26″W
- Architect: Multiple
- Architectural style: Late 19th And 20th Century Revivals, Late Victorian
- NRHP reference No.: 90000104
- Added to NRHP: February 22, 1990

The Doyle Avenue Historic District is a predominantly residential historic district on the East Side of Providence, Rhode Island. It extends along Doyle Avenue from North Main Street in the west to Proctor Place (just short of Hope Avenue). This area was developed residentially between 1860 and 1920, with an architecturally diverse collection of houses (single and multi-unit dwellings), generally set on small lots with only modest setback from the sidewalk. Land on the south side of Doyle Avenue was owned by the Dexter Commission, which managed a large tract of land bequested to the city by Ebenezer Dexter. This land was originally leased to developers. One of the first houses built in this area was the c. 1875 Thomas Collins House at 33 Doyle Avenue, a 2-1/2 story Italianate duplex.

The district was listed on the National Register of Historic Places in 1990.

== See also ==
- National Register of Historic Places listings in Providence, Rhode Island
