= Providence Dyeing, Bleaching, Calendring Company =

- U.S. National Register of Historic Places
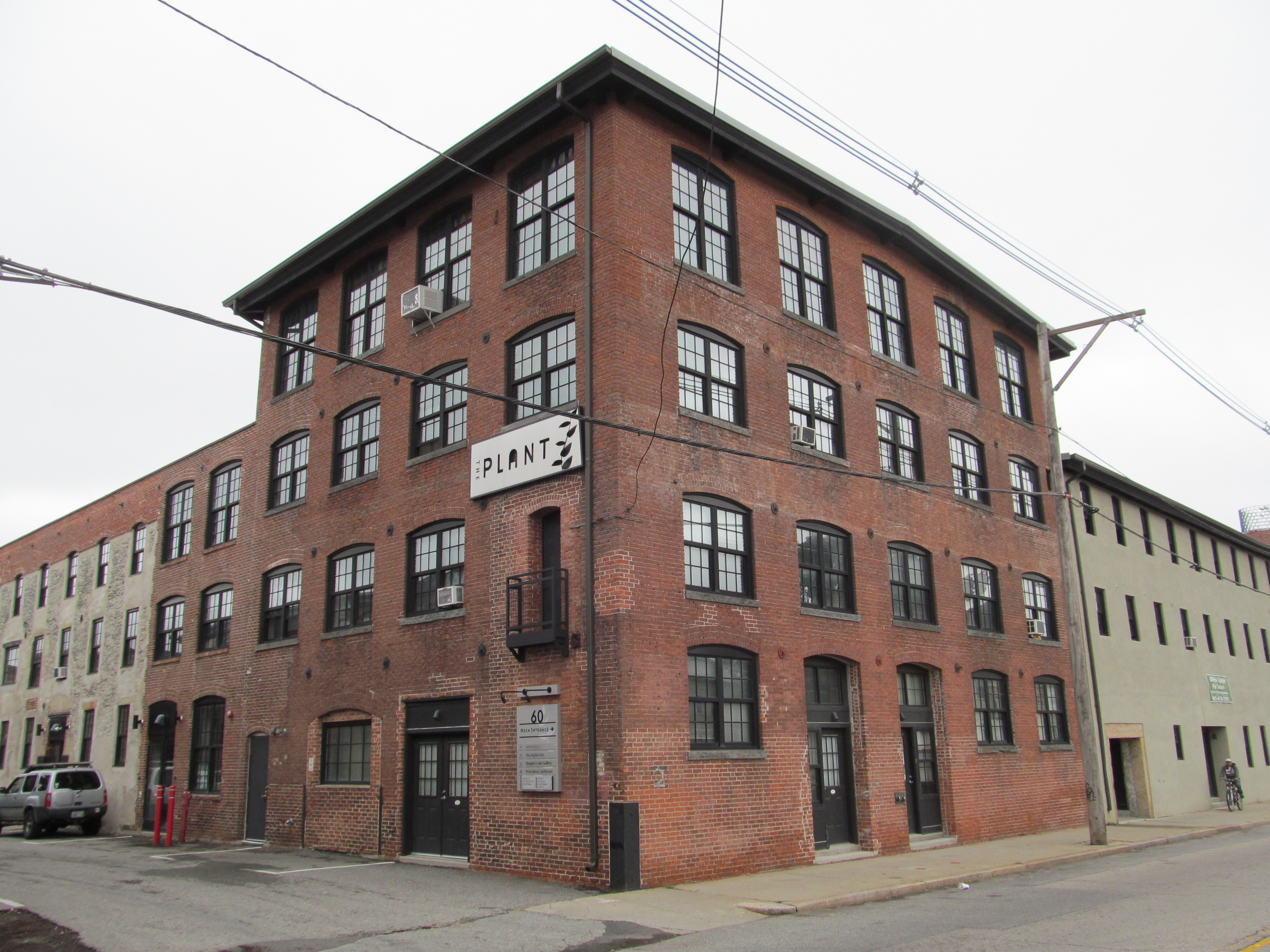
- Providence Dyeing, Bleaching, Calendring Company

- Location within Rhode Island Location within the United States
- Location: Providence, Rhode Island
- Coordinates: 41°49′7″N 71°26′31″W
- Area: 4 acres (1.6 ha)
- Built: 1837
- Architect: Frank P. Sheldon
- NRHP reference No.: 04000809
- Added to NRHP: October 18, 2004

Providence Dyeing, Bleaching, Calendring Company (or Valley Bleachery) is an historic industrial complex located at 46,50,52,60 Valley Street and 80 Delaine Street in Providence, Rhode Island. It consists of 18 small-to-medium-sized brick and stone structures in a parcel 4 acres (1.6 ha) in size, between Valley Street and the Woonasquatucket River. Although most of these buildings were constructed between 1900 and 1920, the oldest building in the complex is a single-story rubble stone structure which may contain elements of an 18th-century mill structure, and is known to have achieved its present form around 1837. The original water privilege for this mill site was granted to Christopher Olney in 1773 for a paper mill.

The complex was listed on the National Register of Historic Places in 2004.

== See also ==
- National Register of Historic Places listings in Providence, Rhode Island
