= Jeremiah Dexter House =

1754 house in Rhode Island, United States

- U.S. National Register of Historic Places
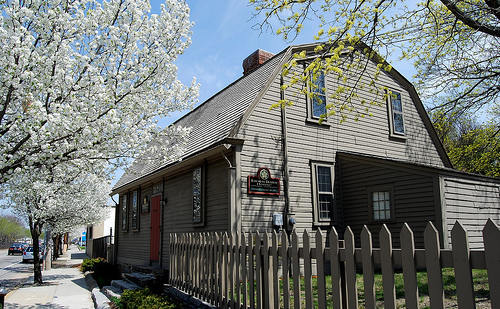

- Location within Rhode Island Location within the United States
- Location: 957 North Main Street, Providence, Rhode Island
- Coordinates: 41°50′48″N 71°24′19″W
- Built: 1754
- Architectural style: American Colonial
- NRHP reference No.: 76000046

Significant dates
- Added to NRHP: October 8, 1976
- Boundary increase: September 2, 1980

The Jeremiah Dexter House is a historic colonial house in Providence, Rhode Island. It is a 1 1/2-story gambrel-roofed wood-frame structure, built in 1754 for printer Jeremiah Dexter on farm land that was originally granted to his ancestor Gregory Dexter, a friend and printer for Roger Williams. It is five bays wide, with a large central chimney typical of the period, and is one of the few surviving colonial-era farmhouses in the city. The Dexter farm is further notable as the site where French Army troops were stationed upon their return from Virginia in 1782, during the American Revolutionary War. The paved parking lot which surrounds the house on two sides is believed to contain archaeological remains of the French camp.

The house was added to the National Register of Historic Places in 1976.

== See also ==
- National Register of Historic Places in Providence, Rhode Island
