= Perkins Buildings =

- U.S. National Register of Historic Places
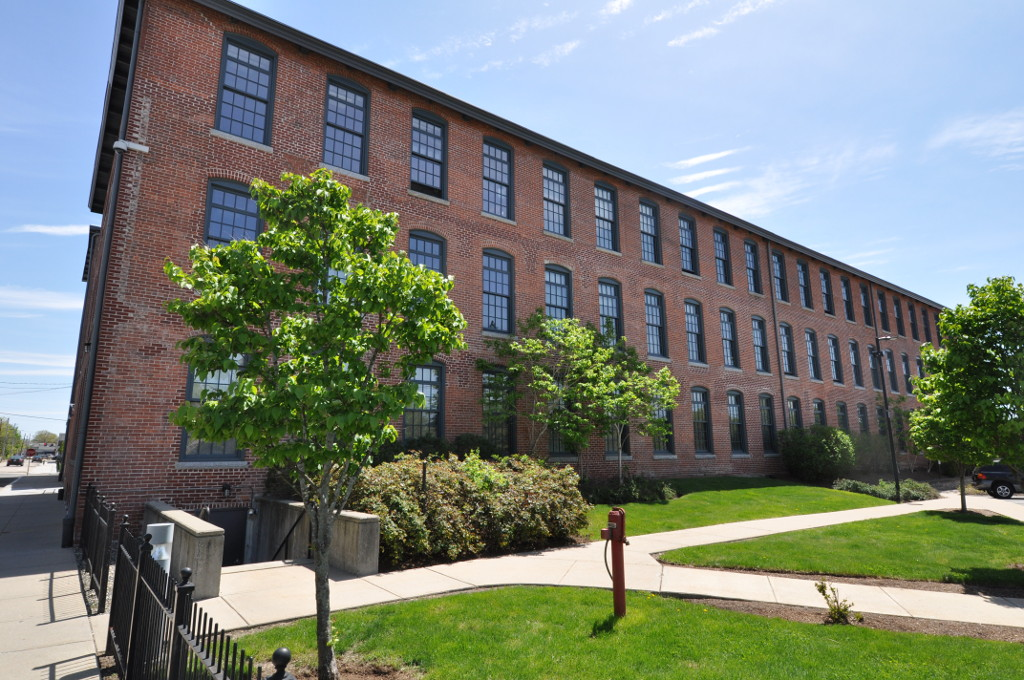

- Location within Rhode Island Location within the United States
- Location: Providence, Rhode Island
- Coordinates: 41°48′37″N 71°25′40″W
- Area: 2.5 acres (1.0 ha)
- Built: 1887
- Architect: Freeborn Johnson
- NRHP reference No.: 03001521
- Added to NRHP: January 30, 2004

The Perkins Buildings are a group of three historic industrial buildings located at 85 Sprague Street, 101 and 102 Westfield Street in Providence, Rhode Island. They were built between 1887 and 1892 by Charles H. Perkins, and were originally occupied by separate industrial tenants. Two of the buildings (85 Sprague and 102 Westfield) are brick structures built in 1892 and 1890, respectively, while the 1887 mill at 101 Westfield is a wood-frame structure, a rare 19th-century survivor in the state. These buildings were consolidated into a single industrial complex in the first half of the 20th century by the Rau Fastener Company, which operated on the premises until 1994.

The buildings were listed on the National Register of Historic Places in 2004.

== See also ==
- National Register of Historic Places listings in Providence, Rhode Island
