= Morris Brown House =

Historic house in Rhode Island, United States

- U.S. National Register of Historic Places
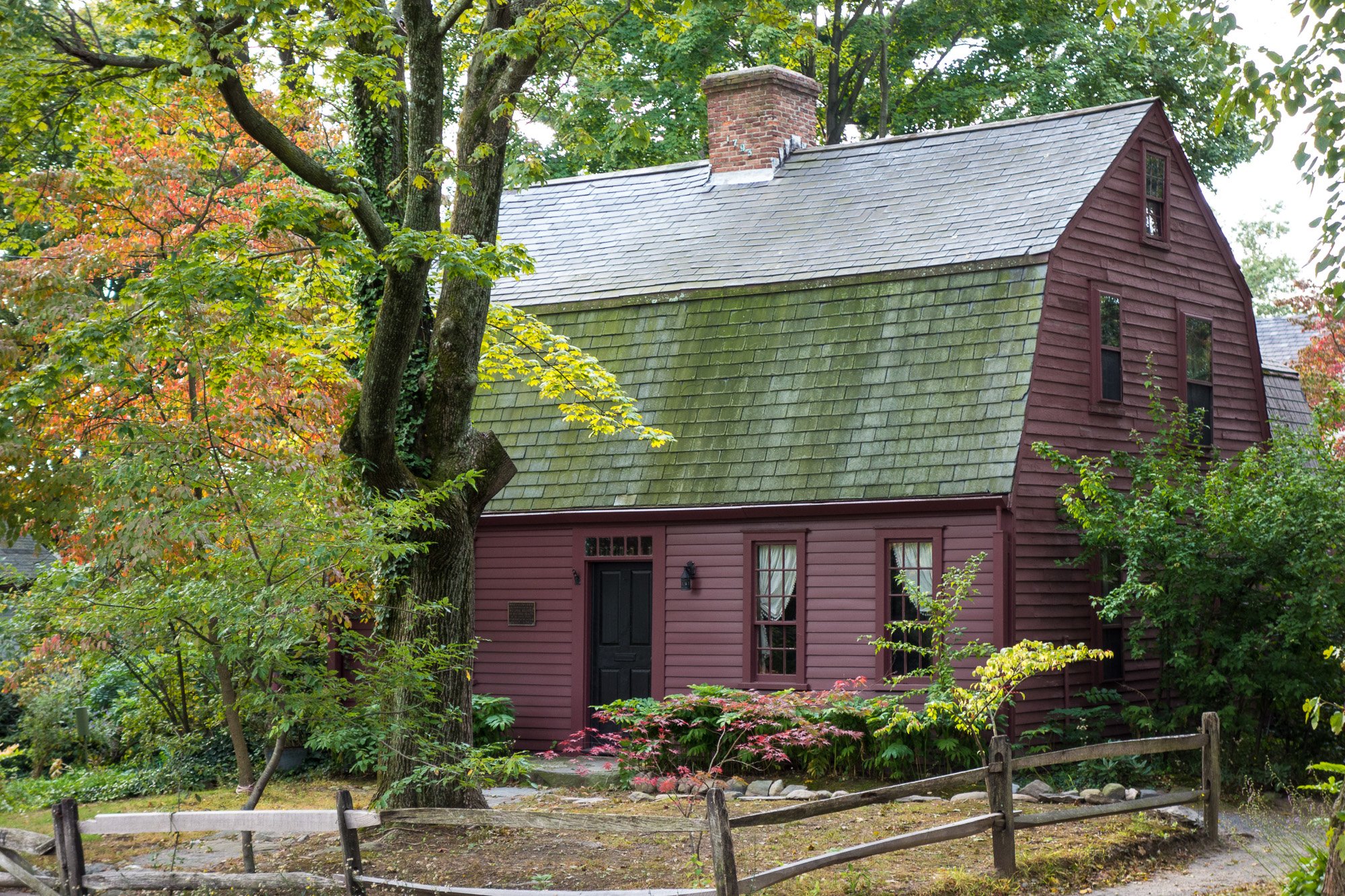

- Location within Rhode Island Location within the United States
- Location: 317 Rochambeau Ave., Providence, Rhode Island
- Coordinates: 41°50′48″N 71°23′39″W
- Built: 1793
- Architectural style: Colonial
- NRHP reference No.: 91001025
- Added to NRHP: August 22, 1991

The Morris Brown House is a historic house located in Providence, Rhode Island. The house was listed on the National Register of Historic Places on August 22, 1991.

== Description and history ==
It is a 1 1/2-story gambrel-roofed wood-frame structure with a large central chimney. The main block is four bays wide and three deep, with a rear ell connecting the house to a 20th-century garage. Documentary evidence suggests it was built in 1793, while architectural evidence suggests an earlier construction date. The house is a well-preserved example of a typical vernacular 18th-century Rhode Island farmhouse, and is one of the few 18th century houses remaining in the city.

== See also ==
- National Register of Historic Places listings in Providence, Rhode Island
