= William J. Braitsch and Company Plant =

- U.S. National Register of Historic Places
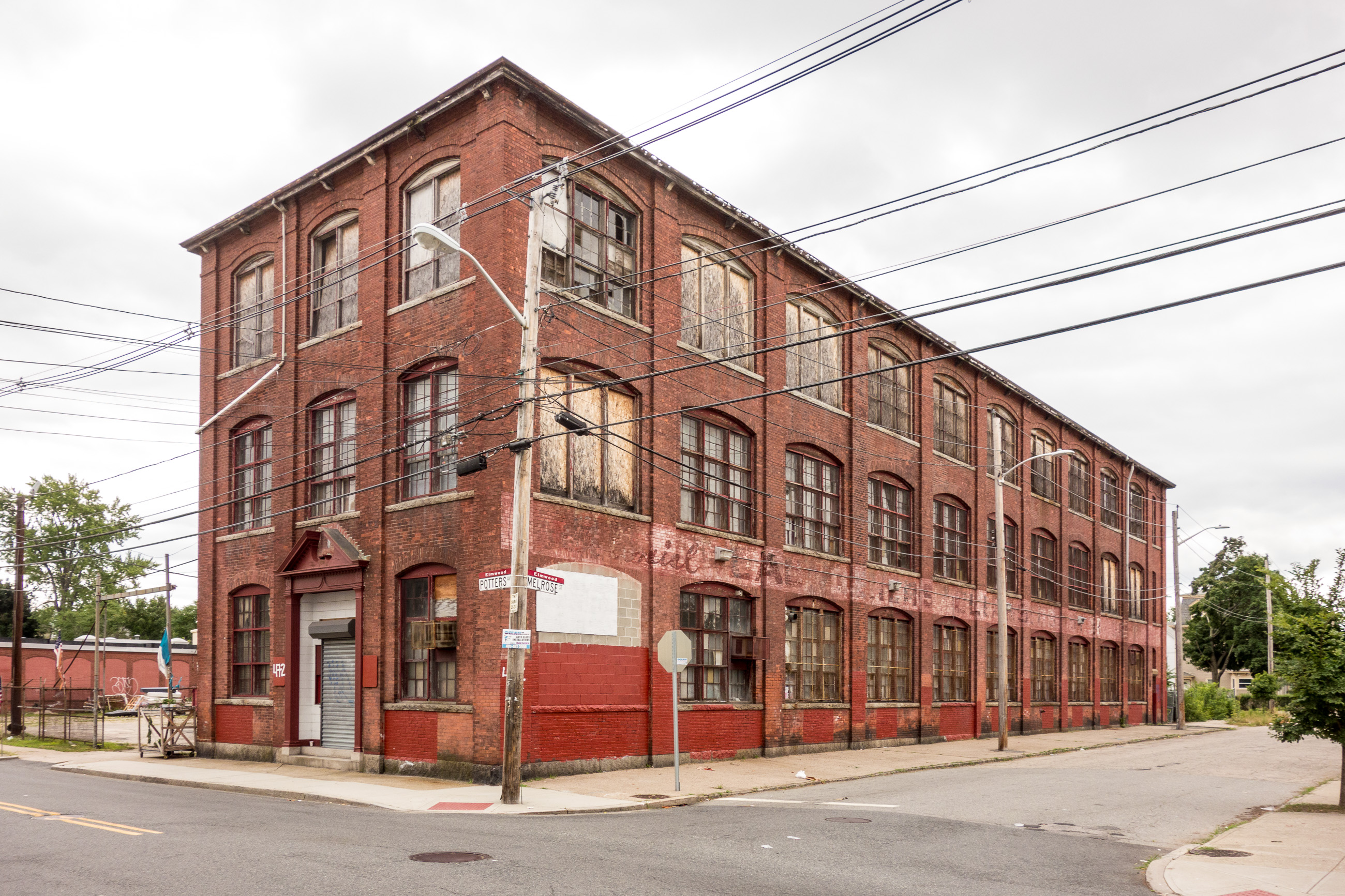

- Location within Rhode Island Location within the United States
- Location: 472 Potters Ave. Providence, Rhode Island
- Coordinates: 41°48′5″N 71°25′28″W
- Area: 0.7 acres (0.28 ha)
- Built: 1892
- Built by: Nathan B. Horton
- Architect: George W. Cady
- Architectural style: Late 19th Century Industrial
- NRHP reference No.: 16000443
- Added to NRHP: July 11, 2016

The William J. Braitsch and Company Plant is a historic industrial building at 472 Potters Avenue in Providence, Rhode Island. Built in 1892, it played a key role in the development of the silversmithing industry in the city. It was listed on the National Register of Historic Places in 2016.

== History and architecture ==
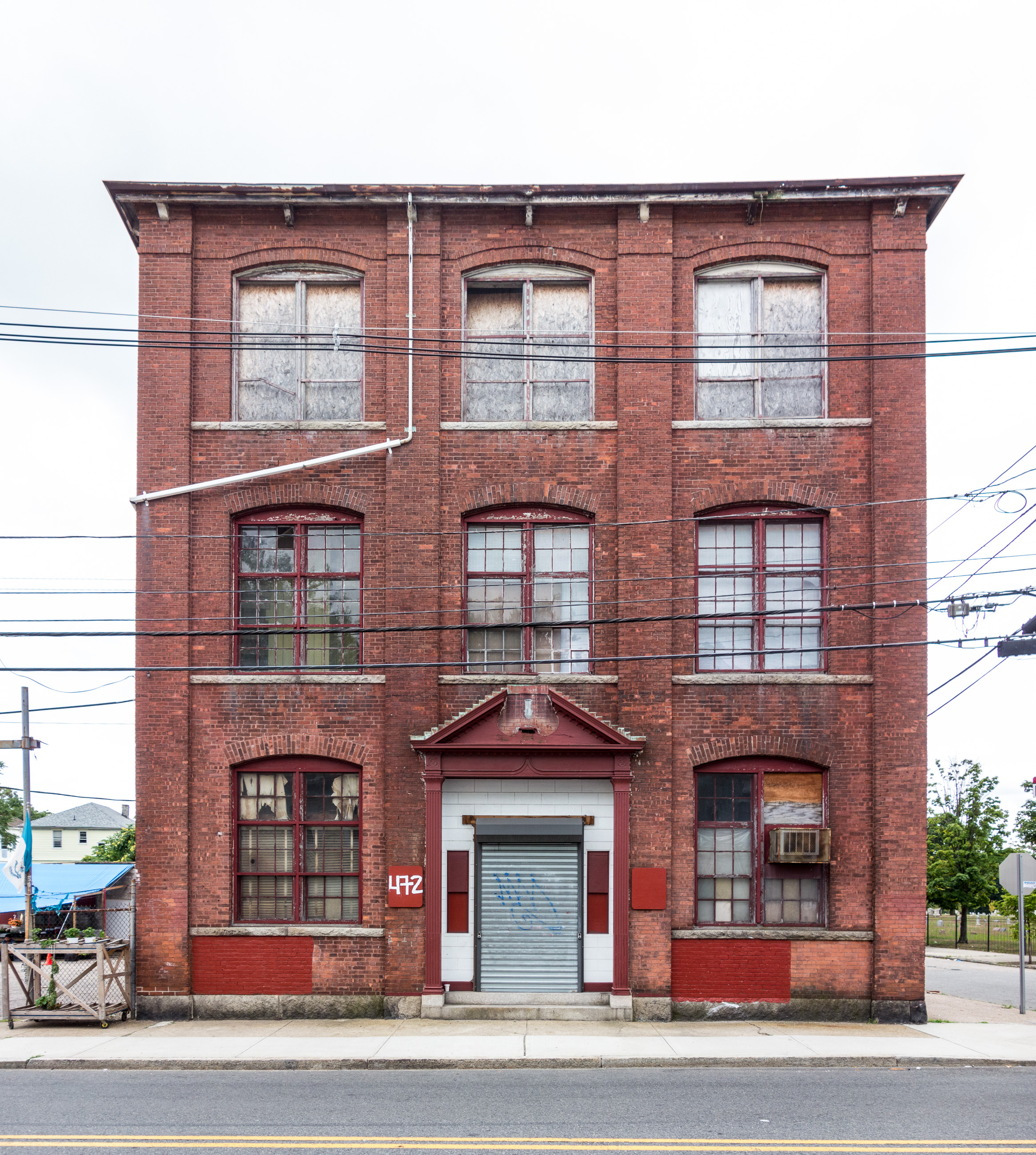
Front view.

The Braitsch Company Plant is located in Providence's Elmwood residential neighborhood, at the southeast corner of Potters Avenue and Melrose Street. William J. Braitsch was a native of New York City who apprenticed at the studio of Louis Comfort Tiffany in the jewelry trade. He and a partner, John Hearn, moved to Providence in 1887, where they opened a shop from which they manufactured heads for walking canes. In 1890 they built this building, which was designed by architect George W. Cady and built by contractor Nathan B. Horton. It was completed by 1892. The principal building of the plant is a three-story masonry building, built out of brick with stone trim. Decorative features include segmented-arched windows set in recessed panels, with brick pilastered piers rising to a projecting cornice. It has a shallow pitch gabled roof covered by membrane. The interior has slow-burning timber frame construction with heavy plank flooring, the frame and floor both having been reinforced by steel in some places. Attached to the main building's east side is a smaller boiler house, and there is on the property a freestanding concrete block "dry cleaning room" that is of mid-20th century construction.

Hearn & Braitsch built this plant as a manufacturing facility, but their partnership was dissolved in 1893 and operated exclusively thereafter by Braitsch. His business suffered due to the depression years of the 1890s, and eventually closed in 1915. As his business declined, Braitsch leased floor space in the facility to other manufacturers, mainly also in the jewelry business, and the building was taken over in its entirety by what became known as the Colonial Laundry in 1915. The business operated here until 1965, when it was readapted for jewelry manufacture. Since 1987 it has seen low-level uses such as storage.

== See also ==
- National Register of Historic Places listings in Providence, Rhode Island
