= Bridgham–Arch–Wilson Streets Historic District =

Historic district in Rhode Island, United States

- U.S. National Register of Historic Places
- U.S. Historic district
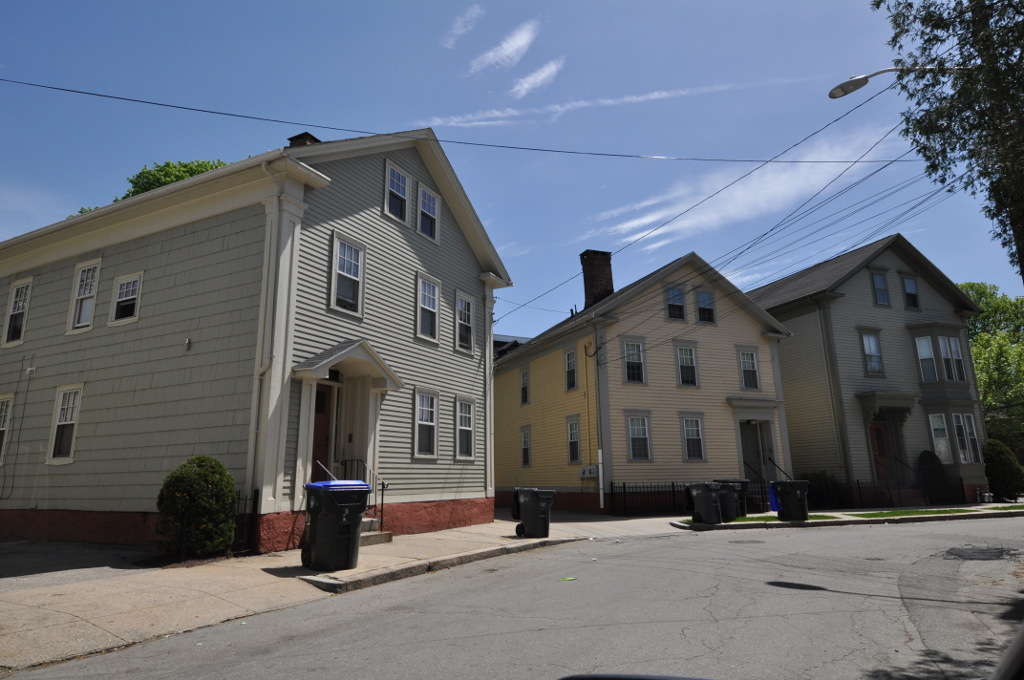

- Location within Rhode Island Location within the United States
- Location: Roughly bounded by Lester and Bridgham Sts., Elmwood Ave., Warren and Dexter Sts., Providence, Rhode Island
- Coordinates: 41°48′43″N 71°25′36″W
- Area: 20 acres (8.1 ha)
- Architect: Multiple
- Architectural style: Greek Revival, Italianate, Octagon Mode
- NRHP reference No.: 88001433
- Added to NRHP: September 01, 1988

The Bridgham–Arch–Wilson Streets Historic District is a predominantly residential historic district in Providence, Rhode Island. It is located southwest of downtown Providence, and was developed beginning in the 1840s as a suburban part of the city. It is roughly in the shape of a boot, roughly bounded by Cranston, Bridgham, Elmwood, and Harrison Streets. Most of the housing is architecturally reflective of the mid-19th century, with the Greek Revival, Italianate, and Second Empire styles well represented. Development in the area slowed in the late 19th and early 20th centuries, so there are only a modest number of Queen Anne, Stick style, and Colonial Revival properties. Most of the houses are either 1-1/2 or 2 1/2-story wood-frame structures, and are generally set on fairly small lots. There are 175 primary buildings in the district, of which more than 150 are historically significant.

The district was added to the National Register of Historic Places in 1988.

== See also ==
- National Register of Historic Places listings in Providence, Rhode Island
