= Andrew Dickhaut Cottages Historic District =

Historic district in Rhode Island, United States

- U.S. National Register of Historic Places
- U.S. Historic district
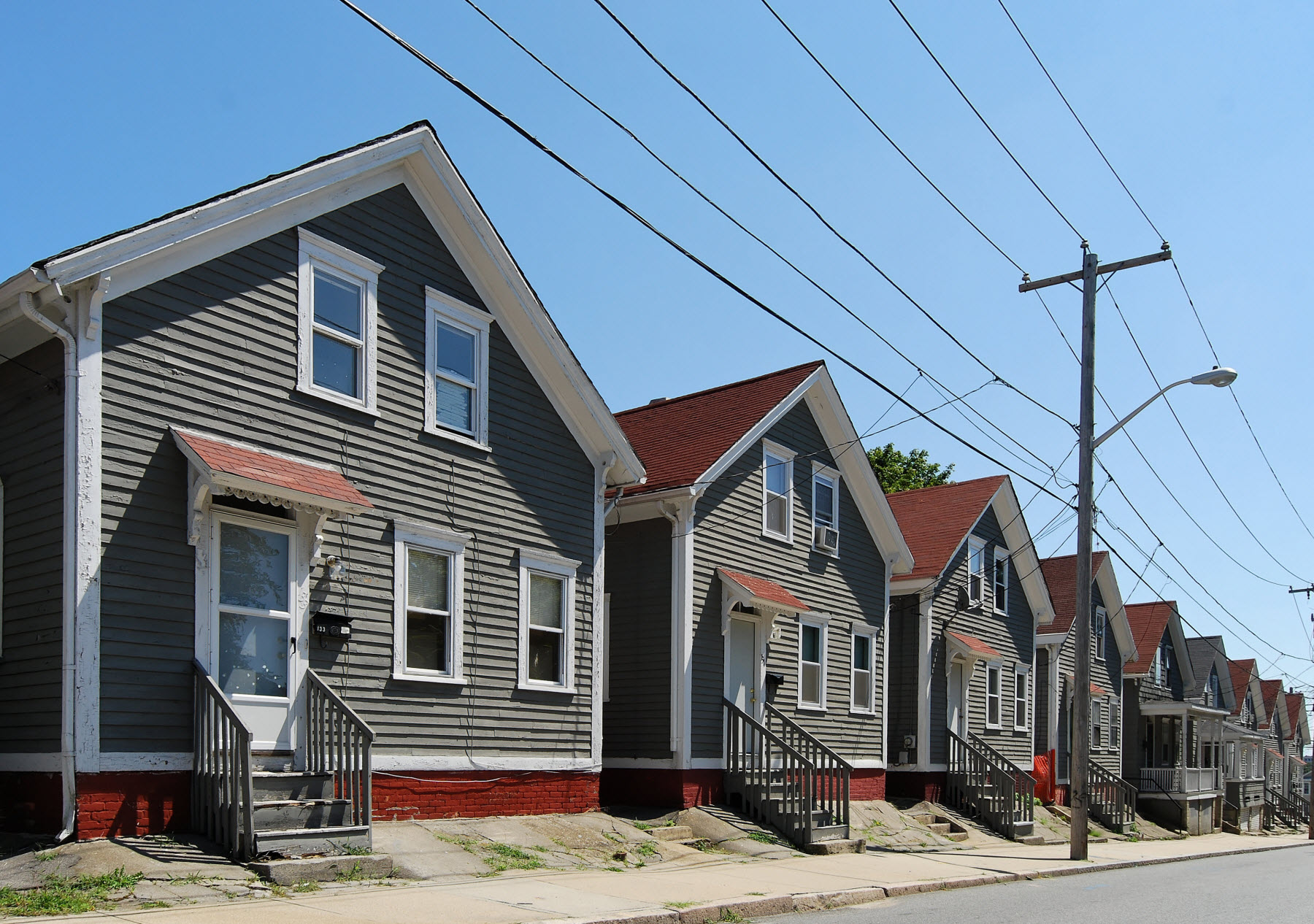

- Location within Rhode Island Location within the United States
- Location: Providence, Rhode Island
- Coordinates: 41°50′0″N 71°25′33″W
- Built: 1844
- Architect: Andrew Dickhaut
- NRHP reference No.: 84001904
- Added to NRHP: February 23, 1984

The Andrew Dickhaut Cottages Historic District encompasses a collection of historic worker cottages in the Smith Hill neighborhood of Providence, Rhode Island, along with the home of their builder, Andrew Dickhaut. The cottages are located at 114—141 Bath Street (odd numbers), 6-18 Duke Street (even numbers), and the Dickhaut house is located at 377 Orms Street. The cottages are virtually identical 1 1/2-story wood-frame structures, set on small lots close to the sidewalk. Those on Bath Street were built in 1882, while those on Duke Street were built in 1892. This collection represents a remarkably well-preserved collection of worker housing, a building form which is often poorly documented.

The district was added to the National Register of Historic Places in 1984.

== See also ==
- National Register of Historic Places listings in Providence, Rhode Island
