= John Corliss House =

Historic house in Rhode Island, United States

- U.S. National Register of Historic Places
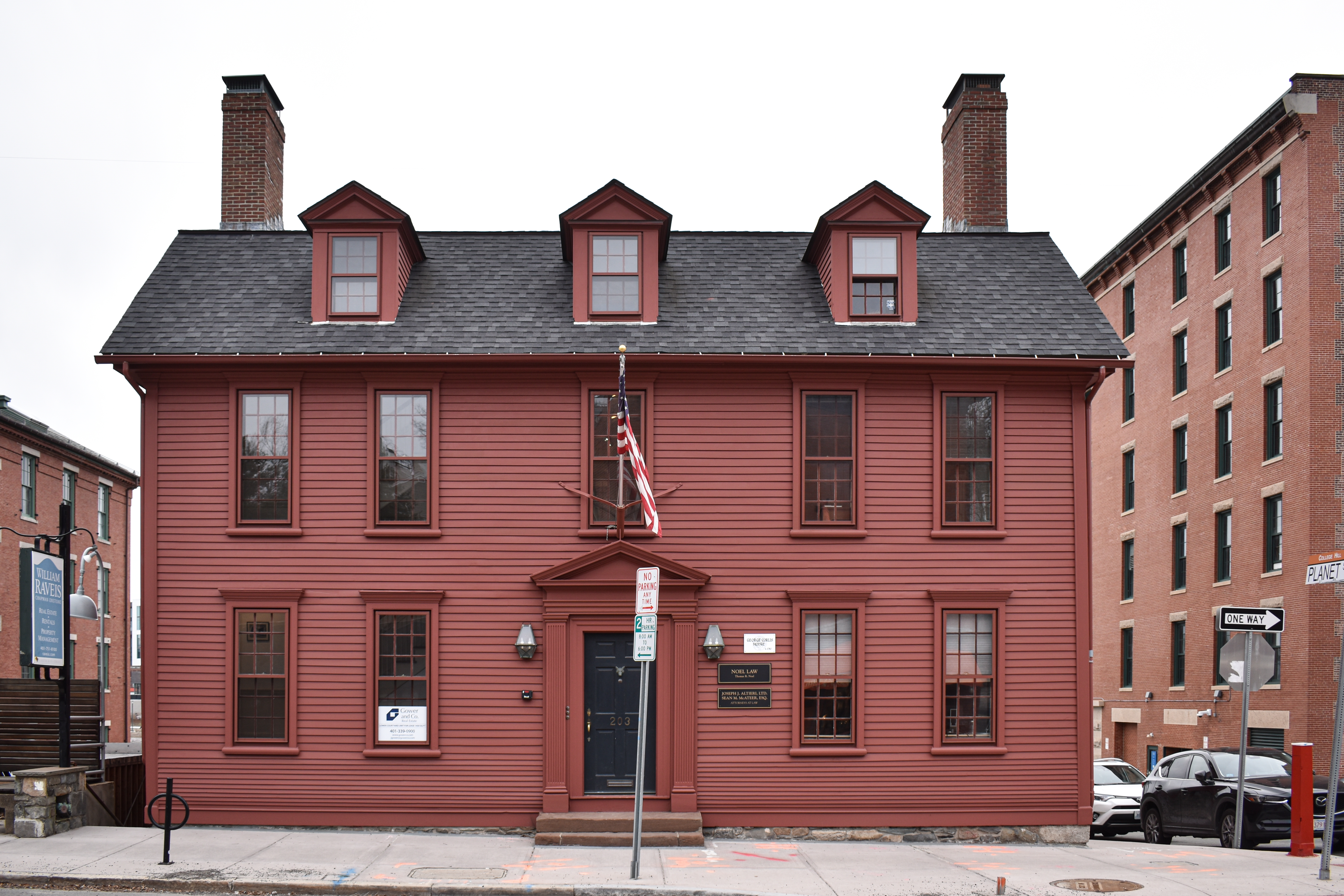

- Location within Rhode Island Location within the United States
- Location: 201 South Main Street, Providence, Rhode Island
- Coordinates: 41°49′23″N 71°24′24″W
- Built: 1746
- NRHP reference No.: 74000049
- Added to NRHP: May 1, 1974

The John Corliss House (or Kilton–Wilkinson House) is an historic house in Providence, Rhode Island.

The house is a 2 1/2-story wood-frame structure with a gambrel roof, built c. 1746–1750 as a duplex, housing the families of Dinah Kilton and David Wilkinson. Both sides of the house were acquired by 1763 by George Corliss, who converted it to single-family use. The exterior has relatively plain Georgian styling, while the interior has been the subject of significant alteration, due to Corliss' alterations as well as later renovations. In the 20th century the property was used for commercial retail purposes, and some of its additions were eventually destroyed by fire. John Corliss, the son of George, was a prominent businessman who contributed significantly to the economic development of Providence in the decades around the turn of the 19th century.

This house is one of the few pre-Revolutionary buildings to survive an 1801 fire in the area, and now sits somewhat incongruously in an area occupied mostly by larger commercial brick buildings.

The house was listed on the National Register of Historic Places in 1974.

== Gallery ==
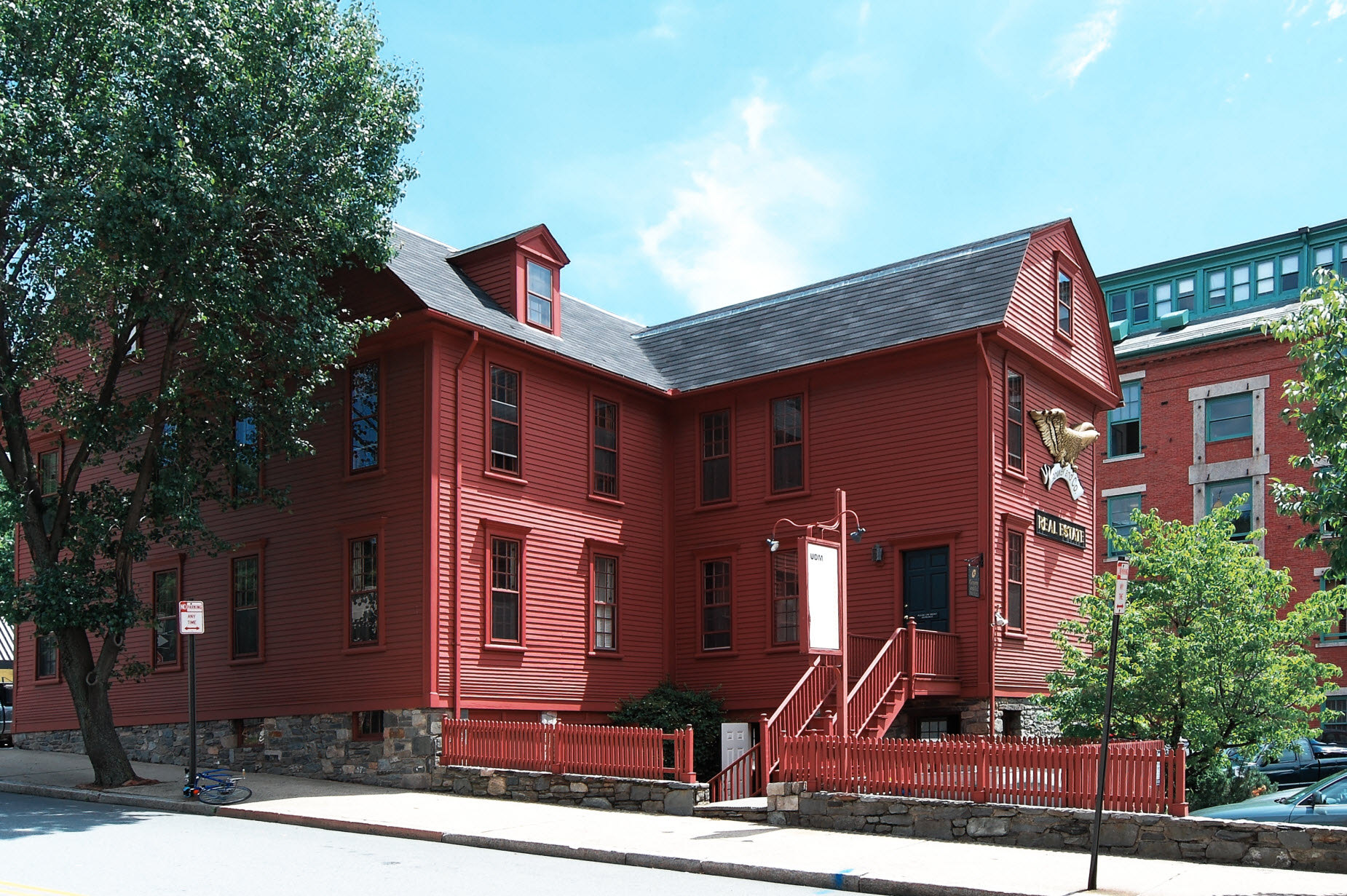

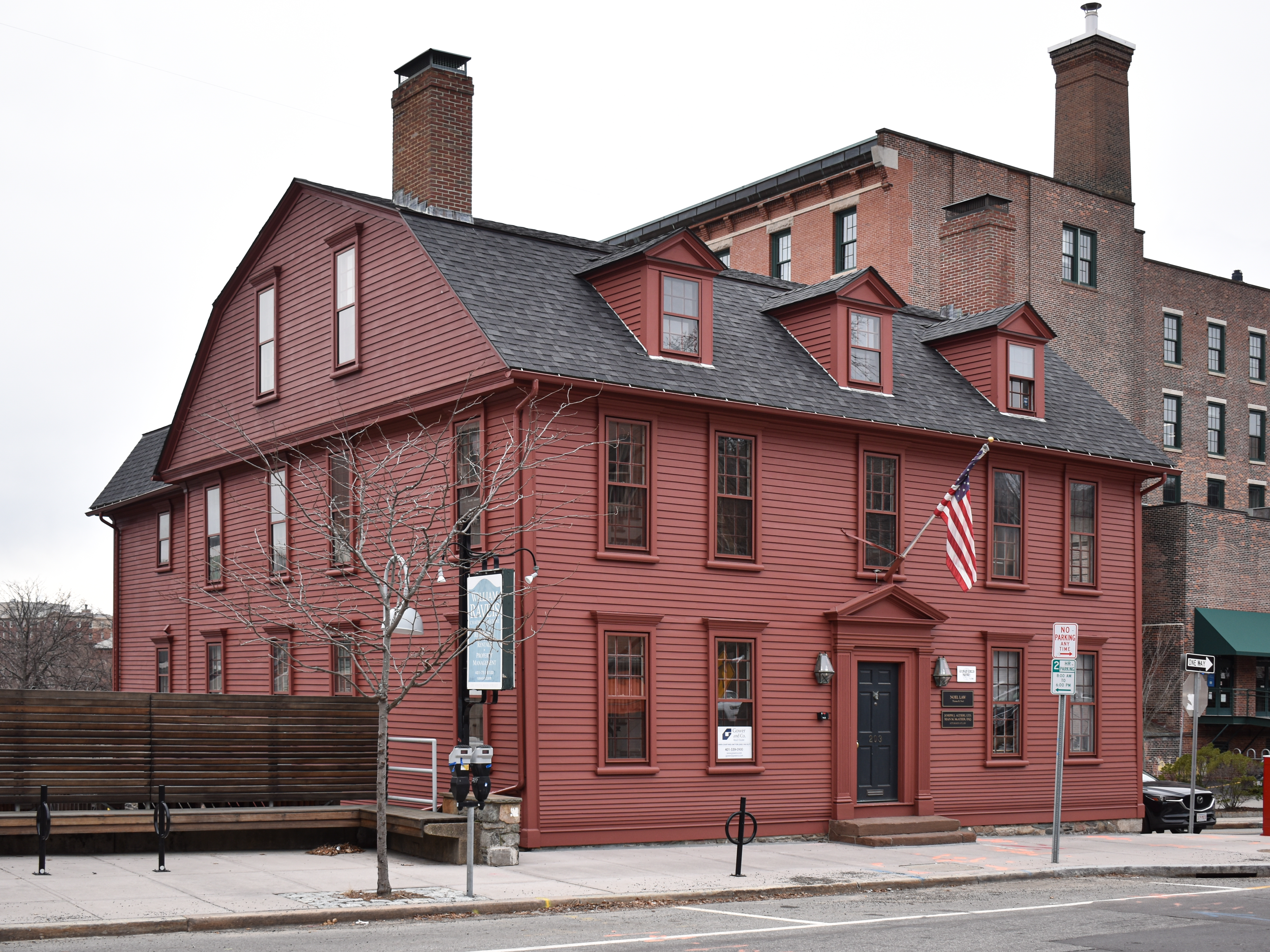

== See also ==
- National Register of Historic Places listings in Providence, Rhode Island
