= Plymouth Congregational Church (Providence, Rhode Island) =

Historic church in Rhode Island, United States

- U.S. National Register of Historic Places
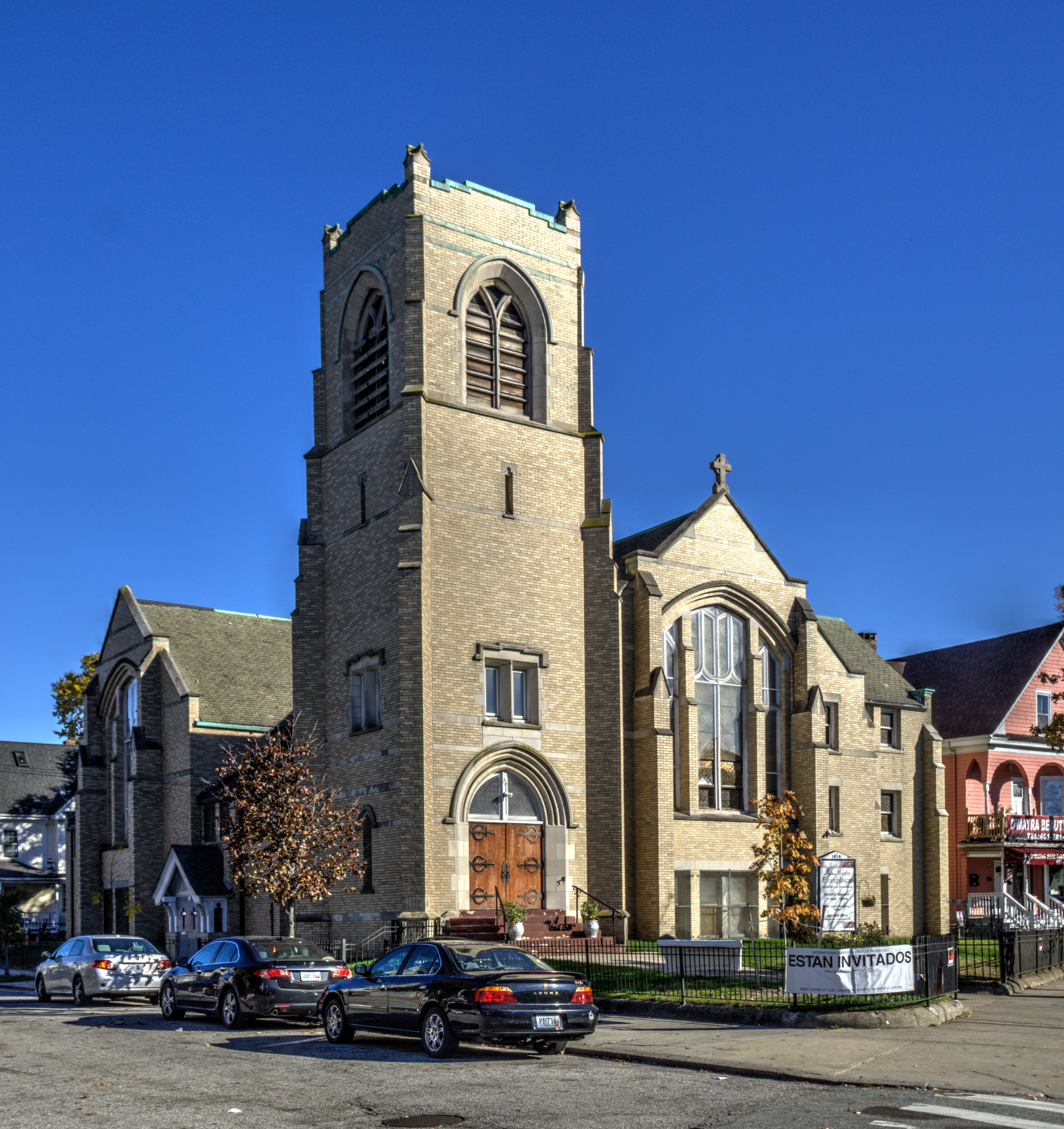

- Location within Rhode Island Location within the United States
- Location: 1014 Broad Street, Providence, Rhode Island
- Coordinates: 41°47′50″N 71°24′48″W
- Built: 1915
- Architect: George F. Newton
- Architectural style: Late Gothic Revival
- NRHP reference No.: 100006299
- Added to NRHP: March 12, 2021

The Plymouth Congregational Church is an historic church building at 1014 Broad Street in Providence, Rhode Island. Completed in 1919 for a congregation founded in 1878, it is a well-preserved example of late Gothic Revival architecture, designed by Boston architect George F. Newton. Since 2016, the building has been home to the Iglesia Visión Evangélica congregation. It was listed on the National Register of Historic Places in 2021.

== Architecture and history ==
The former Plymouth Congregational Church is located at the eastern edge of the Elmwood neighborhood and western edge of Lower South Providence, at the southeast corner of Broad Street and Pennsylvania Avenue. It is a large stone structure, with a square tower rising in the front left corner. Buttresses adorn the sides of the building and the tower corners, and a large stained-glass window dominates the gabled Broad Street facade. The main entrance is in the base of the tower, with heavy wooden doors set in a Gothic-arched opening with transom windows. The interior follows a modified Akron plan, specifically designed to accommodate large Sunday School classes.

The church was built in 1915-1919 for a congregation founded nearby in 1878; it was its third edifice. It was designed by George F. Newton, an architect based in Boston, Massachusetts. Planning for the building began as early as 1891, when the congregation purchased the lot where it stands. Its design and construction were delayed by funding considerations, and its construction was interrupted by World War I. It was formally dedicated on March 2, 1919.

In 1927, Plymouth Congregational Church merged with Union Congregational Church. Its combined membership of 1,200 made it one of the largest Protestant churches in Providence. However, by 1968 the congregation had shrunk to about 140 members, due to members moving to the suburbs.

The building was sold in 1971 to the Rhode Island Conference of the United Church of Christ, which that same year sold the building to the Holy Cross Church of God in Christ, a 260-member Black congregation, which remained there until 2015.

Iglesia Visión Evangélica, a Latin congregation, acquired the church in 2016. Leaders of the congregation nominated the property to the National Register of Historic Places, to recognize the building's historic significance. The nomination itself is significant as the first bilingual National Register nomination.

== See also ==
- National Register of Historic Places listings in Providence, Rhode Island
