= Elmwood Historic District =

Historic district in Rhode Island, United States

- U.S. National Register of Historic Places
- U.S. Historic district
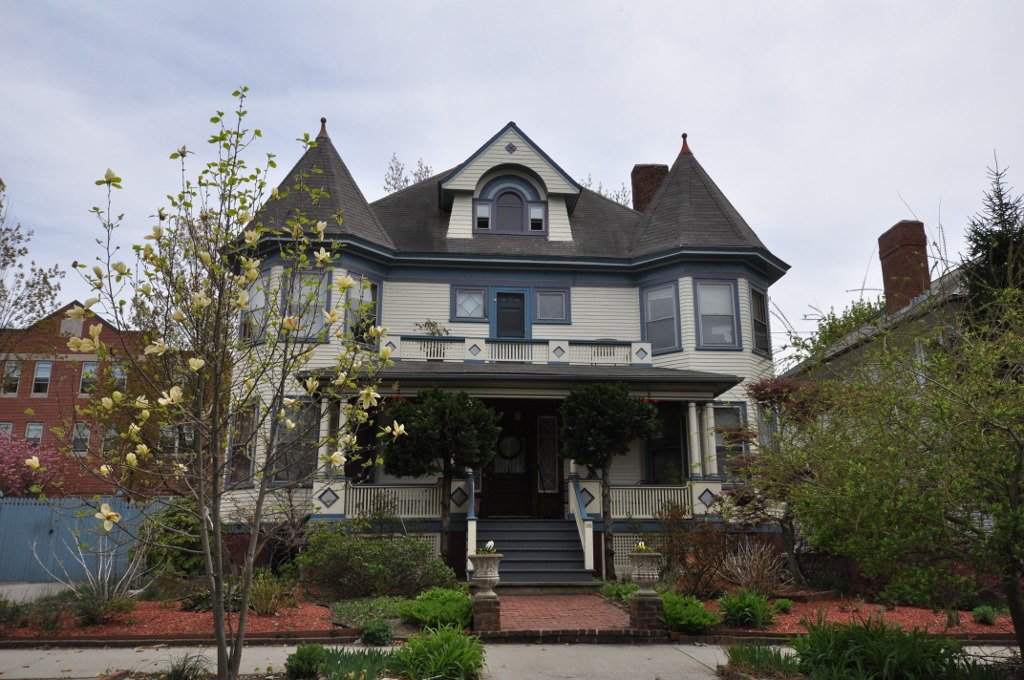
- A house on Lexington Avenue

- Location within Rhode Island Location within the United States
- Location: Providence, Rhode Island
- Coordinates: 41°47′54″N 71°25′14″W
- Area: 25 acres (10 ha) (north section); 39 acres (16 ha) (south section)
- Built: 1875
- Architect: Multiple
- Architectural style: Late 19th And 20th Century Revivals, Late Victorian
- MPS: Elmwood MRA
- NRHP reference No.: 80004603
- Added to NRHP: January 7, 1980

The Elmwood Historic District encompasses two large residential sections of the Elmwood neighborhood of Providence, Rhode Island. The Elmwood area was mainly farmland until the mid-19th century, when its development as a residential area began, and these two sections represents well-preserved neighborhoods developed between about 1850 and 1920. The district was listed on the National Register of Historic Places in 1980.

The northern enclave of the district is roughly bounded by Elmwood Avenue on the west, and extends east along Whitmarsh Street and Princeton Avenue most of the way to Broad Street. It also includes the western half of the blocks of Moore, Dabol, and Mawney Streets adjacent to Elmwood, as well as the Knight Memorial Library, which is the neighborhood's finest public structure. This area features a concentration of Second Empire houses along Moore, Dabol, and Mawney, and Queen Anne and Colonial Revival houses on Princeton and Whitmarsh.

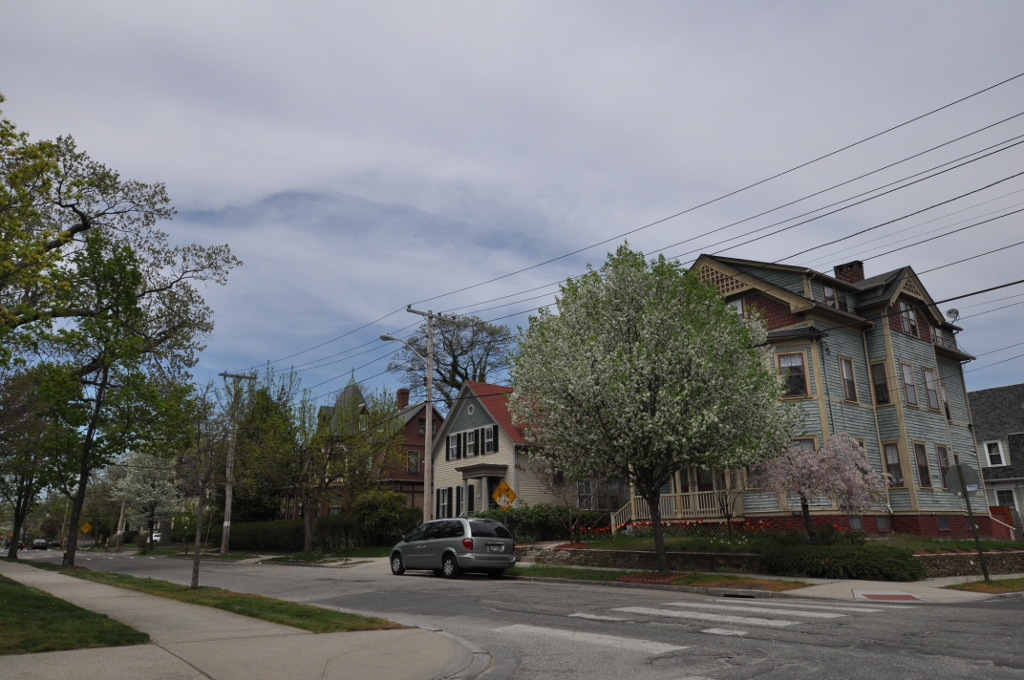
Houses on Melrose Street

The southern enclave is also bounded on the west by Elmwood Avenue, and extends from Congress Avenue to Adelaide Avenue, including Columbus Square, where the separately-listed Columbus statue formerly stood. It extends eastward on Adelaide as far as Emerson Street, and along the other side streets to the far side of Melrose Street. This area is characterized by late 19th-century and early 20th century construction, predominantly Queen Anne and Colonial Revival in style. Lot sizes are more generous than those in the northern section.

== See also ==
- National Register of Historic Places listings in Providence, Rhode Island
