= Richard Henry Deming House =

Historic house in Rhode Island, United States

- U.S. National Register of Historic Places
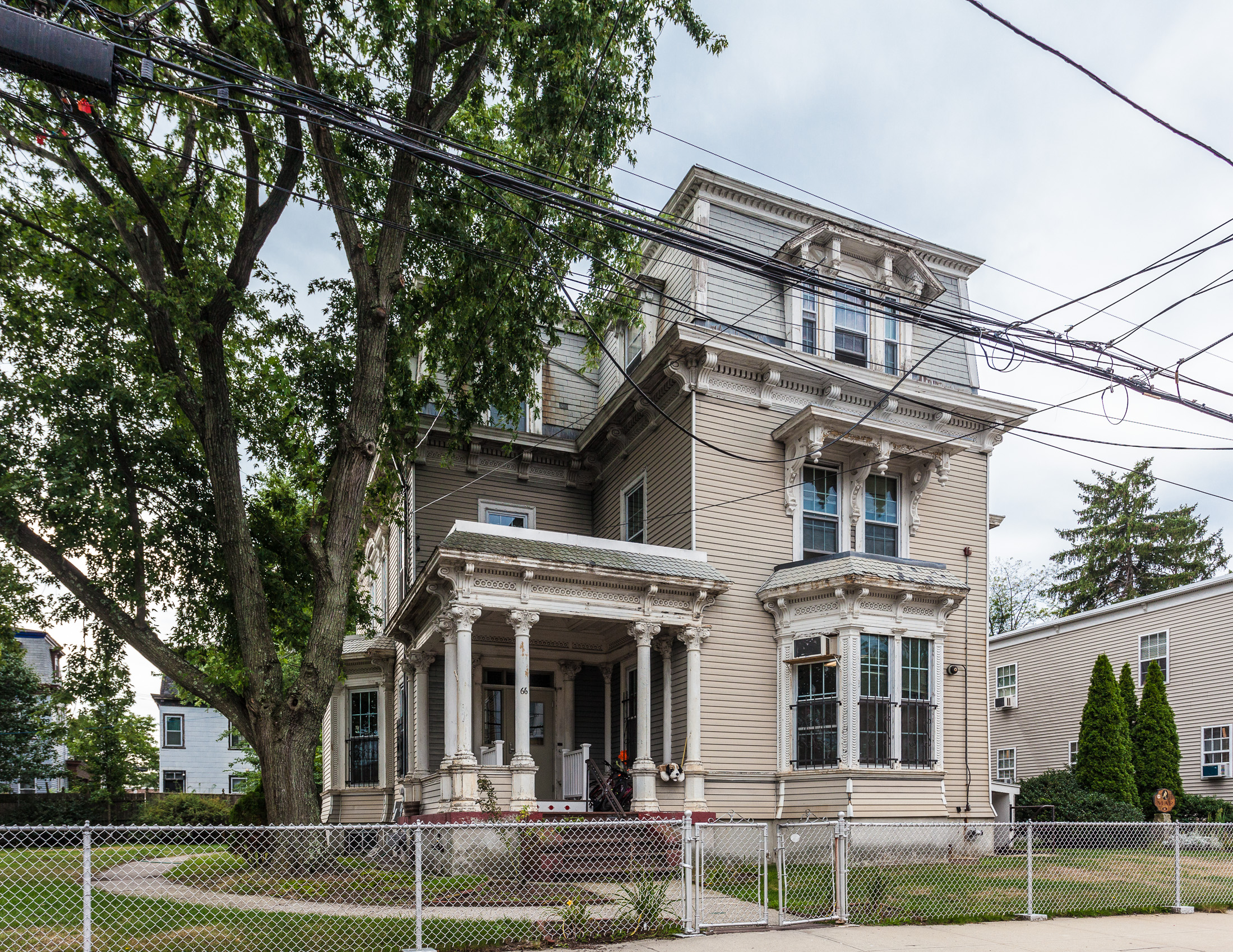
- Richard Henry Deming House in 2013

- Location within Rhode Island Location within the United States
- Location: 66 Burnett Street, Providence, Rhode Island
- Coordinates: 41°48′9″N 71°25′38″W
- Built: 1870
- Architectural style: Second Empire
- MPS: Elmwood MRA
- NRHP reference No.: 80000094
- Added to NRHP: January 7, 1980

The Richard Henry Deming House is a historic home in Providence, Rhode Island. It is a 2 1/2-story wood-frame structure, and is one of the most elaborate Second Empire mansions in the city's Elmwood neighborhood. Built c. 1870 for a wealthy cotton broker, it has a mansard roof, bracketed window hoods, and an elaborately decorated front porch. It has retained much of its interior woodwork, despite its conversion to apartments.

The house was listed on the National Register of Historic Places in 1980.

== Richard Henry Deming ==
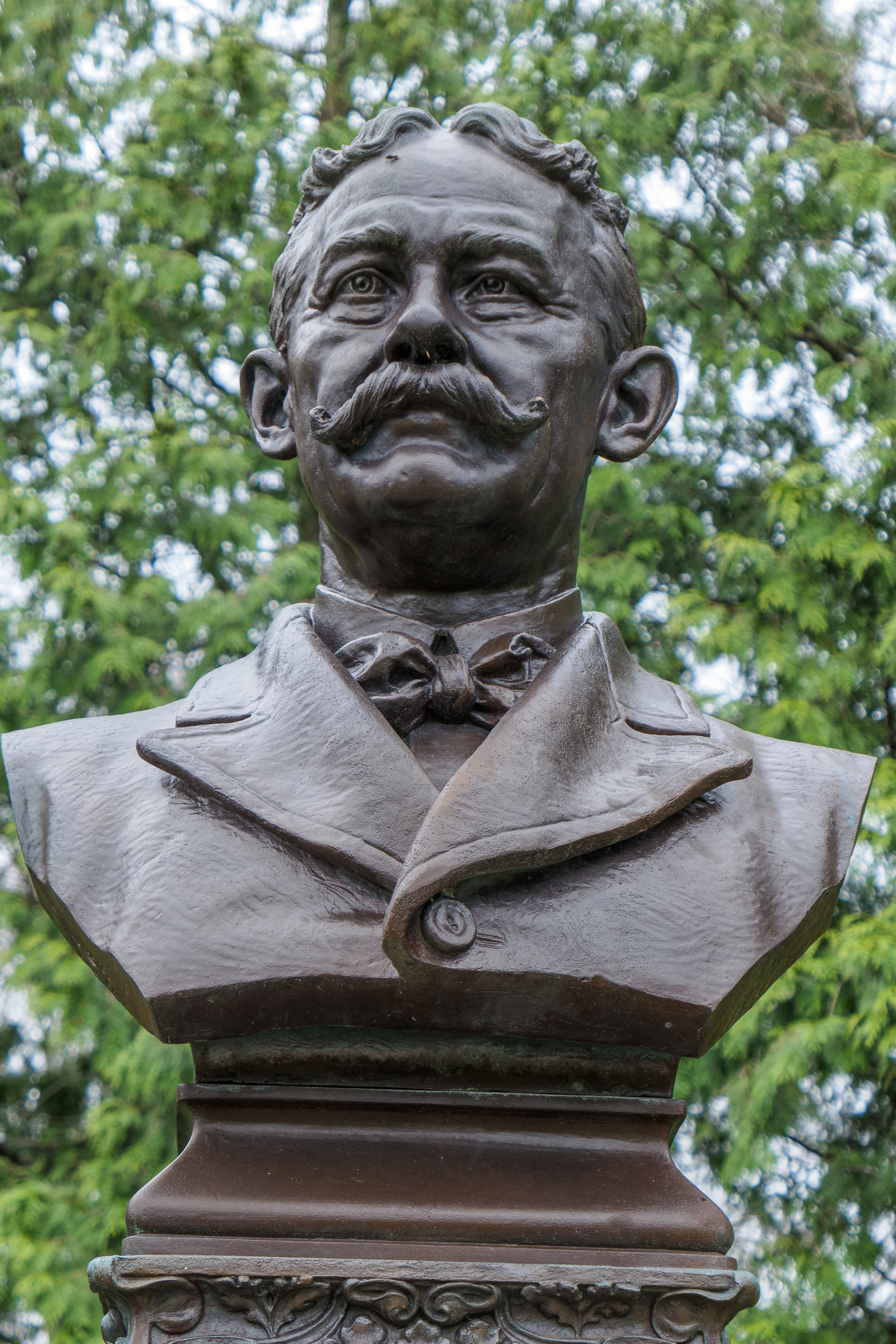
Bust of Deming

Richard H. Deming served on the Providence City Council, and as city police commissioner. He served as president of the Providence Board of Park Commissioners from 1892 to 1902. As parks commissioner, Deming oversaw the construction of the Boathouse and Casino at Roger Williams Park. A memorial to Deming was erected in the park in 1904.

== See also ==
- National Register of Historic Places listings in Providence, Rhode Island
