= Statue of Christopher Columbus (Johnston, Rhode Island) =

Sculpture by Frédéric Auguste Bartholdi

- Columbus
- U.S. National Register of Historic Places
- U.S. Historic district – Contributing property
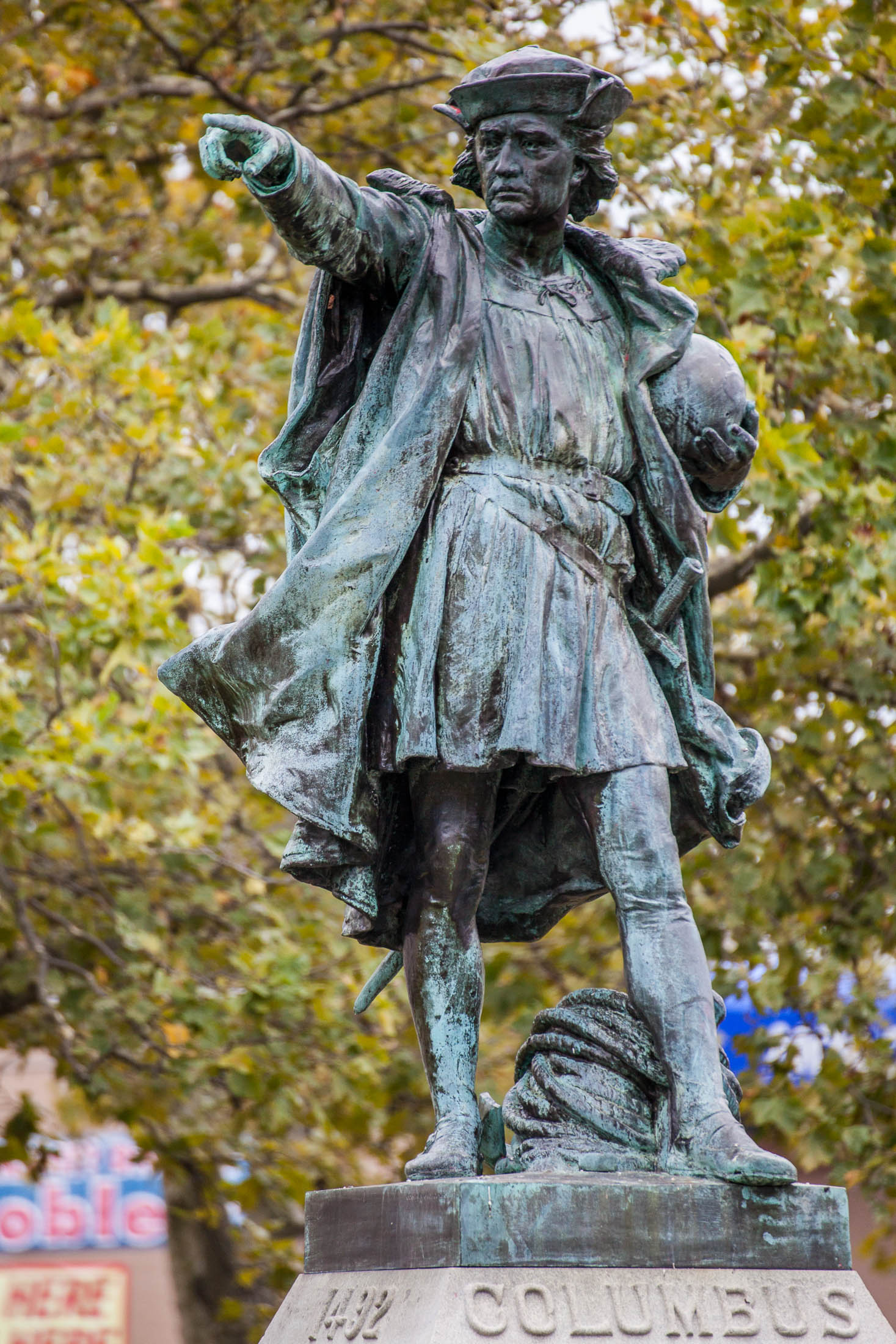

- Location within Rhode Island Location within the United States
- Location: Johnston, Rhode Island
- Coordinates: 41°49′37.28″N 71°30′26.1″W
- Built: 1893
- Architect: Frederic Auguste Bartholdi
- Part of: Elmwood Historic District (ID80004603)
- MPS: Outdoor Sculpture of Rhode Island
- NRHP reference No.: 01000468

Significant dates
- Added to NRHP: October 19, 2001
- Designated CP: January 7, 1980

Columbus is a historic statue in Johnston, Rhode Island. The statue is a bronze cast of a sterling silver statue which was created by Rhode Island's Gorham Manufacturing Company for the 1892 World's Columbian Exposition in Chicago. The original silver statue was not meant for permanent exhibition, but rather as a demonstration of the skills of the Gorham Company, and was later melted down. The bronze cast was dedicated on November 8, 1893, in Columbus Square, in Providence, Rhode Island, United States as a gift from the Elmwood Association to the City of Providence.

The bronze statue was created in 1893 by Frédéric Auguste Bartholdi and added to the National Register of Historic Places in 2001. It was removed from Columbus Square in 2020 by the City of Providence and reinstalled in the nearby town of Johnston in 2023.

== History ==
=== Columbian Exposition ===
Cast in 1893, the statue of Columbus was produced by the Gorham Manufacturing Company who commissioned master sculptor, Auguste Bartholdi. The bronze statue is a cast of the original made of sterling silver, which was commissioned for the 1892 Columbian Exposition in Chicago, Illinois. For the upcoming exposition, Gorham wanted a demonstration piece to show the skill of its foundry and commissioned Bartholdi to create a statue of Columbus. The completed model was shipped across the Atlantic Ocean to be cast from 30,000 ounces of silver at Providence, Rhode Island. The casting was a ceremonial affair, where guests "were feted as they watched the process". Gorham officials accompanied and shipped the statue to Chicago via rail. It served as a demonstration piece at the exposition, showcasing the skill of its foundry in the technically difficult task of casting a work in sterling silver. After the exposition, the statue was returned to Providence where it was melted down: a silver statue was impractical as a permanent outdoor sculpture and the piece had already served its celebratory and advertisement purpose.

=== Bronze replica ===
In 1893, a bronze replica of Columbus was cast by the Gorham company and gifted to the City of Providence by the Elmwood Association, a civic group from a neighborhood near Gorham. It is known that Bartholdi visited Newport, Rhode Island in 1893, but it is unknown if he was involved in the production of the bronze cast. The statue was dedicated on November 8, 1893, at 2:30 p.m. Professor Alonzo Williams was the presenter of the statue to the city and Mayor Potter acted as "response on behalf the city". Music was provided by the Reeves American Band and the song "Columbus" was performed. The oration was given by Reverend H. W. Rugg and a chorus of children lead the crowd in singing "My Country, 'Tis of Thee". (Note: The New England Families, Genealogical and Memorial lists Professor Alonzo Williams as the orator, but his role as "Presenter to the city" may have been an editorial slip of otherwise precise wording. Williams had a speaking role as the presenter, but was not credited as giving the oration as specifically defined in the dedication pamphlet.) The site of the statue was originally deeded to the Town of Cranston by Joseph Cooke on May 24, 1824. The Town of Cranston deeded it to Providence in 1868 and renamed it Columbus Park in 1893.

=== Reactions ===
Columbus over the years

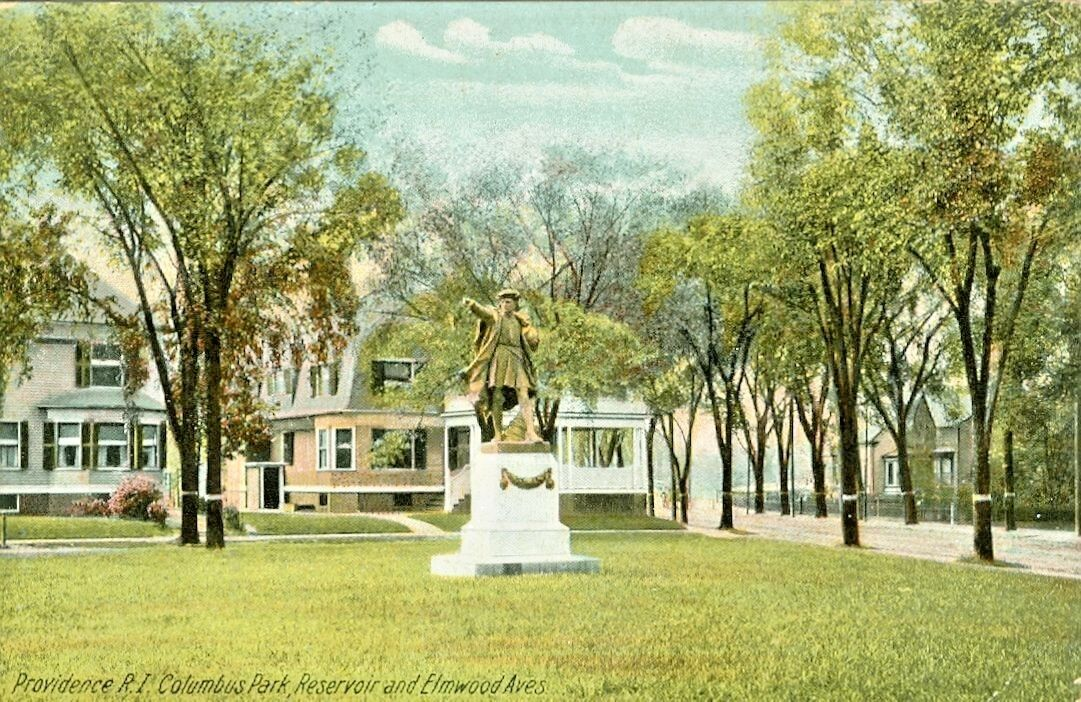
Columbus Square in Providence, ca 1920

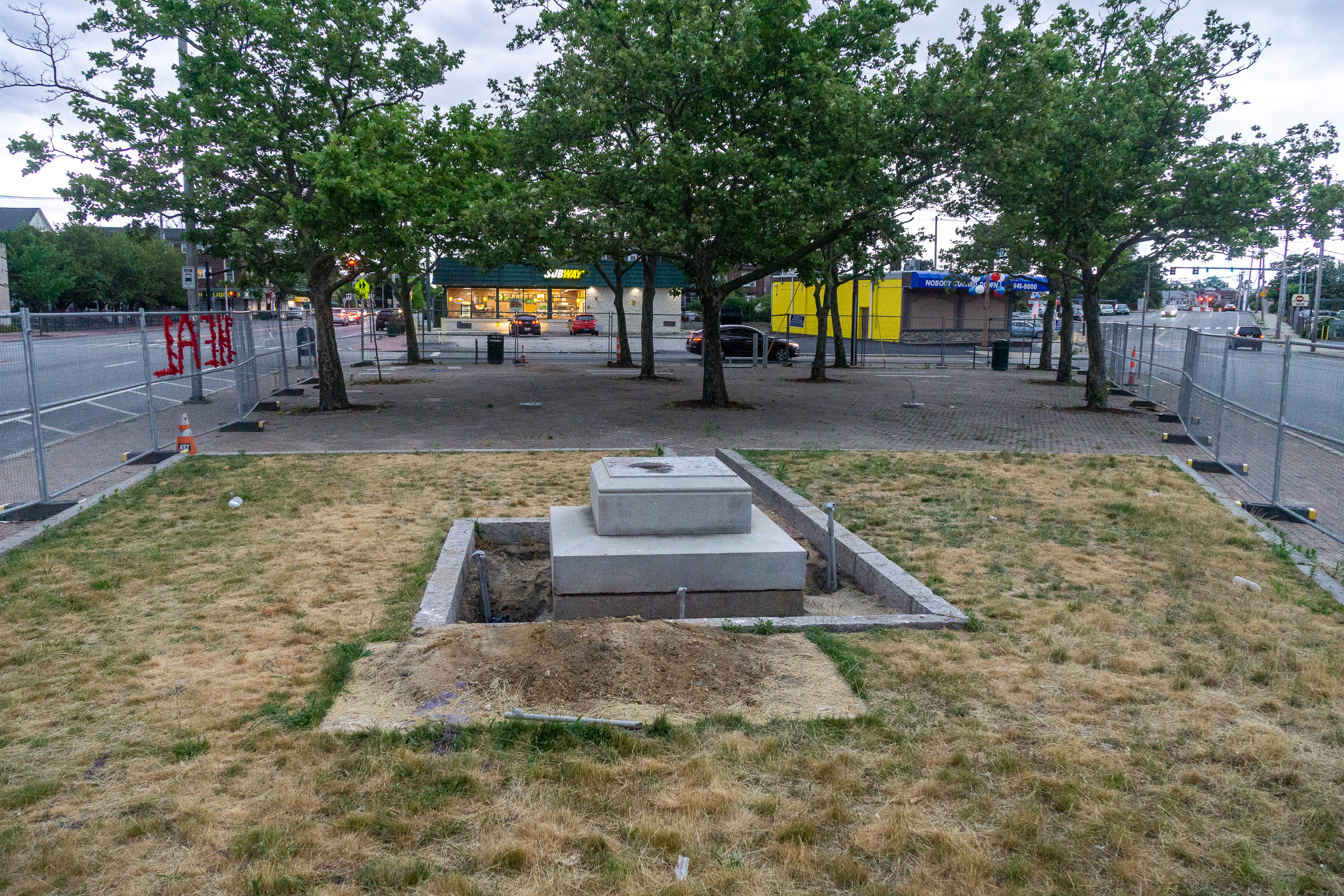
Columbus Square after removal in 2020

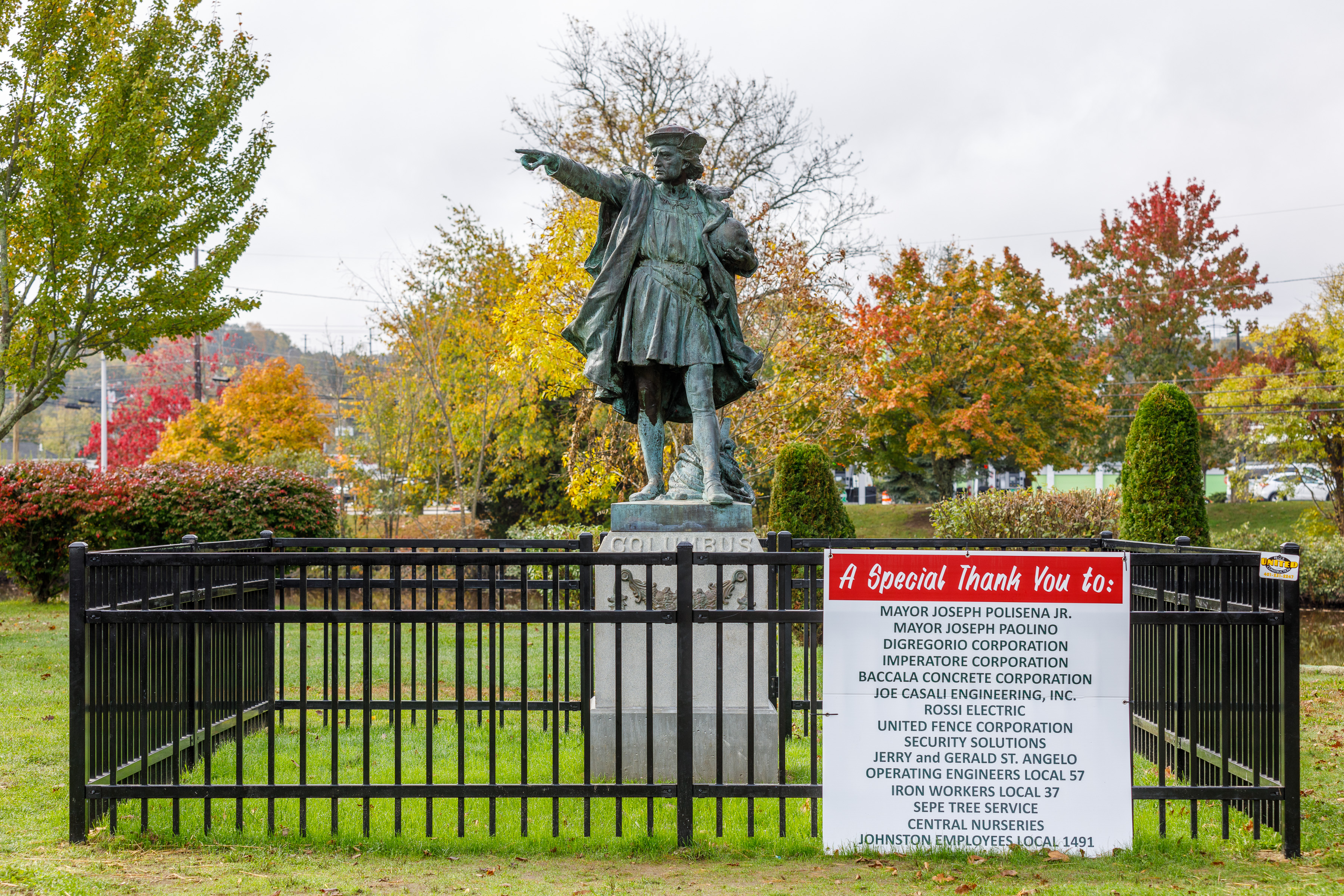
Relocated to Johnston in 2023

The statue was sometimes a focal point for Columbus Day ceremonies and speeches. One such event in 1939 was attended by the mayor, alderman, and council members.

In 2010, the statue was defaced on Columbus Day with red paint and a sign reading "murderer" hanging from its waist. The statue was again vandalized with paint in 2015 and 2017, raising questions in the media as to the appropriateness of honoring Columbus with a public statue.

In October 2019, the statue was splashed with red paint, and a sign reading "stop celebrating genocide" was leaned against the pedestal, again prompting local controversy. Providence councilwoman Katherine Kerwin of Ward 12 defended the actions on a local radio program hosted by RI WJAR anchor Gene Valicenti, prompting backlash and national news media attention. Mayor Jorge Elorza stated that he would consider moving the statue, though did not commit to where. Some of Rhode Island's Italian American community were pushing for a move from Elmwood to the Federal Hill neighborhood, which has historically been the center of Providence's Italian American community.

=== Relocation ===
In June 2020, on the order of mayor Jorge Elorza, the statue was removed from Columbus Square as the city had been dispatching police officers to watch the statue due to vandalism. The order was given during a time of statue removals across the United States in the wake of the George Floyd protests. During the removal, dozens of people from the neighborhood gathered to cheer. The city did not disclose where the statue would be stored, nor what its fate would be.

A special committee recommended in 2021 that the statue be removed permanently, appraised, and possibly offered for sale with the funds being devoted to amenities and beautification of Columbus Square/Reservoir Triangle. In 2023, Former Providence Mayor Joe Paolino purchased the statue for $50,000 and donated the statue to Johnston, Rhode Island. The statue was placed in Johnston Memorial Park, with the unveiling held on Columbus Day 2023.

== Design ==
The bronze cast depicts a 6.6 feet (2.0 m) high by 4.5 feet (1.4 m) wide and deep, "larger-than-life size" standing figure of Christopher Columbus atop a 5.25 feet (1.60 m) by 5.33 feet (1.62 m) plain square base of grey Westerly, Rhode Island granite. The National Historic Register of Places nomination describes the statue: "The explorer is caught in mid-stride, his left foot stepping off the base. In his left hand he holds a globe; his right arm is raised, his index finger pointing, as if giving an order or sighting land. Columbus wears a short tunic; a wide belt wraps the waist; a second belt across the hip holds a sword. A short full cloak billows out around the figure, and he wears a brimmed hat. There is a coil of line at his feet." The square base is inscribed with "Columbus" on the front, "1492" on the right side and "1893" on the left side.

At the time of the nomination, the statue was reported to be in good overall condition, but had some very small cracks in the figure and the tail ends of the bronze swag were missing. The base was also in good condition with only some chipping on the lower edge of the base being noted in the nomination.

== Importance ==
The National Register of Historic Places nomination lists the Columbus statue under both criteria A and C. Criterion A requires that the property must make a contribution to the major pattern of American history, and criterion C concerns the distinctive characteristics of its architecture and construction, including having great artistic value or being the work of a master. The basis for meeting criterion A is that the work is an example of the Gorham Manufacturing Company's large statue. Columbus was listed under criterion C as an example of Auguste Bartholdi's work. The statue has not been moved from its original location, but the "significance of the work is not dependent upon its setting but is encompassed within the object itself." Columbus was added to the National Register of Historic Places on October 19, 2001.

Though it is a bronze cast copy of the original silver work, the sculpture itself was declared a masterpiece because "[l]ife and vigor are implied in every line and feature, and the general effect is one of great beauty." In relation to the original silver cast, James Wilson Pierce declared it as an exemplary work of art that surpasses all other Christopher Columbus sculptures in the United States.

== See also ==
- List of monuments and memorials to Christopher Columbus
- National Register of Historic Places listings in Providence, Rhode Island
