= South Side, Providence, Rhode Island =

Coordinates: 41.804°N 71.424°W

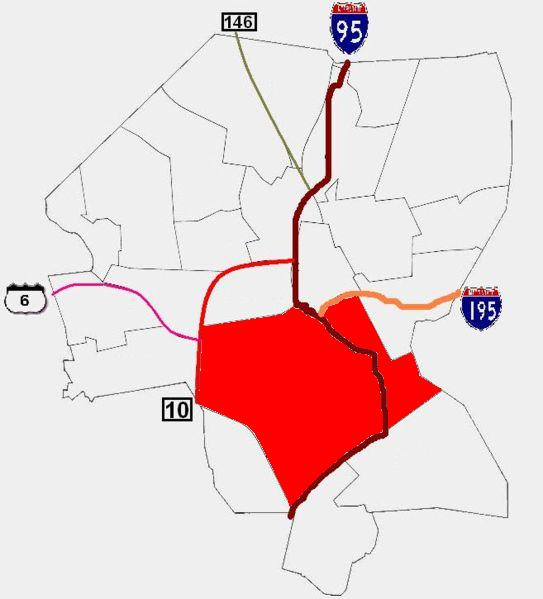
Providence neighborhoods with South Side in red

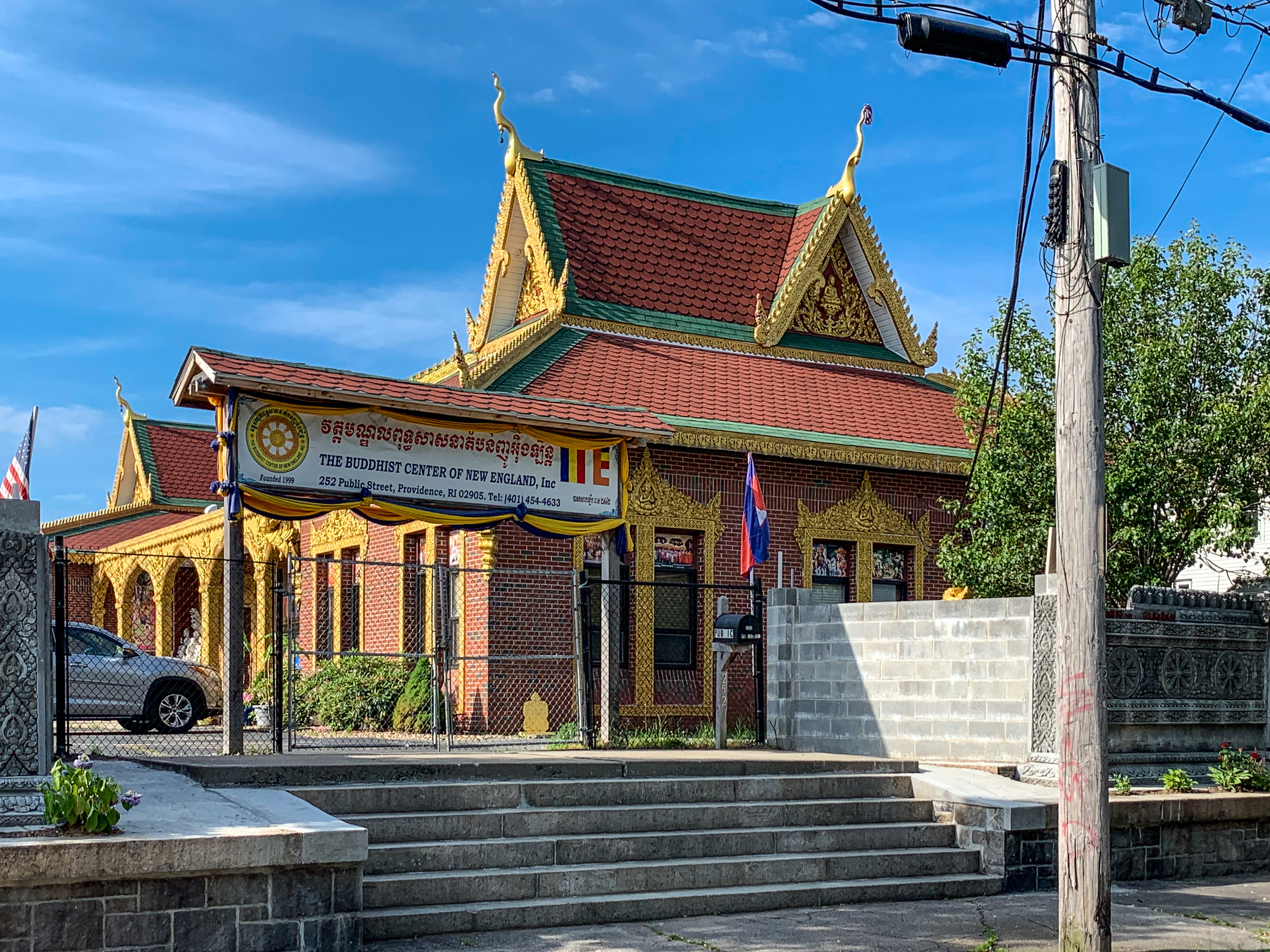
The Buddhist Center of New England, Public Street

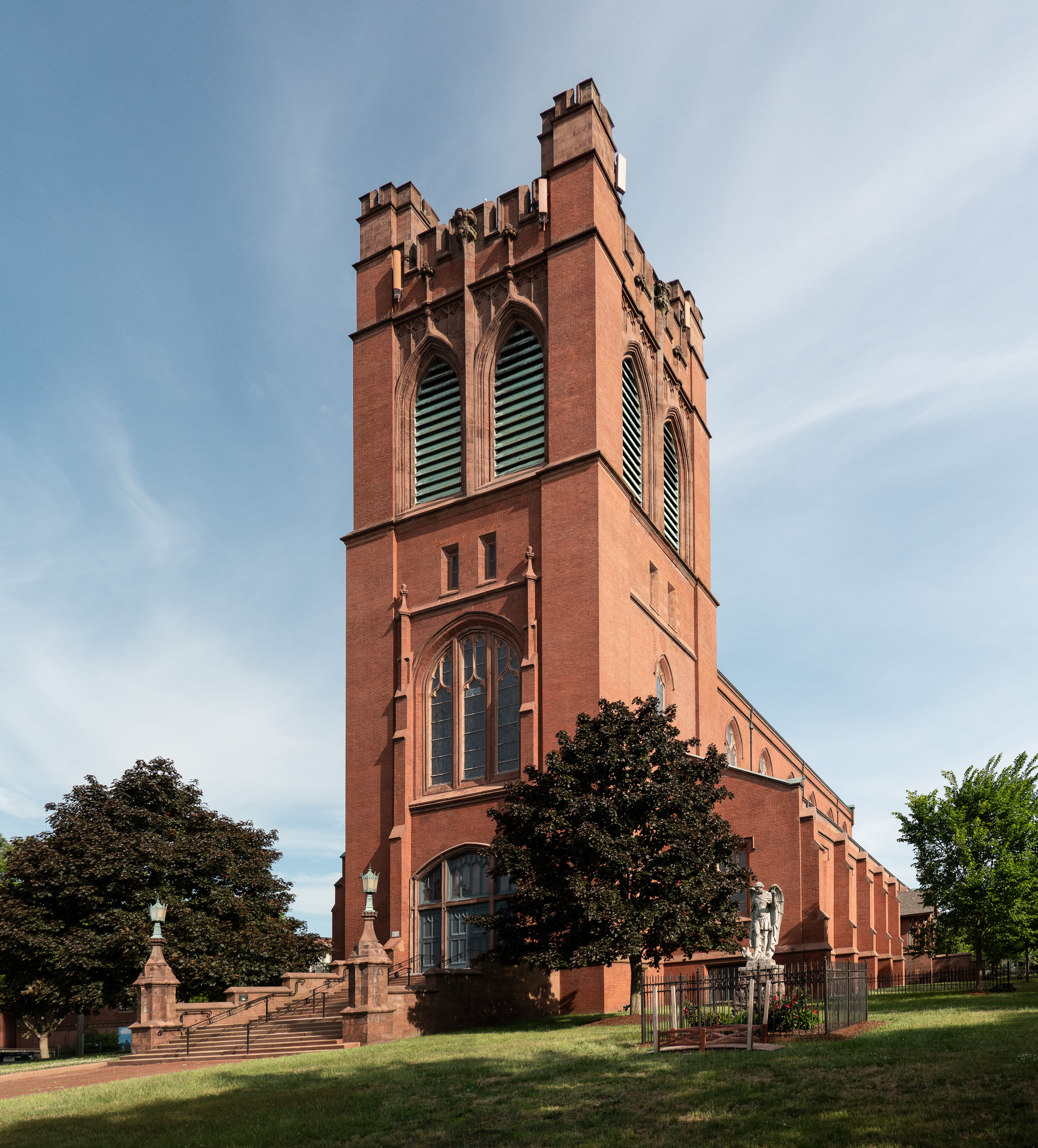
Church of Saint Michael the Archangel, 251 Oxford Street

The South Side of Providence, Rhode Island, originally South Providence, is a term frequently used to describe the collective region comprising the official neighborhoods of Upper and Lower South Providence, Elmwood and the West End. The name was first used in the 1830s when the New York, Providence and Boston Railroad established its first station at a pier on the Providence River on a point of land about one half mile south of downtown Providence. The station was named South Providence.

Hispanics comprise the majority of the population, with over half its residents claiming Hispanic ancestry, as compared to thirty percent of Providence residents as a whole. Consequently, it has a high percentage (64%) of children enrolled in public school whose first language is not English, with the most commonly spoken language being Spanish.

The area continues to struggle with poverty issues; the South Side's median family income is $23,379 as compared with $32,058 for the city as a whole, and more than one out of three families lives in poverty.

== History ==
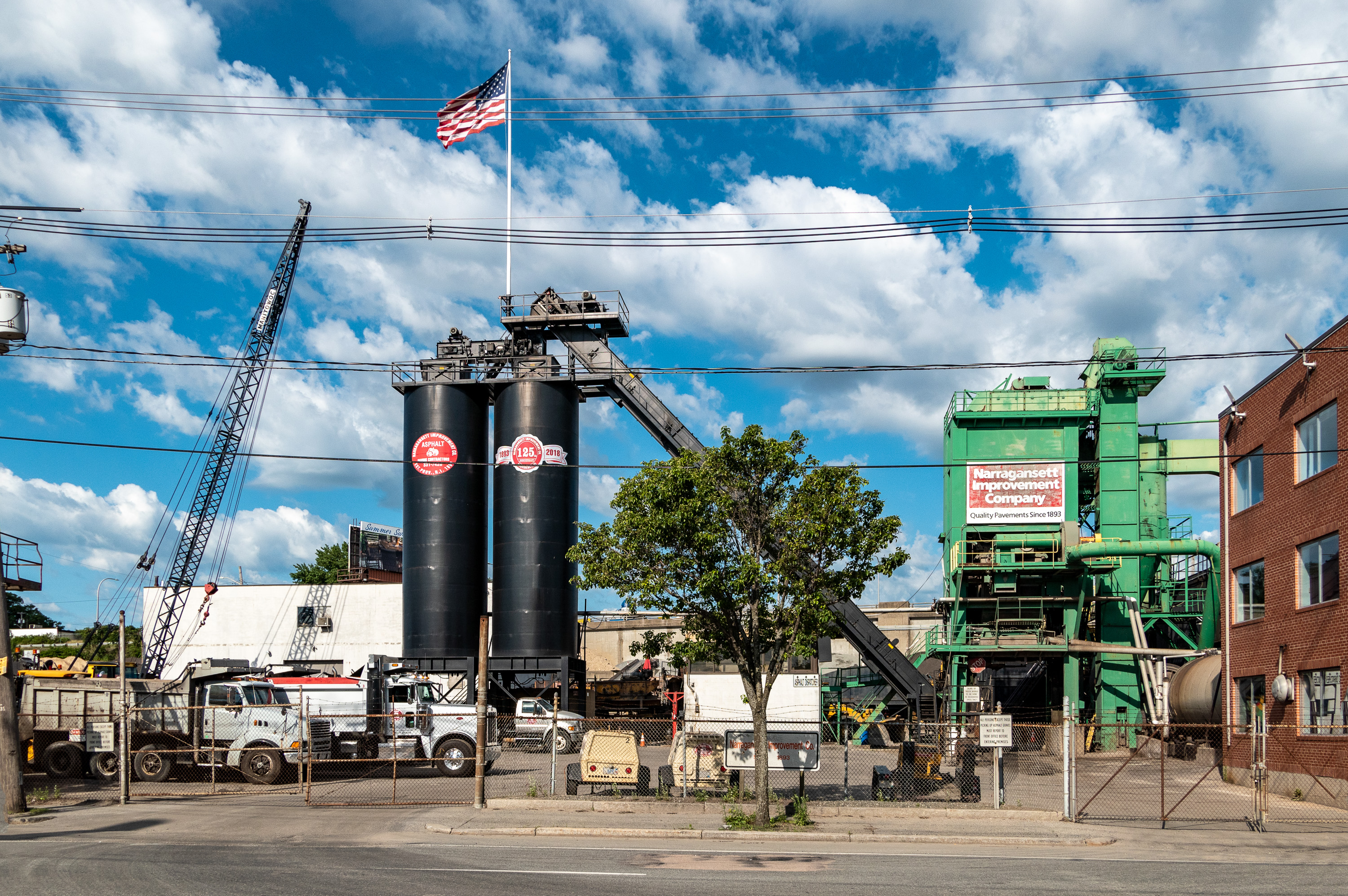
Allens Avenue has been an industrial corridor since the start of the 20th century

The South Providence neighborhood developed with a wide mix of uses, including residential, institutional, industrial, and commercial uses. An exception is Allens Avenue, which has been exclusively industrial since the start of the 20th century.

The Pine/Friendship street area, in the northern section of South Providence, was the camping ground for Rochambeau's troops in June 1781, prior to the start of their march to Yorktown. 1832 saw the beginning of middle and upper-class residential development here. By the late 19th century, many impressive Greek Revival, Italianate, Queen Anne, and Second Empire homes were built; many of these have since been demolished. The area was home to wealthy textile and jewelry magnates, including the president of the Gorham Manufacturing Company.

By the early 20th century, transit improvements encouraged the more affluent residents to move to the outer ring of the city.

In 1868, most of the area was reannexed by Providence from Cranston. For the next 90 years, the area was predominantly Irish Catholic, with a significant Jewish minority. Many Roman Catholic churches remain in the area today.

The decades following World War II saw an exodus of white residents moving to the suburbs, and starting in the 1960s, local black families moved into the neighborhood. Starting in 1980, the area saw an influx of Hispanics, along with Native Americans, Africans, Laotians, and Vietnamese Hmong.

== Demographics ==
As of August 2005, 52.3% of South Side residents were Hispanic, 24.4% were African-American, 12.2% were non-Hispanic white, 9.1% were Asian, and 2% were Native American. 64% of public school children under the age of six spoke a language other than English as their primary language.

The median family income was $23,379, which was 75% of the citywide average. 35.5% of families lived below the poverty line. 30.3% of families received some form of public assistance.

Nearly one in four children had been exposed to unsafe quantities of lead. This is generally attributed to the prevalence of lead paint in older homes, though older plumbing may also be a factor.

== Hospitals ==
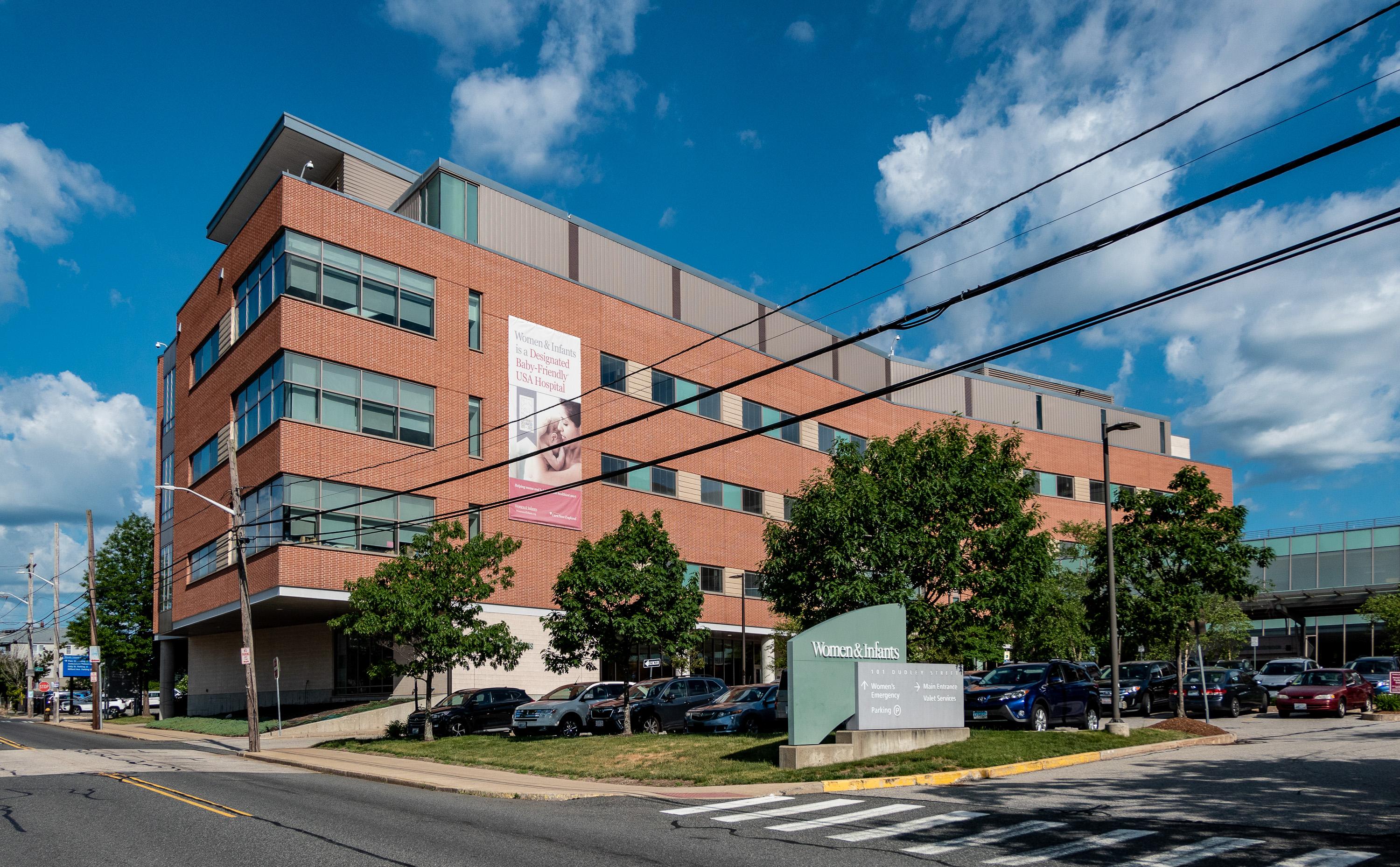
Women & Infants Hospital

The South Side includes a line of four hospitals that from west to east are: St Joseph's Hospital for Specialty Care, Rhode Island Hospital, Women & Infants Hospital of Rhode Island, and Hasbro Children's Hospital.

St Joseph's Hospital for Specialty Care is a Catholic hospital located at 21 Peace Street in the northern portion of Elmwood.

Rhode Island Hospital, Women & Infants Hospital of Rhode Island, and Hasbro Children's Hospital are located in close proximity to one another in Upper South Providence. Rhode Island Hospital has 719 beds and an acute care hospital and an academic center affiliated with Alpert Medical School.
