= Upper South Providence, Providence, Rhode Island =

Coordinates: 41.8122°N 71.4091°W

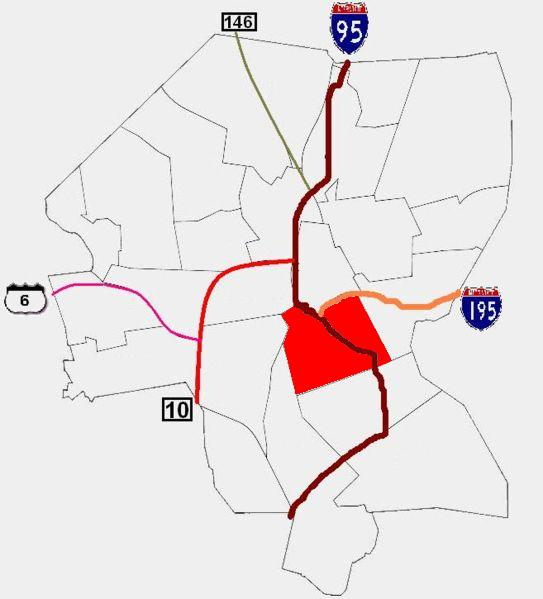
Providence neighborhoods with Upper South Providence in red

Upper South Providence is an official neighborhood in the South Side in the city of Providence, Rhode Island. It is bound to the north by Interstate 95, the east by the Providence River, to the south by Public Street, and the west by Broad Street. Often associated with Lower South Providence directly to its south, Upper South Providence is a distinct neighborhood.

== History ==
Between 1754-1868, the area that is today Upper South Providence was part of the city of Cranston, Rhode Island. The Pine/Friendship street area, in the northern section of South Providence, was the camping ground for Rochambeau's troops in June 1781, prior to the start of their march to Yorktown.

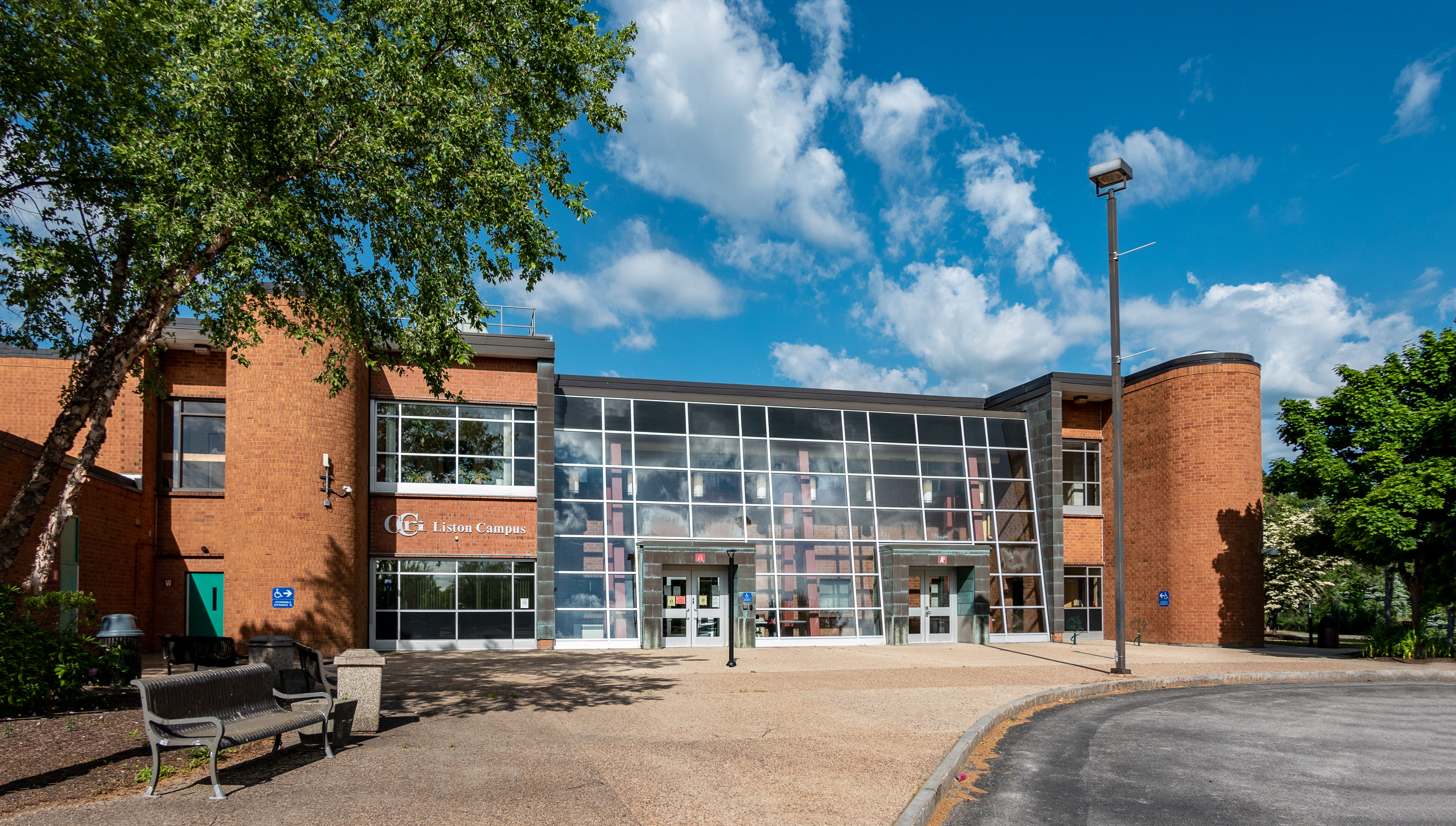
The Liston campus of Community College of Rhode Island was established in Upper South Providence in 1990

1832 saw the beginning of middle and upper-class residential development. By the late 19th century, many impressive Greek Revival, Italianate, Queen Anne, and Second Empire homes were built; many of these have since been demolished. The area was home to wealthy textile and jewelry magnates, including the president of the Gorham Manufacturing Company. In 1868, most of the area was reannexed by Providence from Cranston.

By the early 20th century, transit improvements encouraged the more affluent residents to move to the outer ring of the city. For the next 90 years, the area was predominantly Irish Catholic, with a significant Jewish minority. The area became known as Dogtown from about the turn of the century. Many Roman Catholic churches remain in the area today.

== Government ==
At the municipal level, all of Upper South Providence falls within Ward 11. This ward is represented in the Providence City Council by Mary Kay Harris, a Democrat.

== Demographics ==
As of March 2007, 41.2% of residents in Upper South Providence were Hispanic, 34% were Black or African-American, 28.7% were White (18.8% Non-Hispanic White), 2.6% were Asian or Pacific Islander, and 2.6% were Native American.

Nearly half of all public school children under the age of six speak a language other than English as their primary language. This is slightly below the citywide average of 54%.

The Upper South Side continues to struggle with entrenched poverty. The median family income was $24,656 as of March 2007, well below the citywide average of $32,058. As of the year 2000 census, the area's unemployment rate at 17% was the highest in the city, with 27% unemployment in the Upper South Side's largest block. 36.4% of families live below the poverty line while 16% rely on some form of public assistance. One in four children in this neighborhood under the age of six have been exposed to high amounts of lead, primarily from lead paint in older homes.

== Parks and Greenspaces ==
Unlike other neighborhoods in Providence, Upper South Providence does not include many parks or green spaces. The largest green space in Upper South Providence is the Davey Lopes Recreation Center at the corner of Dudley Street and Prairie Avenue. Smaller parks include the Dudley Street Gateway and the Pearl Street Park. Peace & Plenty Park is located at 98 Peace Street, in nearby Elmwood. This 10,000 sq ft. playground is one of the few playgrounds in the South Side of Providence.

== Hospitals ==
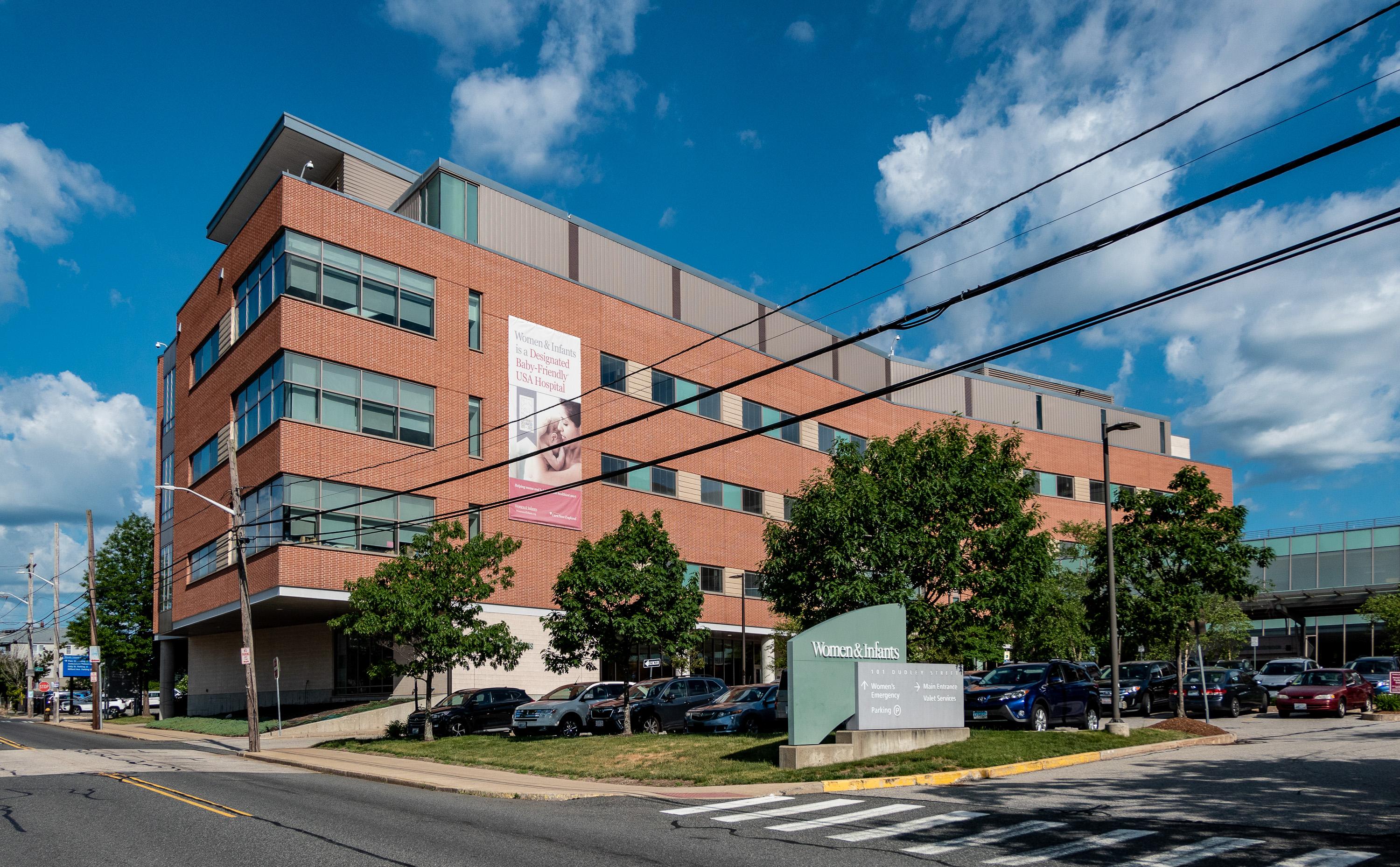
Women & Infants Hospital of Rhode Island

Rhode Island Hospital, Women & Infants Hospital of Rhode Island, and Hasbro Children's Hospital are located in close proximity to one another in Upper South Providence. Rhode Island Hospital has 719 beds and an acute care hospital and an academic center affiliated with Brown University's School of Medicine.
