= Lower South Providence, Providence, Rhode Island =

Coordinates: 41.802°N 71.409°W

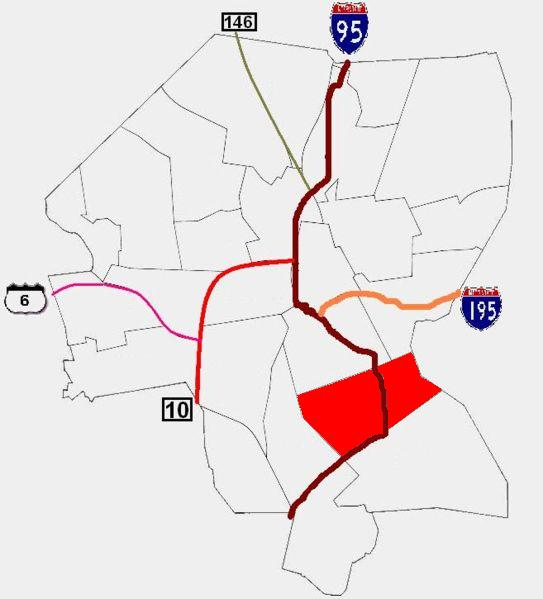
Providence neighborhood with Lower South Providence in red

The Lower South Side (or Lower South Providence) is a neighborhood in the southern part of Providence, Rhode Island. It is bounded by Public Street to the north (bordering Upper South Providence), by Interstate 95 to the south (bordering Washington Park), by Broad Street to the west (bordering Elmwood), and by the Providence River to the east.

Lower South Providence

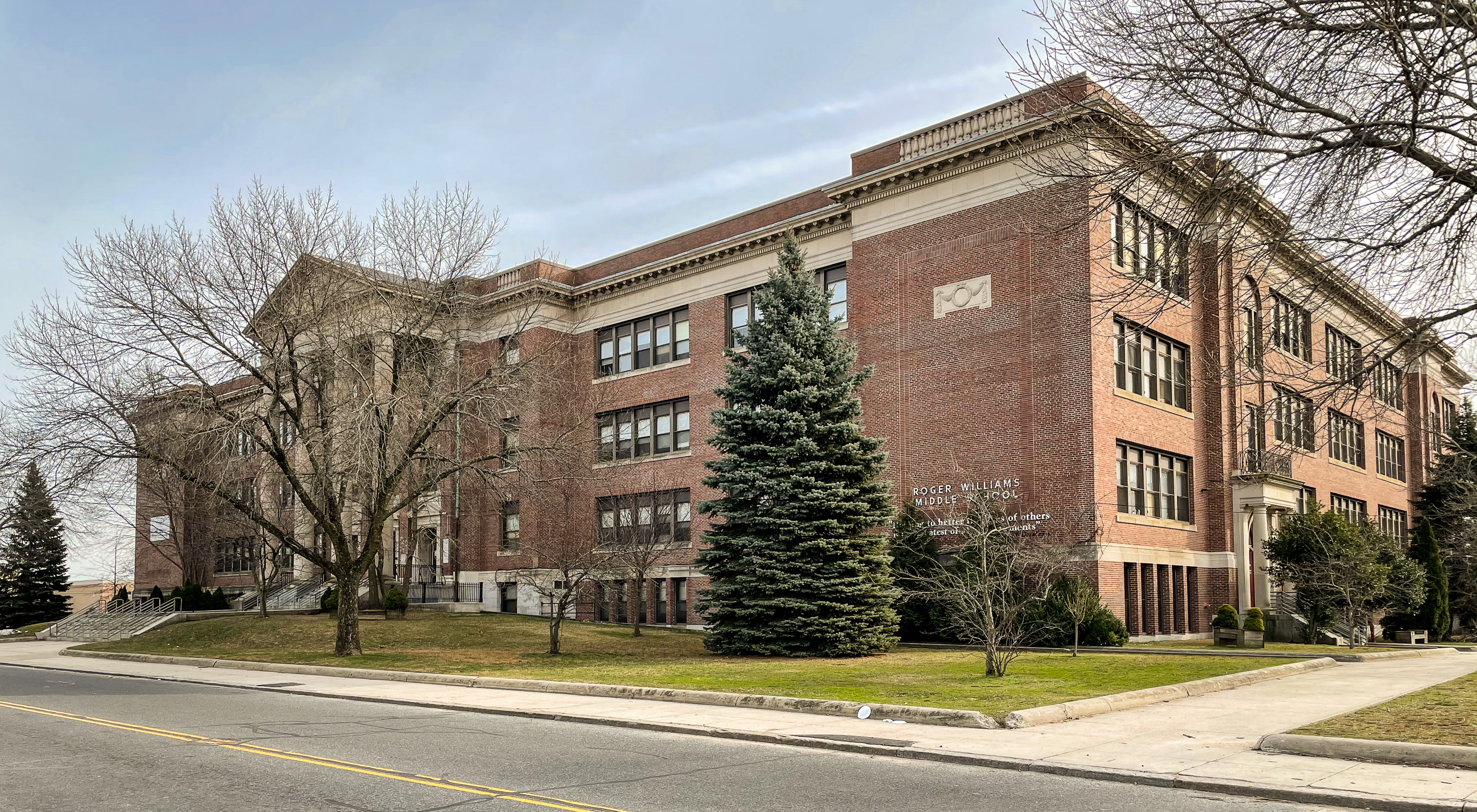
Roger Williams Middle School, Thurbers Avenue

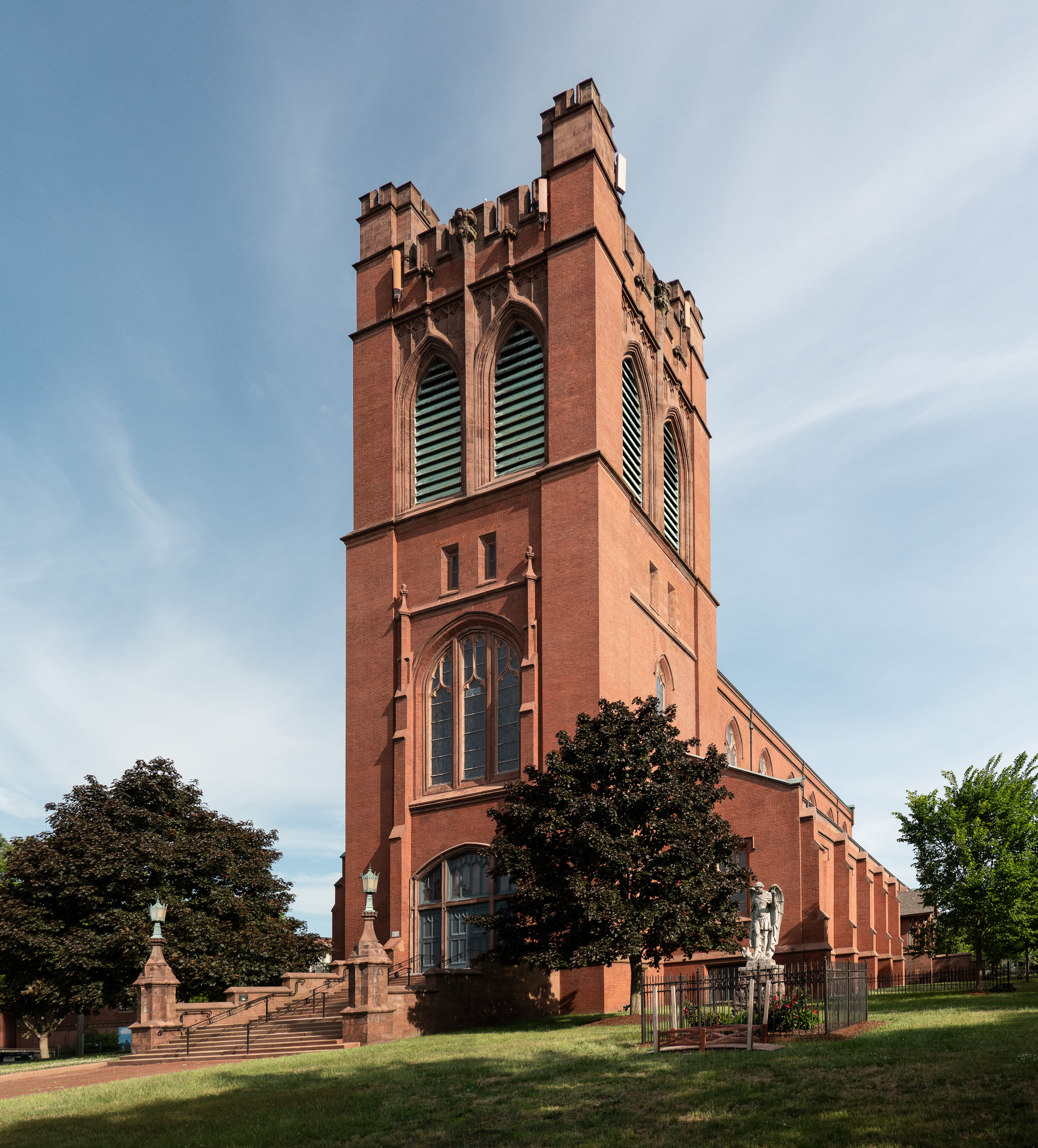
Church of Saint Michael the Archangel

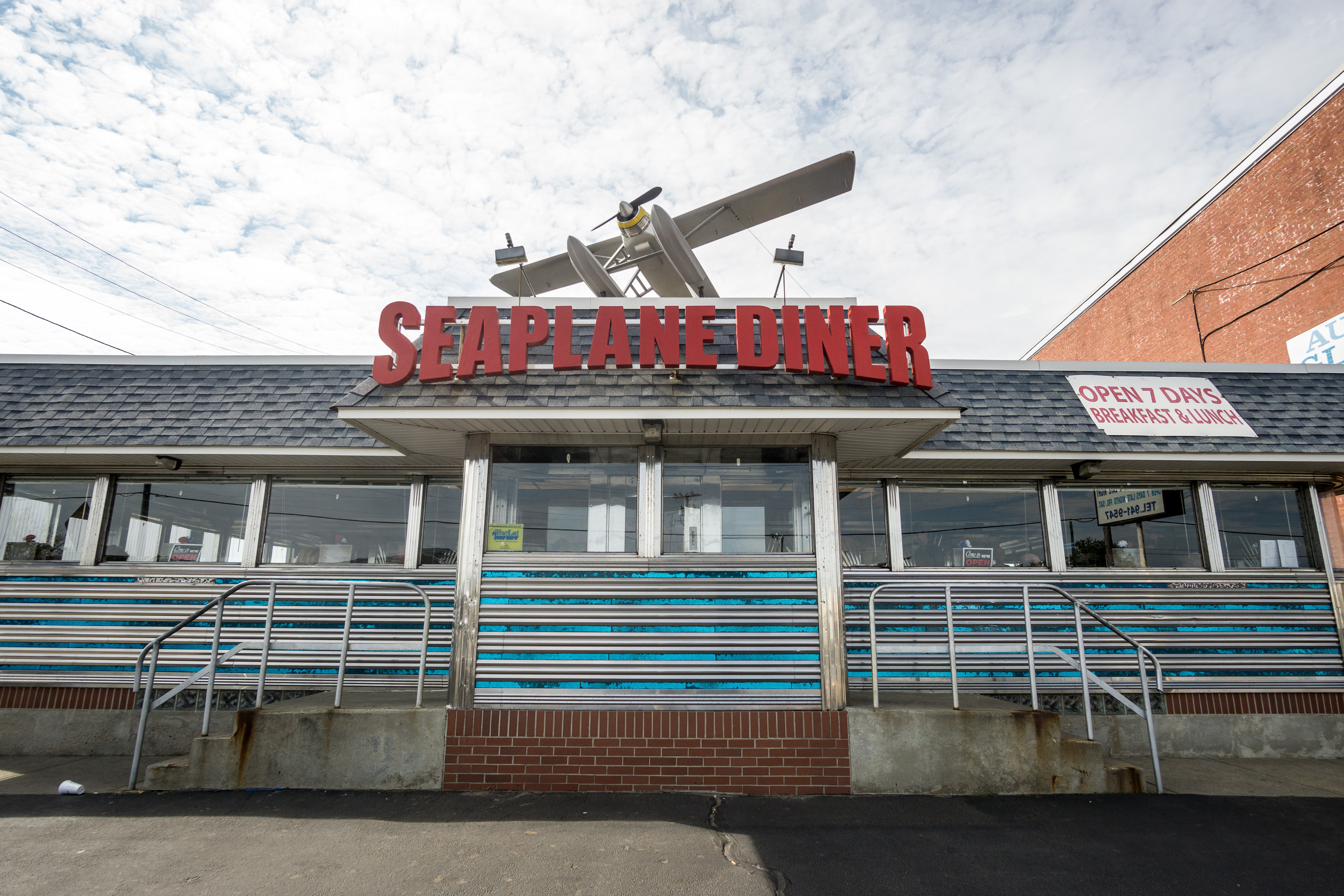
Seaplane Diner, Allens Avenue

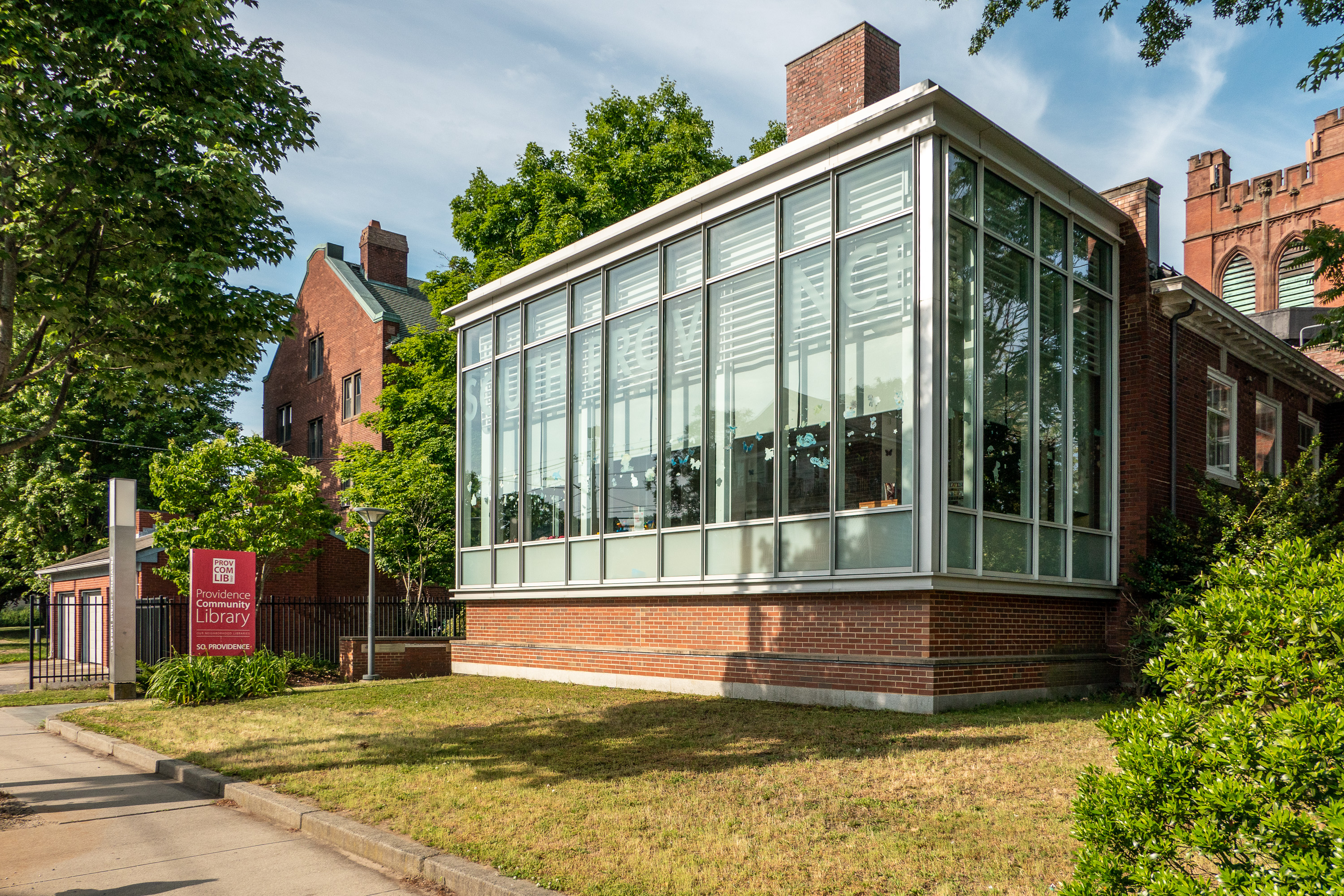
South Providence Library, Prairie Avenue

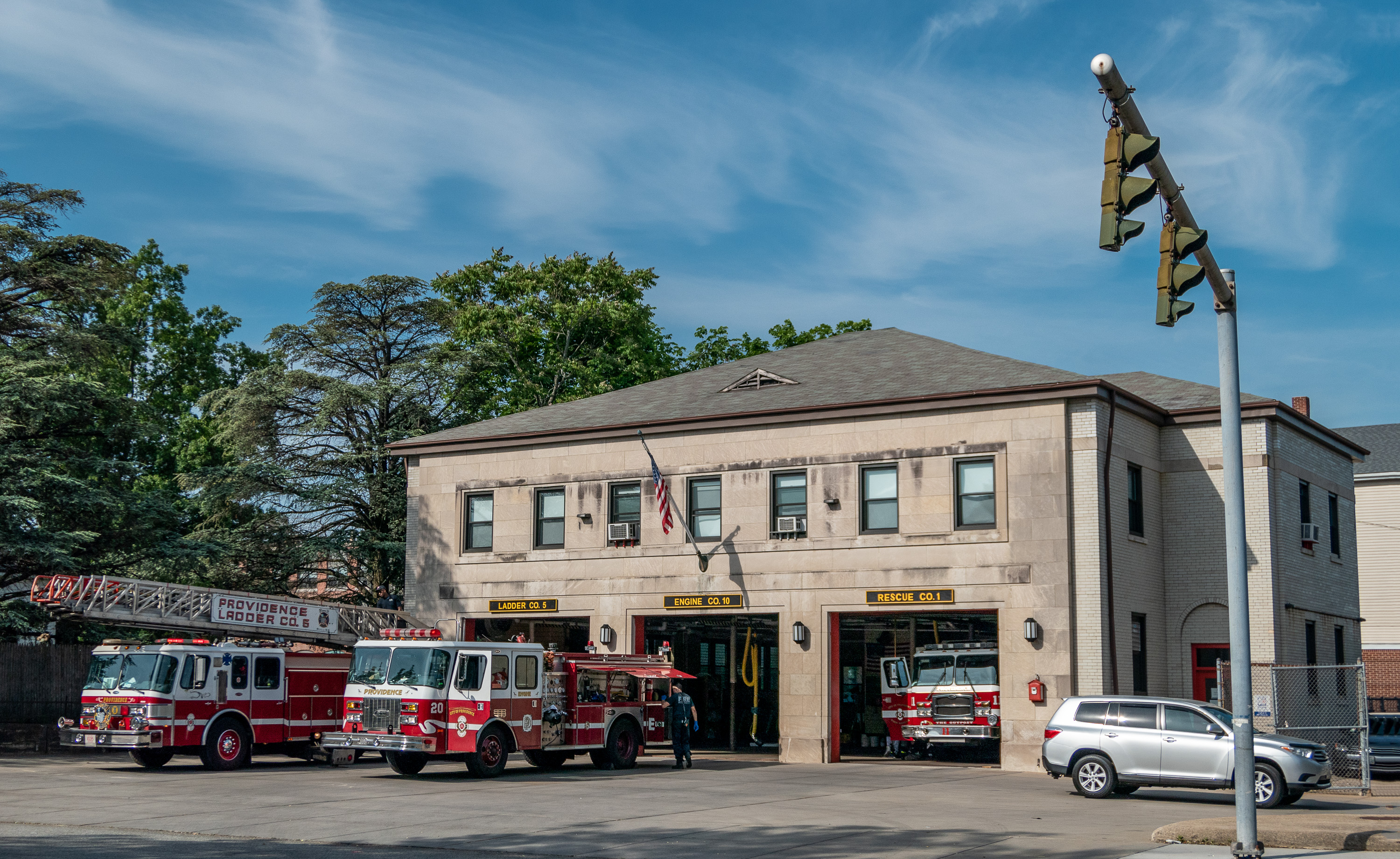
Fire Station

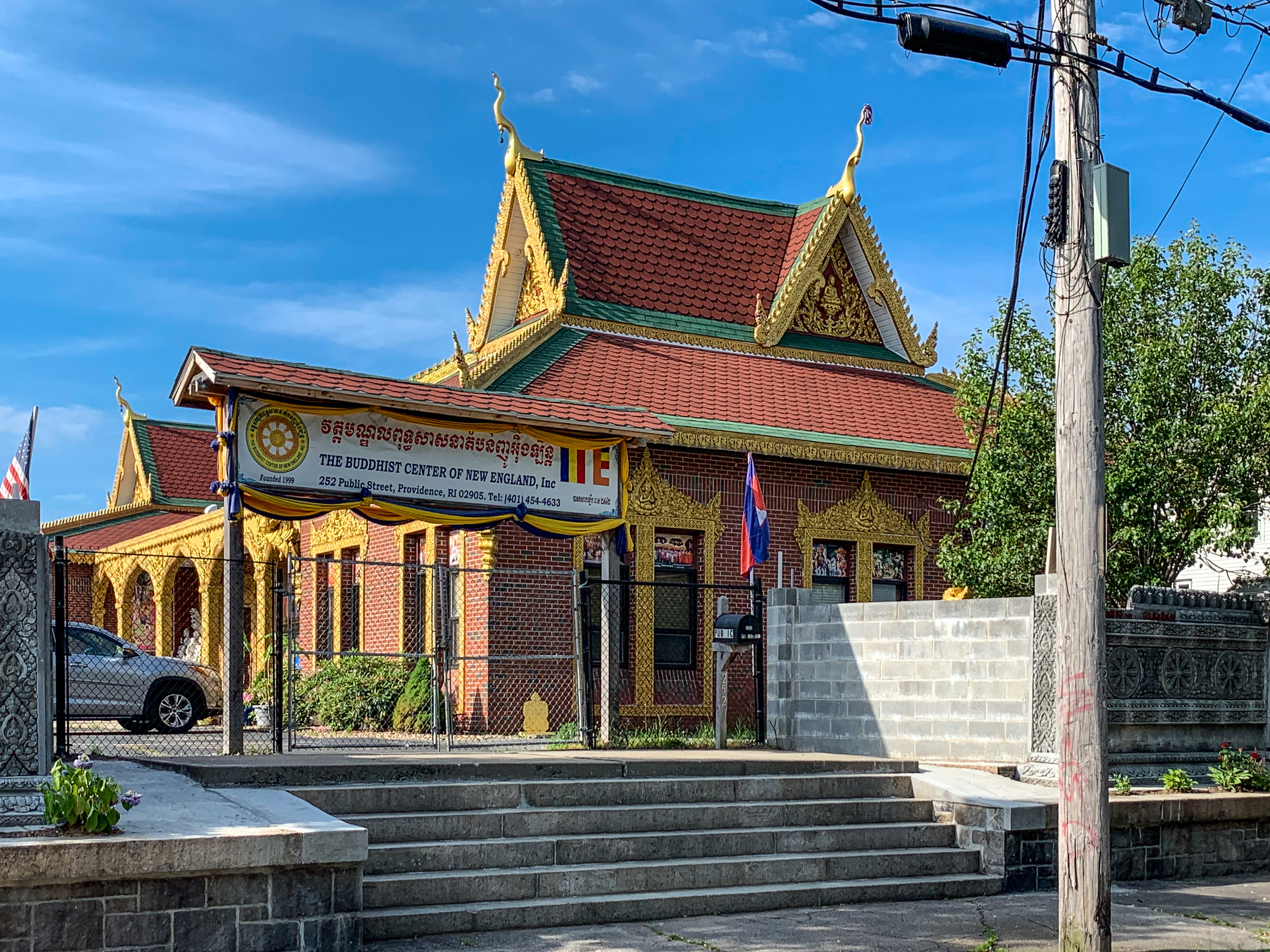
Buddhist Center of New England, Public Street

== History ==
The area that is now Lower South Providence was originally pasture land. The area was ceded to the new town of Cranston, in 1754 and did not rejoin Providence until 1868. A streetcar was added in 1865 which ran west along Public Street and then south down Ocean Street; it transformed the Lower South Side into Providence's first streetcar suburb. In the next ten years, the streets developed quickly wherever the streetcar ran.

Irish immigrants had lived primarily farther north, but they began to populate the southern part of Lower Providence between 1860 and 1880 as the population of Providence doubled to nearly 105,000. Cranston ceded the Lower South Side (along with Washington Park) back to Providence in 1868.

The Upper South Side attracted industry due to its proximity to downtown, while the Lower South Side had greater access to Narragansett Bay and freight lines via the Port of Providence; metal and jewelry factories, consequently, began to appear. By the 1870s, the majority of housing became duplexes rented by working class tenants. By 1900, the creation of new electrified rail lines gave the area fast transportation and ample affordable housing, and the Lower South Side thrived. Between 1900 and 1950, descendants of the previous-generation immigrants moved into newer, more affluent areas, with the increased prosperity that they had attained.

After 1950, the automobile sentenced the area to a long inexorable decline. The creation of Interstate 95 under the Eisenhower Interstate System required demolition of existing buildings and severed the region's historical connection to the waterfront. Green space was lost as lots and yards were converted into driveways and garages. Street renovation resulted in the loss of tree-lined streetscapes. Residents began to look farther out for newer, more prosperous neighborhoods.

== Government ==
At the municipal level, almost all of Lower South Providence is within Ward 10, though the very northwestern area of the neighborhood north of Reynolds Avenue/Saratoga Street, between Prairie Avenue and Broad Street, falls within Ward 11. Council President Luis Aponte and Mary Kay Harris represent Wards 10 and 11, respectively, in the Providence City Council. Both are Democrats.
