= Columbus Square (Providence) =

Historic public square in Rhode Island, United States

Coordinates: 41.8179°N 71.4064°W

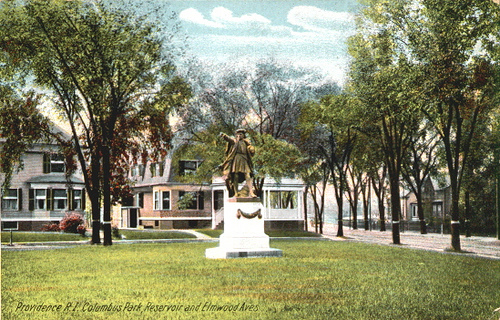
Historic Postcard of Columbus Square at Elmwood and Reservoir Avenues, looking south

Columbus Square is a historic public square in the Historic Elmwood Neighborhood of Providence, Rhode Island. Located at the intersection of Elmwood Avenue and Reservoir Avenue, it serves as a gateway to Elmwood from the Reservoir and West End Neighborhoods.

== Description ==
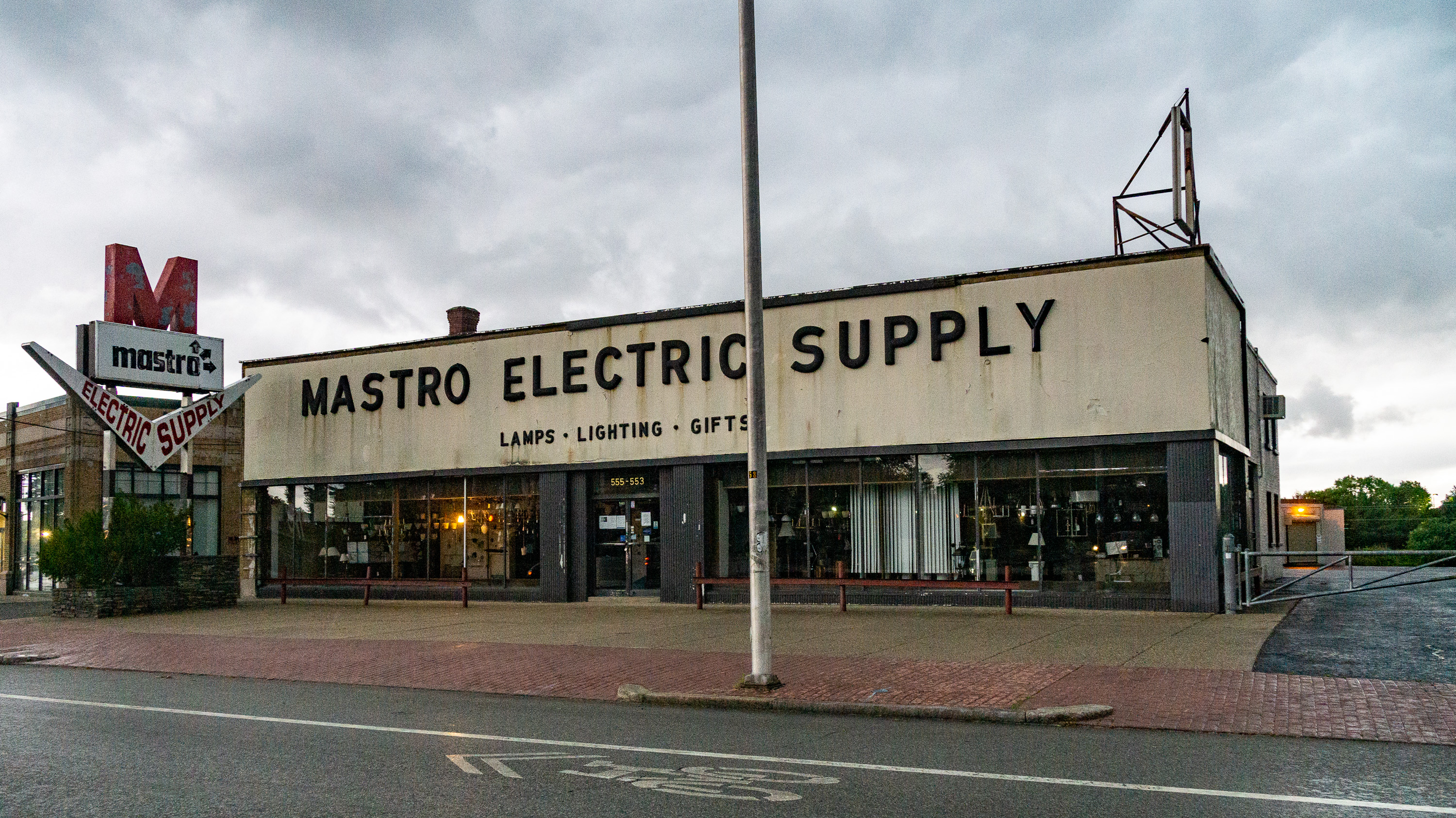
Mastro Electric Supply has been a Columbus Square fixture since 1946

Columbus Square is the heart of the Elmwood Avenue business district that abuts the South Elmwood Historic District. After June 2020, the location consists of a fenced triangle of land, half paved-over with brick, with about a dozen trees and a square granite slab where the Columbus statue once stood. It is also home to nearby charter school, Paul Cuffee Upper School independent middle school Sophia Academy, several car dealers, a drug store, a sandwich shop, and an electrical supply company.

== History ==
The small triangular plot of land was originally owned by Joseph Cooke, who deeded to the Town of Cranston on May 24, 1824. Cranston in turn deeded it to Providence in 1868. It was renamed Columbus Park in 1893 in honor of a bronze statue of Columbus which was erected in on the small plot on the occasion of the 400th anniversary of Columbus's landing.

=== Columbus Statue ===
Columbus square was notable for its bronze statue, Columbus, designed by French sculptor Frédéric Auguste Bartholdi and cast in bronze in 1893 by the historic Gorham Manufacturing Company, which was located nearby on Adelaide Avenue. The statue, of Christopher Columbus, is a recasting of a statue prepared in sterling silver by the Gorham company for the Columbian World's Fair in Chicago, 1893. The statue is listed on the National Register of Historic Places and is sited in Columbus Square Park, a public park of the City of Providence Parks Department.

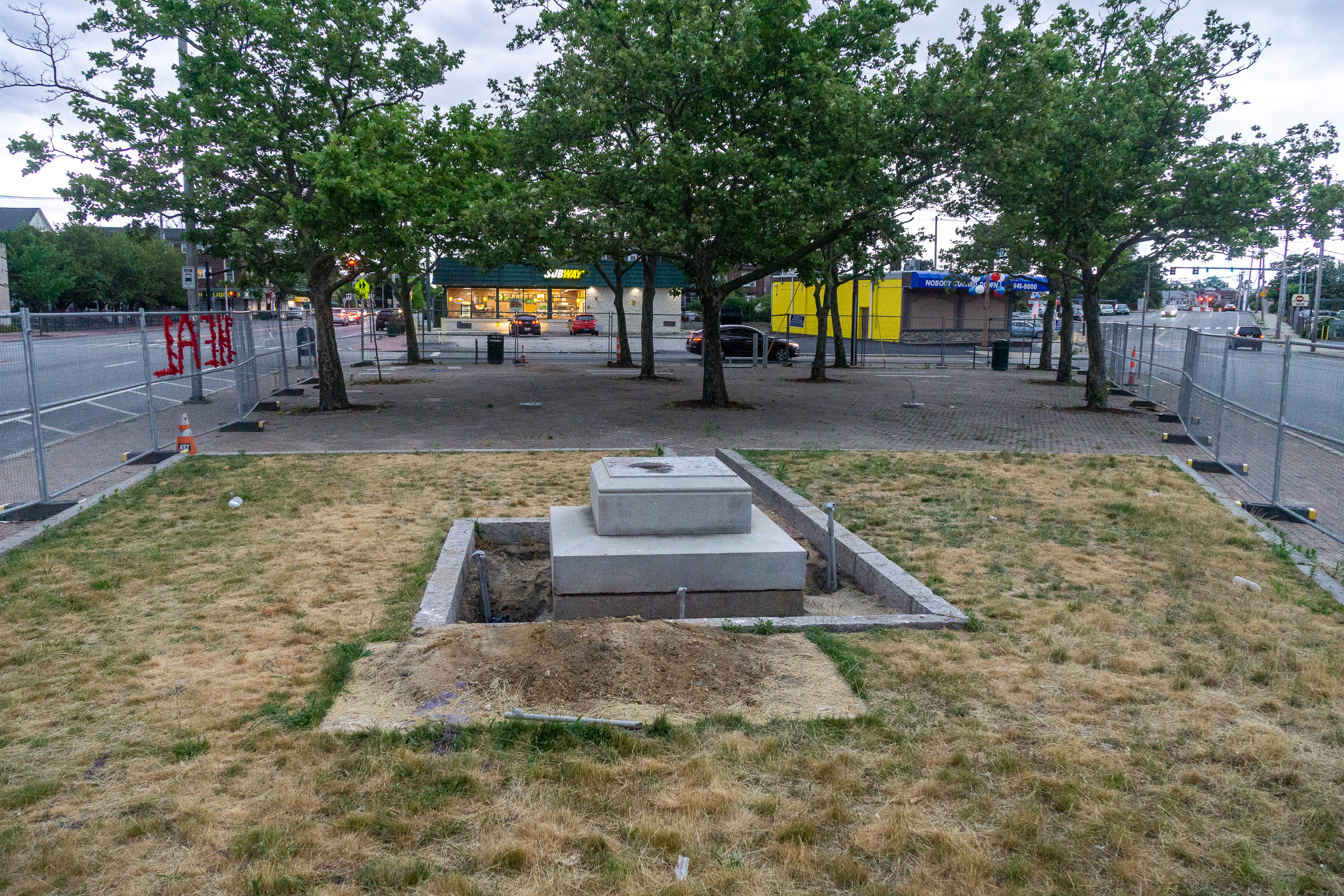
Columbus Square after statue removal, June 28, 2020.

In June 2020, on the order of mayor Jorge Elorza, the Columbus statue was removed from Columbus Square as the city had been dispatching police officers to watch the statue due to vandalism. The order was given during a time of statue removals across the United States in the wake of George Floyd protests. During the removal, dozens of people from the neighborhood gathered to cheer. The statue was purchased by a former Providence mayor Joseph R. Paolino Jr. and gifted to Johnston, Rhode Island where it is displayed at a park.

== Providence Commemoration Lab ==
In 2024 Columbus Square was determined as one of three sites in Providence to be addressed by the Providence Commemoration Lab, funded by the Mellon Foundation and the American Rescue Plan, commissioning temporary artistic projects to launch in 2025. The Lab invites unexpected ways of understanding commemoration as a communal process of historical redress.

== See also ==
- Neighborhoods in Providence
- Elmwood Neighborhood
