= Elmwood, Providence, Rhode Island =

- Elmwood Historic District
- U.S. National Register of Historic Places
- U.S. Historic district
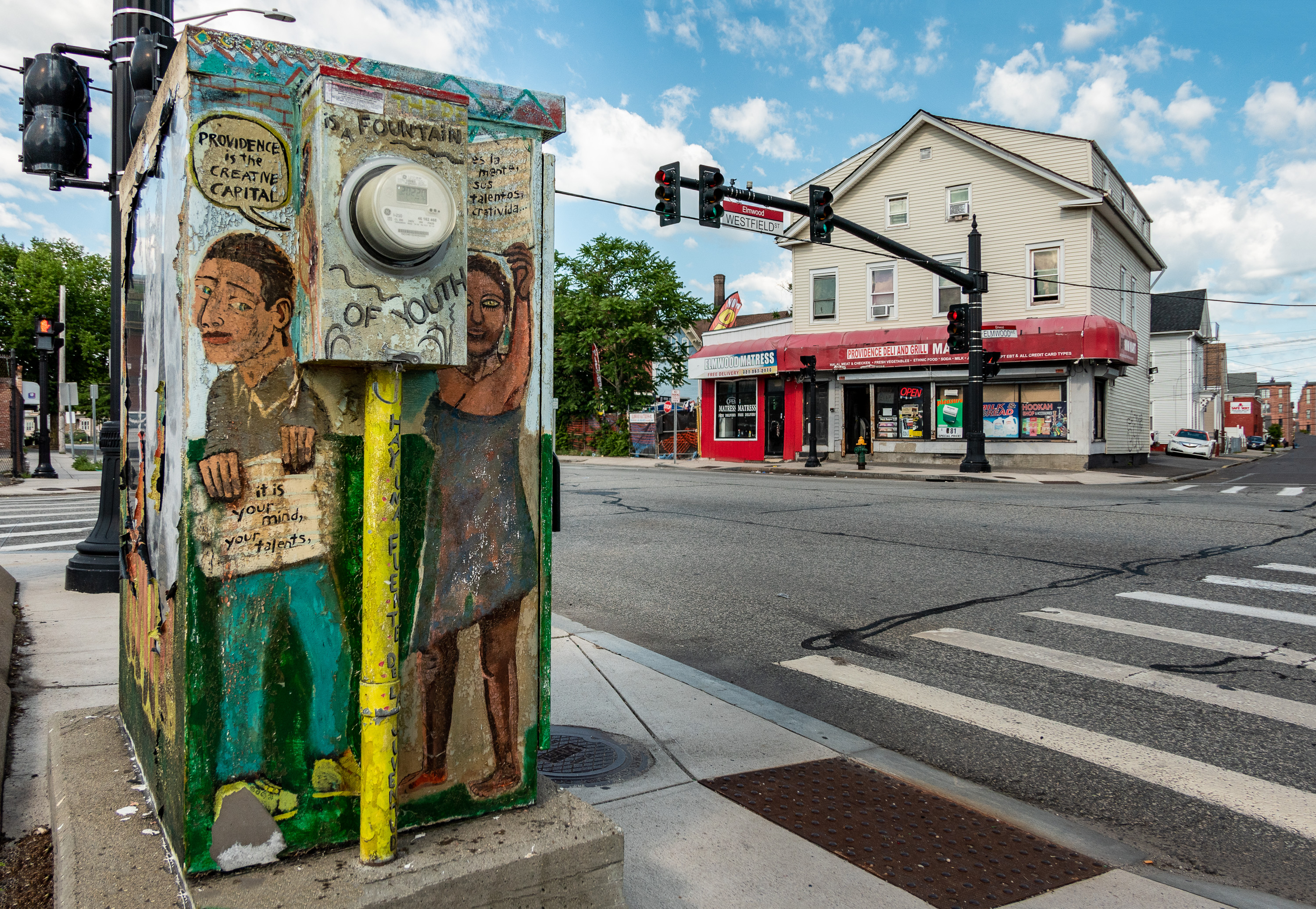
- Location: Providence, Rhode Island
- Coordinates: 41.8°N 71.42°W
- Built: 1875
- Architect: Multiple
- Architectural style: Late 19th And 20th Century Revivals, Late Victorian
- MPS: Elmwood MRA
- NRHP reference No.: 80004603
- Added to NRHP: January 7, 1980

Elmwood is a neighborhood in the South Side of Providence, Rhode Island. The triangular region is demarcated by Broad Street, Elmwood Avenue, and Interstate 95.

== History ==
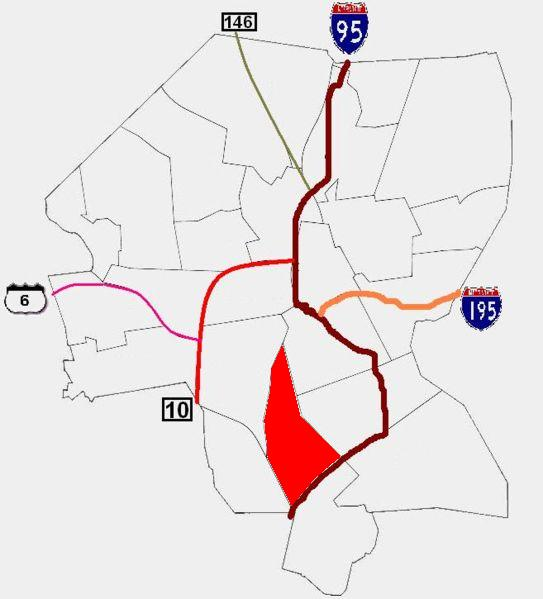
Providence neighborhoods with Elmwood in red

Prior to the 1850s, the region had been used primarily as farm land. In the late 18th and early 19th centuries, as the city began to expand south and west with the development of manufacturing and shipping interests, the area began to develop. In the 1840s through 1860s, as the city of Providence expanded from a population of 23,000 to past 50,000, development crept southwestward along Broad Street. As areas began to be densely populated, the remaining farms were subdivided.

The neighborhood takes its name from one of its principal developers, Joseph J. Cooke, who in 1843 purchased a large tract of farm land and named the estate "Elmwood". He and other developers sought to build a model suburban community with wide streets and shade-giving elm trees.

As public transportation improved from omnibuses (horse-drawn carriages) to horse-drawn tracked cars, and finally to electrified streetcars, development began to quicken pace. A number of manufacturers moved to Elmwood, while the area near Public St, Elmwood Ave, and Potters Ave began to develop as a middle to upper class residential neighborhood.

As the automobile came to increase in popularity, businesses in the form of car dealerships, garages, and service stations would proliferate along Elmwood Avenue. As the trolley service was bustituted, Elmwood Ave was widened significantly and the elm trees Cooke planted had to be removed. These changes in streetscape changed the character of the neighborhood.

When the 1950s came, Interstate 95 was constructed, and many single-family homes were converted into apartments. Combined with the aging housing stock and traffic congestion, the neighborhood became less appealing to the middle-class, who left in large numbers during this time. By the early and mid 1970s, spot demolition on dilapidated houses became common and Elmwood fell into disrepair.

In more recent years, there have been many efforts to restore many older mansions and revitalize the neighborhood. In 1980, two large, predominantly residential areas of Elmwood were added to the National Register of Historic Places as the Elmwood Historic District, with emphasis on their nineteenth century revival and Victorian houses. Additionally, the City of Providence has established local (municipal level) historic districts as North Elmwood and South Elmwood, which protect historic properties and the neighborhood's historic identity by restricting exterior modifications of architectural items such as windows, porches, slate roofs, etc. Restoration efforts in Elmwood were featured on 'Season 11 of Bob Vilia's Home Again' when he helps 11 neighbors with various projects over the course of 13 episodes highlighting the historic nature of homes in the neighborhood.

== Demographics ==
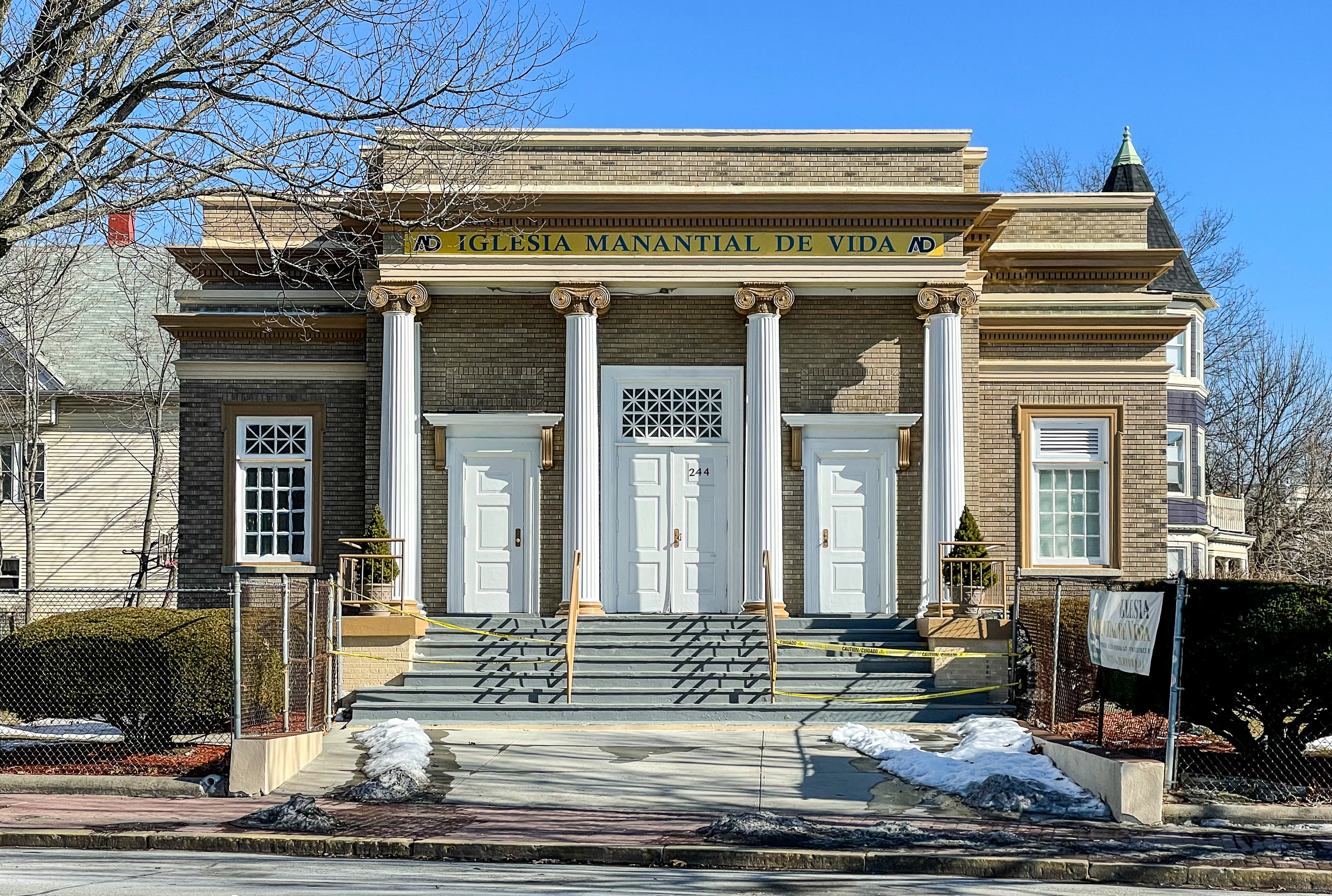
A Hispanic church on Elmwood Avenue

For census purposes, the Census Bureau classifies Elmwood as part of the Census Tract 2. This neighborhood had 6,408 inhabitants based on data from the 2020 United States Census.

The racial makeup of the neighborhood was 6% (387) White (Non-Hispanic), 9.1% (586) Black (Non-Hispanic), 2.9% (185) Asian, 1.1% (70) from some other race or from two or more races. Hispanic or Latino of any race were 80.8% (5,180) of the population. 62.8% are foreign born, with most foreign born residents originating from Latin America (87%).

The median age in this area is 47.1 years old. Family Households made up 84% of the population, and the average household (family and non-family) had 2.3 persons living there. 51% of the population was married. Out of the 2,892 vacant and non-vacant housing units, 43% were owner occupied, and 57% renter occupied. The average house was worth $358,600, which is slightly higher than the average in Providence. 15.2% of residents are below the poverty line.

== Government ==
At the municipal level of government, most of Elmwood is within Ward 9, though the area of Elmwood north of Potters Avenue falls within Ward 11. Carmen Castillo and Mary Kay Harris represent Wards 9 and 11, respectively, in the Providence City Council. Both are Democrats.

At the state level, nearly all of Elmwood falls within Rhode Island House District 11, with the exception of the area of Elmwood which lies west of Elmwood Avenue to the south of Columbus Square, which is in House District 10. Grace Díaz serves as the state representative for District 11; she was first elected in 2004. Scott Slater serves as the state representative for District 10; he was first elected in a special election in November 2009. All of Elmwood falls within Rhode Island Senate District 2; Elmwood is represented by Ana Quezada, who was elected to the seat in 2016.

At the federal level, all of Elmwood falls within RI Congressional District 1. David Cicilline, first elected in 2010, currently fills that seat.

== Parks, green space, and urban tree canopy ==
Green space

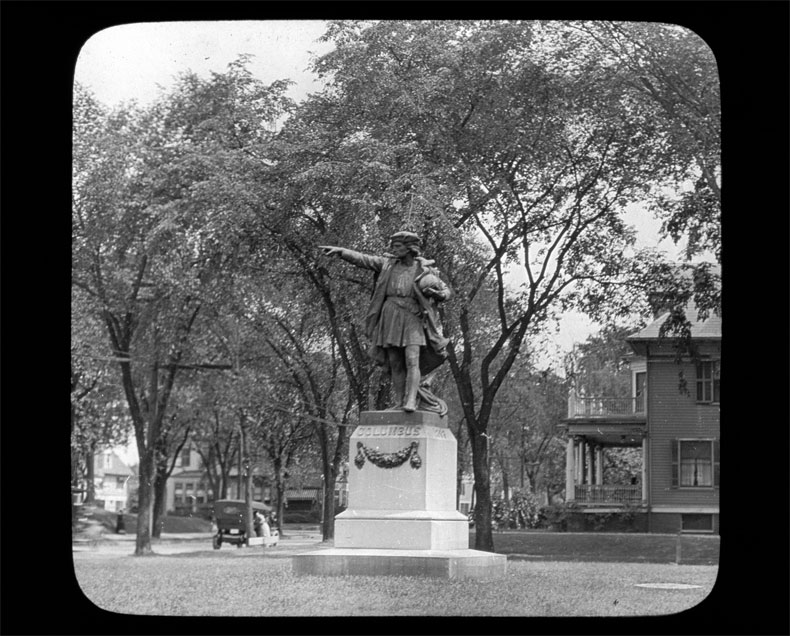
Columbus Square in 1915

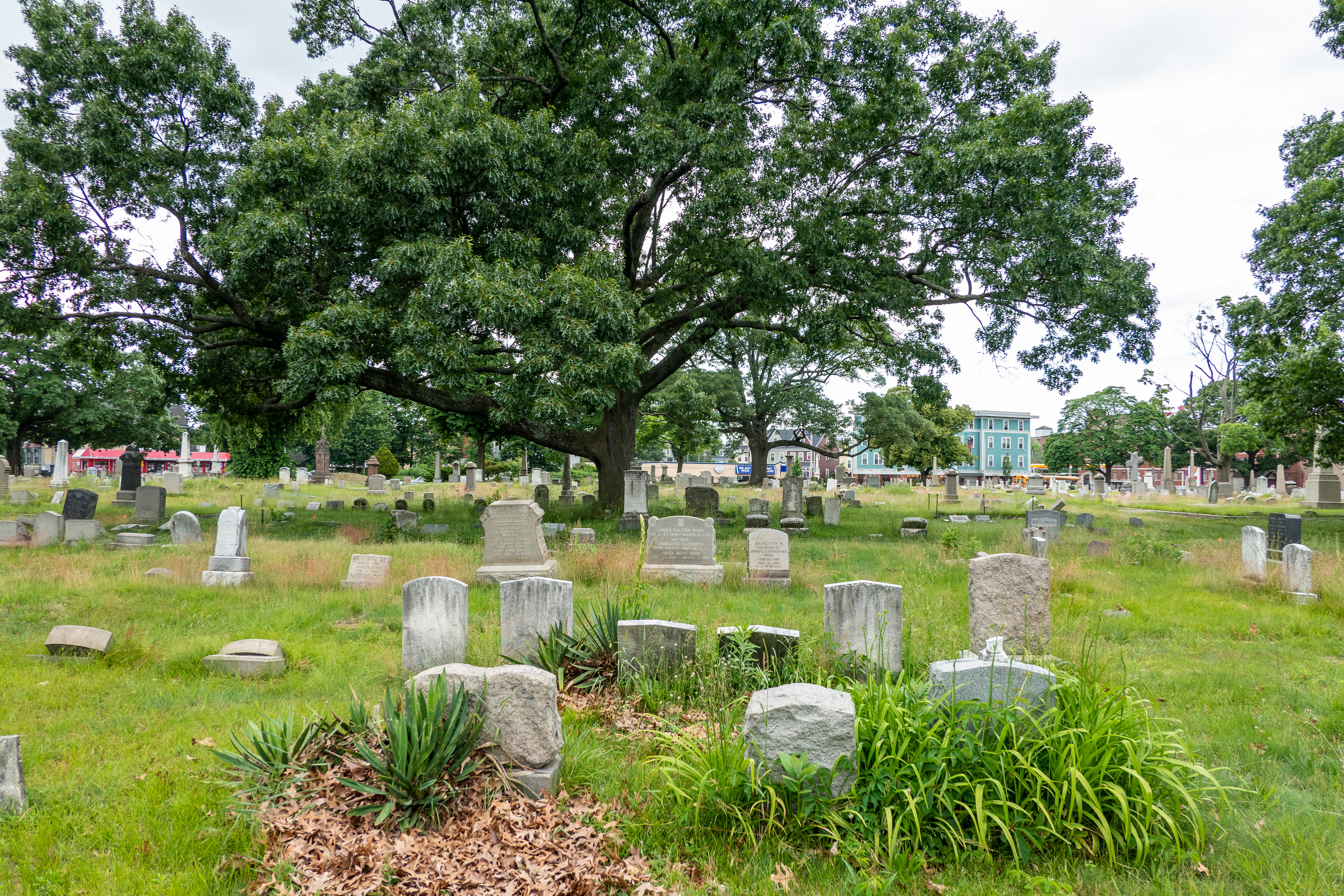
Grace Church Cemetery

Green space in Elmwood consists of parks, community gardens, and cemeteries.

Elmwood has five small parks: Sackett Street Park and Amos Earley Park south of Sackett Street, Jennifer Rivera Memorial Park on Niagara Street at Potters Avenue, Peace and Plenty Park at the intersection of Peace Street and Updike Street, and Columbus Square at the intersection of Elmwood and Reservoir Avenues. Except for Columbus Square, each of these parks has playground equipment for children.

There are several community gardens in Elmwood, including Cadillac Drive Community Garden, Laura Street Community Garden, and Peace and Plenty Community Garden.

Additional green space in Elmwood is provided by two historic cemeteries along Elmwood Avenue: Grace Church Cemetery at the northern tip of Elmwood, and Locust Grove Cemetery, which is part of the Providence Public Parks System and is adjacent to the South Elmwood Local Historic District. Immediately to the south of the neighborhood lies Roger Williams Park, the city's premier public park.

The urban forest in Elmwood is composed of trees in parks and cemeteries, trees on private property, and street trees which line the sidewalks of the neighborhood. As of 2006, Elmwood's Urban Tree Canopy was estimated at 16.3% of total land area. Elmwood's urban tree canopy was below the citywide average, which was 23% of total land area.

== Schools and libraries ==
Schools and libraries

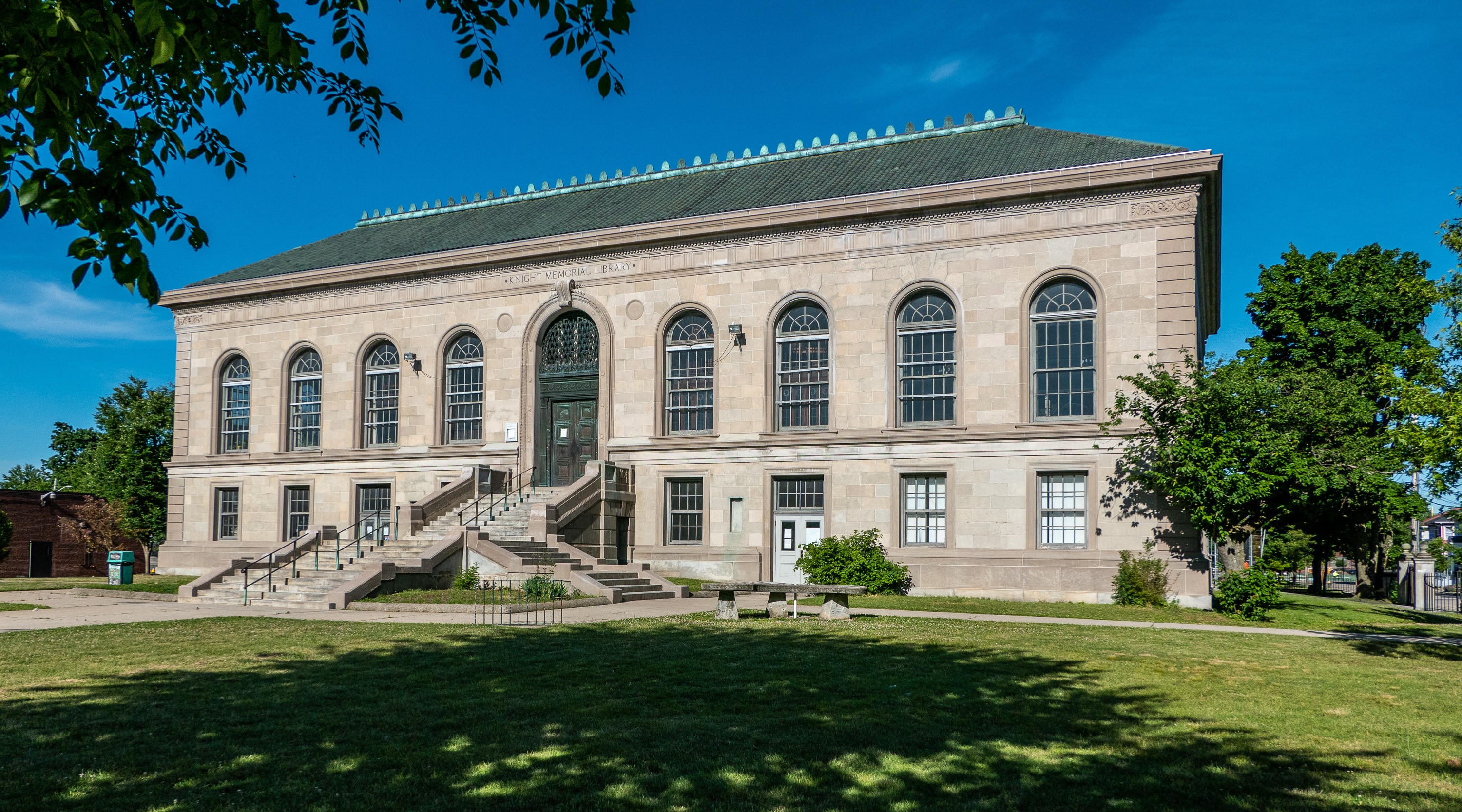
Knight Memorial Library

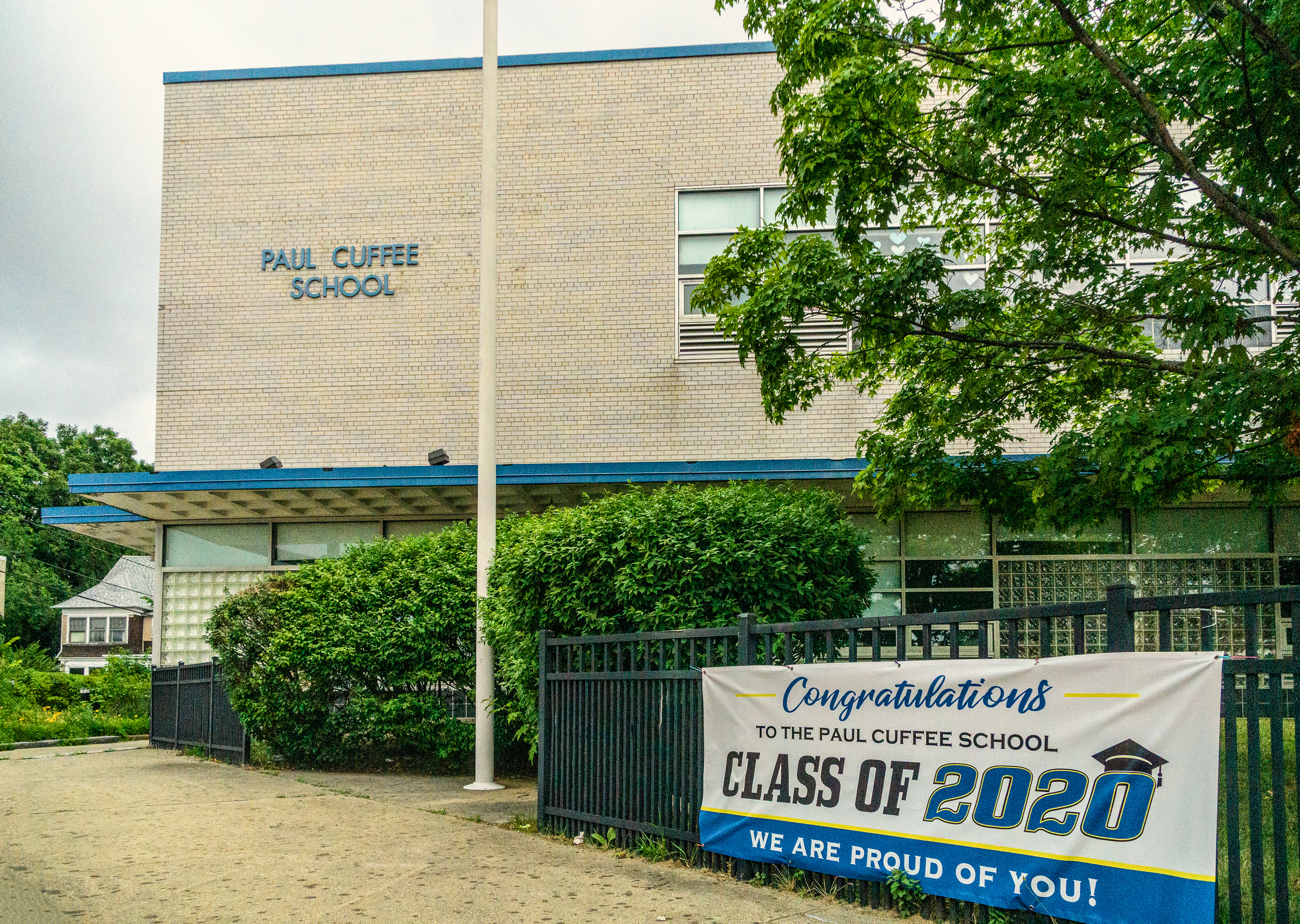
Paul Cuffee School

Elmwood has several schools within its neighborhood borders. The Sackett Street School is a public elementary school. Charter Schools operating in the neighborhood are Highlander Charter School and Paul Cuffee Upper School. Sophia Academy is an independent middle school for Providence residents. The Montessori Community School of Rhode Island offers a Montessori education.

=== Knight Memorial Library ===
The Knight Memorial Library on Elmwood Avenue services Elmwood, the West End, and other south side neighborhoods. The library was financed by the children of textile magnate Robert Knight on property which had been part of Knight's estate. The 17,000 square foot library was designed by renowned architect Edward Lippincott Tilton with a grand Italian Renaissance exterior and Beaux Arts Neoclassical interior, and opened in 1924.

Management of the library transferred from the Providence Public Library to a community group, the Providence Community Library, in 2009. The building was temporarily closed for "urgent repairs and upgrades" in 2017, and considered "endangered" by the Providence Preservation Society in 2018. A $554,000 grant from The Champlin Foundation in 2018 provided for repairs on the exterior masonry, roof, gutters, cornice and skylights.

== Arts and culture ==
Arts and culture

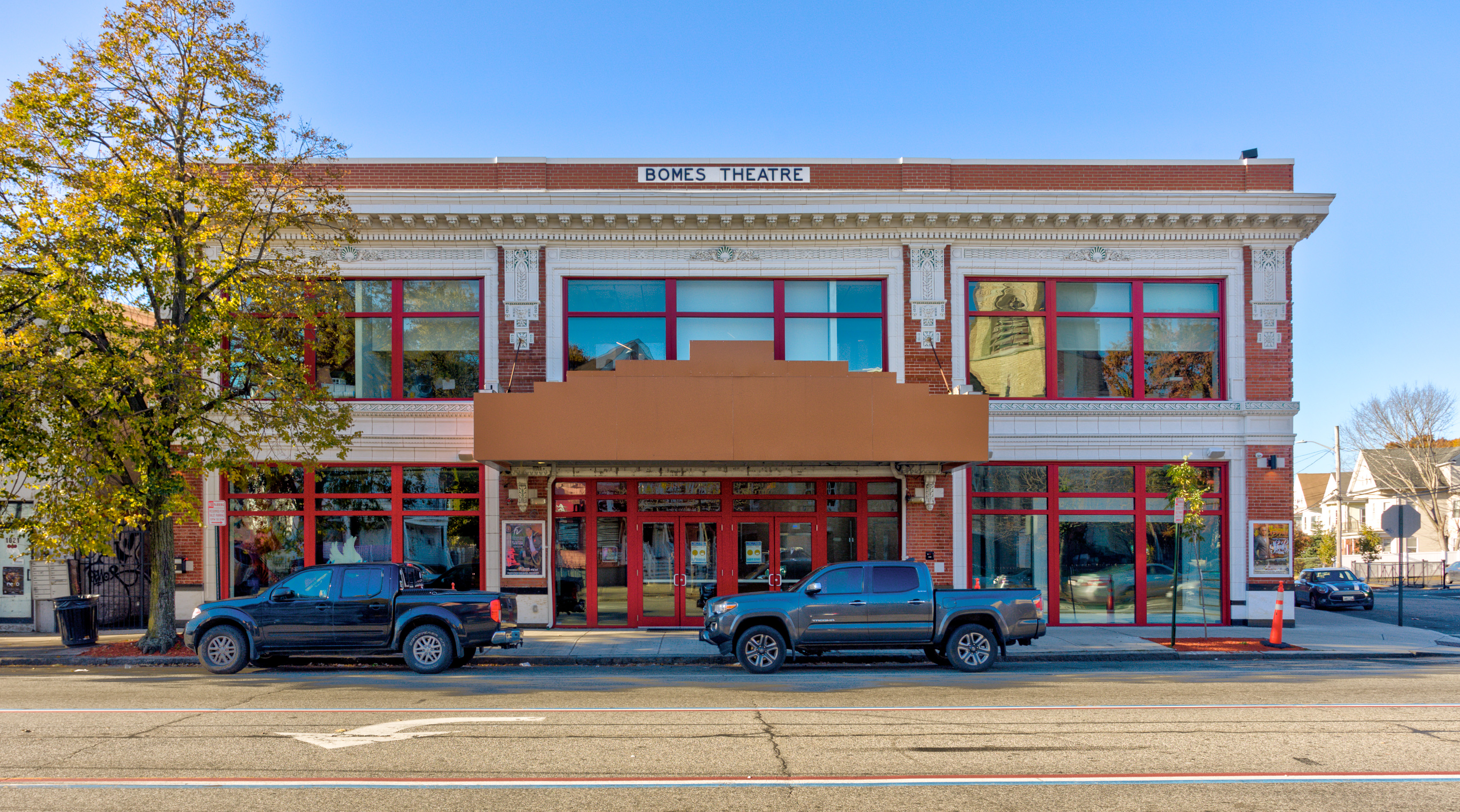
Bomes Theatre, Broad St.

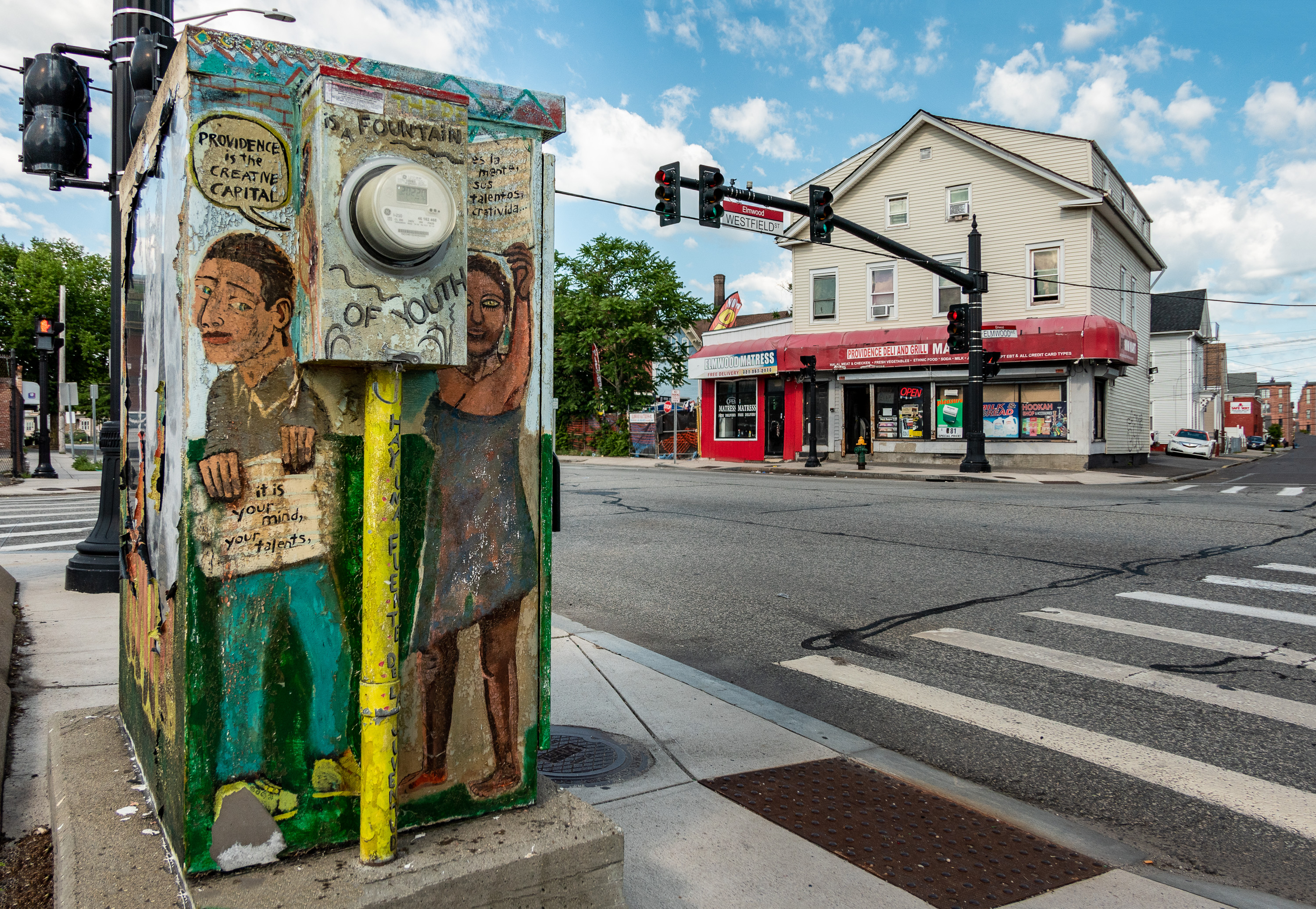
Street art on Elmwood Ave.

At the northern tip of Elmwood Avenue, and at the nexus of the Elmwood, Upper South Providence, and the West End neighborhoods, the Southside Cultural Center of Rhode Island hosts a number of arts and cultural organizations and offers performance space.

In 2018–19, the historic 1921 Bomes Theatre on Broad Street underwent a "complete restoration". The work included restoration of the historic exterior, reproduction 1940s era marquee, modern dinner theatre interior, and the creation of two new retail units and commercial office space on the second floor.

== Hospitals ==
St Joseph's Hospital for Specialty Care was a Catholic hospital located at 21 Peace Street in the northern portion of Elmwood. It once completed a line of four hospitals on the South Side that to the east includes Rhode Island Hospital, Women and Infants Hospital of Rhode Island, and Hasbro Children's Hospital.
