= Alfred Stone (architect) =

American architect (1834–1908)

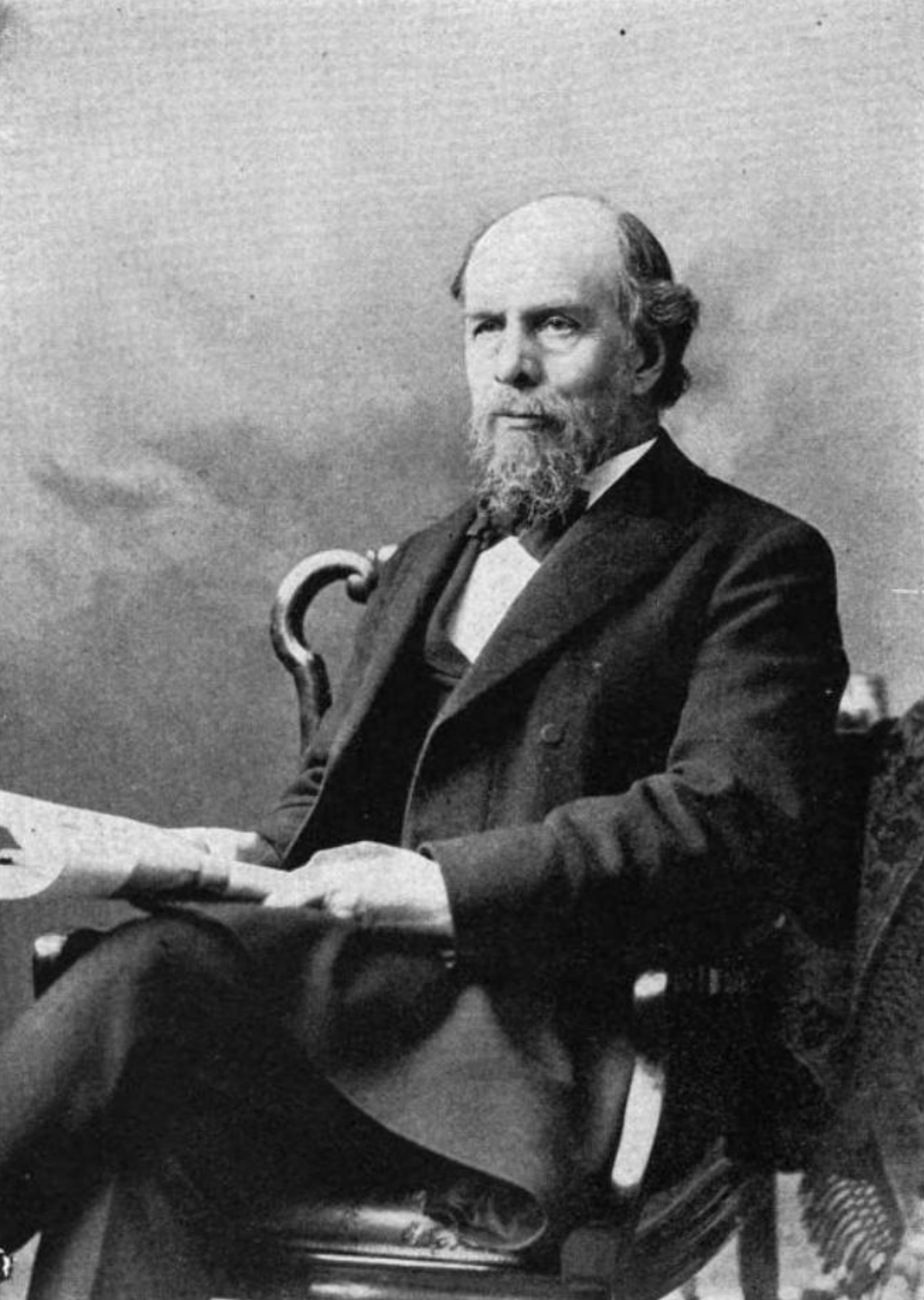
- Alfred Stone, 1834–1908
- Born: July 29, 1834; E.Machias, Maine, United States
- Died: September 4, 1908 (aged 74); Peterborough, New Hampshire, United States
- Occupation: Architect
- Spouse: Ellen Maria Putnam

Alfred Stone (July 29, 1834 – September 4, 1908) was an American architect. He was a founding partner of the Providence, Rhode Island, firm of Stone, Carpenter & Willson. Mr. Stone was best known for designing many prominent Rhode Island buildings, including the Providence Public Library, Union Station, buildings at Brown University and the University of Rhode Island, and many private homes.

== Early years and family ==
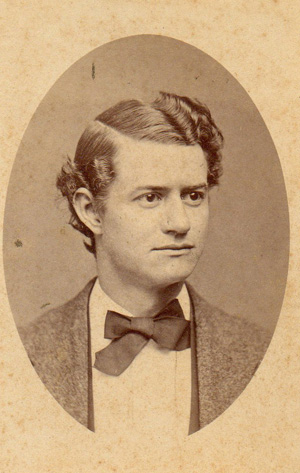
Stone as a young man.

Alfred Stone was born on July 29, 1834, in East Machias, Maine, to Rev. Thomas Treadwell Stone and Laura Poor Stone. He attended the Washington Academy in East Machias until the family moved to Salem, Massachusetts . While attending high school in Salem, he studied drawing and surveying. He graduated from high school in 1850. In 1852 he began his architectural training in the office of Towle & Foster. A few years later he moved to the office of Shepard S. Woodcock. In 1855 he moved again, to Washburn & Brown. He left the following year and began working for Arthur Gilman. While there, he designed the Hotel Pelham in Boston. While also there, he competed to design the 1858 City Hall in Portland, Maine, but did not even rank. In 1859 Stone moved to Providence and entered the office of Alpheus C. Morse, where he studied architecture until the outbreak of the Civil War. Stone married Ellen Maria Putnam in Salem in 1864.

== Career and later life ==
In 1864 Stone founded his own architectural firm in Providence, and then partnered with W. H. Emmerton in 1866. Emmerton was killed in a railroad accident in 1871. In 1873, Stone promoted longtime employee Charles E. Carpenter to partner, forming the firm of Stone & Carpenter. In 1882, the firm took on a recent Beaux-Arts graduate, Edmund R. Willson. Impressed with his work, Stone and Carpenter promoted him to junior partner in 1883. He was promoted to full partner a few years later, and the firm became Stone, Carpenter & Willson. Walter G. Sheldon became a partner in 1901.

Willson died in 1906. By 1907, the firm had been reorganized as Stone, Carpenter & Sheldon. The firm retained this name even after Stone's death in 1908. The firm soon lost its prestige, and was left to residential and alteration work. It disappeared soon after Carpenter's death in 1923.

Stone had a keen interest in land use issues in the Providence area. In the late nineteenth century he played a key role in guiding the expansion of Swan Point Cemetery, continuing the precepts of the original design. He served as the cemetery director and the last 12 years as president, from 1876 until his death. It was Stone who convinced his fellow cemetery directors to construct Blackstone Boulevard (built 1892–1894), as an easy means of getting to the cemetery.

Alfred Stone died at the home of his niece on September 4, 1908, in Peterborough, New Hampshire, and was buried in Swan Point Cemetery in Providence.

A city street is named in Stone's honor. Alfred Stone Road runs from the northern end of Blackstone Boulevard on Providence's East Side to Riverside Cemetery in Pawtucket.

Stone joined the American Institute of Architects in 1870, and was one of the founders of the Rhode Island chapter in 1875. In 1876 he was elevated to fellowship.

== Architectural work ==
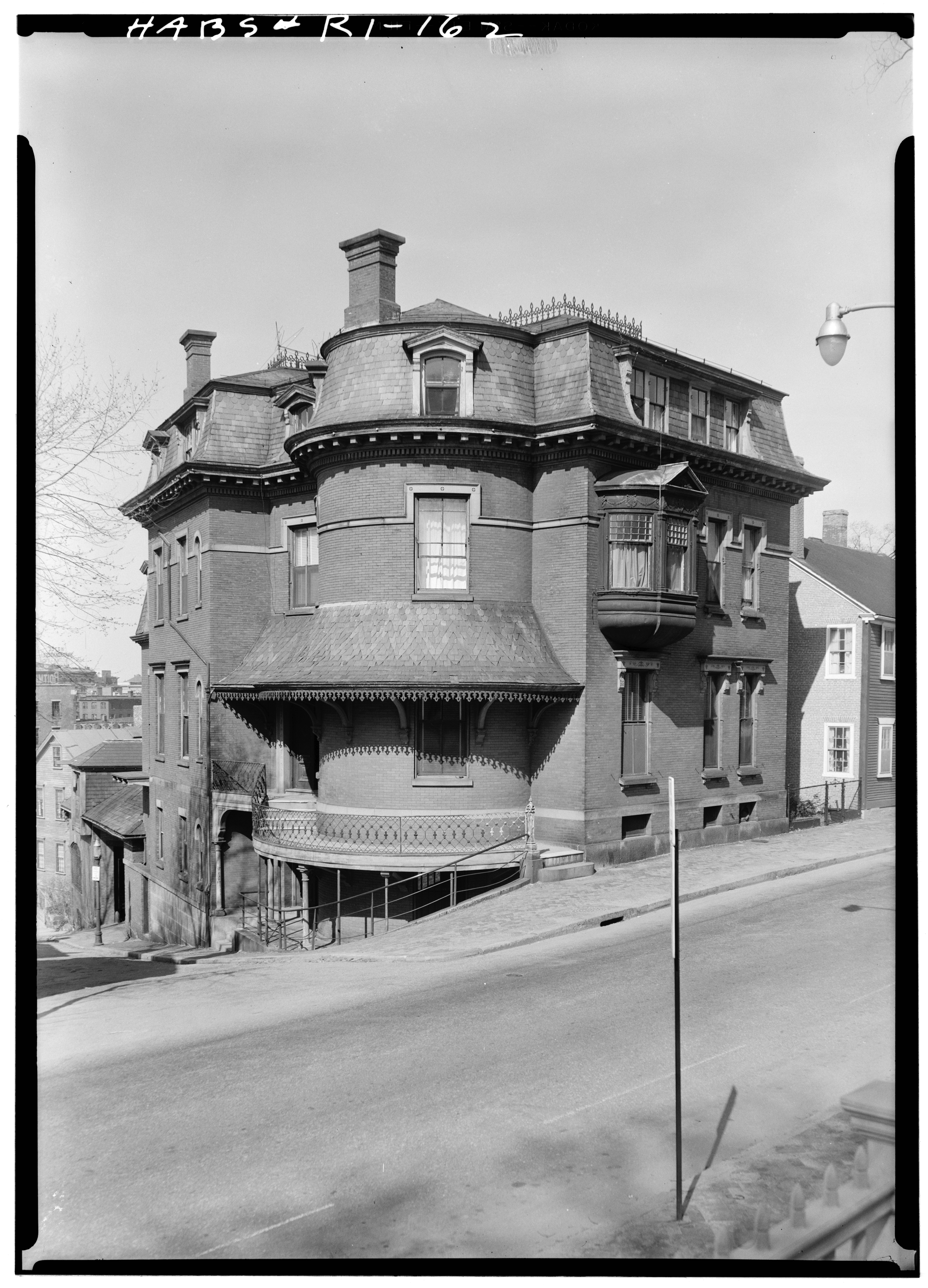
Burnside House

All of Stone's work was built in Providence, Rhode Island, except where noted.

=== While in private practice, 1864–1873 ===
- Zachariah Allen House, 1 Magee St. (1864) – now Brown's Faculty Club.
- Ambrose E. Burnside House, 314 Benefit St. (1866)
- Louisa Jane Hall House, 336 Benefit St. (1866)
- Owen Building, 101 Dyer St. (1866, 1877)
- Thayer Street Grammar School, 110 Thayer St. (1867) – demolished
- Union Railroad Co. Depot, Market Sq. (1867) – demolished
- Gatehouse, Swan Point Cemetery (1868) – demolished
- Jesse Metcalf House, 229 Woodward Rd., Wanskuck, Rhode Island (1868) – demolished 1948-49.
- Wood's Building, 4 S. Main St. (c.1868) – demolished 1931.
- Gilbert Congdon & Co. Building, 155-161 Canal St. (1869) – Later the home of Congdon, Carpenter & Co. Demolished.
- Louis H. Comstock House, 47 Parkis Ave. (1869)
- Barnaby Building, 252 Westminster St. (1870) – demolished
- Soldiers' and Sailors' Monument (Pedestal), Kennedy Plaza (1871)
- Elizabeth Building, 100 N. Main St. (1872)
- Hope Reservoir Pumping Station, Olney & Brown Sts. (1872) – demolished
- Wheaton & Anthony Building, 75 Westminster St. (1872, 1881) – demolished

=== Stone & Carpenter, 1873–c.1885 ===
- David Duncan Ward, Butler Hospital, 345 Blackstone Blvd. (1873)
- Pettaconsett Pumping Station, Pettaconsett Ave., Howard, Rhode Island (1873) – demolished
- Anthony Mill, 624 Washington St., Anthony, Rhode Island (1874) – remodeled as apartments in 2013
- English and Classical School, 46 Snow St. (1874) – a private school, also the first home of the Providence Public Library; demolished
- Hope M. E. Church, 51 Main St., Hope, Rhode Island (1874) – No longer a church. Altered.
- Jerothmul B. Barnaby House, 299 Broadway (1875)
- Crompton Free Library, 1679 Main St., West Warwick, Rhode Island (1876)
- Providence County Courthouse, 250 Benefit St. (1875–77) – demolished 1931
- The Oaks (Henry P. Russell Estate), 1085 Ives Rd., Potowomut, RI (1875) – main house burned
- Charles D. Owen House, 23 Nayatt Rd., Barrington, Rhode Island (1876)
- Parish House for First Congregational Church, 1 Benevolent St. (1877)
- What Cheer Cottage, Roger Williams Park, 1000 Elmwood Ave. (1877) – demolished 1896
- Froebel School (Hillel House), 80 Brown St. (1878) – built as a school for the training of kindergarten teachers
- Hotel Dorrance, 187 Westminster St. (1878) – demolished
- Samuel G. Allen House, 22 Main St., Hope, Rhode Island (1878)
- Rhode Island State Prison, 1375 Pontiac Ave., Howard, Rhode Island (1878) – now the maximum security prison
- Slater Hall, 70 George St., Brown University (1878)
- Alpheus S. Packard House, 275 Angell St. (1879)
- Francis W. Goddard House, 71 George St. (1879) – now owned by Brown
- Amasa Mason Block, 129 Eddy St. (1880) – Demolished.
- Cheapside Block, 30 N. Main St. (1880) – Now part of RISD's Design Center.
- Macullar, Parker & Co. Building, 112 Westminster St. (1880) – Demolished.
- Music Hall Building, 229 Main St., Pawtucket, Rhode Island (1880) – Demolished.
- William Goddard House (Remodeling), 38 Brown St. (1881) – Built for W. G. Goddard in 1830. Now owned by Brown.
- Stable and Carriage House, Butler Hospital (1881) – now the gymnasium
- Esther H. Baker House, 179 Hope St. (1882)
- Crompton Mills (Mill No. 4), Pulaski St., Crompton, Rhode Island (1882) – burned 1992
- St. Stephen's Row, 130-138 George St., Providence, RI (c.1882) – demolished
- Christopher Rhodes Greene House, 2 Potter Ct., Harris, Rhode Island (1883)
- Rathbone Gardner House, 314 Angell St. (1883)
- Davol Rubber Co. Factory, 1 Davol Sq. (1884)
- William W. Dunnell House, 16 Angell St. (1884)
- Rufus R. Wilson House, 240 Hope St. (1884)
- Lucius B. Darling Jr. House, 93 Summit St. (1885)
- Garden Street School, 27 Sterry St., Pawtucket, Rhode Island (1885) – Demolished.

(For later works, see Stone, Carpenter & Willson.)

== Memberships ==
American Institute of Architects, 1870–1908
