= Stone, Carpenter & Sheldon =

Practice information
- Partners: Alfred Stone; Charles E. Carpenter; Walter G. Sheldon; Gilbert Sheldon; William C. Mustard
- Founders: Alfred Stone; Charles E. Carpenter; Walter G. Sheldon
- Founded: 1906
- Dissolved: 1926
- Location: Providence, Rhode Island

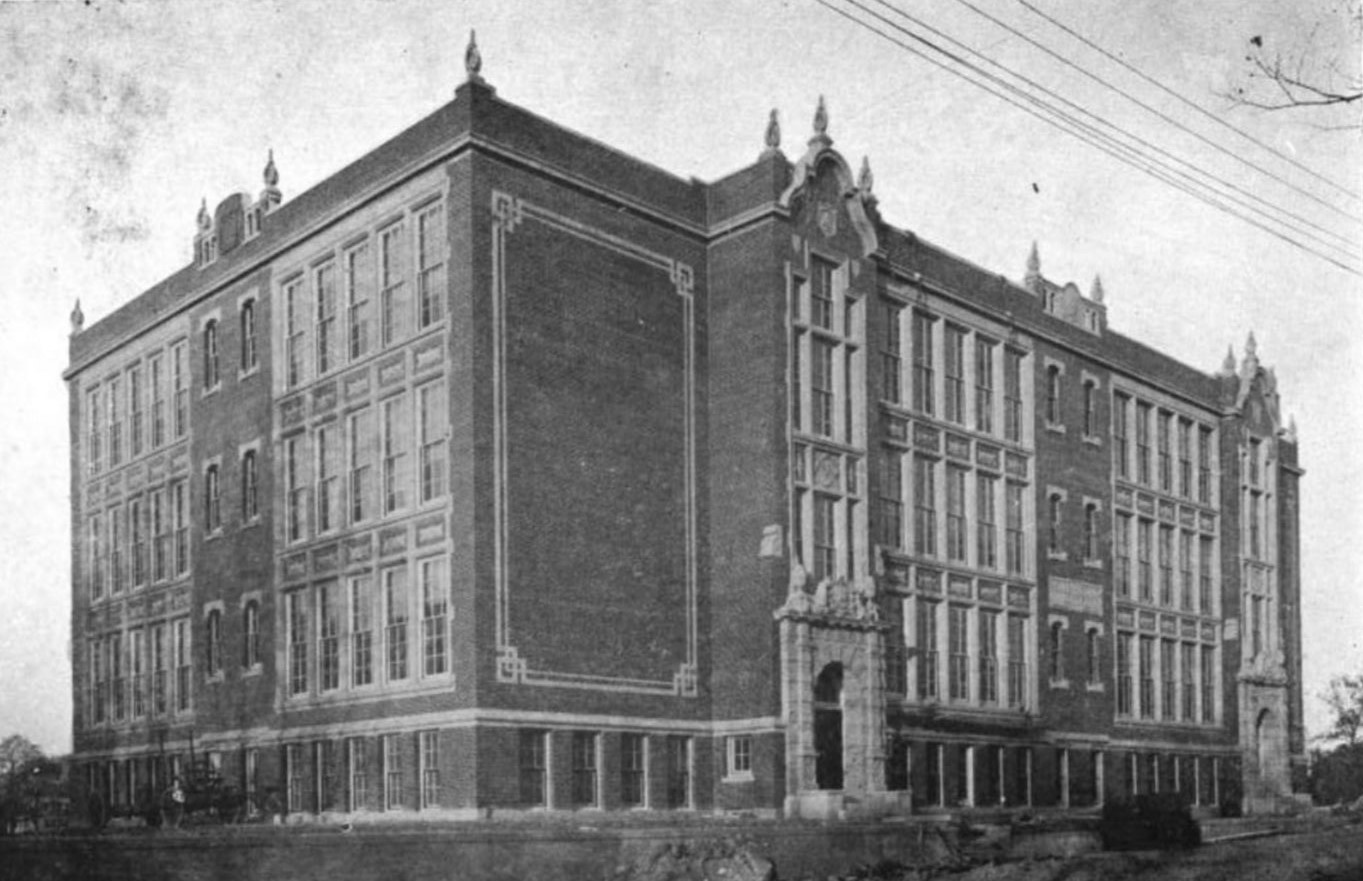
The former John Howland School in Providence, designed in the Jacobethan style by Stone, Carpenter & Sheldon and built in 1916.

Stone, Carpenter & Sheldon was an American architectural firm based in Providence, Rhode Island. Established in 1906 and dissolved in 1926, it was the successor firm to Stone, Carpenter & Willson.

== History ==
The firm of Stone, Carpenter & Sheldon was organized in 1906 as the partnership of architects Alfred Stone (1834-1908), Charles E. Carpenter (1845-1923), and Walter G. Sheldon (1855-1931). Sheldon, who had become a partner in the earlier firm in 1901, replaced Edmund R. Willson as the named third partner. Sheldon had been a significant designer within the firm, and took on those responsibilities. In 1908 Stone died, and Carpenter retired, leaving Sheldon as the only principal in the firm. By 1919 Sheldon was joined in partnership by his son, Gilbert Sheldon, and William C. Mustard. Due to declining health Sheldon retired in 1926, and the firm was dissolved.

In its early years, the firm retained some of the prestige of its predecessor, though this was mostly lost by the time of World War I. Their practice was mostly domestic, and they were responsible for alterations of several works by their predecessor firms. Many of their works, in Providence, Pawtucket and elsewhere, contribute to historic districts that have been listed on the United States National Register of Historic Places.

== Works ==
- 1906 - Freeman Cocroft House (Croftmere), 570 Post Rd, South Kingstown, Rhode Island
- 1908 - Carter Day Nursery, 295 Pine St, Providence, Rhode Island
  - Demolished.
- 1908 - Edward S. Macomber House, 134 Blackstone Blvd, Providence, Rhode Island
- 1908 - Charles H. Merriman House, 37 Cooke St, Providence, Rhode Island
- 1911 - Lena C. Martin House, 290 Blackstone Blvd, Providence, Rhode Island
- 1914 - Joseph Ott House (Remodeling), 97 Walcott St, Pawtucket, Rhode Island
- 1914 - Charles H. Warren House, 1030 Pleasant St, Worcester, Massachusetts
- 1915 - Walter S. Ingraham House, 149 President Ave, Providence, Rhode Island
- 1915 - Palmer Block, 100 Fountain St, Providence, Rhode Island
  - Stone, Carpenter & Sheldon added four more stories in 1916–17.
- 1916 - John Howland School, 120 Cole Ave, Providence, Rhode Island
  - Demolished.
- 1916 - Industrial Trust Branch, 14 High St, Westerly, Rhode Island
- 1916 - Newport Art Museum, 76 Bellevue Ave, Newport, Rhode Island
  - Alterations to the John N. A. Griswold House to create studios and galleries for the museum.
- 1917 - Dormitory, Rhode Island School for the Deaf, 520 Hope St, Providence, Rhode Island
- 1918 - Union Trust Building (Addition), 170 Westminster St, Providence, Rhode Island
- 1921 - Joseph Ott House, 290 Ocean Rd, Narragansett Pier, Rhode Island
