= Elizabeth Building =

- U.S. National Register of Historic Places
- U.S. National Historic Landmark District – Contributing property
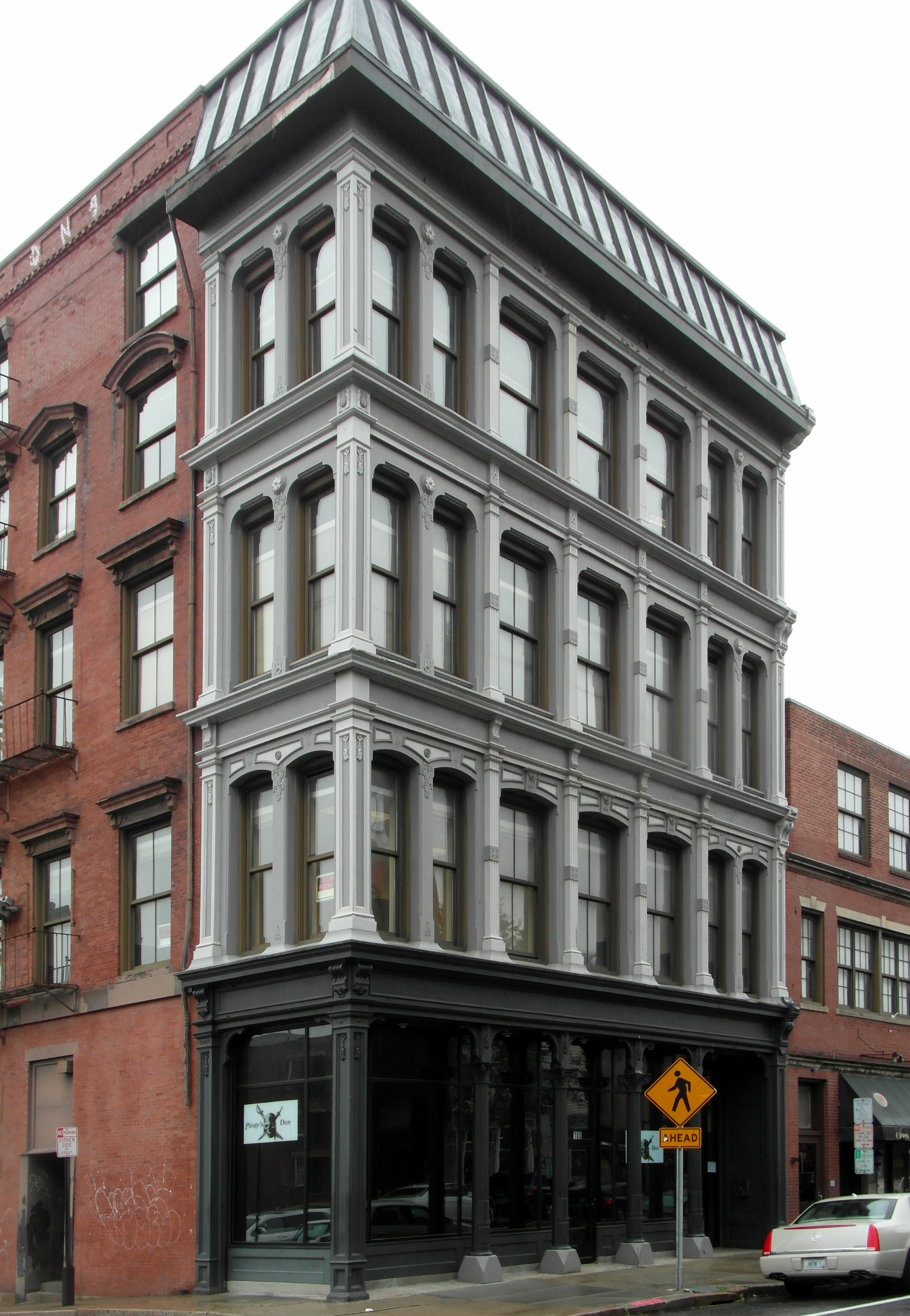

- Location within Rhode Island Location within the United States
- Location: 100 North Main Street, Providence, Rhode Island
- Coordinates: 41°49′41″N 71°24′38″W
- Built: 1872
- Architect: Alfred Stone
- Architectural style: Italianate
- Part of: College Hill Historic District (ID70000019)
- NRHP reference No.: 71000034

Significant dates
- Added to NRHP: November 5, 1971
- Designated NHLDCP: November 10, 1970

The Elizabeth Building is a historic commercial building at 100 North Main Street in the College Hill neighborhood of Providence, Rhode Island. The five-story masonry building was built in 1872 for noted local developer Rufus Waterman.

== Architecture ==
The building was designed by Alfred Stone and is one of Providence's few surviving commercial buildings with a cast iron facade. The facade is five bays wide, the bays separated by engaged Corinthian columns, with each floor separated from the next by an entablature with bracketed frieze. The outer bays have paired windows, while the three inner bays have larger sash windows. The decorative elements of the main facade are continued for a bay with paired windows on the left side elevation.

== History ==
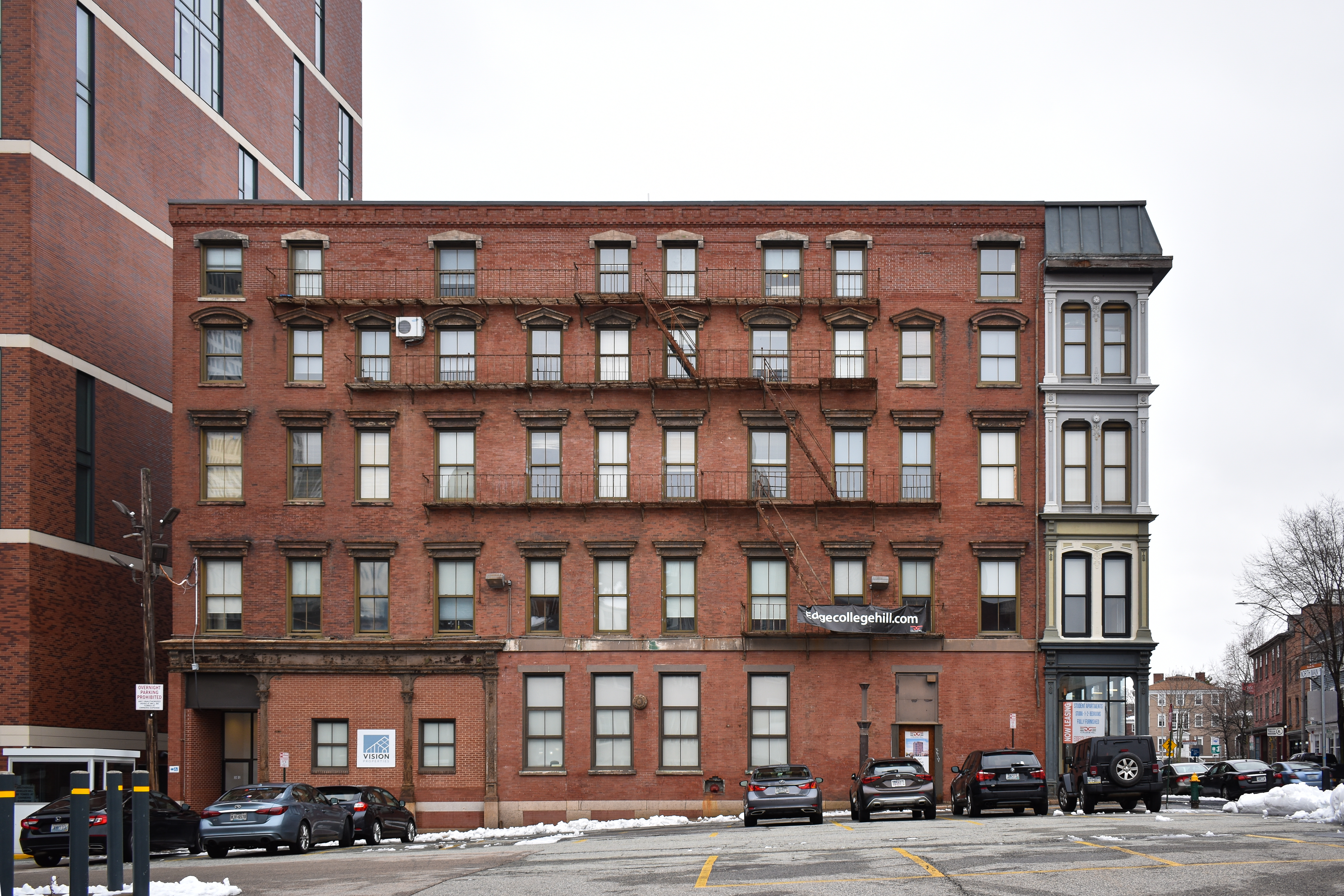
The building's southern facade.

The Elizabeth Building was formerly accompanied by another building designed by Stone. This structure, the Gilbert Congdon & Co. (Congdon & Carpenter) Building, was built in 1869 directly to the east, at Canal and Elizabeth Streets. Now demolished, it was similar to the still-standing Owen Building of 1866.

The Elizabeth Building has been a contributing structure of the College Hill Historic District since 1970.

In 1971, the building was independently listed on the National Register of Historic Places.

== See also ==
- National Register of Historic Places listings in Providence, Rhode Island
