= Providence Telephone Building =

- Providence Telephone Company
- U.S. National Register of Historic Places
- U.S. Historic district – Contributing property
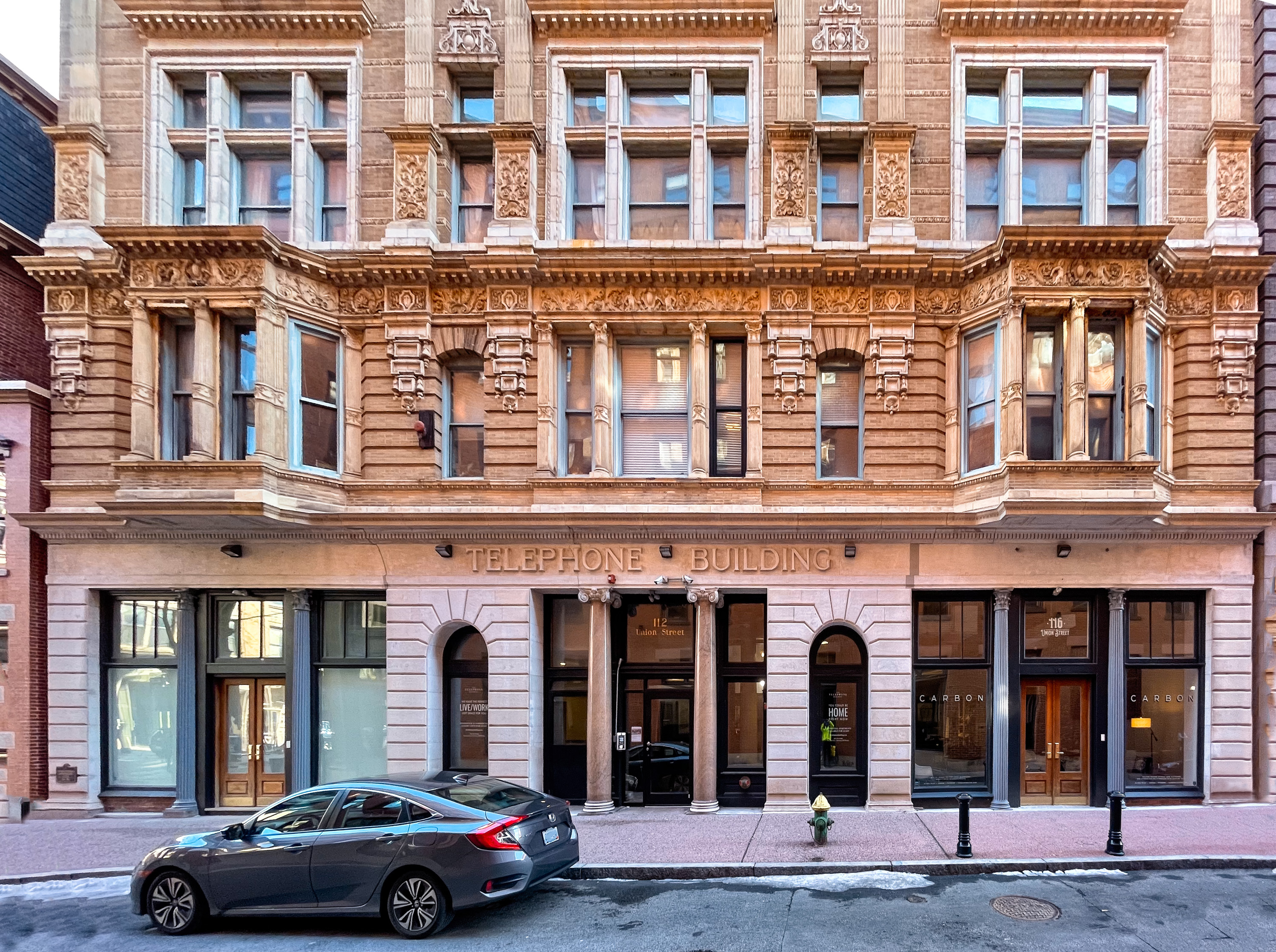

- Location within Rhode Island Location within the United States
- Location: Providence, Rhode Island
- Coordinates: 41°49′24″N 71°24′49″W
- Built: 1892-93; 1904-06
- Architect: Stone, Carpenter & Willson
- Architectural style: Renaissance Revival
- Part of: Downtown Providence Historic District (ID84001967)
- NRHP reference No.: 83000002

Significant dates
- Added to NRHP: August 4, 1983
- Designated CP: February 10, 1984

The Telephone Building is a historic commercial building at 112 Union Street in downtown Providence, Rhode Island. It was built as the headquarters and exchange of the Providence Telephone Company, which occupied it from 1893 to 1917.

== Building history and architecture ==
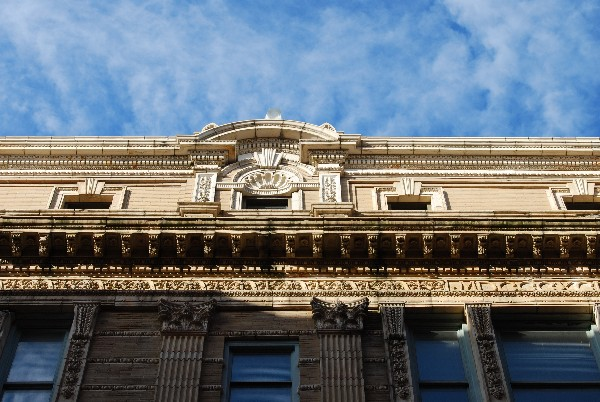
Details of the fourth and fifth floors

The Providence Telephone Company began construction on this building in 1892, and completed it in 1893. It was originally designed by Providence architects Stone, Carpenter & Willson as a three-story building. In 1904, due to growth of the company's business, construction began on an additional two stories. These were completed in 1906. After the Providence company moved its headquarters to the new Telephone Building in 1917, it kept ownership of the Union Street building and rented it out as office space. It has now been converted into apartments.

The street level facade is limestone, with a three-part entrance bay and two smaller flanking bays. The entrance bay is partitioned by Ionic columns, and the smaller outer bays are flanked by Corinthian columns. A complex entablature of grotesquework separates the second and third floors. The fourth and fifth floors, added in 1906, are more simply treated, with a simple parapet at the top.

== Company history ==
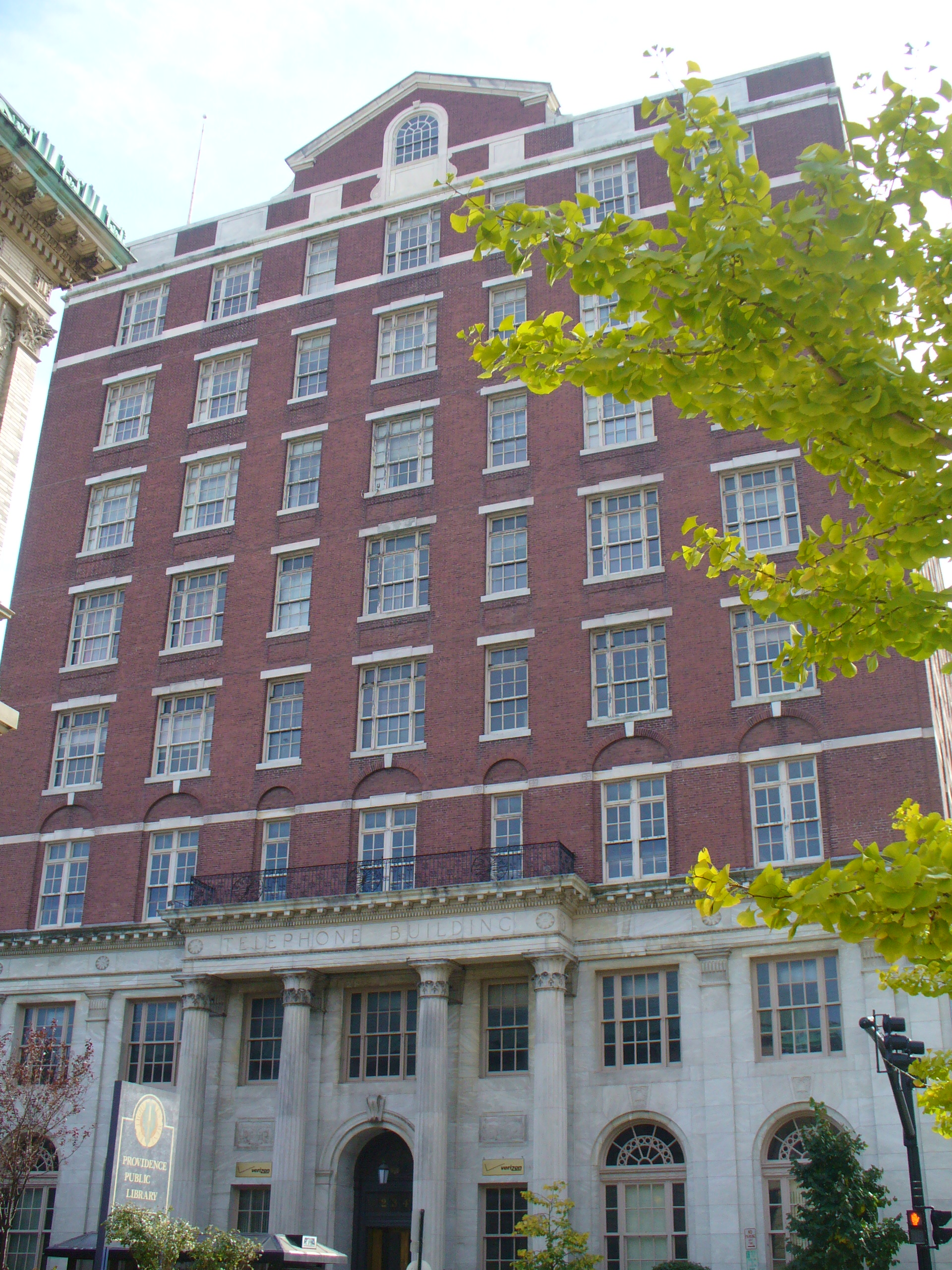
The second Telephone Building, completed 1917

The predecessor of the Providence Telephone Company, the Providence Telephone Exchange Company, was incorporated in Connecticut in March of 1879 by Rhode Island and Connecticut investors. Later that year former Governor Henry Howard formed the Providence Telephone Exchange Association, which acquired the stock of the Connecticut investors before merging with the Telephone Exchange Company in January of 1880.

In May of 1880 Howard incorporated the Providence Telephone Company. In addition to Howard, its notable directors included businessman Francis W. Carpenter. Howard was the first president of the company. The other presidents of the company were Henry C. Cranston from 1892 until his death in 1896, Dexter B. Potter from 1896 to 1916, Philip L. Spalding from 1916 to 1919 and Matt B. Jones from 1919 to 1921. Spalding and Jones were both officers of the New England Telephone and Telegraph Company of Boston, which had bought a controlling interest in the Providence company in 1915. The two companies were consolidated in 1921. Charles T. Howard, who had variously been secretary, treasurer and vice president of the Providence company since 1880, was elected a vice president of the New England company.

Despite the expansion of the Union Street building ten years earlier, by 1916 the growth of the Providence company had made the building inadequate. That year they began construction on the new Telephone Building at the corner of Washington and Greene streets, designed by Clarke & Howe. The company moved into the new building in 1917, which continues to be home to the regional office of Verizon New England.

The building was listed on the National Register of Historic Places in 1983.

== See also ==
- National Register of Historic Places listings in Providence, Rhode Island
