= Stone, Carpenter & Willson =

American architectural firm

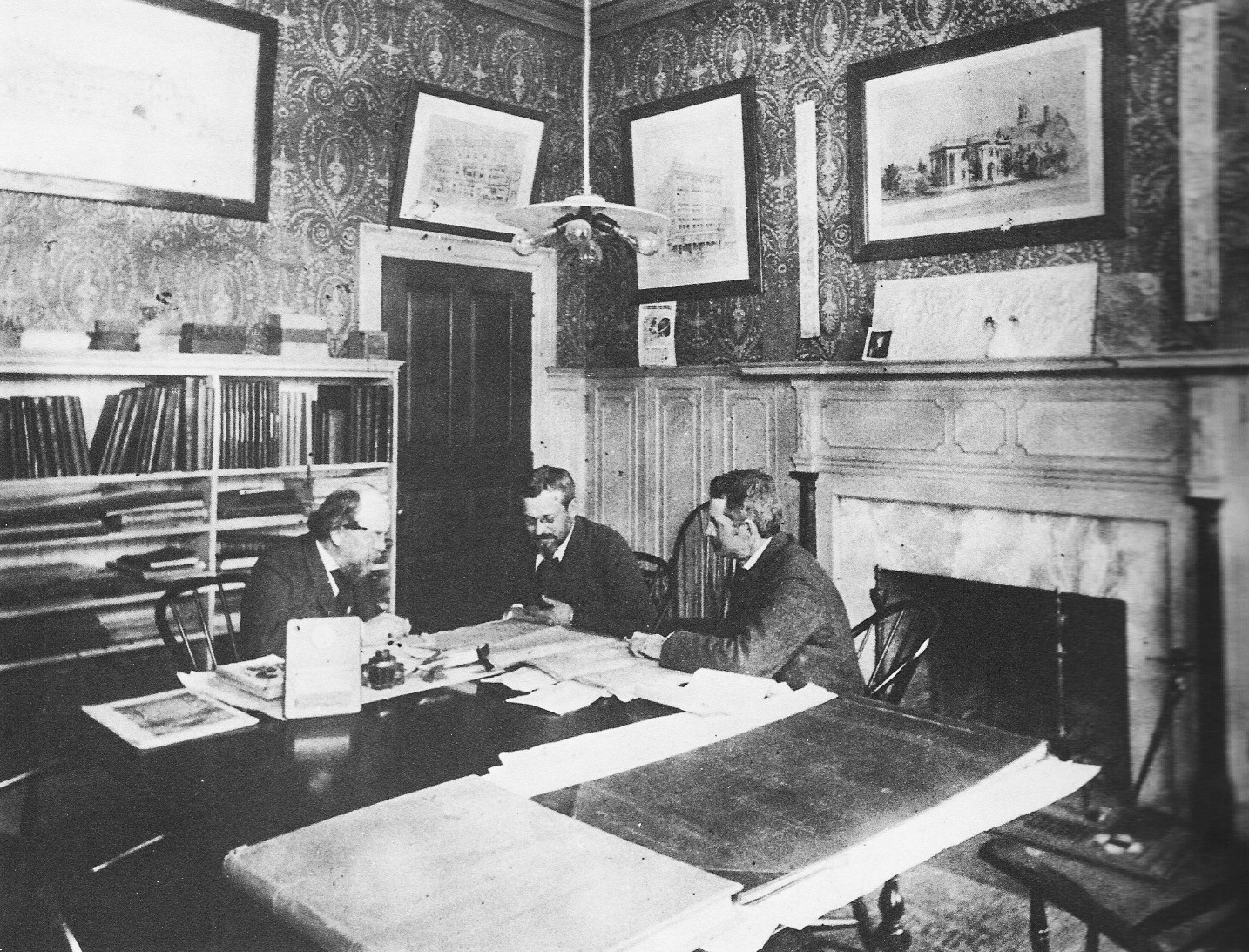
Stone, Carpenter & Willson, c.1895.

Stone, Carpenter & Willson was a Providence, Rhode Island–based architectural firm in the late 19th and early 20th Centuries. It was named for the partners Alfred Stone (1834–1908), Charles E. Carpenter (1845–1923). and Edmund R. Willson (1856–1906). The firm was one of the state's most prominent.

It was established about 1885 when Willson became a full partner in the Providence architectural firm of Stone & Carpenter.

== Partner biographies ==
Alfred Stone was born in East Machias, Maine, in 1834. He attended the Washington Academy in that town. His family later moved to Salem, Massachusetts. After graduating high school, he began his architectural training. He worked for Towle & Foster, Shepard S. Woodcock, Washburn & Brown, and Arthur Gilman. In 1859 he began working for Providence architect Alpheus C. Morse. He studied there until the outbreak of the Civil War. He went to enlist, but a knee injury prevented him from doing so. He then worked for various business interests, also traveling in the British Isles. He opened an architural office in Providence in 1864. From 1866 to 1871 William H. Emmerton, another Salem man, was Stone's partner. Emmerton was killed in the Great Revere Train Wreck of 1871. He practiced alone until 1873, when Charles E. Carpenter became partner. This association remained unchanged for a decade, when Willson was added. Stone died December 4, 1908, in Peterborough, New Hampshire.

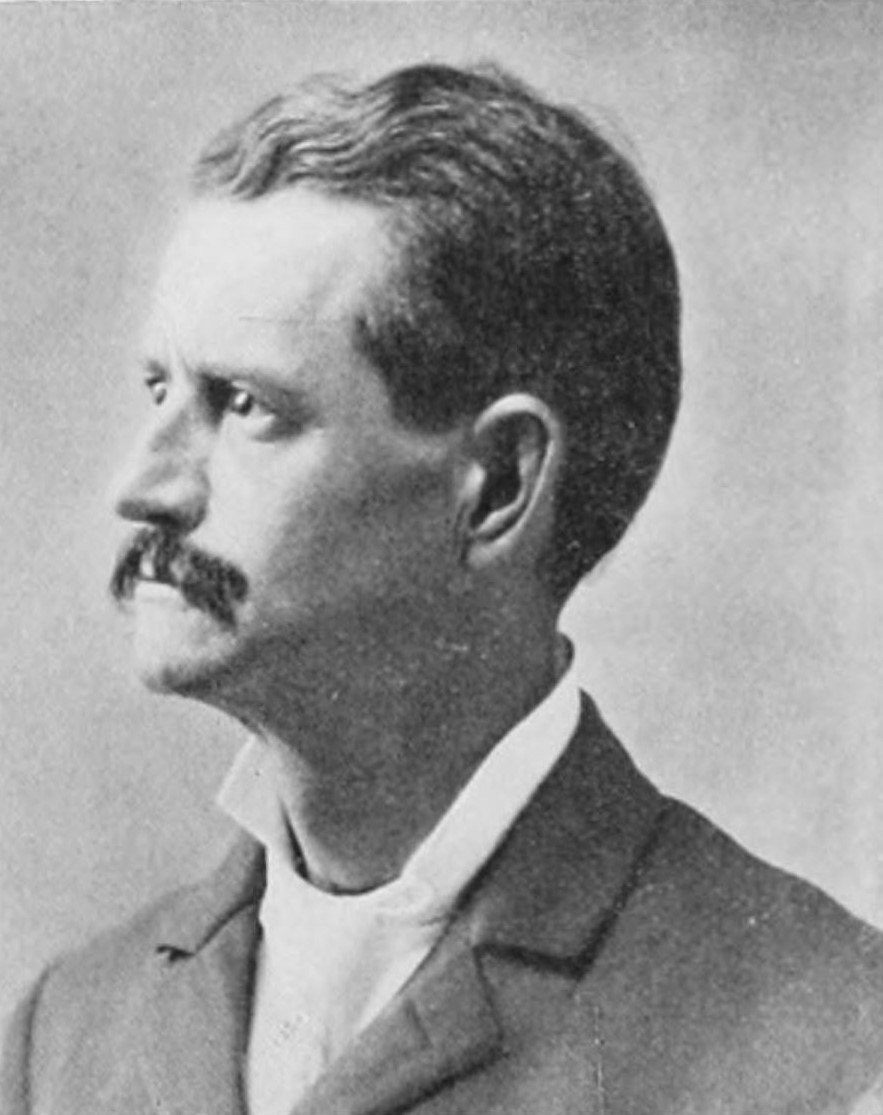
C. E. Carpenter, 1897.

Charles Edmund Carpenter was born in Pawtucket, Rhode Island, on May 1, 1845. He attended the public schools until the age of 17, when he enlisted in the Union Army. He was discharged three months later, and returned to school. He began to work under Providence civil engineer William S. Haines, learning the business. He became interested in architecture, deciding to study it instead. He entered the office of Alfred Stone in 1867, and was made a partner in 1873. He retired from the firm's affairs in 1908, after the death of Stone. He died in 1923.

Carpenter joined the American Institute of Architects in 1875 as a fellow, and was a founding member of the Rhode Island chapter the same year.

In 1894 he married Eudora C. Sheldon, sister of Walter G. Sheldon.

Edmund Russell Willson was born on April 21, 1856, in West Roxbury, Massachusetts, now part of Boston. He was the son of Edmund B. Willson, a pastor, and Martha Anne (Buttrick) Willson. In 1859 Willson removed his family to Salem, where he took charge of the North Church, now the First Church in Salem. Edmund R. Willson attended Salem High School, graduating at the young age of 15 in 1871. He then entered Harvard University. He was there four years, graduating in 1875. After his graduation, he found a position in the office of Peabody & Stearns, Boston's leading architects. He also took an additional 9-month course in architecture at the Massachusetts Institute of Technology. After a year he left Peabody & Stearns and moved to Sturgis & Brigham. After a year and a half there he left Boston and relocated to New York City, where he worked under Charles Follen McKim in McKim, Mead & Bigelow. McKim, recognizing Willson's talent and potential, convinced him to study abroad. He departed in May 1879, with a friend, William E. Chamberlin. Not long after their arrival in Paris, Willson and Chamberlin both gained admission to the École nationale supérieure des Beaux-Arts, and both entered the atelier of Joseph Auguste Émile Vaudremer. He returned to the United States in December 1881. In early 1882 he secured a position in the Providence firm of Stone & Carpenter. He was soon given a position of high responsibility, taking the firm's designs in a new direction. Recognizing this, in 1883 Alfred Stone and Charles E. Carpenter decided to admit him as a junior partner. He was given a full partnership in about 1885, and the firm officially became Stone, Carpenter & Willson. He remained with them until his death. On December 14 of 1882 Willson married Anne Lemoine (Frost) Willson, whom he had known in Salem. He died September 9, 1906, in Petersham, Massachusetts. In 1884 Willson joined the American Institute of Architects, and became a Fellow in 1889 when the AIA merged with the Western Association of Architects and all members became Fellows.

In 1901, a fourth partner, Walter G. Sheldon, was added. Sheldon had worked at the firm for at least a decade. Despite the new partner, Sheldon's was not added to the firm's name. After Willson's death, however, the firm was renamed Stone, Carpenter & Sheldon, which it retained until its end in the 1920s. Other, later, partners included Sheldon's son, Gilbert Sheldon, and William C. Mustard.

== Architectural works ==
=== In Providence ===
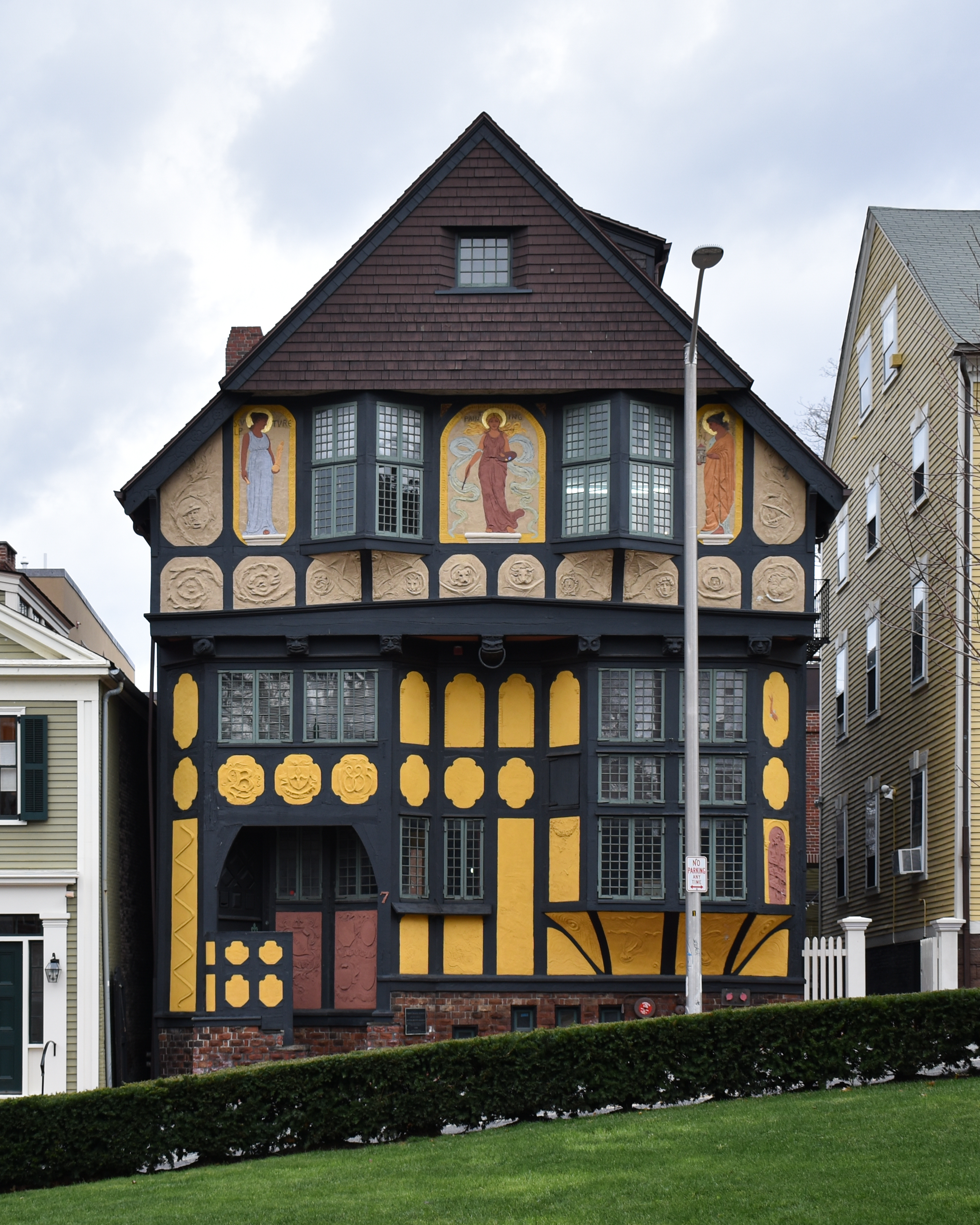
Fleur-de-lys Studios (1885)

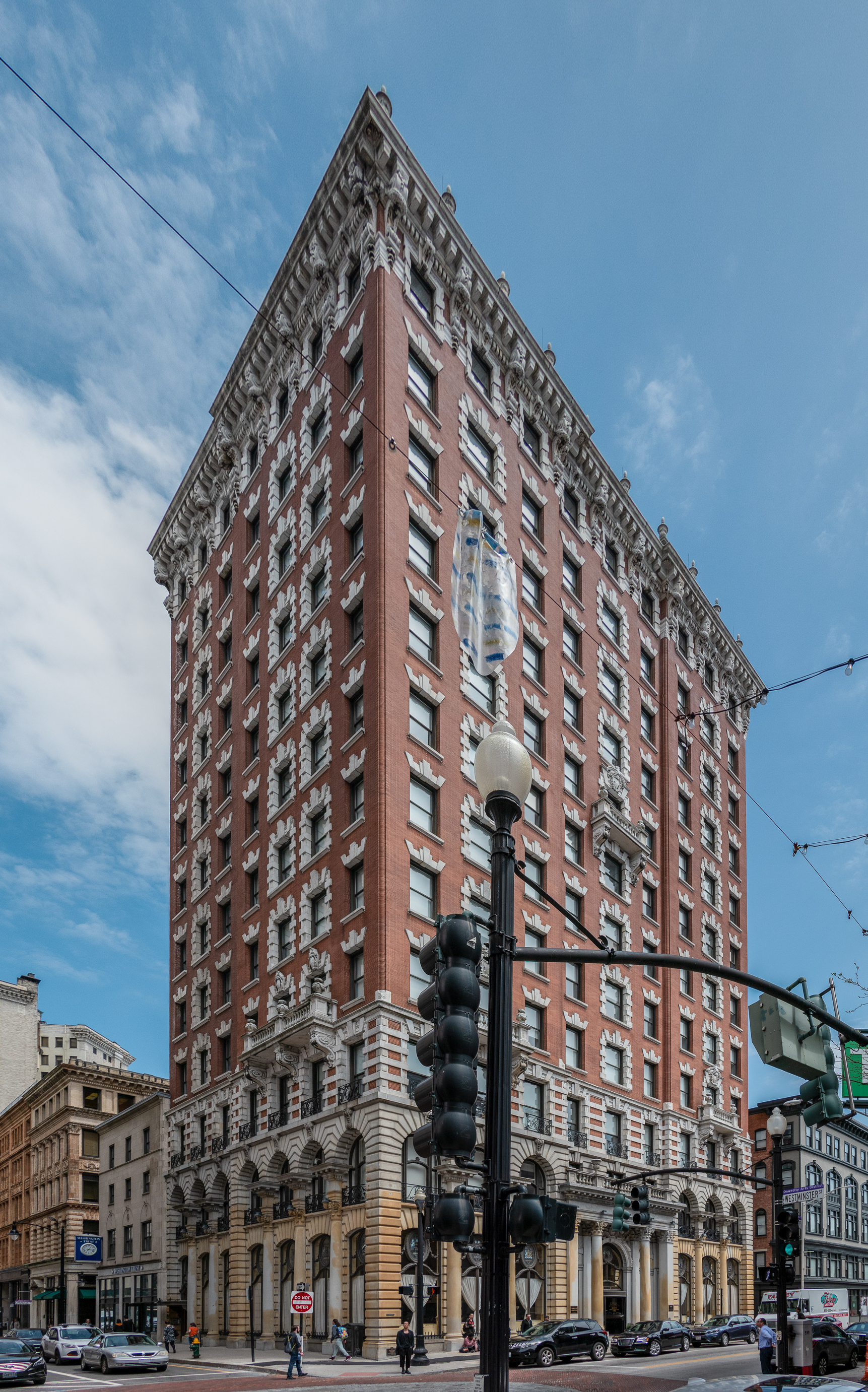
Union Trust Company Building

- Conrad Building, 373 Westminster St., Providence, RI (1885)
- Fleur-de-lys Studios, 7 Thomas St., Providence, RI (1885)
- George M. Smith House, 165 Hope St., Providence, RI (1886)
- Granville Gardiner House, 323 Angell St., Providence, RI (1886)
- Sawyer Building, Butler Hospital, 345 Blackstone Blvd., Providence, RI (1886)
- Zechariah Chaffee Jr. House, 169 Hope St., Providence, RI (1886) - This house was moved from 129 Hope in 1977.
- Stephen Waterman House, 70 Stimson Ave., Providence, RI (1887)
- William Wilkinson Building, 210 Westminster St., Providence, RI (1887)
- Y.M.C.A., 519 Westminster St., Providence, RI (1887) - This building was demolished in 1913.
- Enterprise Building, 7 Eddy St, Providence, RI (1888) - This building has been demolished.
- Estelle R. Jackson House, 8 Young Orchard Ave., Providence, RI (1888) - This house was demolished in the 1970s.
- Exchange Bank Building, 59 Westminster St., Providence, RI (1888)
- Israel B. Mason House, 571 Broad St., Providence, RI (1888)
- James Bartlett Jr. House, 254 Knight St., Providence, RI (1888)
- Wilbour Hall, Prospect and George Streets (1888)
- Jeffrey Davis House, 260 Elmwood Ave., Providence, RI (1888)
- John McManus House, 265 Bowen St., Providence, RI (1888)
- Lyman Klapp House, 217 Hope St., Providence, RI (1888)
- James A. Potter House, 359 Broad St., Providence, RI (1889)
- Josephine Rathbone House, 305 Hope St., Providence, RI (1889)
- Joseph E. Fletcher House, 19 Stimson Ave., Providence, RI (1889)
- Lyman Hall, 83 Waterman St., Brown University, Providence, RI (1889)
- Waterman Building, 12 Olneyville Sq., Olneyville, Providence, RI (1890) - Top 2 floors removed after the damages of Hurricane Carol
- Burrill Building, 291 Westminster St., Providence, RI (1891)
- Edmund T. Moulton House, 246 Hope St., Providence, RI (1891)
- Ladd Observatory, 210 Doyle Ave., Providence, RI (1891)
- South Main Street Fire Station, 303 S. Main St., Providence, RI (1891)
- G. Richmond Parsons House, 276 George St., Providence, RI (1892)
- Industrial Trust Co. Building (First), 49 Westminster St., Providence, RI (1892) - This building was demolished c. 1970.
- Main Building, Rhode Island School for the Deaf, 520 Hope St., Providence, RI (1892) - This has been demolished.
- George H. Dart House, 16 Stimson Ave., Providence, RI (1893)
- Telephone Building, 112 Union St., Providence, RI (1893)
- Central Police Station, 157 Fountain St., Providence, RI (1894) - Has been demolished.
- Frederick M. Sackett House, 177 George St., Providence, RI (1894)
- Lauderdale & Francis Buildings, 136 & 146 Westminster St., Providence, RI (1894)
- Ida M. and William L. Slade house, 40 Irving Ave., Providence, RI (1896)
- C. Morris Smith House, 112 Benevolent St., Providence, RI (1895) - This house was demolished in 1966.
- Robert W. Taft House, 154 Hope St., Providence, RI (1895)
- Frank W. Matteson House, 38 Cushing St., Providence, RI (1896)
- Providence Public Library, 150 Empire St., Providence, RI (1896) - Opened in 1900.
- Providence Union Station, 36 Exchange Ter., Providence, RI (1896)
- Remodeling, Providence Institution for Savings Building, 128 S. Main St., Providence, RI (1896)
- Carl Barus House, 30 Elmgrove Ave., Providence, RI (1897)
- Charles H. Warren House, 168 Governor St., Providence, RI (1897)
- John M. Rounds House, 72 Taber Ave., Providence, RI (1897)
- Pembroke Hall, 172 Meeting St., Pembroke College, Providence, RI - Pembroke is now part of Brown University.
- George O. Sackett House, 37 Arlington Ave., Providence, RI (1899)
- Southwest Pavilion, Rhode Island Hospital, 593 Eddy St., Providence, RI (1899)
- Addition, University Club, 219 Benefit St., Providence, RI (1900)
- Brunonia Hall, 175 Thayer St., Brown University, Providence, RI (1900) - This has been demolished.
- James M. Anthony House, 15 Arch St., Providence, RI (1900)
- Union Trust Co. Building, 62 Dorrance St., Providence, RI (1900)
- Remodeling for Marsden J. Perry, John Brown House, 52 Power St., Providence, RI (1901)
- Archie McMutry House, 41 Moore St., Providence, RI (1902)
- Edward B. Aldrich House, 144 Meeting St., Providence, RI (1902)
- John N. Mason Building, 169 Weybosset St., Providence, RI (1903) - The facade of this building was altered in 2002.
- Pendleton House, RISD Museum of Art, 224 Benefit St., Providence, RI (1904)
- Administration Building, Swan Point Cemetery, 585 Blackstone Blvd., Providence, RI (1905)
- Gerald M. Richmond House, 166 Waterman St., Providence, RI (1905)
- James P. Tierney House, 275 Olney St., Providence, RI (1905)
- Remodeling for Nelson W. Aldrich, Robert S. Burroughs House, 110 Benevolent St., Providence, RI (1905)
- Harold T. Merriman House, 158 Governor St., Providence, RI (1906)
- Sayles Gymnasium, 95 Cushing St., Pembroke College, Providence, RI (1906)

=== Elsewhere in Providence County ===
- Rhode Island State Almshouse, 1511 Pontiac Ave., Howard, Cranston, RI (1888)
- Pacific National Bank Building, 255 Main St., Pawtucket, RI (1890) - The upper floors of this building were remodeled c.1937.
- Wheaton Building, 228 Main St., Pawtucket, RI (1892) - Now the Toole Building, it was remodeling in 1922.
- Bridge Mill Power Plant, 25 Roosevelt Ave., Pawtucket, RI (1893)
- Pawtucket Boys Club, 53 East Ave., Pawtucket, RI (1902)

=== In Bristol County ===
- Henry J. Steere House, 100 Nayatt Rd., Nayatt, Barrington, RI (1885) - Now demolished, modeled on Providence's Nightingale-Brown House.
- Barrington Town Hall, 283 County Rd., Barrington, RI (1887)
- Industrial Trust Co. Branch, 414 Main St., Warren, RI (1906)

=== In Newport County ===
- The Mill (Adeline E. H. Slicer Cottage), 581 W. Main Rd., Little Compton, RI (1886)
- The Rock (Clarence T. Gardner Cottage), Round Pond Rd., Little Compton, RI (1886)
- Gatherem (Edwin W. Winter Cottage), 28 Grinnell Rd., Little Compton, RI (1905)

=== In Washington County ===
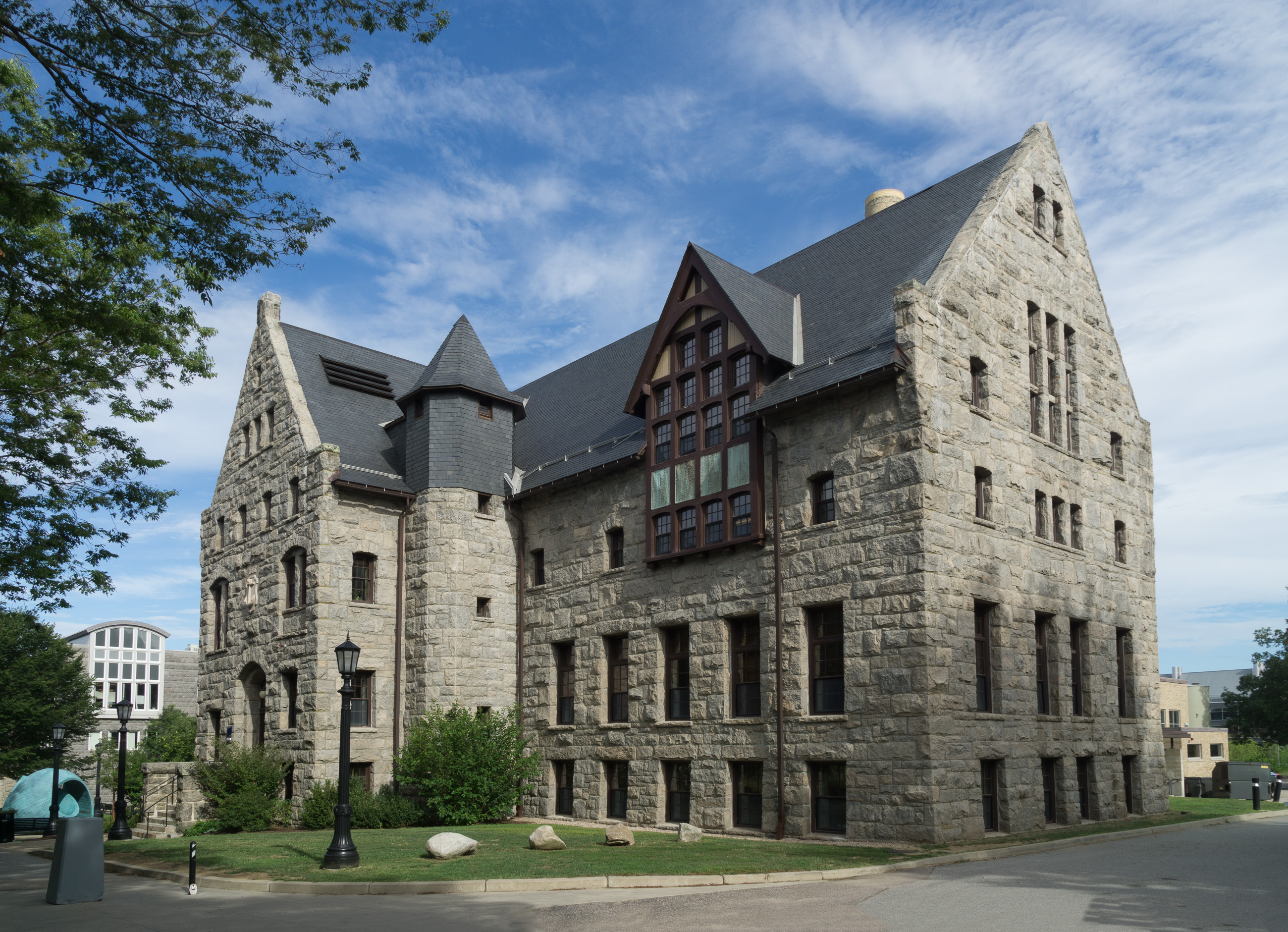
Lippitt Hall, University of Rhode Island (1897)

- Davis Hall, 10 Lippitt Rd., University of Rhode Island, Kingston, South Kingstown, RI (1895)
- Lippitt Hall, 5 Lippitt Rd., University of Rhode Island, Kingston, South Kingstown, RI (1897)

=== In Kent County ===
- Outbuildings, Indian Oaks (Nelson W. Aldrich estate), 836 Warwick Neck Ave., Warwick, RI (1899 et al.)

=== In other states ===
- Petersham Memorial Library, 23 Common St., Petersham, MA (1889)
- Frank E. Richmond Cottage, Grindstone Neck, Winter Harbor, ME (1891)
- Rhode Island State Building, World's Columbian Exhibition, Chicago, IL (1893) - Demolished after the fair.
- Scoville Memorial Library, 38 Main St., Salisbury, CT (1894)
- Nichewaug Inn, 25 Common St., Petersham, MA (1899)
- "Short Acre", 16 North Main St., Petersham, MA (1899) - remodel of Arron Brooks Jr., house (circa 1829)
- Whitney Memorial Library, 738 Main St., Bolton, MA (1903)
- Petersham Center School, 31 Spring St., Petersham, MA (1905)
- Strathglass Building, 25 Hartford St., Rumford, ME (1906)

== Gallery ==
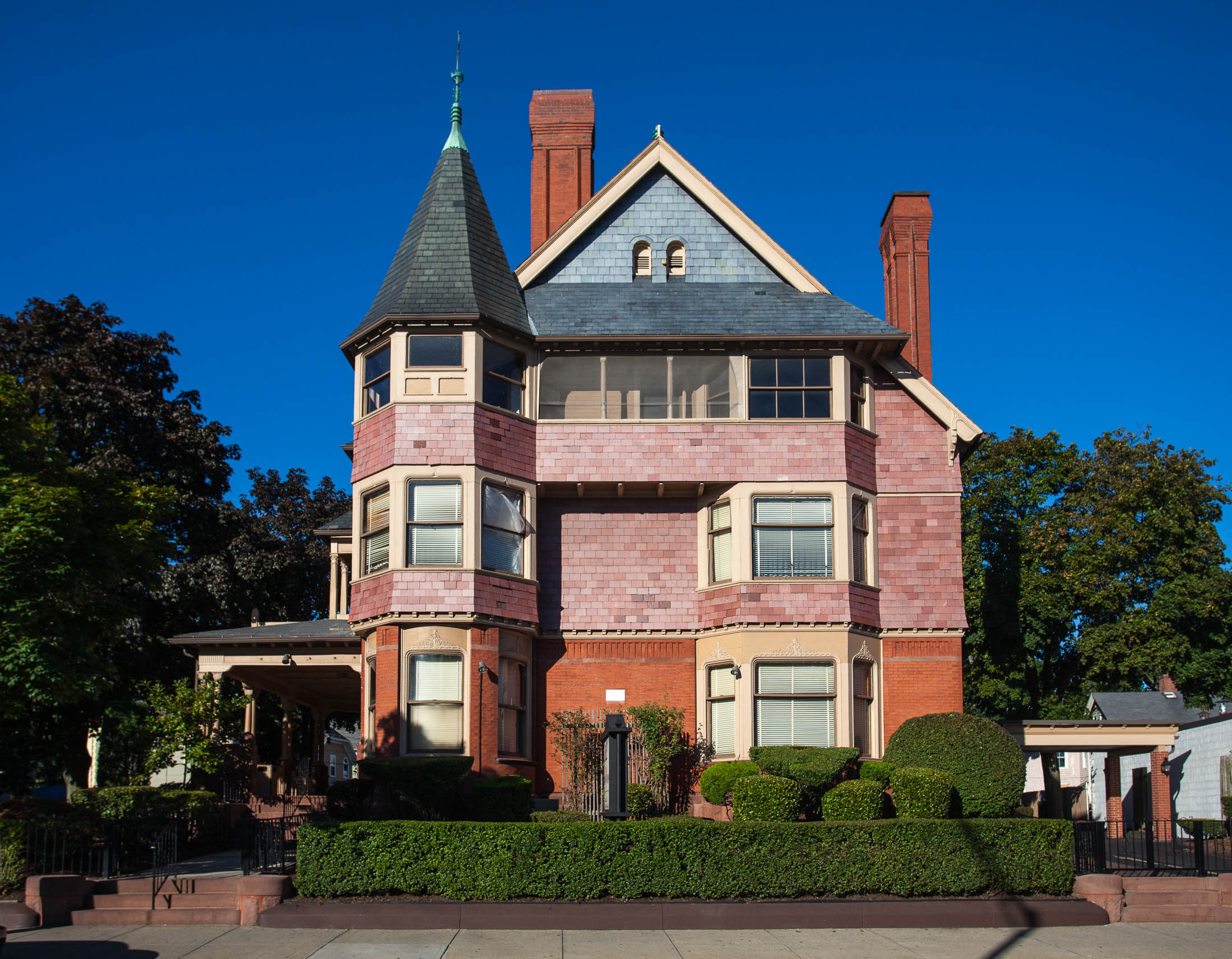
Israel B. Mason House, Providence, 1888

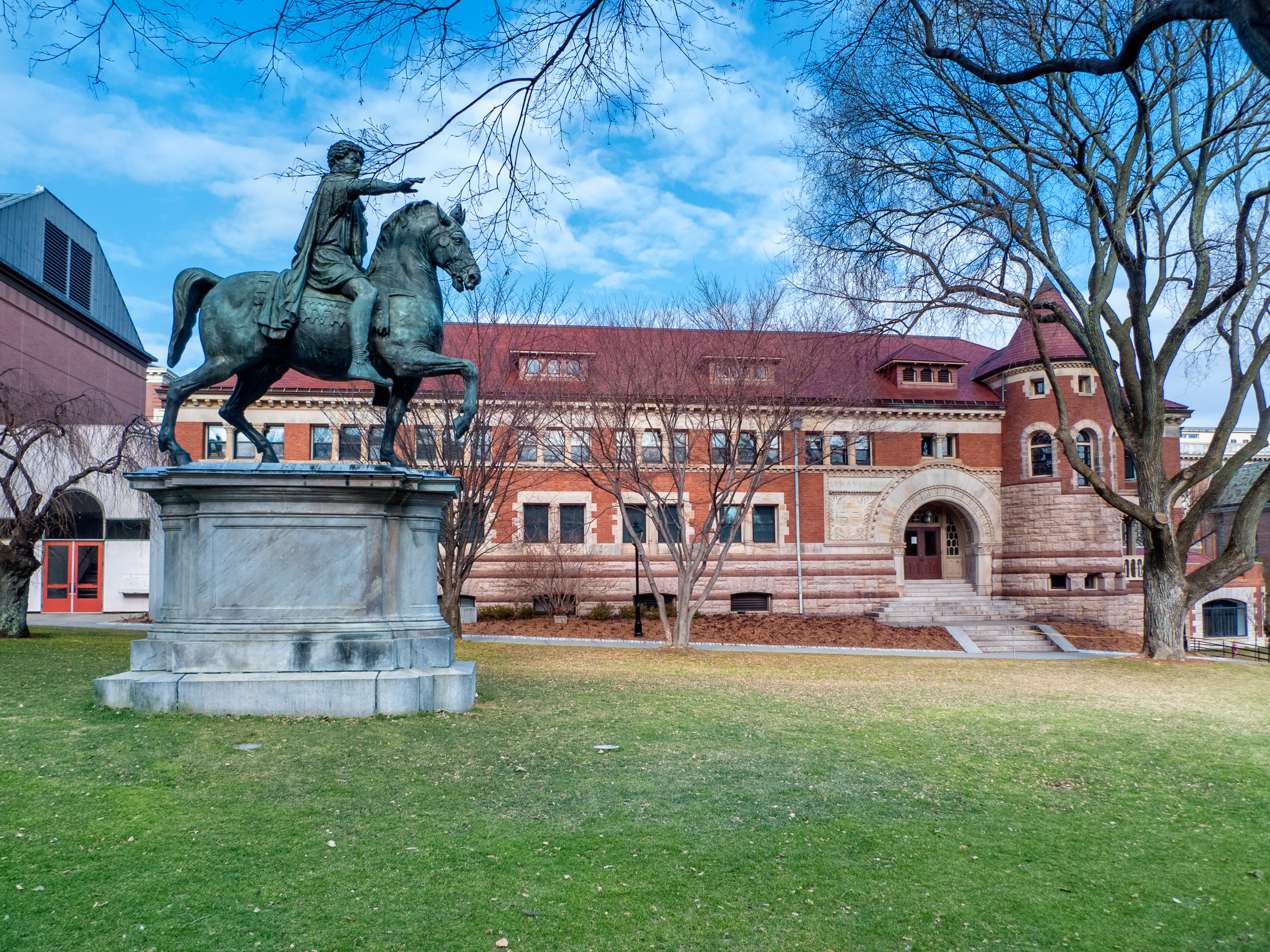
Lyman Hall, Brown University, 1889

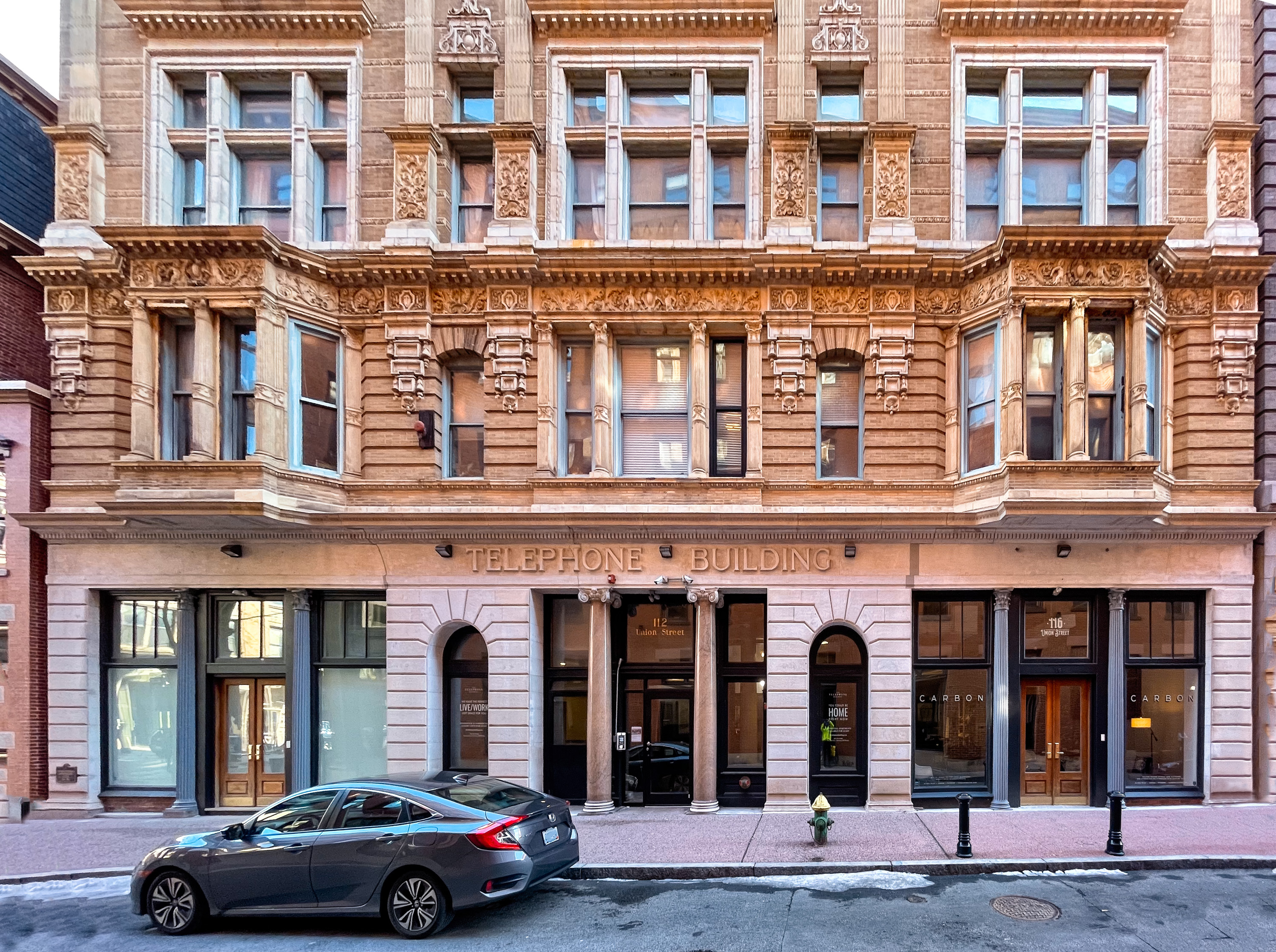
Telephone Building, Providence, 1893

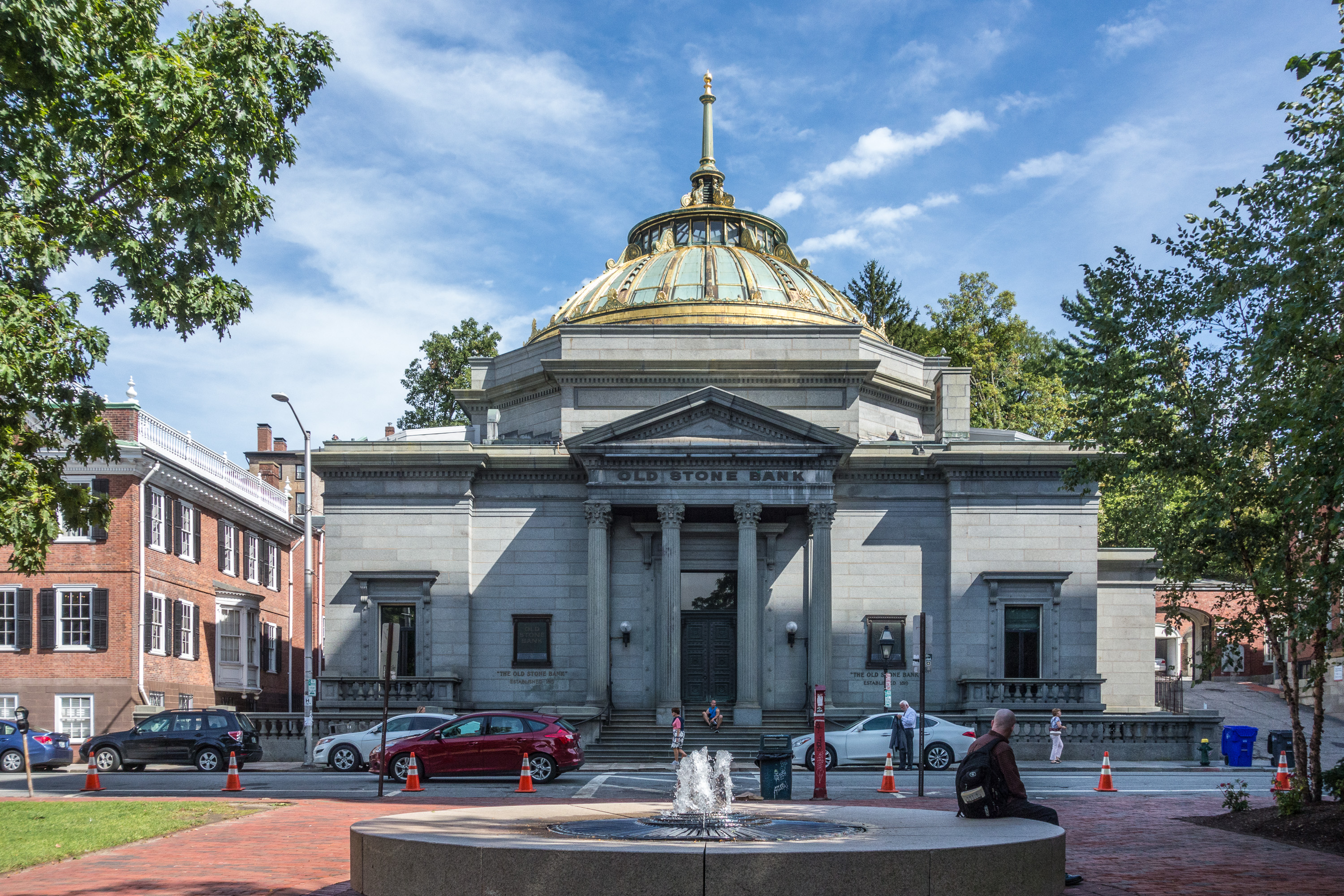
Old Stone Bank, Providence, 1896

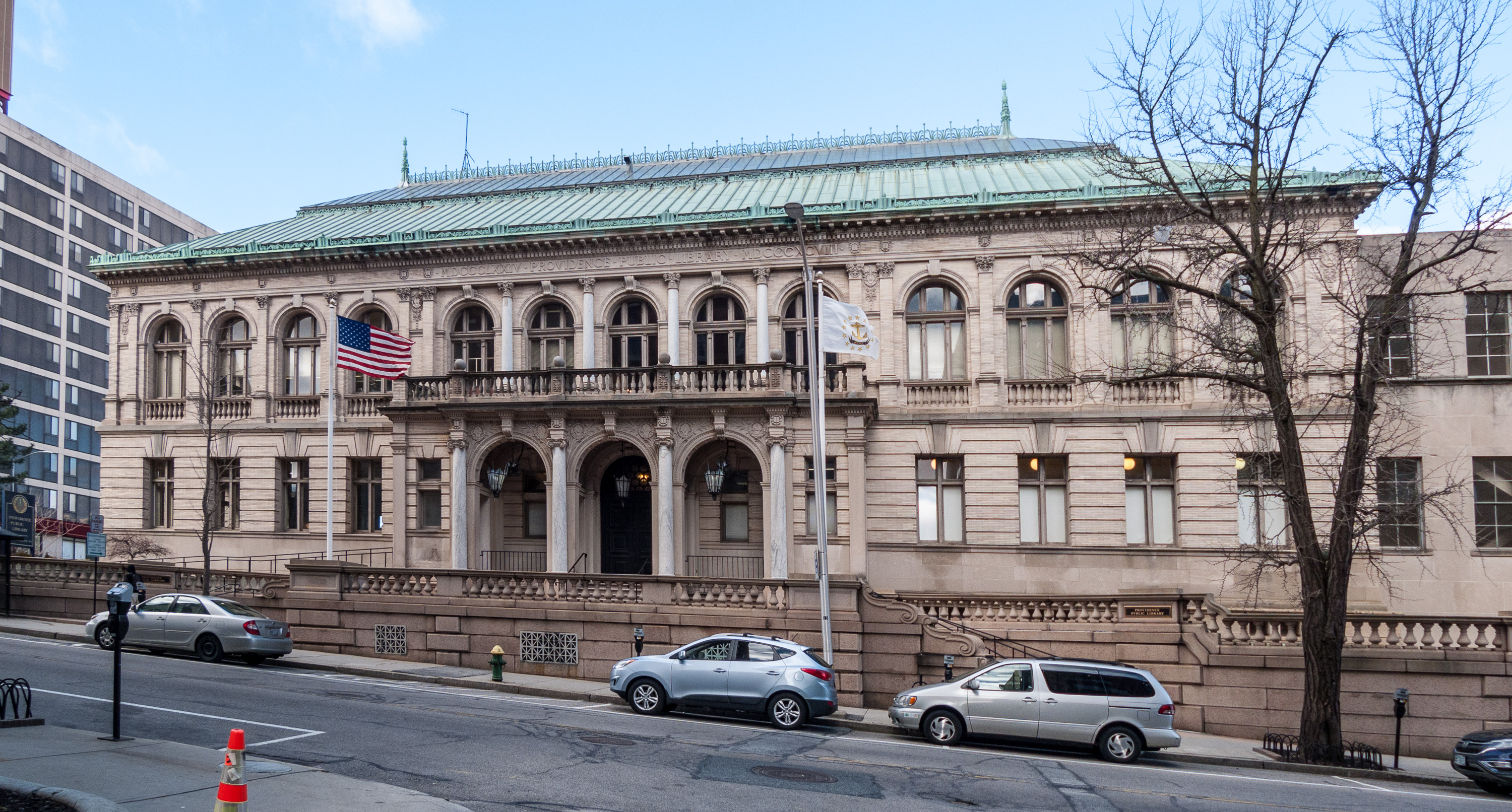
Providence Public Library, Providence, 1896

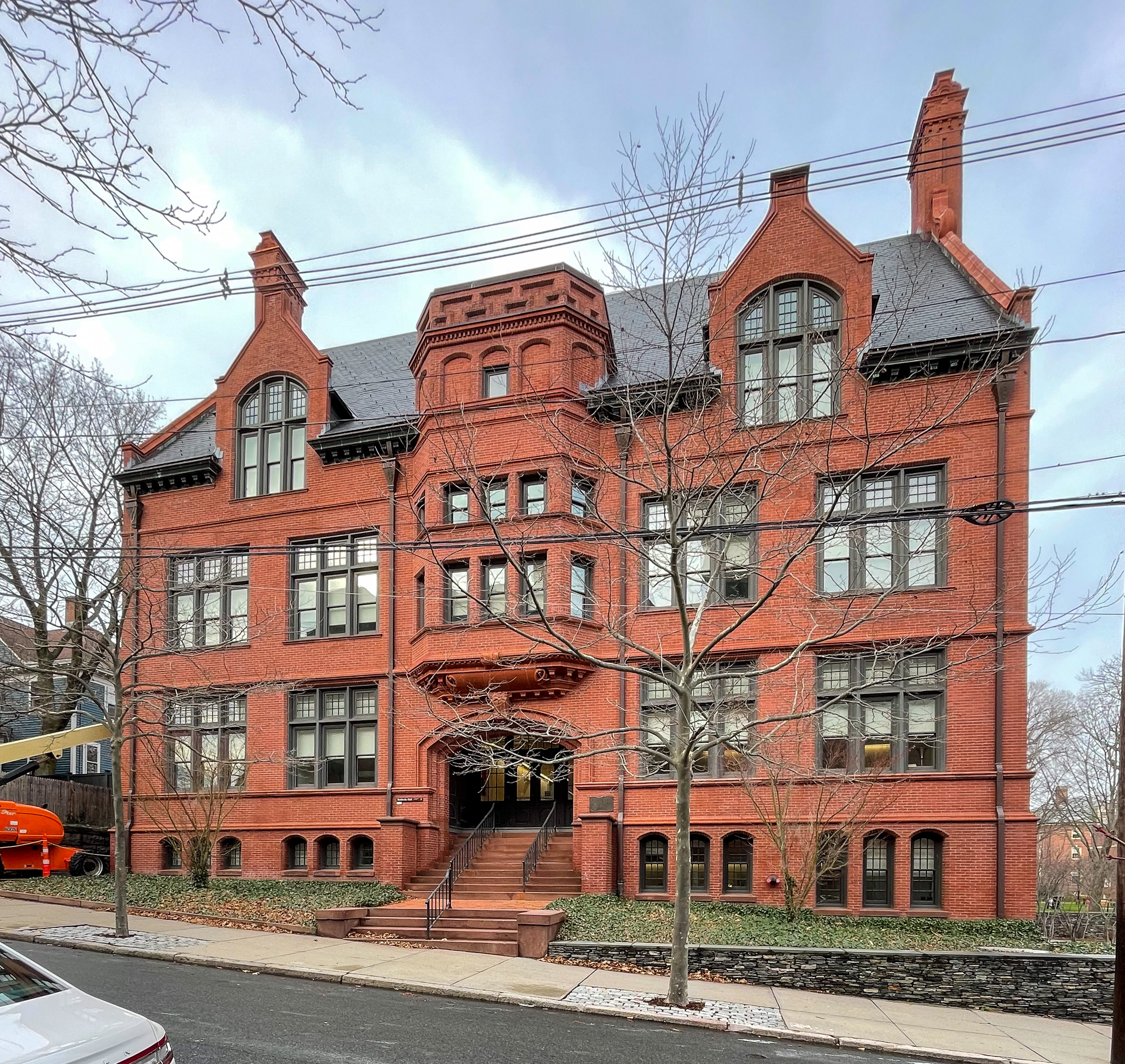
Pembroke Hall, Pembroke College, 1897

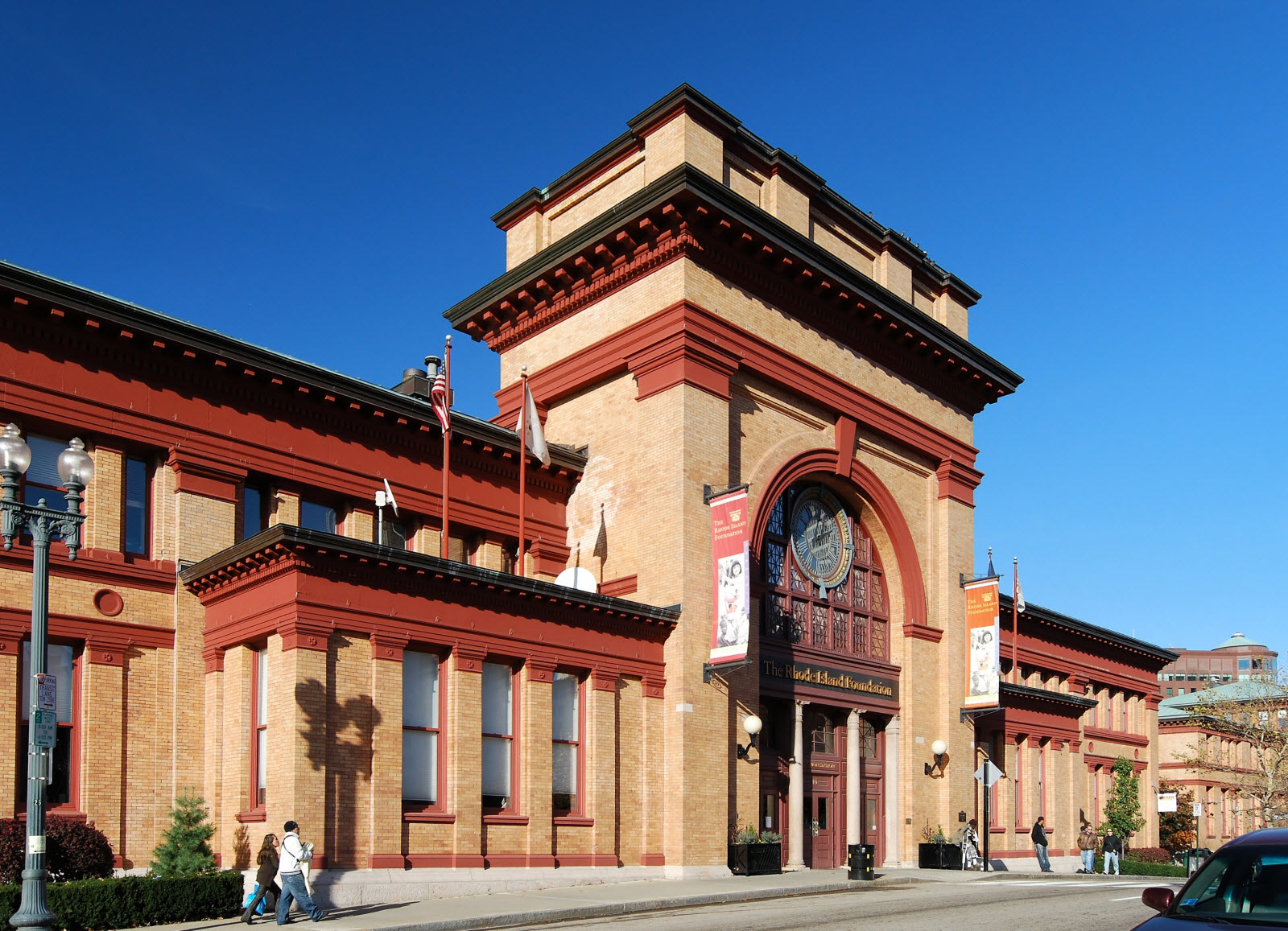
Union Station, Providence, 1896

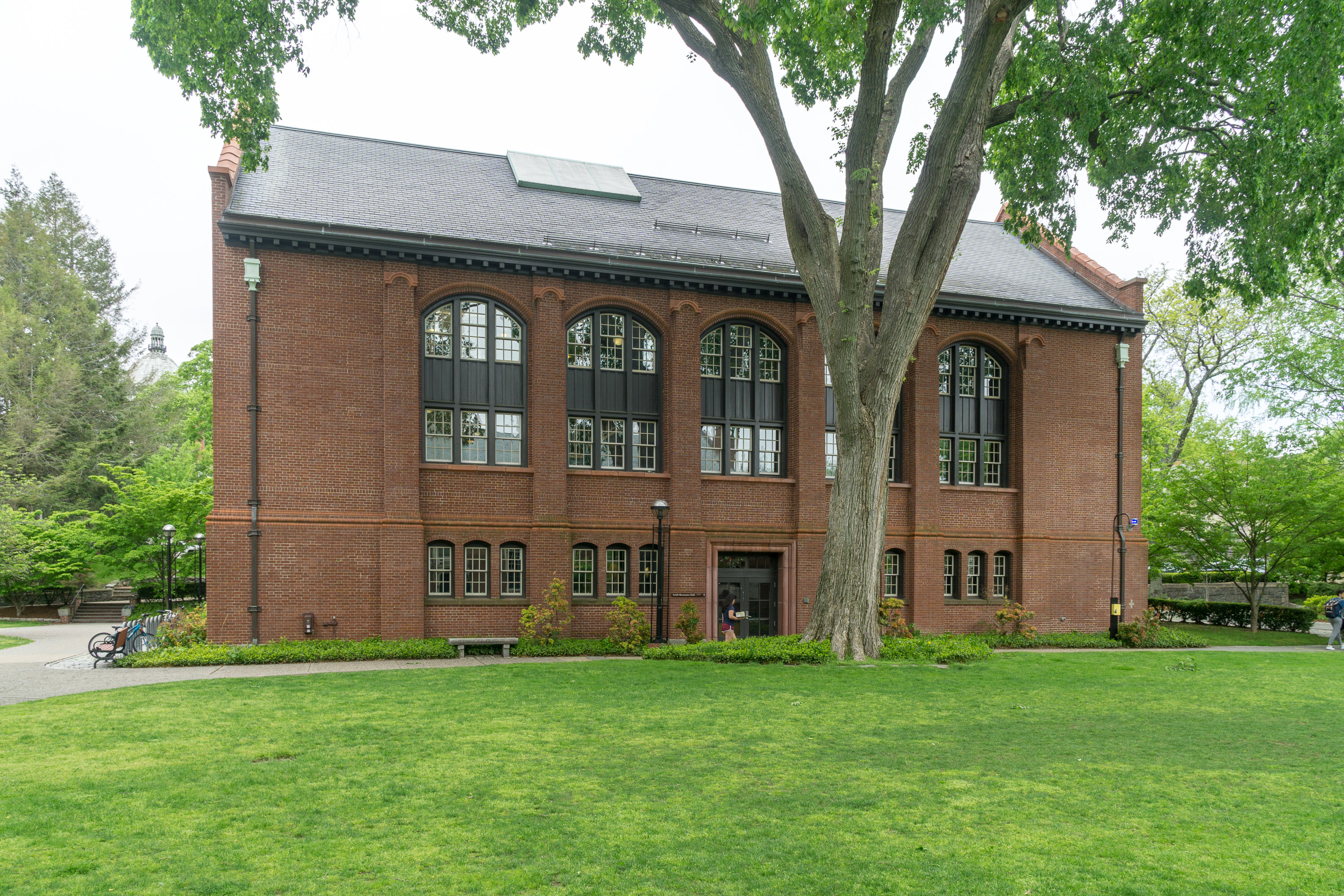
Sayles Gymnasium, now Smith-Buonanno Hall, Pembroke College, 1907

== Associated architects and draftsmen ==
- John Hutchins Cady
- Walter F. Fontaine
- George Frederic Hall
- Norman M. Isham
- Frank H. Martin
