= Power Street–Cooke Street Historic District =

Historic district in Rhode Island, United States

- U.S. National Register of Historic Places
- U.S. Historic district
- Location within Rhode Island Location within the United States
- Location: Providence, Rhode Island
- Coordinates: 41°49′33″N 71°23′42″W
- Architect: Stone, Carpenter & Sheldon; et al.
- Architectural style: Late 19th And 20th Century Revivals, Greek Revival, Late Victorian
- NRHP reference No.: 74002345
- Added to NRHP: July 30, 1974

The Power Street–Cooke Street Historic District is a residential historic district on the East Side of Providence, Rhode Island. Located east of Brown University, the area is compact area developed in the mid-to-late 19th century as a residential district, with a cross-section of architectural styles from the early 19th to the early 20th century. The district is bounded on the north by Angell Street, on the east by Governor Street, on the south by Power Street, and on the west by Hope Street. Cooke Street is the main thorough fare running through the center of the district, which is six blocks long and two wide. The district abuts the Stimson Avenue Historic District, which lies immediately to its west.

The district was listed on the National Register of Historic Places in 1974.

== See also ==
- National Register of Historic Places listings in Providence, Rhode Island
