= Israel B. Mason House =

Historic house in Rhode Island, United States

- U.S. National Register of Historic Places
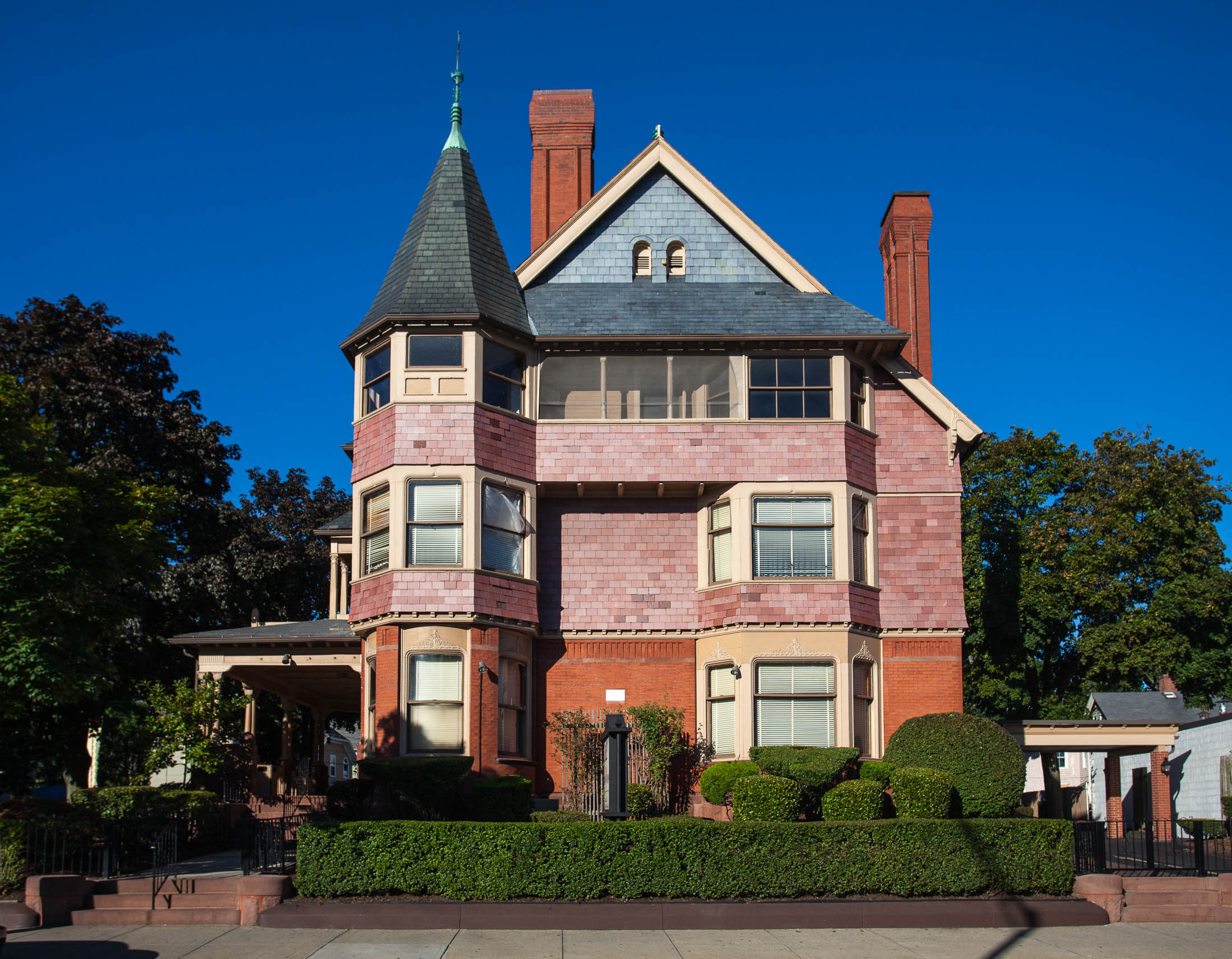

- Location within Rhode Island Location within the United States
- Location: Providence, Rhode Island
- Coordinates: 41°48′31″N 71°25′16″W
- Built: 1888
- Architect: Stone, Carpenter & Willson
- Architectural style: Queen Anne
- NRHP reference No.: 77000001
- Added to NRHP: August 16, 1977

The Israel B. Mason House is an historic house at 571 Broad Street in Providence, Rhode Island. It is a 2 1/2-story wood-frame structure, built in 1888 for Israel Bowen Mason, a wealthy merchant. It is one of the city's finest Queen Anne residences, with a visually complex assortment of projecting bays, verandas, turrets and gables. Particularly of note are its eastern porch and three-story octagonal tower. The house was designed by Stone, Carpenter & Willson, a prominent local architecture firm, for Mason, a self-made successful wholesaler of grocery and meat products. The house now houses a funeral home.

The house was listed on the National Register of Historic Places in 1977.

== See also ==
- National Register of Historic Places listings in Providence, Rhode Island
