= Bridge Mill Power Plant =

- U.S. National Register of Historic Places
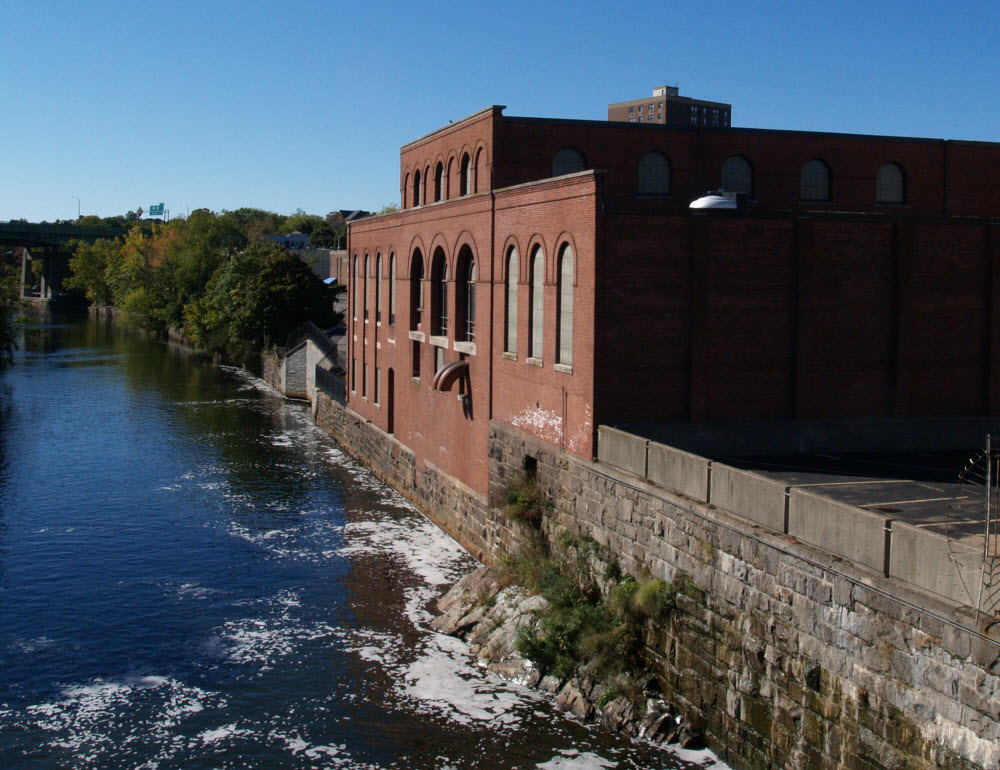

- Location within Rhode Island Location within the United States
- Location: Pawtucket, Rhode Island
- Coordinates: 41.8760°N 71.3840°W
- Built: 1893
- Architect: Stone, Carpenter & Willson
- MPS: Pawtucket MRA
- NRHP reference No.: 83003805
- Added to NRHP: November 18, 1983

The Bridge Mill Power Plant is a historic hydroelectric plant situated at 25 Roosevelt Avenue in Pawtucket, Rhode Island, United States. The plant is housed in a red brick building with sections ranging from two to three stories in height, located on the west bank of the Seekonk River. A notable feature of the site is an ashlar granite retaining wall, which hides the conduit that channels water from the Pawtucket Falls Dam to the facility.

The power plant is composed of three primary sections: the gatehouse, which regulates the water flow into the powerhouse, where five turbines were originally installed; and the boiler house, which contained a steam generation system used when water levels were insufficient for hydroelectric power production. Constructed in 1893, the Bridge Mill Power Plant is considered one of the best-preserved 19th-century hydroelectric stations in Rhode Island.

Due to its historical significance, the plant was listed on the National Register of Historic Places in 1983.

== See also ==
- National Register of Historic Places listings in Pawtucket, Rhode Island
