= Christopher Rhodes Greene House =

Historic house in Rhode Island, United States

- U.S. National Register of Historic Places
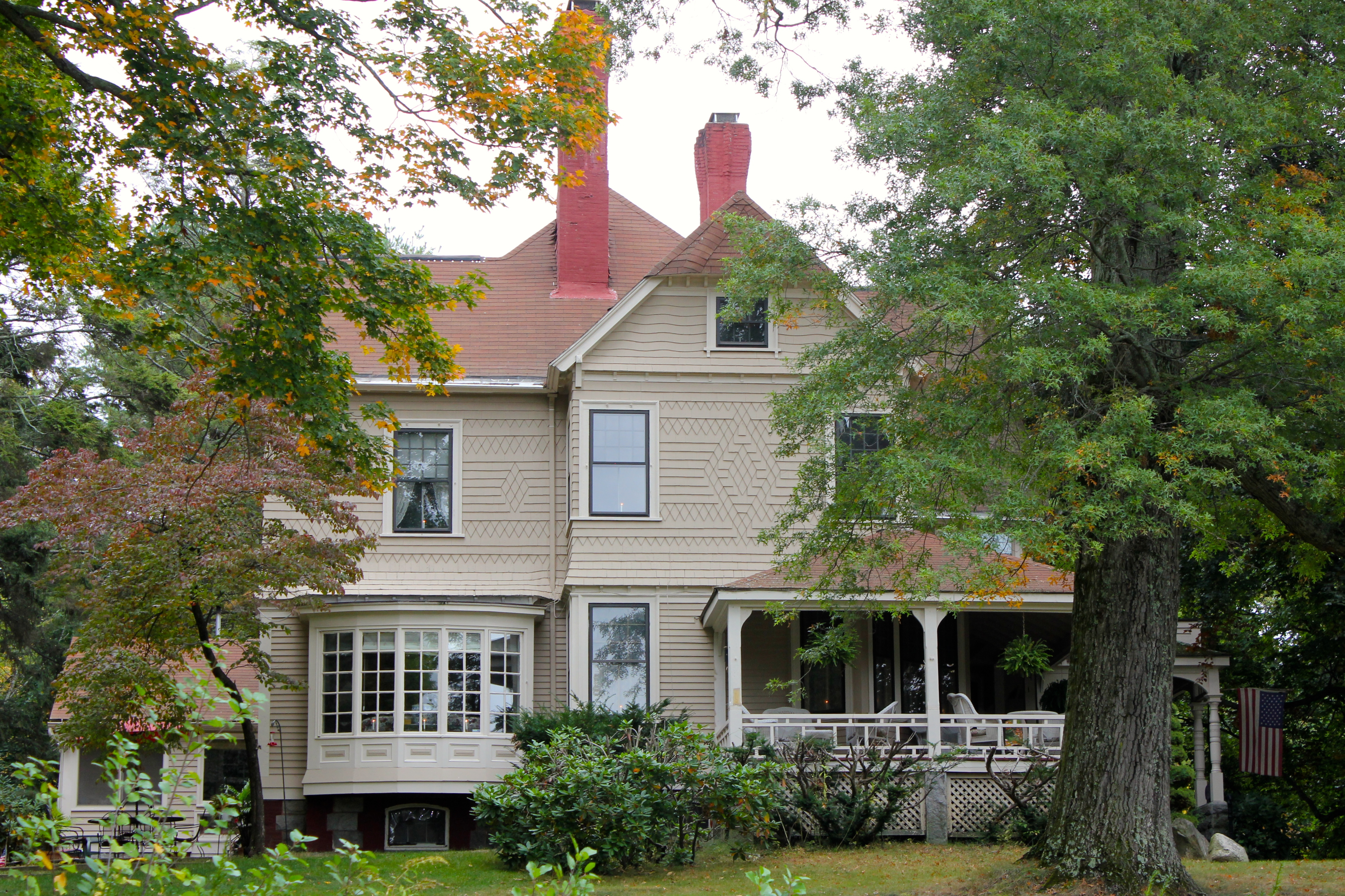
- Photo taken from State Route 115, Main Street

- Location within Rhode Island Location within the United States
- Location: 2 Potter Court, Coventry, Rhode Island
- Coordinates: 41°43′49″N 71°32′25″W
- Area: 1.5 acres (0.61 ha)
- Built: 1883
- Architect: Stone & Carpenter
- Architectural style: Queen Anne
- NRHP reference No.: 07000891
- Added to NRHP: August 30, 2007

The Christopher Rhodes Greene House is a historic house at 2 Potter Court in Coventry, Rhode Island. The 2 1/2-story house, with a matching stable, was designed by the Providence firm of Stone & Carpenter, and built in 1883 for Christopher Rhodes Greene, one of the owners of the Clyde Bleach and Print Works, located about 1 mile (1.6 km) away on the Pawtuxet River. The house features the irregular massing with numerous projections and window shapes and sizes, and a wraparound porch with porte-cochere. The exterior is sheathed predominantly in wood clapboards on the lower level, and shingles cut in a variety of shapes on the upper levels. The main, south-facing, gable peak has more elaborate siding, along with false half-timbering and a medallion.

The house was listed on the National Register of Historic Places in 2007.

== See also ==
- National Register of Historic Places listings in Kent County, Rhode Island
