= Hay and Owen Buildings =

- U.S. National Register of Historic Places
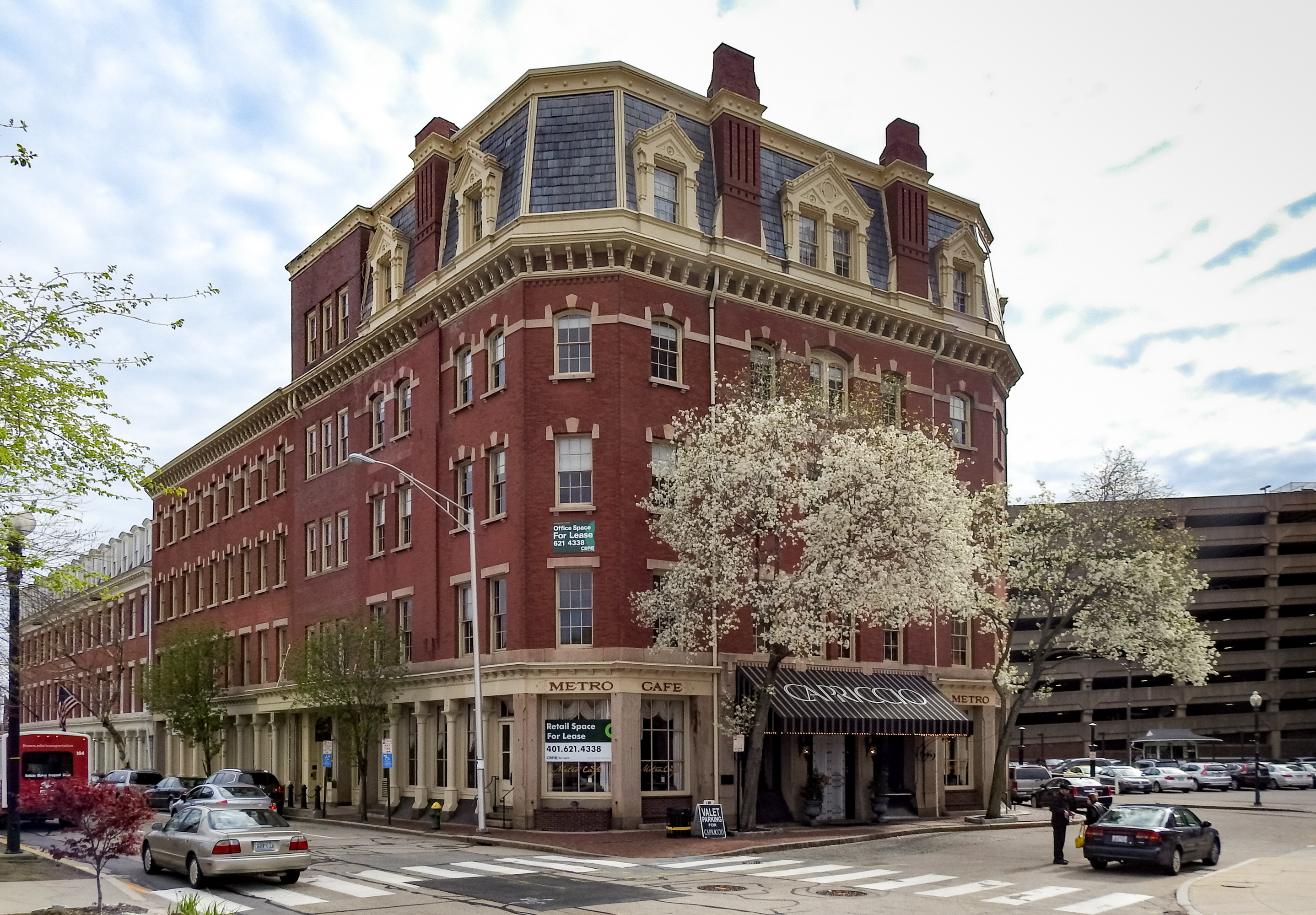
- Owen Building

- Location within Rhode Island Location within the United States
- Location: 101 and 117–135 Dyer Street, Providence, Rhode Island
- Coordinates: 41°49′24″N 71°24′33″W
- Built: 1866; 1867
- Architect: James C. Bucklin; Alfred Stone; Stone & Carpenter
- Architectural style: Second Empire
- NRHP reference No.: 82001859
- Added to NRHP: November 12, 1982

The Hay and Owen Buildings are a pair of historic commercial buildings in Providence, Rhode Island, United States.

The Owen Building (101 Dyer Street) was built in 1866 as two buildings, with a narrow alley running between them. They were designed by Alfred Stone for George and Smith Owen (G. & S. Owen), whose sons operated a wholesale yarn business on the premises. In 1877 Stone, as Stone & Carpenter, returned to remodel the buildings. The southern part, a four-story, nine-bay building, remained as it was built in 1866. In contrast, the northern part was radically changed. It was extended to meet the southern part, and a new fifth floor was added. A great deal of new ornamentation was also added at this time. Thus, the plural Owen Buildings became the Owen Building. The two parts originally met in the same way on both the east and west elevations. The original design remains on the west, but the east side was filled in with a flat brick wall sometime between 1918 and 1937.

The Hay Building (117-135 Dyer Street) is a four-story structure, built in 1867 for Alexander Duncan, as a speculative business venture. It was designed by James C. Bucklin. The Hay Building was formerly the Hay Buildings, as a matching structure once stood on the parking lot behind the building. Despite its mansard roof, the otherwise plain design of the building recalls Bucklin's earlier Greek Revival designs.

The two buildings are survivors of the era when the Weybosset Hill area was a center of Providence's commercial port.

The buildings were listed on the National Register of Historic Places in 1982.

== Gallery ==
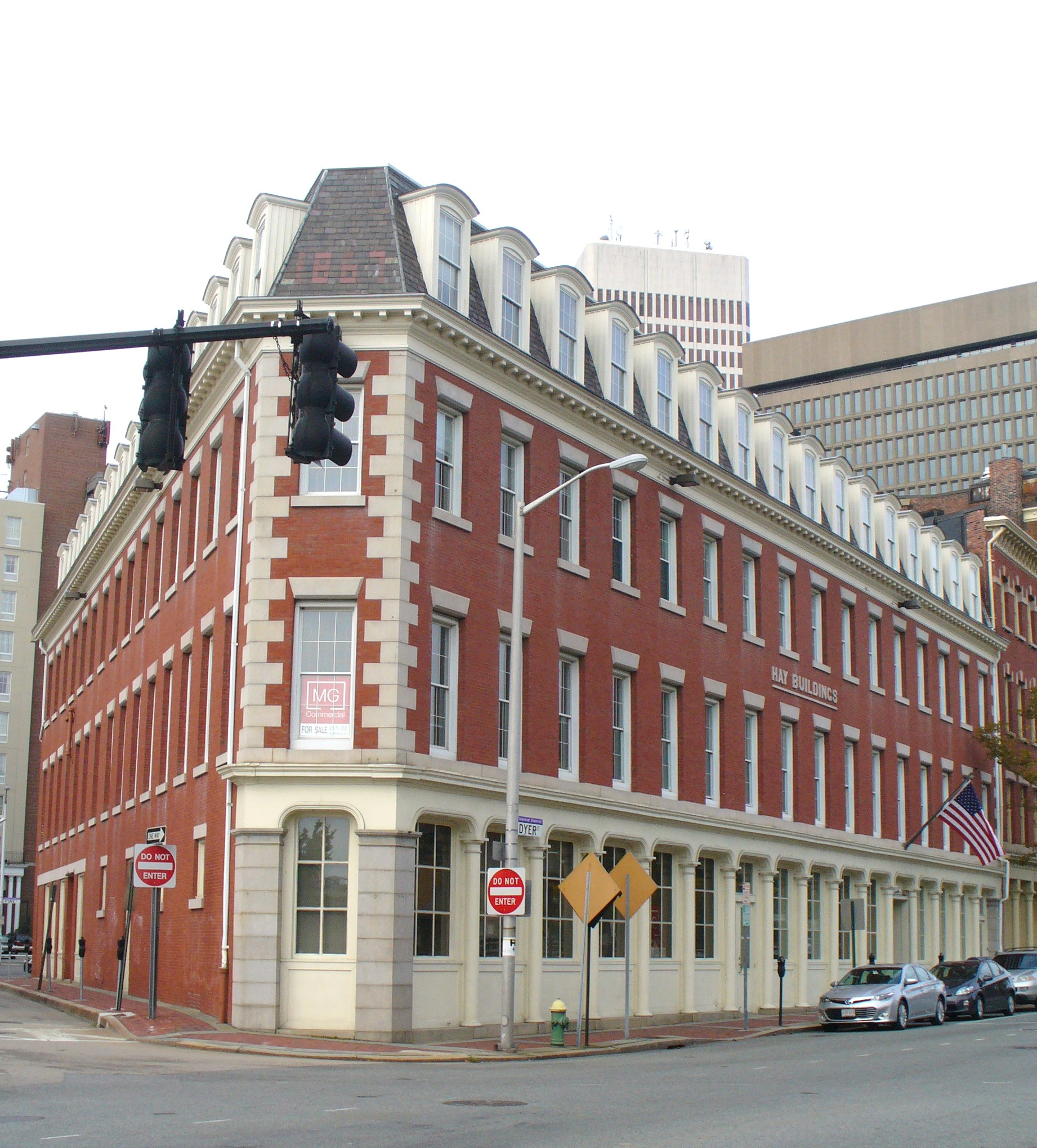
Hay Buildings

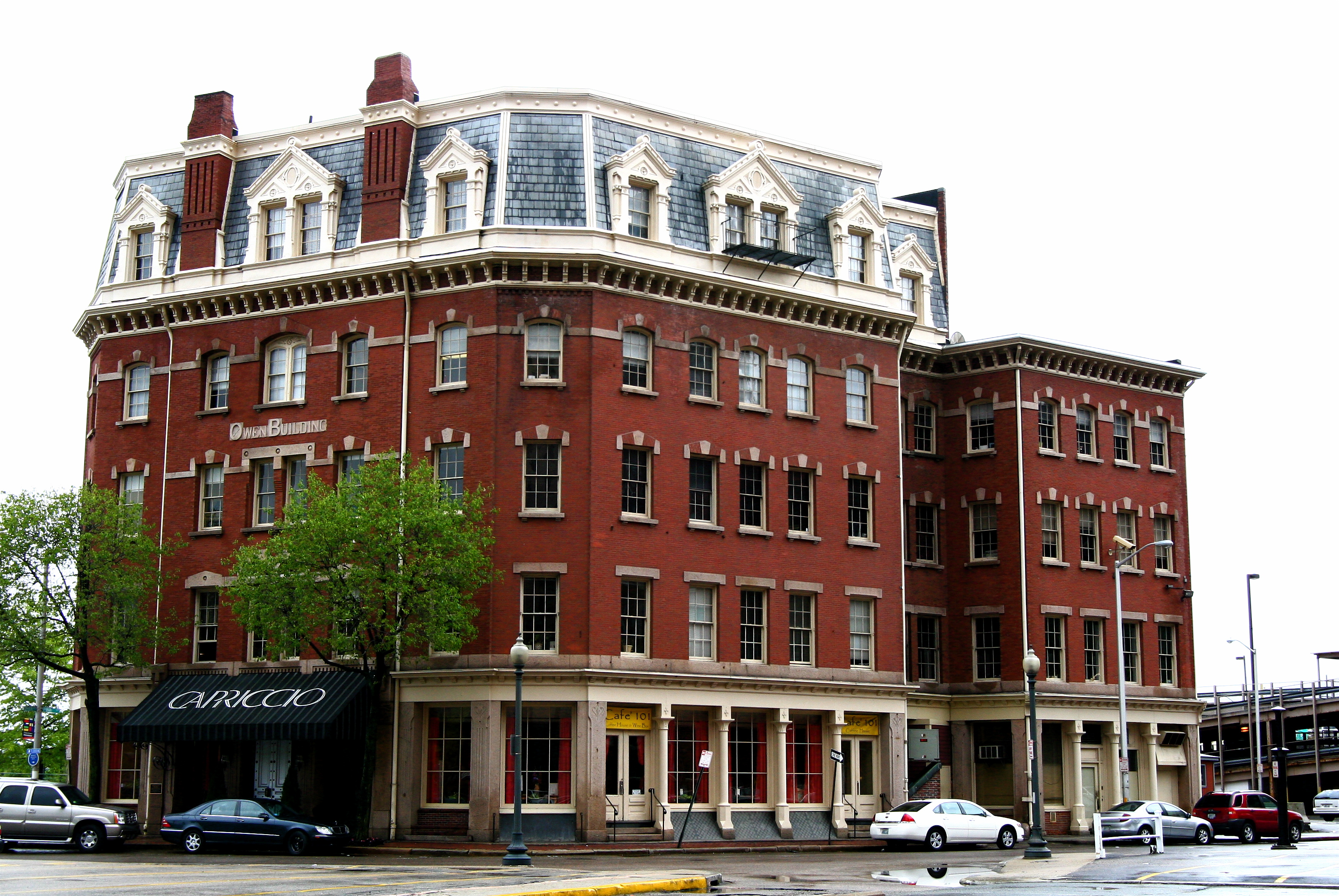
The Owen Building

== See also ==
- National Register of Historic Places in Providence, Rhode Island
