= Blackstone Boulevard–Cole Avenue–Grotto Avenue Historic District =

Historic district in Rhode Island, United States

- U.S. National Register of Historic Places
- U.S. Historic district
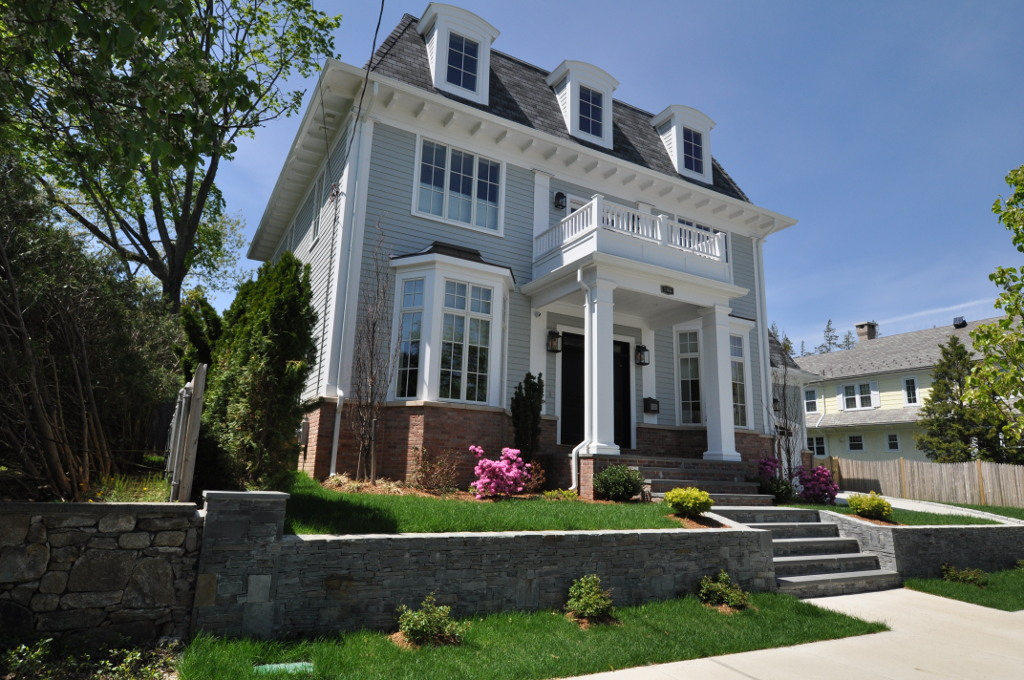

- Location within Rhode Island Location within the United States
- Location: Roughly bounded by Blackstone Blvd., Cole Ave., Grotto Ave., President and Rochambeau Aves., Providence, Rhode Island
- Coordinates: 41°50′21″N 71°23′9″W
- Area: 100 acres (40 ha)
- Built: 1855
- Architect: Albert Harkness et al.
- Architectural style: Late Victorian, Late 19th And 20th Century Revivals
- NRHP reference No.: 09000363
- Added to NRHP: November 12, 2009

The Blackstone Boulevard–Cole Avenue–Grotto Avenue Historic District is a predominantly residential historic district roughly bounded by Blackstone Boulevard, Cole Avenue, Grotto Avenue, President and Rochambeau Avenues on the east side of Providence, Rhode Island. It encompasses one of the last areas of the city be developed residentially. Covering about 100 acres (40 ha), most of its building stock was built between about 1889 and the 1940s, with a notable building spurt taking place in the 1920s. The architecture in the area is heterogeneous, with Colonial and Georgian Revival styles predominating. The area was developed after the city built Blackstone Boulevard with the intention of developing the area into a streetcar suburb.

The district was listed on the National Register of Historic Places in 2009.

== See also ==
- National Register of Historic Places listings in Providence, Rhode Island
