= Trinity Square Historic District =

- U.S. National Register of Historic Places
- U.S. Historic district
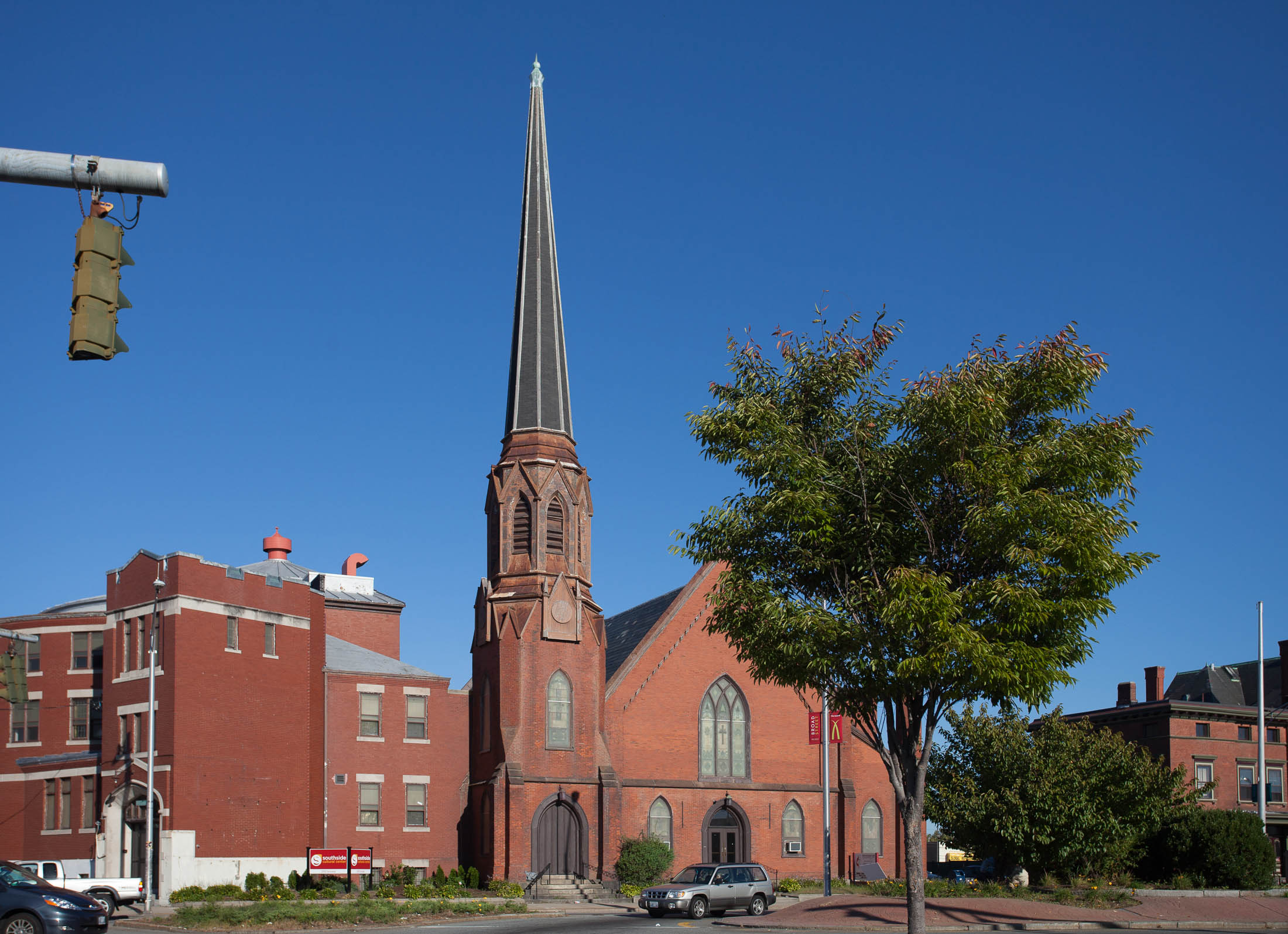
- Trinity United Methodist Church

- Location within Rhode Island Location within the United States
- Location: Providence, Rhode Island
- Coordinates: 41°48′44″N 71°25′24″W
- Area: 12 acres (4.9 ha)
- Built: 1856
- Architect: Multiple
- Architectural style: Gothic, Italianate, Queen Anne
- MPS: Elmwood MRA
- NRHP reference No.: 80000011
- Added to NRHP: January 7, 1980

The Trinity Square Historic District is a historic district in the Elmwood neighborhood of Providence, Rhode Island. It includes four properties on the south and west side of Trinity Square, the triangular junction of Elmwood Avenue and Broad Street. The visual focal points of the district are the Grace Church Cemetery, which is located south of the square, and the Trinity United Methodist Church, an imposing Gothic Revival structure built in the mid-1860s to a design by Clifton A. Hall. North of the church stands the Clifton Hall Duplex, designed and occupied by Hall, and the James Potter House, an elaborate Queen Anne mansion built c. 1889 and designed by Stone, Carpenter & Willson.

The district was listed on the National Register of Historic Places in 1980.

== Grace Church Cemetery ==
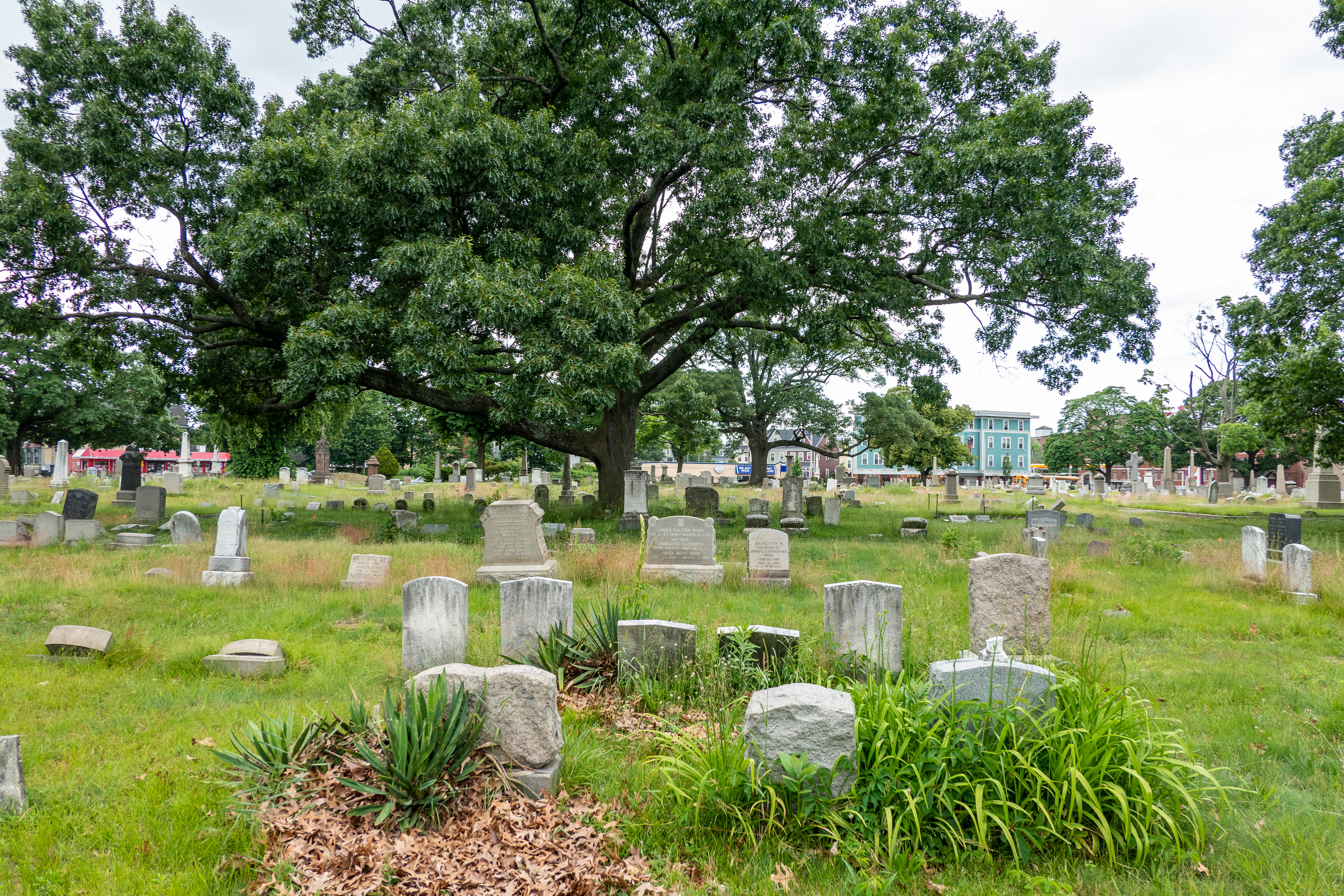
Grace Church Cemetery

Grace Church cemetery is a triangular parcel of land located at the intersection of Broad Street and Elmwood Avenue. The church purchased four acres here in 1834, and doubled its size in 1843. A caretaker's cottage was built 1859-1860 in the Gothic Revival/Carpenter Gothic style. The cottage, included in the Providence Landmark District, has been maintained over the years: 1982, 2008, and again in 2010.

The cemetery holds approximately 9000 graves, including many members of Grace Church including its rector and the first Episcopal Bishop of Rhode Island, John Prentiss Kewley Henshaw, as well as nationally prominent architect Russell Warren who was a member of the church and architect of the first Grace Church (1828). It is likely he designed this cemetery, chartered in 1834, as well as the two key buildings that serve it: the Greek Revival Granite Storage Crypt (c. 1850) as well as the Carpenter Gothic Gatekeeper's House (c. 1859). It was described in the plans for the cemetery in the original charter plan.

It has been listed as one of Rhode Island's "most endangered properties" by the Providence Preservation Society for several years. It is a frequent target of vandalism, with many toppled and broken gravestones.

Recently, the unmarked graves of soprano Matilda Sissieretta Joyner Jones, as well as her mother were located and marked with a granite gravestone by Warren Monument Company.

More information on Grace Church Cemetery can be found at www.gracechurchcemeteryri.org.

== See also ==
- National Register of Historic Places listings in Providence, Rhode Island
