= Tyehimba Jess =

American poet

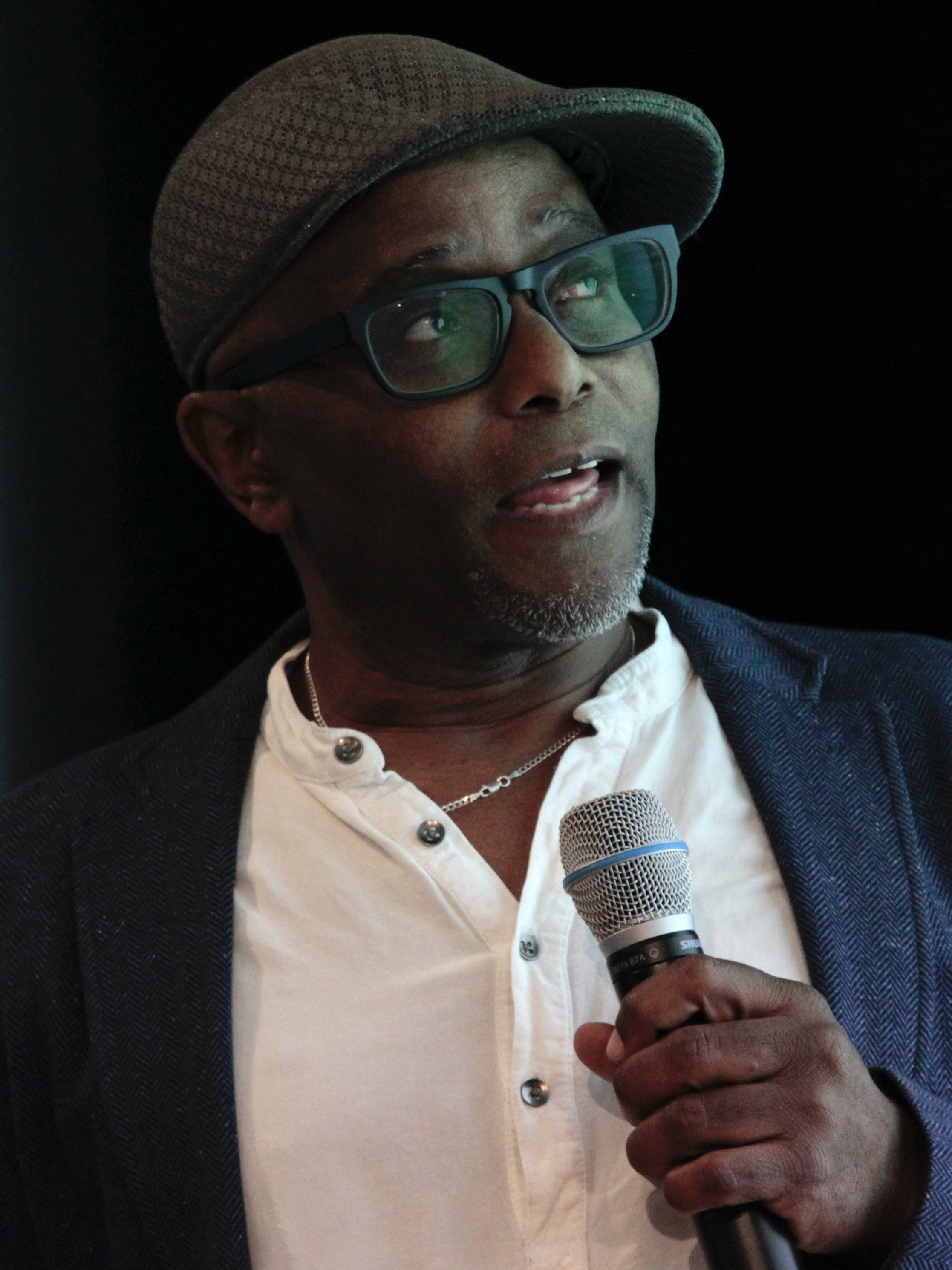
- Jess in 2023
- Born: 1965 (age 60–61); Detroit, Michigan, U.S.
- Education: University of Chicago (BA); New York University (MFA)
- Occupations: Poet, teacher
- Writing career
- Years active: 1992–present
- Notable work: Olio (2016)
- Notable awards: Pulitzer Prize in Poetry
- Website: www.tyehimbajess.net

Tyehimba Jess (born 1965 in Detroit) is an American poet. His book Olio received the 2017 Pulitzer Prize for Poetry.

== Biography ==
=== Early life ===
Tyehimba Jess was born Jesse S. Goodwin. He grew up in Detroit, where his father worked in that city's Department of Health. His father later became the first vice president of Detroit's chapter of the National Association for the Advancement of Colored People (NAACP). Jess's mother was a teacher and nurse, who founded a nursing school at Wayne County Community College in 1972.

According to Jess, he started writing poetry at age 16. Within just a few years, when he was 18, he had won second prize for poetry at an NAACP academic competition. He graduated from high school in 1984. Next, he enrolled at the University of Chicago, where he intended to be an English major and pursue his poetry writing. However, he soon abandoned this as an option, and dropped out of the university in 1987. During this time, to support himself, Jess worked as an intern at a bank, as a community organizer, and as substitute teacher in the public school system in Chicago.

In 1989, he returned to the University of Chicago, and switched his major to Public Policy. Around the same time, he began to take classes at nearby University of Illinois at Chicago (UIC) with the poet and scholar Sterling D. Plumpp, who became a mentor, and he realized that his real passion was for poetry. Plumpp's classes focused on literary figures from the Harlem Renaissance and the Black Arts Movement of the 1960s and 1970s, which inspired him to start writing again. He graduated from the University of Chicago in 1991, with a BA degree in Public Policy. He later pursued an MFA degree at New York University, which he received in 2004.

=== Career ===
As of 2017, Jess teaches poetry and fiction as an associate professor of English at the College of Staten Island of the City University of New York. He is a faculty member of The Watering Hole Organization, and is also the faculty adviser for Caesura, the college's literary arts magazine.

Jess's first book of poetry, leadbelly (Wave Books, 2005), was chosen by Brigit Pegeen Kelly as a winner in the 2004 National Poetry Series competition. Library Journal and Black Issues Book Review both named it one of the "Best Poetry Books of 2005".

In April 2016, Jess released his second full-length poetry collection, titled Olio. This work has been described as "part fact, part fiction….sonnet, song and narrative to examine the lives of mostly unrecorded AfricanAmerican performers…." In his book he writes some poems in reference to Edmonia Lewis, John William Boone, Henry Box Brown, Paul Laurence Dunbar, Fisk Jubilee Singers, Ernest Hogan, Sissieretta Jones, Scott Joplin, Millie and Christine McKoy, Booker T. Washington, Blind Tom Wiggins, Bert Williams and George Walker.

Jess's work has appeared in Soul Fires: Young Black Men on Love and Violence, Obsidian III: Literature in the African Diaspora, Power Lines: Ten Years of Poetry from Chicago's Guild Complex, and Slam: The Art of Performance Poetry.

== Works ==
=== Inspiration ===
Jess's inspiration for writing stems from his drive to express history through expression and performance.

"In Tyehimba Jess's Olio, a new book length performance of poetry, song, collage and art object, musical knowledge is channeled back to its source—before the wax cylinders of antiquated recording technology, before Alan Lomax and W.C. Handy, to the 19th century of black musicians. Jess's poetic concentration is so absolute, dithyrambic, multimodal, encyclopedic, that it defies categorization as much as the early music of gospel singers and jazz pioneers, blues artists and vaudeville performers he describes and celebrates. History as song; as expression; as freedom. That is, a living history that follows the great migration of African-Americans between the Civil War and World War I who undertook journeys across thousands of miles as well as musical history. The result is one of the most profound portraits I know of how artists have redefined their very being in the world."

"Jess, though an author who has a voice that cannot be mistaken, acts more as a gentle tour guide through a period of black artistry that is often represented differently than it is here."

=== Poetry ===
- "When I Speak of Blues Be Clear", Cave Canem
- "out". Ploughshares. Spring 2002. Archived from the original on August 20, 2006.
- "freedom". Ploughshares. Spring 2002. Archived from the original on August 20, 2006.
- "martha promise receives leadbelly, 1935", Poetry Foundation
- "harris county chain gang"; "home again"; "martha promise receives leadbelly, 1935", Perihelion
- Leadbelly. Verse Press. 2005. ISBN 978-0-9746353-3-0.
- Olio. Wave Books. 2016. ISBN 978-1-940696-22-5. OCLC 1004655645

=== Anthologies ===
- Soulfires: Young Black Men in Love and Violence (1996). ISBN 9780140242157, OCLC 32819872
- Slam: The Competitive Art of Performance Poetry (2000). ISBN 9780916397661, OCLC 44131613
- Dark Matter 2: Reading the Bones (2004). ISBN 9780446693776, OCLC 57576047

=== Non-fiction ===
- African American Pride: Celebrating Our Achievements, Contributions, and Enduring Legacy. Citadel Press. 2003. ISBN 978-0-8065-2498-6. "Tyehimba Jess."
- "Ancestral Wealth – The Sacred Black Masculine in My Life", Boston Review, February 5, 2021.

== Awards ==
- 2000: Duncan YMCA Writer's Voice Fellow
- Illinois Arts Council Artist Roster
- 2000: Illinois Arts Council Artist Fellowship
- 2001: Chicago Sun Times Poetry Award
- 2001: Gwendolyn Brooks Open Mic Poetry Awards
- 2001–2002: Ragdale Fellow
- 2004: National Poetry Series
- 2004: NEA grant
- 2006: Whiting Award
- 2007: Lannan residency
- 2017: Pulitzer Prize for Poetry
- 2017: Anisfield-Wolf Book Award
- 2017: Kate Tufts Discovery Award: Finalists for Olio
