= Scott Lapham =

Artist, photojournalist, activist

- Known for: photography, sculpture
- Website: scottlaphamprojects.format.com

Scott Lapham is an artist, activist and photojournalist living and working in Providence, Rhode Island. He was described as a "longtime pillar of the AS220 universe" by The Phoenix.

Raised in Massachusetts, Lapham is an alum of the Rhode Island School of Design. Lapham, as a resident, employee and staff member and teacher was the founder of the Photographic Memory program at AS220. His work has been featured in the NetWorks Rhode Island art series, Providence Preservation Society's Most Endangered Properties program and Slater Mill.

He is the founder and director of the youth program One Gun Gone. He created the program following the deaths of four of his teenage students by gun violence.
