= Olio (poetry collection) =

2016 poetry collection by Tyehimba Jess

- Author: Tyehimba Jess
- Language: English
- Genre: Poetry
- Publisher: Seattle Wave Books
- Publication date: 2016
- Pages: 235
- ISBN: 978-1-940696-22-5 (Hardcover)
- OCLC: 1004655645

Olio is a book of poetry written by Tyehimba Jess that was released in 2016. The book is split into 16 sections, 14 of which are poems with the introduction section and extras and acknowledgments acting as the beginning and ending sections, and illustrated by Jessica Lynne Brown. Olio won the 2017 Pulitzer Prize for Poetry.

== Purpose ==
Jess' purpose behind writing Olio was to put together the work of first-generation freed slaves to share their story and their suffering, as well as to create a piece of work that each reader will experience differently.

"Fix your eyes on the flex of these first-generation-freed voices: They coalesce in counterpoint, name nemeses, summon tongue to wit-ness. Weave your own chosen way between these voices". (Jess 3)

== Characters ==
- John William Boone (1864-1927)
- Henry Brown
- Paul Laurence Dunbar (1872-1906)
- The Fisk Jubilee Singers
- Ernest Hogan (1865–1909)
- Sissieretta Jones (1868–1933)
- Scott Joplin (1867–1917)
- Millie and Christine McKoy (1851–1912)
- Booker T. Washington (1856–1915)
- Tom Wiggins (1849–1908)
- Bert Williams and George Walker
- Edmonia Lewis (1844–1907)
