= Sissieretta Jones =

American soprano singer (1868–1933)

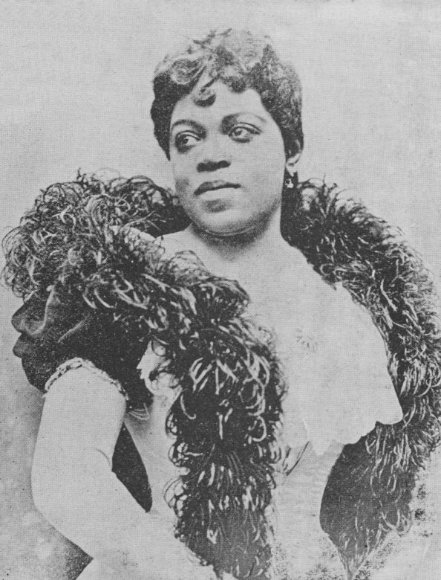
- Jones in 1897
- Born: Matilda Sissieretta Joyner; January 5, 1868 or 1869; Portsmouth, Virginia, U.S.
- Died: June 24, 1933 (aged 64–65); Providence, Rhode Island, U.S.
- Other name: The Black Patti
- Occupation: Soprano singer
- Years active: 1887–1915
- Spouse: David Richard Jones (m. 1883; div. 1899)

Matilda Sissieretta Joyner Jones (January 5, 1868 or 1869 – June 24, 1933) was an American soprano. She sometimes was called "The Black Patti" in reference to Italian opera singer Adelina Patti. Jones' repertoire included grand opera, light opera, and popular music. Trained at the Providence Academy of Music and the New England Conservatory of Music, Jones made her New York City debut in 1888 at Steinway Hall, and four years later she performed at the White House for President Benjamin Harrison. She sang for four consecutive presidents and the British royal family, and was met with international success. Besides the United States and the West Indies, Jones toured in South America, Australia, India, southern Africa, and Europe.

The highest-paid African American performer of her time, later in her career she founded the Black Patti Troubadours (later renamed the Black Patti Musical Comedy Company), a musical and acrobatic act made up of 40 jugglers, comedians, dancers and a chorus of 40 trained singers. She remained the star of the Famous Troubadours for around two decades while they established their popularity in the principal cities of the United States and Canada, Jones retired from performing in 1915. In 2013, she was inducted into the Rhode Island Music Hall of Fame.

== Early life ==
Matilda Sissieretta Joyner was born on January 5, 1868 or 1869, in a house on Bart Street in Portsmouth, Virginia, United States, to Jeremiah Malachi Joyner, an African Methodist Episcopal minister and Henrietta Beale, a singer in a church choir and washerwoman. Her father had formerly been enslaved, but was educated and literate. She was the oldest of three children, although her siblings died when they were young. Matilda Joyner was nicknamed as Sissy or Tilly by her family and friends, and began singing around the house at a young age. When she was six years old, her family moved to Providence, Rhode Island, where she began singing at an early age in her father's Pond Street Baptist Church. She attended Meeting Street and Thayer Schools.

In 1883, Joyner began the formal study of music at the Providence Academy of Music. She studied with Ada Baroness Lacombe. In the late 1880s, Jones was accepted at the New England Conservatory of Music in Boston, studying under Flora Batson of the Bergen Star Company. She also studied at the Boston Conservatory.

== Musical career ==
=== Debut and breakthrough concerts ===
On October 29, 1885, Jones gave a solo performance in Providence as an opening act to a production of Shakespeares's Richard III staged by John A. Arneaux's theatre troupe. In 1887, she performed at Boston's Music Hall before an audience of 5,000. Jones made her New York City debut on April 5, 1888, at Steinway Hall. During a performance at Wallack's Theater in New York, Jones came to the attention of Adelina Patti's manager, who recommended that Jones tour the West Indies with the Fisk Jubilee Singers. Jones made successful tours of the Caribbean in 1888 and 1892. Around this time one critic at the theatrical journal the New York Clipper dubbed her "the Black Patti" after Adelina Patti, an epithet that Jones disliked, preferring Madame Jones. She later told a reporter that the name "rather annoys me... I am afraid people will think I consider myself the equal to Patti herself. I assure you I don't think so, but I have a voice and I am striving to win the favor of the public by honest merit and hard work."

Jones in an 1889 poster

In February 1892, Jones performed at the White House for President Benjamin Harrison. She sang for four consecutive presidents—Harrison, Grover Cleveland, William McKinley, and Theodore Roosevelt—and the British royal family. For three of her White House performances, Jones had to enter the building through the back. She was finally allowed to enter through the front door for the Roosevelt performance.

Jones performed at the Grand Negro Jubilee at New York's Madison Square Garden in April 1892 before an audience of 75,000. She sang the song "Swanee River" and selections from Verdi's La traviata. She was so popular that she was invited to perform at the Pittsburgh Exposition (1892) and the World's Columbian Exposition in Chicago (1893). At the Chicago performance, the venue was packed an hour before she was set to perform, and she received an ovation after singing "Ocean, Thou Mighty Monster".

In June 1892, Jones became the first African American to sing at the Music Hall in New York (renamed Carnegie Hall the following year). Among the selections in her program were Gounod's "Ave Maria" and Verdi's "Sempre libera" from La traviata. The New York Echo wrote of her performance at the Music Hall: "If Mme Jones is not the equal of Adelina Patti, she at least can come nearer it than anything the American public has heard. Her notes are as clear as a mockingbird's and her annunciation is perfect."

=== Expanded venues and international success ===
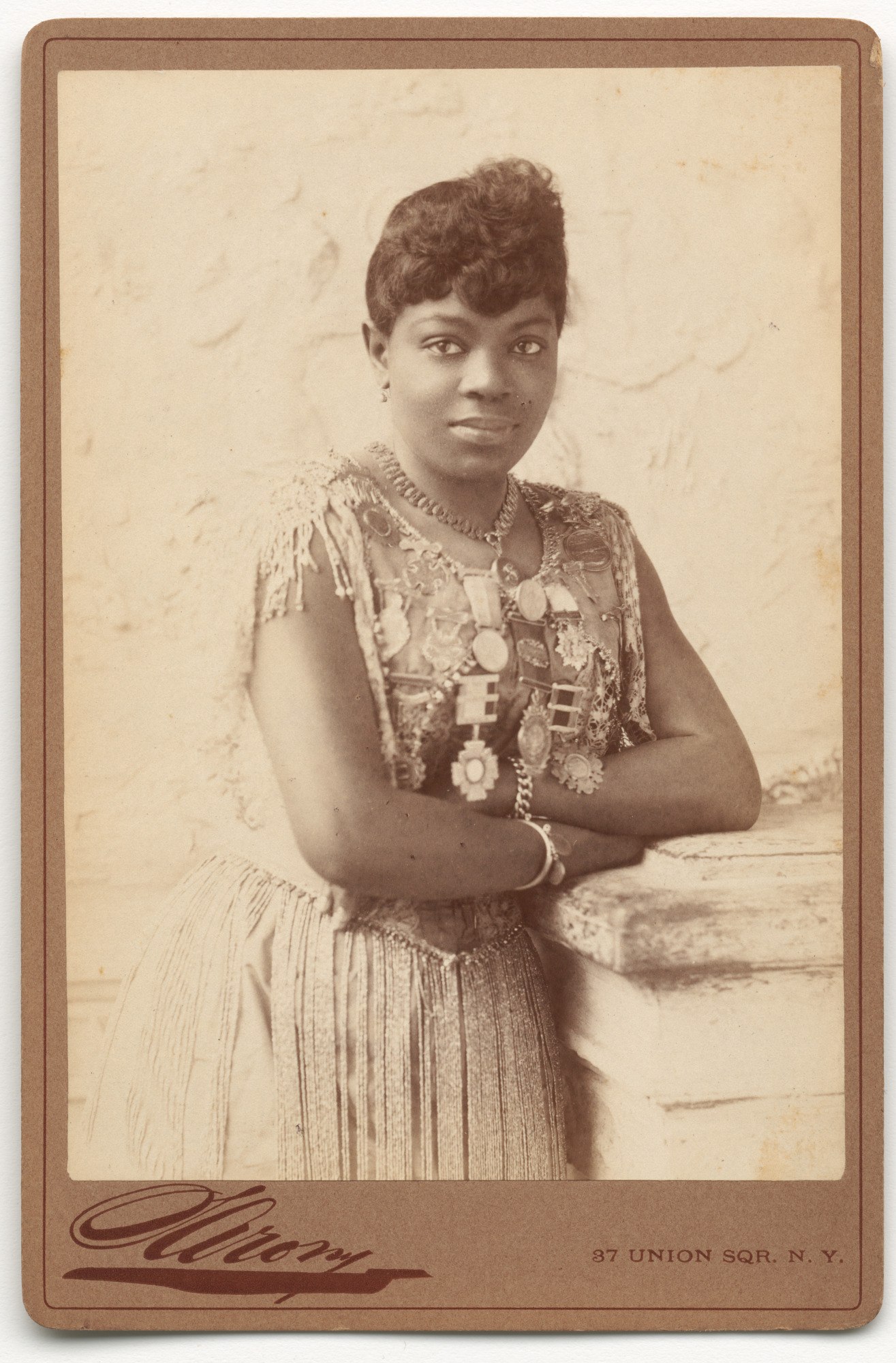
1895 photograph by Napoleon Sarony

On June 8, 1892, Jones' venue options expanded, and she entered a contract with the possibility of a two-year extension, for $150 per week (plus expenses) with Major James B. Pond, who had meaningful affiliations to many authors and musicians and also managed artists such as Mark Twain and Henry Ward Beecher, and her fees began to rise. She received $2,000 for a week-long appearance at the Pittsburgh Exposition, noted for being the highest fee ever paid to a black artist in the United States. By comparison, Adelina Patti was paid $4,000 a night.

In 1893, Jones met composer Antonín Dvořák. On January 23, 1894, Dvořák included Jones as a featured soloist during his benefit concert for the New York Herald's Free Clothing Fund at the Madison Square Garden Concert Hall. In addition to singing an arrangement of Rossini's Stabat Mater with the "colored male choir of St. Philip's church", Jones performed Dvořák's arrangement of Foster's "Old Folks at Home". By 1895, she had become the "most well known and highly paid" performer of African American heritage of her time.

Jones was met with international success. Besides the US and the West Indies, Jones toured in South America, Australia, India, and southern Africa. During a European tour in 1895 and 1896, Jones performed in London, Paris, Berlin, Cologne, Munich, Milan, and Saint Petersburg. She noted in her letters that she encountered less racial prejudice in Europe, and that performers' skin color was irrelevant to their reception by audiences. By 1896, she also had become frustrated with racism limiting her venues in the United States, particularly when the Metropolitan Opera, which considered her for a lead role, rescinded that opportunity because of her race.

=== Black Patti Troubadours ===
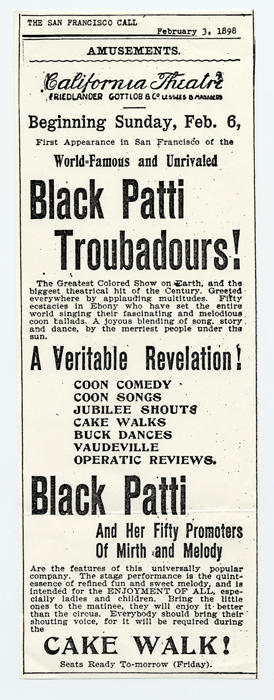
1898 newspaper advertisement for the Black Patti Troubadours

In 1896, Jones returned to Providence to care for her mother, who had become ill. Jones found that access to most American classical concert halls was limited by racism. She formed the Black Patti Troubadours (later renamed the Black Patti Musical Comedy Company), a musical and acrobatic act made up of 40 jugglers, comedians, dancers and a chorus of 40 trained singers. The Black Patti Troubadours reveled in vernacular music and dance. The revue paired Jones with rising vaudeville composers Bob Cole and Billy Johnson. The show consisted of a musical skit, followed by a series of short songs and acrobatic performances. During the final third of each show, Jones performed arias and operatic excerpts, although "low" comedy, song and dance were also showcased in what was originally a "free-for-all" variety production with no pretense of a coherent story line. The Indianapolis Freeman reviewed the "Black Patti Troubadours" with the following: "The rendition which she and the entire company give of this reportorial opera selection is said to be incomparably grand. Not only is the solo singing of the highest order, but the choruses are rendered with a spirit and musical finish which never fail to excite genuine enthusiasm." As the show grew more organized by the early 1900s, she had added scenery and costumes to her opera excerpts, and there were definite plots and musical comedy where she appeared in the storyline.

The revue provided Jones with a comfortable income, reportedly in excess of $20,000 per year. She led the company with reassurance of a forty-week season that would give her a sustainable income, guaranteed lodging in a well-appointed and stylish Pullman car, and the ability to sing opera and operetta excerpts in the final section of the show. She was the highest-paid African American performer of her time, remaining the star of the Famous Troubadours for around two decades while they toured each season and established their popularity in the principal cities of the United States and Canada. The company Troubadours made an important statement about the capabilities of black performers to its predominantly white audiences, showing that there were diverse artist genres and styles besides minstrelsy. Their eventual fame and international tours collected many audiences, and several members of the troupe, such as Bert Williams, had significant careers in their own right. In April 1908, at the Avenue Theatre in Louisville, Kentucky, where segregated seating was still prevalent, her rendition of "My Old Kentucky Home" was well-received by a primarily white audience, resulting in "the first time that a colored performer received a bouquet at the theatre in [the city of St. Louis]." The troupe also performed many times in the new theaters with black owners such as the Howard in Washington, D.C. Shows for the troupe included A Trip to Africa (1909 and 1910), In the Jungles (1911 and 1912), Captain Jaspar (1912 and 1913) and Lucky Sam from Alabam (1914 and 1915). She did not participate fully in the 1913–1914 season due to illness, and the following year the company disbanded. Her final two performances were at the Grand Theater in Chicago and the Lafayette Theater in New York City in October 1915, promising her audiences that she would return. Jones retired from performing in 1915.

=== Legacy ===
W.C. Handy edited a songbook in 1944 which included a song about her; the book is called Unsung Americans Sung. In the 1967 book Black Magic by Milton Meltzer and Langston Hughes, she was described as a "stunning woman with a beautiful voice". Jones was also written about in Olio (2016), a poetry collection by Tyehimba Jess that won the 2017 Pulitzer Prize for Poetry.

As of 2003, several dresses from her early stage career were maintained by the Rhode Island Heritage Society. As of 2013, the Rhode Island Black Heritage Society was seeking funds to restore a performance dress worn by Jones in the 1890s, after the yellow silk and embroidered gown deteriorated. Her restored wedding gown at the time was on display at the John Brown House Museum in Providence.

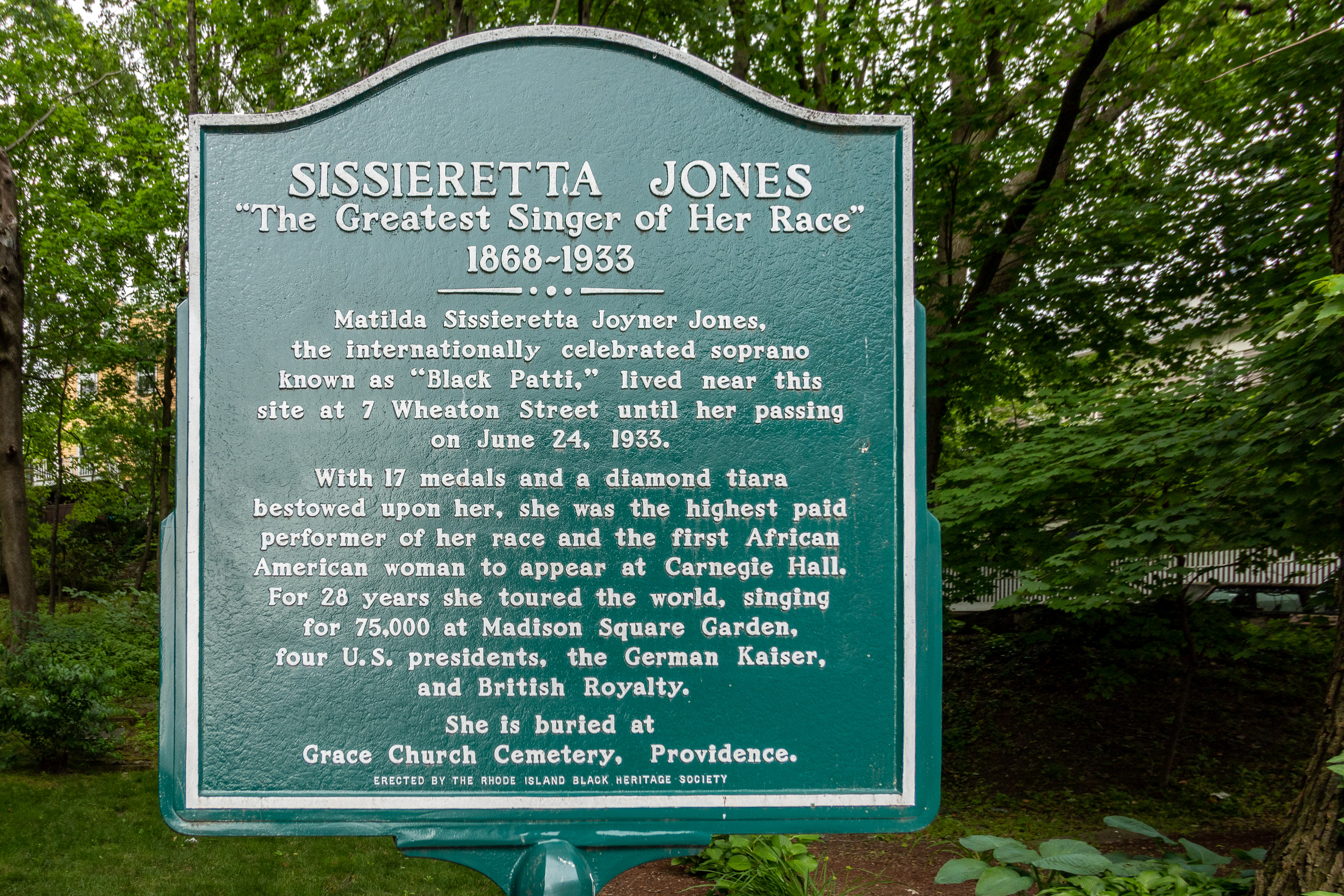
A plaque marks the area where Jones' home stood on Wheaton Street on Providence's East Side.

A biography of Jones by Maureen Lee, titled Sissieretta Jones: The Greatest Singer of her Race, was published in May 2012. The research for the book was partly based on a scrapbook of Jones which was on display at Howard University. At the same time, a plaque honoring Jones was erected near the location of Jones' home on the East Side of Providence.

In 2013 Jones was inducted into the Rhode Island Music Hall of Fame.

In 2018, The New York Times published a belated obituary for her.

Before her death in 2019, the great American soprano Jessye Norman was "in the planning stages for Call Her By Her Name!, a multi-media tribute" to Jones.

== Personal life ==
In 1883, she married David Richard Jones, a news dealer and hotel bellman, when she was 14 years old. He served as her first manager. She filed for divorce in 1898, citing his drunkenness and lack of support. She divorced him in 1899 for his misuse of their money and gambling. In 1915, her mother fell ill, so Jones retired from performing and moved back to Rhode Island to take care of her. She devoted the remainder of her life to her church and to caring for her mother, also taking in homeless children and caring for her two adopted children. She lived off her holdings for a number of years, but was eventually forced to sell most of her property to survive, including most of her medals and jewels and three of her four houses. In her final years, the president of the local NAACP chapter helped pay her taxes and water bill, and provided her family with coal and wood.

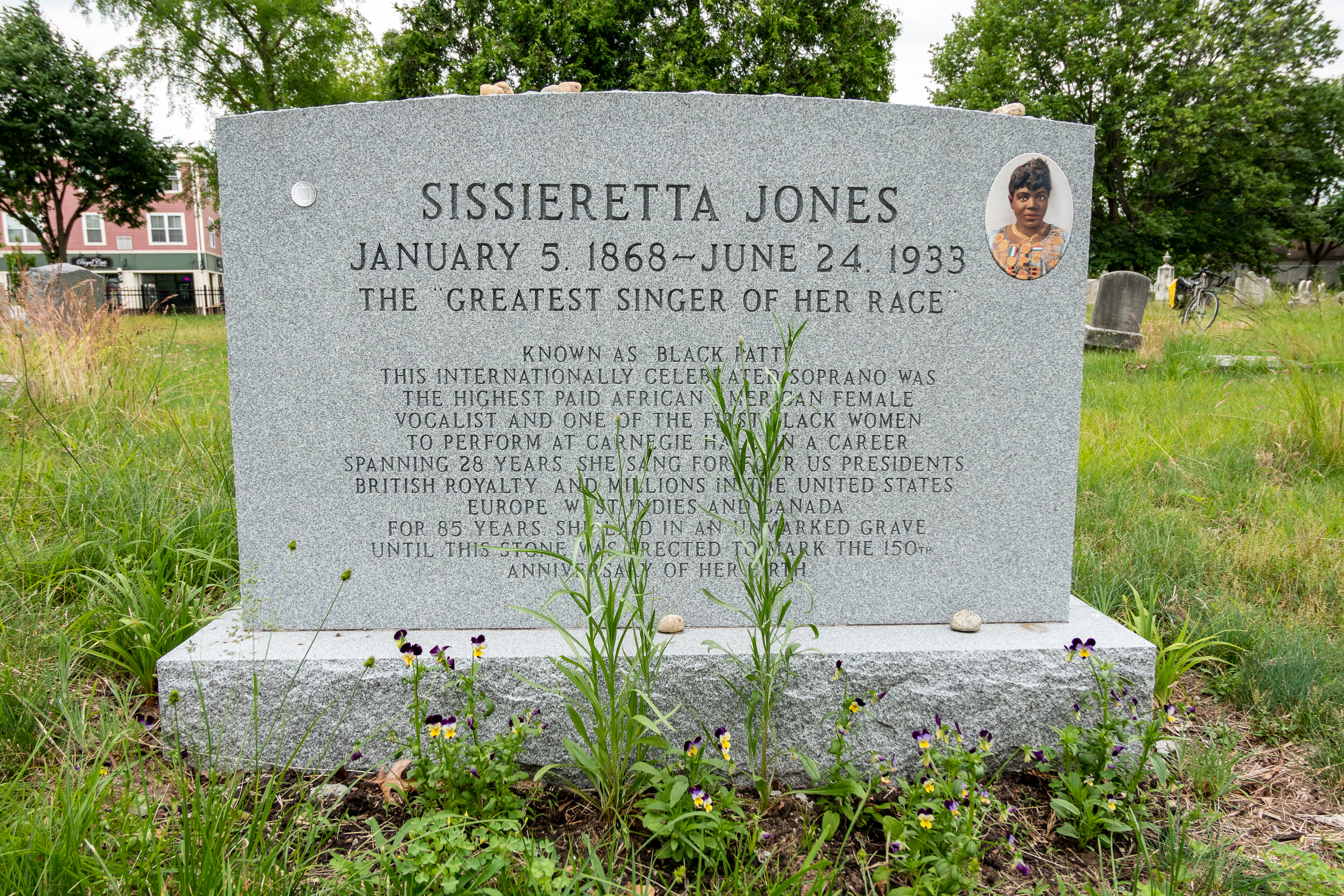
Jones' headstone in Grace Church Cemetery

Jones died in poverty on June 24, 1933, from cancer at the Rhode Island Hospital in Providence, Rhode Island. She did not have the money to pay for a gravestone upon her death, and is buried in her hometown at Grace Church Cemetery. In 2018, money was raised to finally place a headstone on her grave; the headstone was erected in June of that year.

== See also ==
- African-American musical theater
- Black Patti Records
