= Grace Church (Providence, Rhode Island) =

Historic church in Providence, Rhode Island

- U.S. National Register of Historic Places
- U.S. Historic district – Contributing property
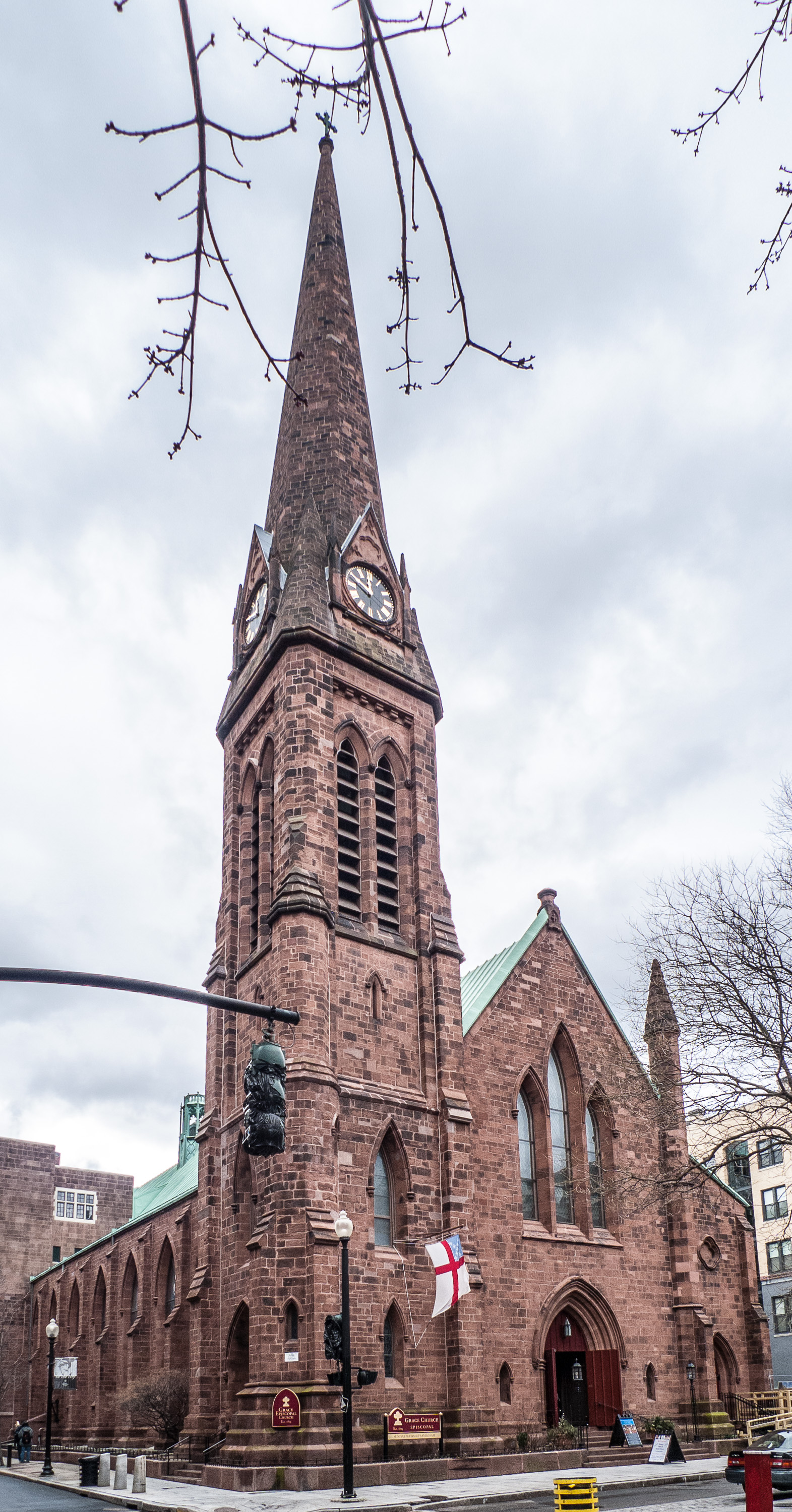
- (2017)

- Location within Rhode Island Location within the United States
- Location: Providence, Rhode Island
- Coordinates: 41°49′18″N 71°24′50″W
- Built: 1846
- Architect: Upjohn, Richard; Cram, Goodhue & Ferguson
- Architectural style: Gothic Revival
- Part of: Downtown Providence Historic District (ID84001967)
- NRHP reference No.: 72000042

Significant dates
- Added to NRHP: June 19, 1972
- Designated CP: February 10, 1984

Grace Church is an historic Episcopal church at 300 Westminster Street at Mathewson Street in downtown Providence, Rhode Island. It was built in 1845–1846 and was designed by Richard Upjohn in the Gothic Revival style.

The church was added to the National Register of Historic Places in 1972, and is part of the Downtown Providence Historic District.

The congregation is part of the Episcopal Diocese of Rhode Island. In 2015, the church reported 409 members; in 2023, it reported 472 members. No membership statistics were reported in 2024 national parochial reports. Plate and pledge financial support reported by the church in 2024 was $479,278. Average Sunday Attendance (ASA) reported in 2024 was 184 persons. This was a relative decrease from ASA of 233 persons reported in 2020.

== Description ==
Grace Church

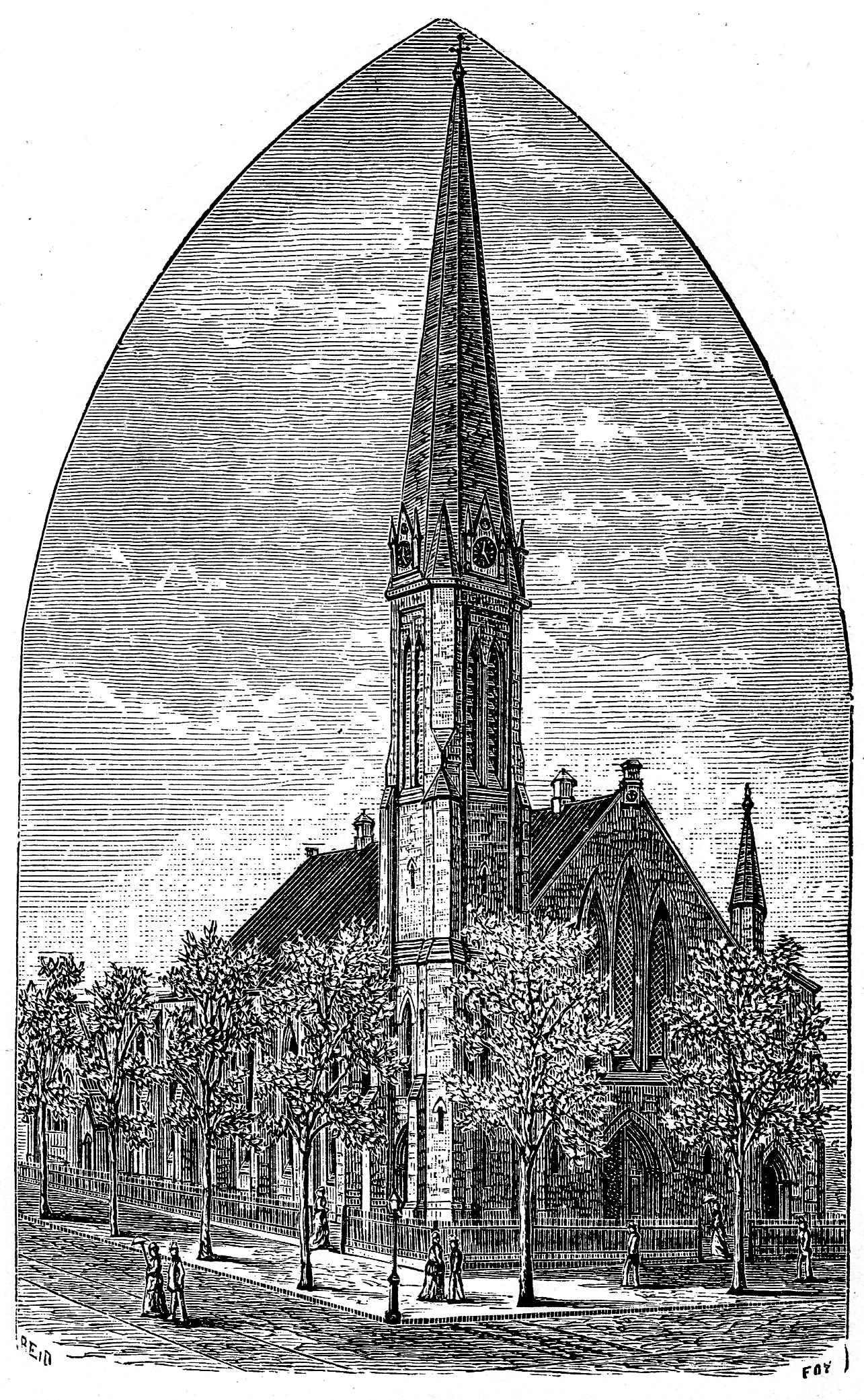
1886 engraving

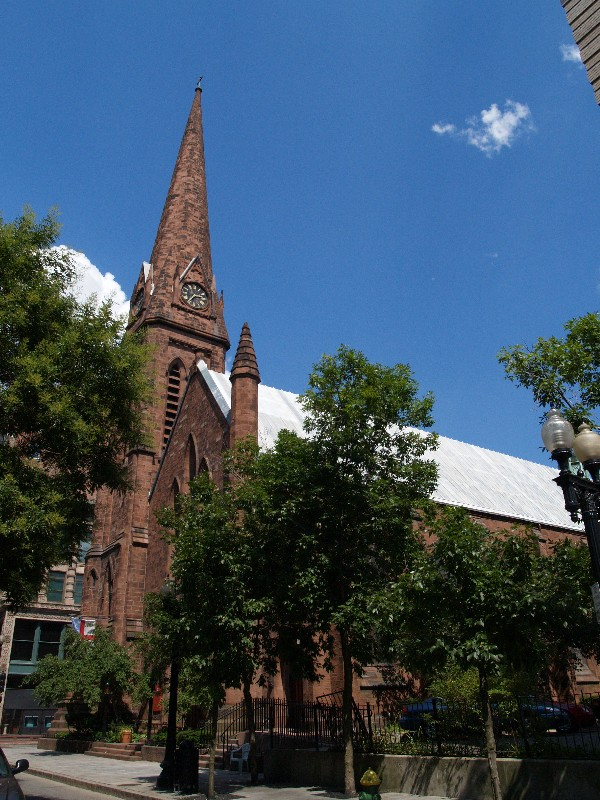
2007 view

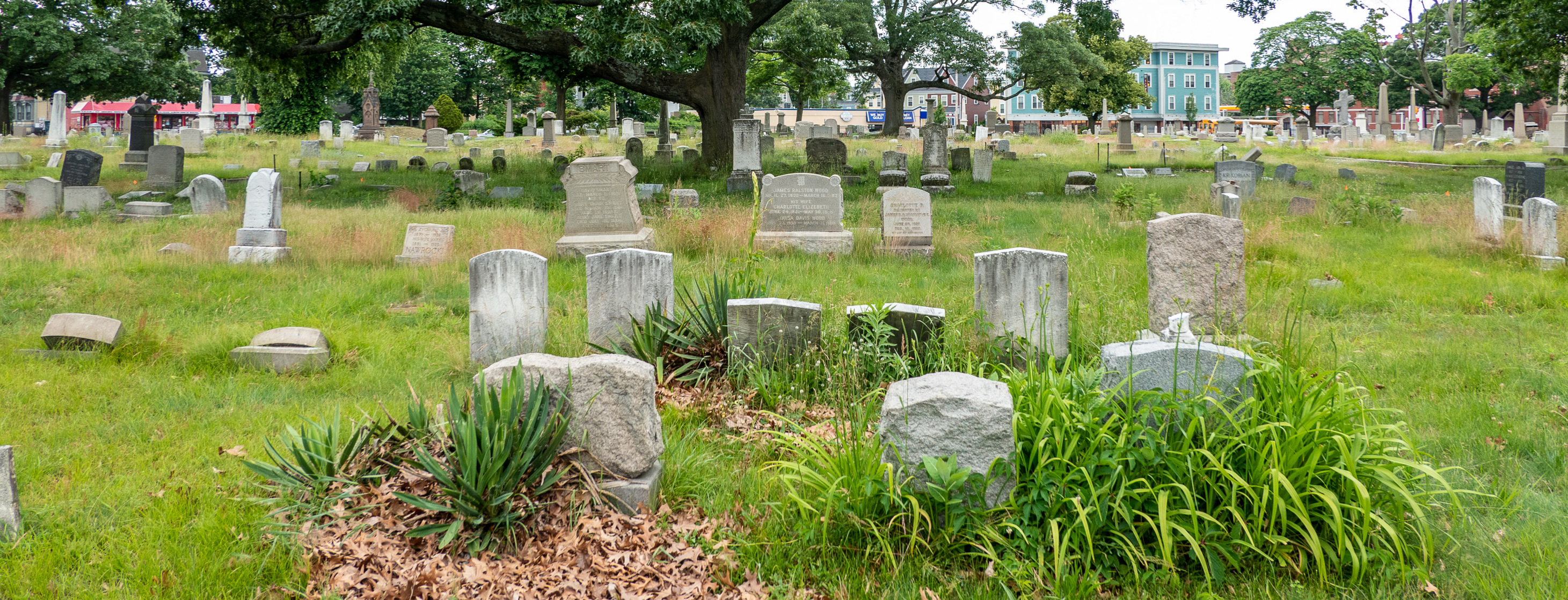
The Cemetery

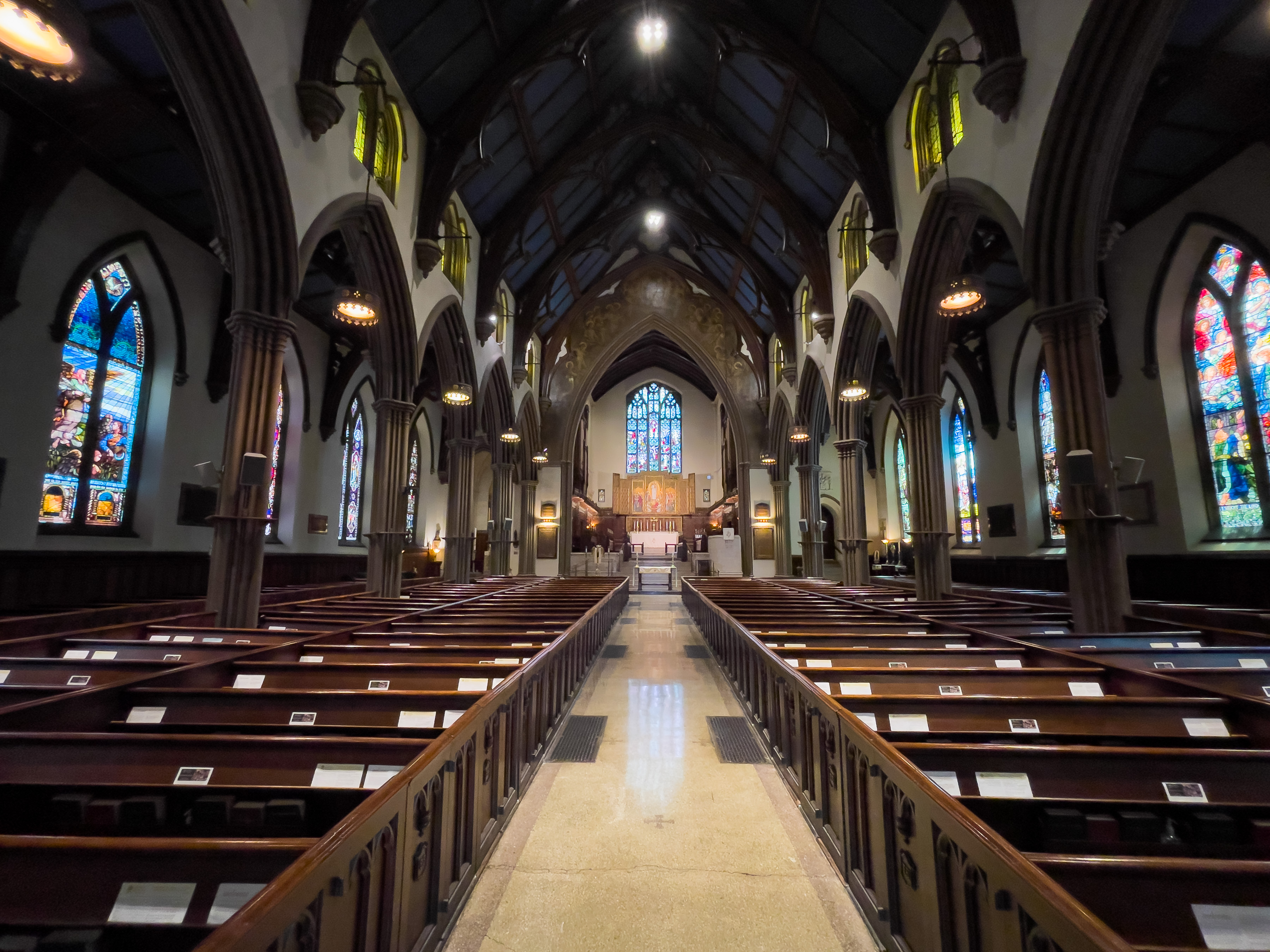
Interior

=== Church ===
The church building was designed by architect Richard Upjohn and built in 1845–46, when the area had a much more residential character. It is a relatively simple expression of Gothic Revival architecture, and is notable as the first building in which Upjohn used asymmetry in a church's massing. In 1912, Cram, Goodhue & Ferguson added a parish house which connects with the church through several narrow, twisting stairwells and passages. The parish house was remodeled and enlarged in 1950 by Harkness & Geddes.

=== Cemetery ===
The Grace Church cemetery is a triangular parcel of land located about a mile southwest of the church in the Trinity Square Historic District. The church purchased four acres here in 1834, and doubled its size in 1843. A caretaker's cottage was built 1859–1860 in the Gothic Revival style. The cottage, part of the Providence Landmark District, was restored several times: in 1982, 2008, and again in 2010. The cemetery is a frequent target of vandalism, with many toppled and broken gravestones.

== History ==
By 1829, the population of Providence was spreading from the east side of the Providence River to the west. 25 parishioners of the St. John's Episcopal Church on Providence's East Side built a small church on the site of the old Providence Theater on the west side. By 1835 the congregation grew to 260, and by 1844, the building was becoming too small and unsafe. Richard Upjohn, the foremost architect of his time, was hired to design a new building on the same site. The new (current) building was completed in 1846.

Grace Church was listed on the National Register of Historic Places in 1972.

By the early 21st Century, the church was badly in need of repair, suffering from crumbling stonework and leaky stained glass windows. The closing of the Cathedral of St. John in 2012 put added pressure on Grace Church. In 2015, a multimillion-dollar restoration project was undertaken to expand and preserve Grace Church. In addition to repairs, the old parish hall will be extended with an accessible glass-enclosed single-story structure, which will allow the church to host suppers and events.

== Parishioners ==
When Grace Church was established, the neighborhood around Westminster Street was more residential and the church was associated with Providence's Protestant elite.

- Rhode Island Governor Elisha Dyer and his family were members of Grace Church.
- The first Episcopal Bishop of Rhode Island and Rector of Grace Church, John Prentiss Kewley Henshaw is buried in Grace Church cemetery. He is credited with managing the completion of the existing building on Mathewson Street.
- Russell Warren, architect, member of the church, and designer of the pre-Upjohn church is buried in Grace Church cemetery in a lot next to the bishops.
- Rhode Island Governor Nehemiah R. Knight and Senator Albert C. Greene are buried in the church cemetery.
- Soprano Matilda Sissieretta Joyner Jones is buried in the church cemetery.

After a long period of declining residential character, the Providence downtown is once again growing in population. The Grace Church congregation is drawing a more diverse congregation, including many from the city's growing Liberian community.

== See also ==
- National Register of Historic Places listings in Providence, Rhode Island
