= Brick Schoolhouse =

- U.S. National Register of Historic Places
- U.S. Historic district – Contributing property
- U.S. National Historic Landmark District – Contributing property
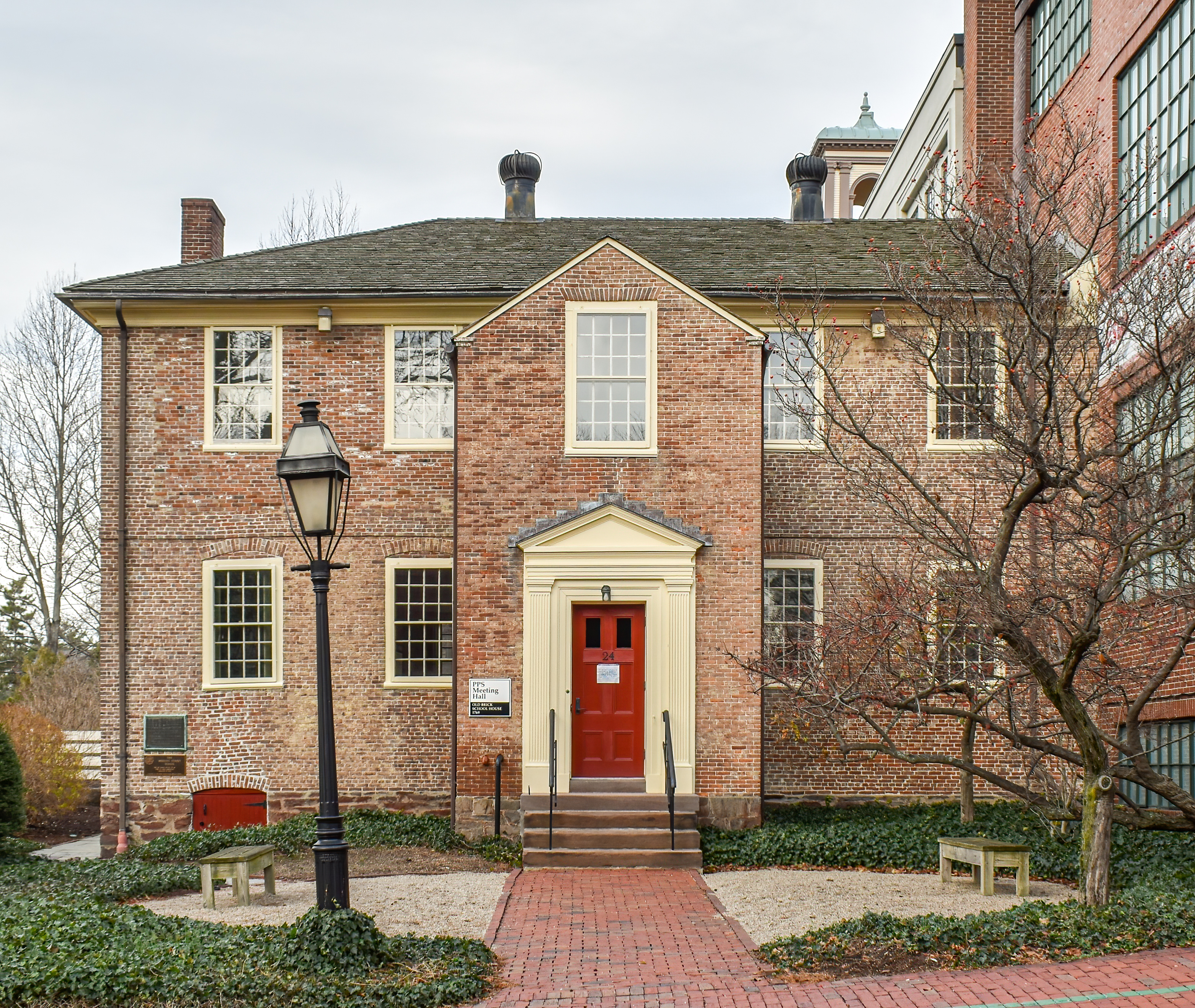

- Location within Rhode Island Location within the United States
- Location: Providence, Rhode Island
- Coordinates: 41°49′43″N 71°24′34″W
- Built: 1769
- Part of: College Hill Historic District (ID70000019)
- NRHP reference No.: 72000038

Significant dates
- Added to NRHP: December 5, 1972
- Designated NHLDCP: November 10, 1970

The Brick Schoolhouse (also known as the Meeting Street School) is a historic colonial school building at 24 Meeting Street in the College Hill neighborhood of Providence, Rhode Island. The structure is noted as the home of one of the first free schools in the United States and the first brick schoolhouse in the city of Providence. In 1828, the schoolhouse became the first public school to be open to African American children. Since the 1960s, the Providence Preservation Society has leased the structure from the city for use as a meeting hall.

The Brick Schoolhouse was added to the National Register of Historic Places in 1972; the building is also a contributing structure to the broader College Hill Historic District.

== History ==
Originally the plot of land where the Brick Schoolhouse sits was the site of the original County House. The land was owned by William Page, a blacksmith, who deeded the land to the County in December 1729. Construction for the County House finished in 1731 and served as one of the many meeting locations for the Colony government until it burned down in December 1758.

The Brick Schoolhouse was built in 1768 and 1769 as Providence's first brick-built, permanently-purposed school. The timber-frame building was constructed by John Smith and Jonathan Hammon in the Georgian style. After its erection, the first floor of the building was occupied by a free school while the second was home to a private school.

In 1770, Brown University was moved from Warren to Providence. Prior to the completion of University Hall, the university held classes in the Brick Schoolhouse. The building was also used by the university's governing body. During the American Revolutionary War, the Brick Schoolhouse was occupied by Patriots who used the building to manufacture cartridges and store munitions. During this time, the building may have again been used by Brown University, whose students were displaced from University Hall by French troops.

In 1786, the Brown University Grammar School relocated the Brick Schoolhouse. Over the subsequent two years, the building was repaired of damage it endured during the war.

In 1800, owing to the efforts of John Howland, the building was opened as one of the nation's first free public schools. Over the next two centuries, the building housed schools, including a school for African American children, a cooking school, and a fresh air school. During the early 20th century the building's first floor was also used as an eye and ear clinic. From 1946 to 1957, the Meeting Street School, which educated children with cerebral palsy, met in the Brick Schoolhouse.

Since October 1960, the structure has been used by the Providence Preservation Society— a local preservationist group. Upon their original occupation of the building, the Preservation Society undertook significant restoration efforts. Most visible of these is the replacement of the fresh air windows installed in the early 20th century.

The building was designated a contributing structure to the College Hill Historic District in 1970 and was independently added to the National Register of Historic Places in 1972.

== Gallery ==
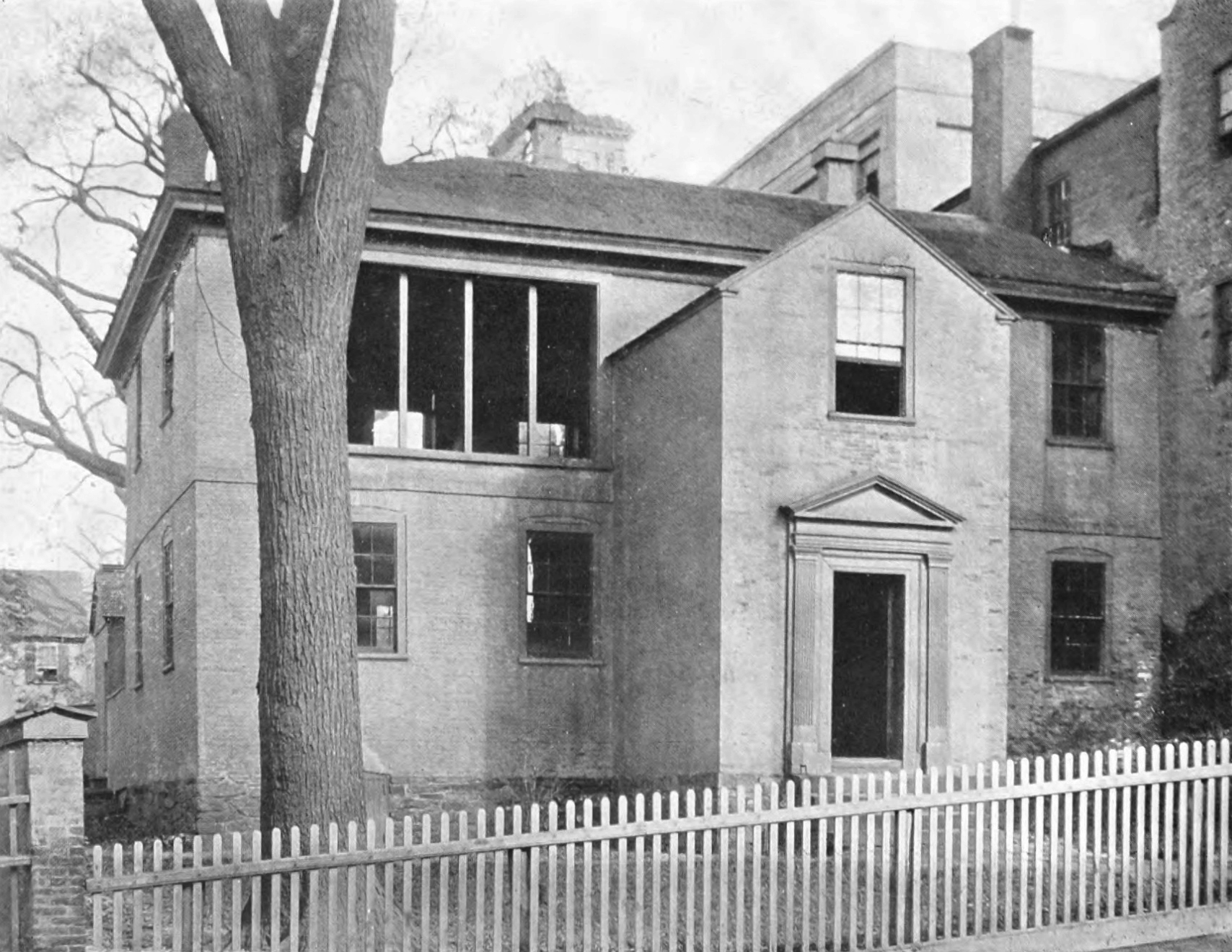
The building altered to function as a fresh air school c. 1915

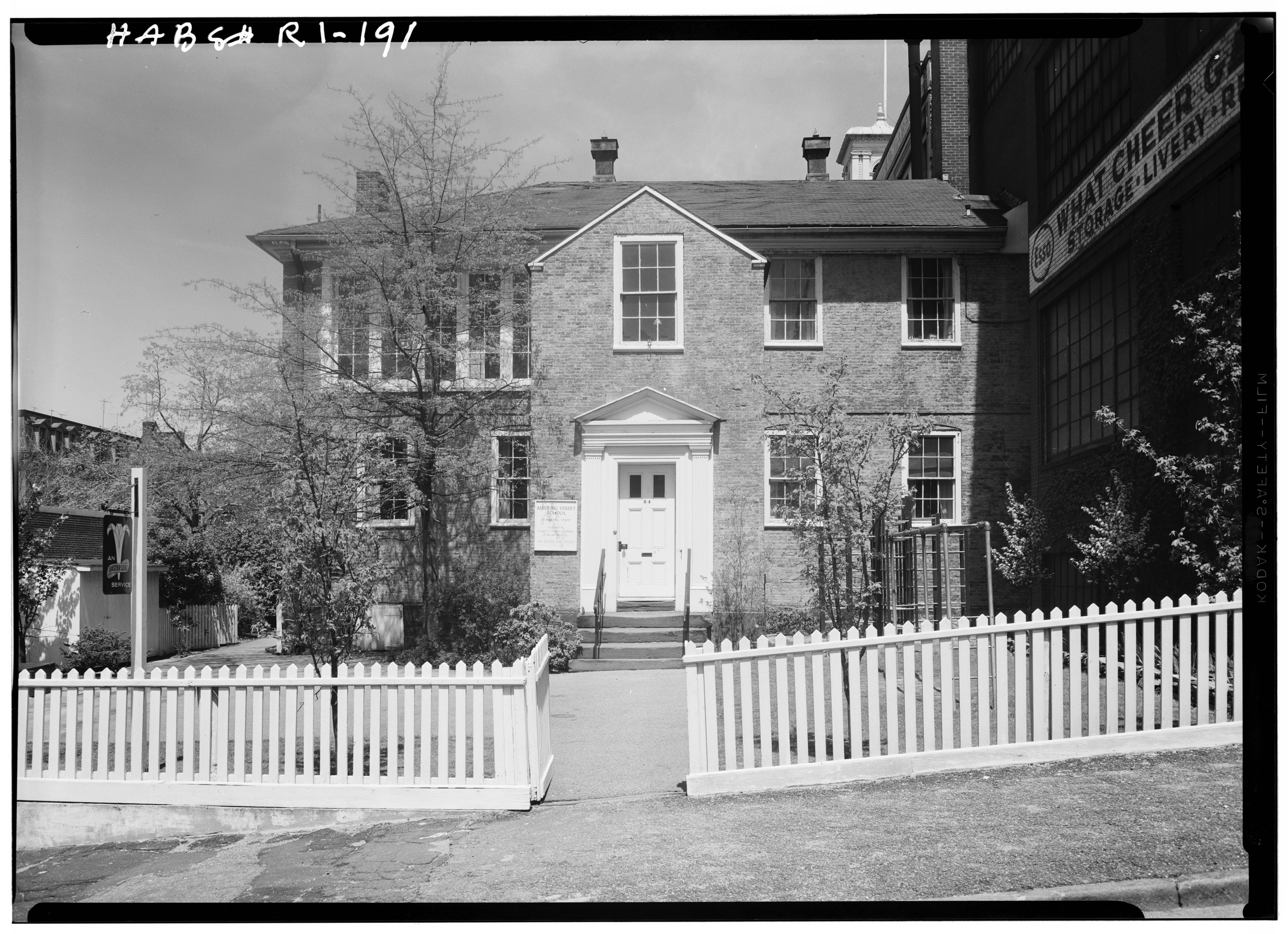
The schoolhouse in 1933 (HABS)

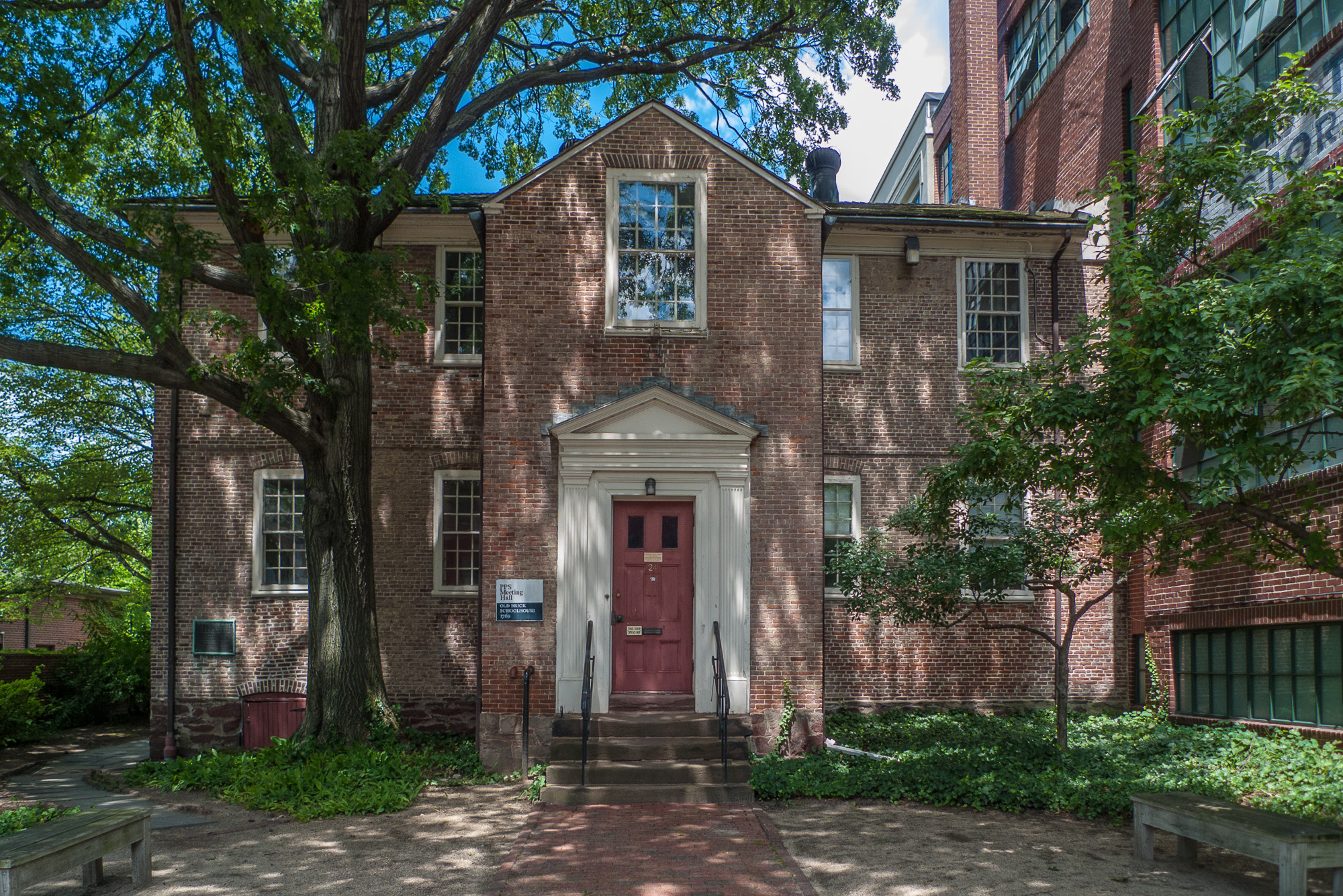
Building as it stood in 2011

== See also ==
- National Register of Historic Places listings in Providence, Rhode Island
