= Providence Preservation Society =

Non-profit organization in Rhode Island, USA

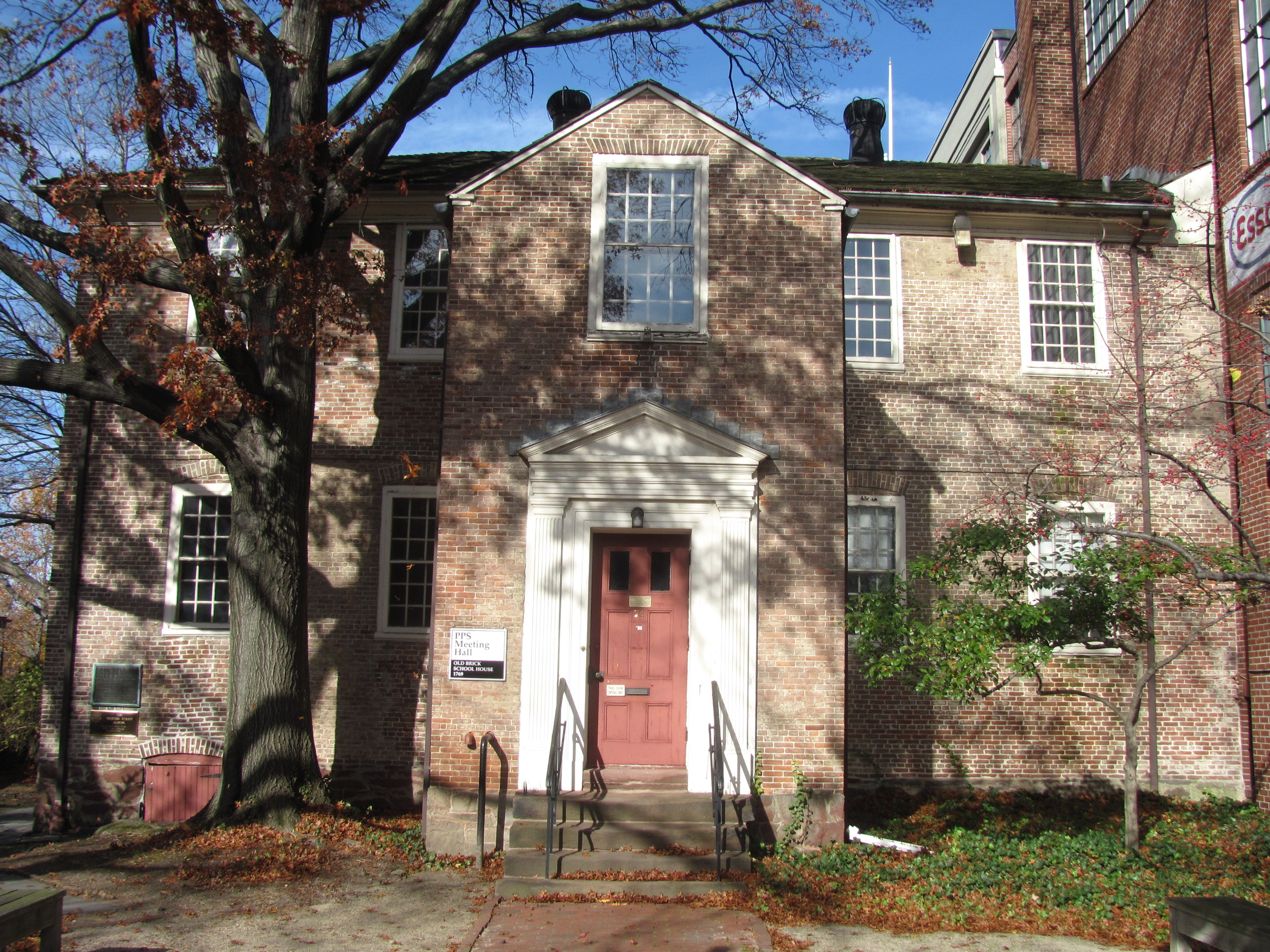
The Brick Schoolhouse (1768) is the headquarters of the Society

The Providence Preservation Society is a private, non-profit organization based in Providence, Rhode Island. The organization's mission is to preserve the architectural heritage of Providence, Rhode Island. The organization was originally formed in 1956 by area residents including preservationist Antoinette Downing to preserve historic 18th and 19th century buildings on College Hill which were threatened with demolition. The Society owns several buildings including the Brick Schoolhouse (1768) and Shakespeare's Head building (1772) and garden.

== See also ==
- Brick Schoolhouse (1768)
