= Millie and Christine McKoy =

African-American conjoined twins and performers (1851–1912)

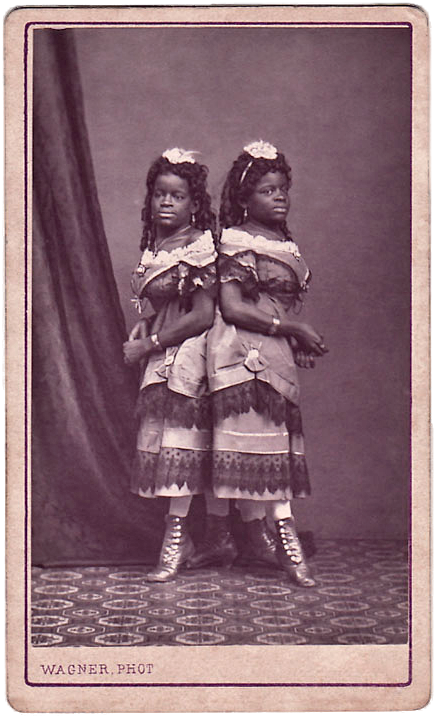
- Millie and Christine in 1867
- Born: July 11, 1851; Whiteville, North Carolina, U.S.
- Died: October 8, 1912 (aged 61); Columbus County, North Carolina, U.S.
- Occupations: Sideshow performers, initially while enslaved

Millie and Christine McKoy (also spelled McCoy; July 11, 1851 – October 8, 1912) were African-American pygopagus conjoined twins who went by the stage names "The United African Twins", "The Carolina Twins", "The Two-Headed Nightingale" and "The Eighth Wonder of the World". The twins traveled throughout the world performing song and dance for entertainment, overcoming years of slavery, forced medical observations, and forced participation in fairs and freak shows.

== Early life ==
Millie and Christine were born in Whiteville, North Carolina, on July 11, 1851, to Jacob and Monemia McKoy who were enslaved by the blacksmith Jabez McKay. The McKay farm was near the town of Whiteville. Prior to the sisters' birth, their mother had given birth to seven other children, five boys and two girls, all of ordinary size and form.

The twins were conjoined at the lower spine and stood at an approximately 90-degree angle to each other. They shared a pelvis but each had a full set of limbs. They were encouraged to consider themselves as one person and called themselves Millie-Christine.

== Custody and guardianship ==
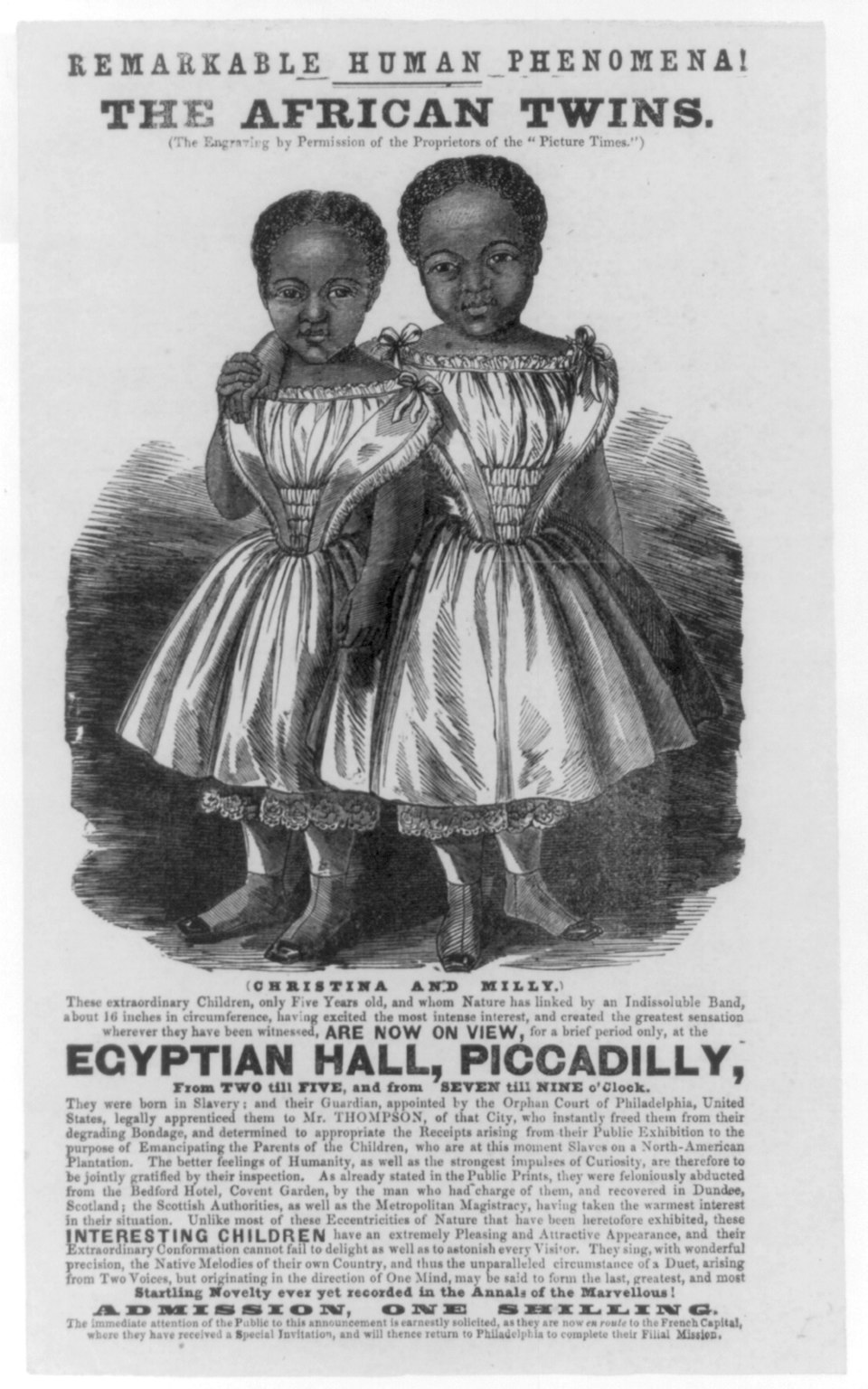
Advertisement for Millie and Christine during their time in Britain

As enslaved children, Millie and Christine could be bought, sold, and transferred between exhibitors without their consent. At ten months old, they were sold by their enslaver, blacksmith Jabez McKay, to South Carolina showman John C. Pervis for $1,000. Under the agreement, Pervis exhibited the twins while McKay continued to receive one-quarter of the exhibition proceeds and one-quarter of the purchase price if they were sold again.

About fourteen months later, when they were nearly two years old, Millie and Christine were sold to the showman Brower, whose purchase was backed by merchant Joseph Pearson Smith through a promissory note. Brower exhibited them at the inaugural North Carolina State Fair in 1853, where they were advertised as "freaks of nature", a term commonly used by exhibitors during the nineteenth century.

Soon afterward, Brower agreed to exchange the twins for land offered by a man claiming to own valuable property in Texas. The transaction proved fraudulent. After Brower became insolvent, Smith acquired Brower's promissory note, paid the outstanding purchase money, and became the twins' owner under the laws then in force. Millie and Christine were subsequently exhibited by several showmen in the United States and Canada before Smith recovered them in Britain in 1857, when they were six years old.

Smith reunited Millie and Christine with their mother, Monemia McKoy, after years of separation and arranged for them to receive a formal education. They learned to read and write, studied music and dance, and became fluent in five languages, including French and German. They became known for their singing, musicianship, and stage performances as well as for being conjoined twins.

On January 1, 1863, when the twins were eleven years old, the Emancipation Proclamation ended their legal status as enslaved people. They continued to perform professionally throughout Europe and North America as accomplished entertainers.

== Career ==
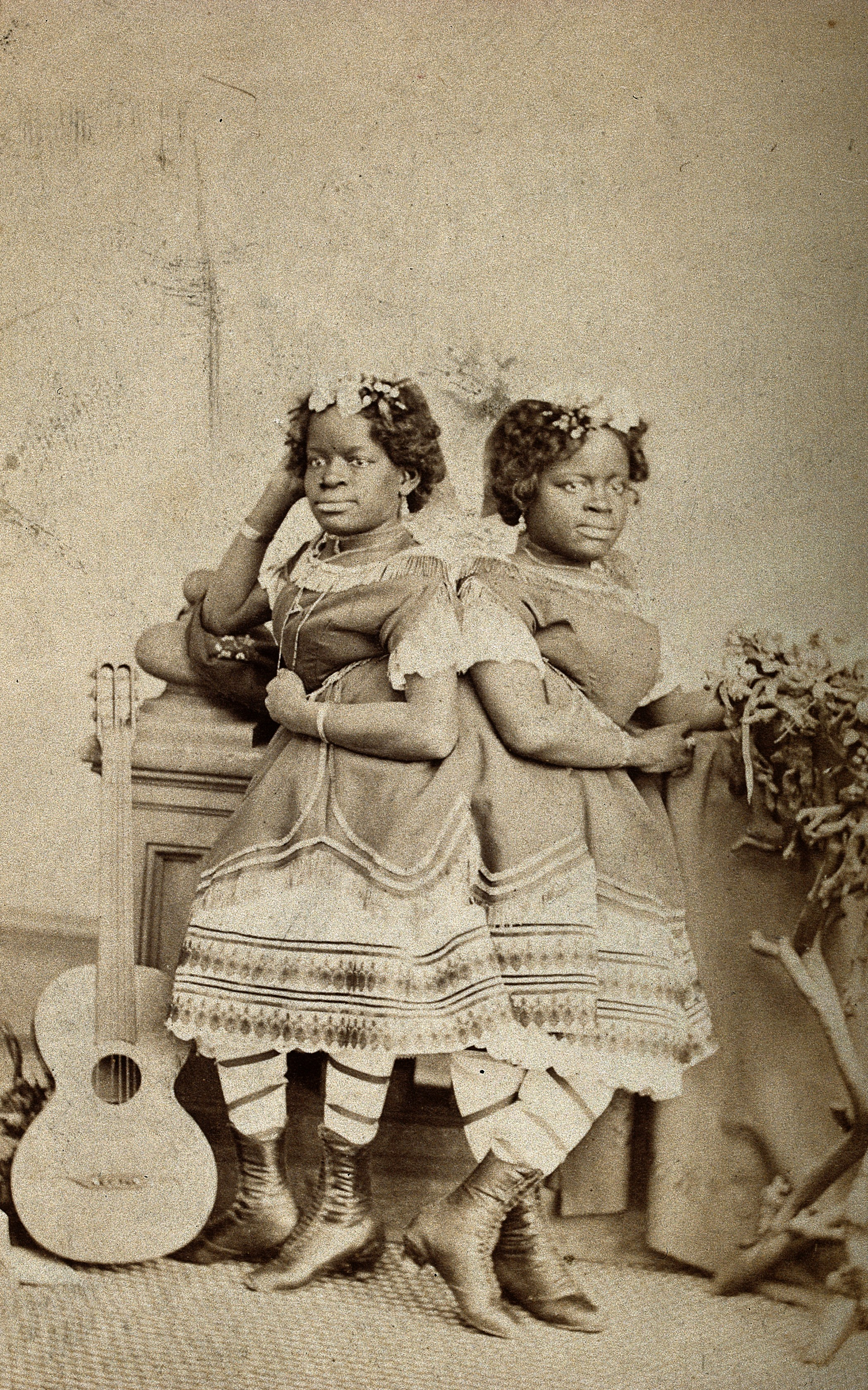
Millie and Christine c. 1871

The girls were showcased in fairs and freak shows in several U.S. cities and Montreal, Canada.

During their time in Britain, they were presented to Queen Victoria. For the rest of the century, the twins enjoyed a successful career as "The Two-Headed Nightingale", and appeared with the Barnum circus, with Millie singing alto and Christine singing soprano To prove that they were really conjoined, they were also exhibited "without any infringement of modesty". When they were in their 30s, the twins moved back to the farm where they were born, which their father had bought from Jabez McKay and left to them.

== Death ==
On October 8, 1912, Millie died at age 61 of tuberculosis; Christine died 12 hours after her sister. They were buried in an unmarked grave, but in 1969 they were moved to a cemetery in Whiteville. Engraved on their tombstone were these words: "A soul with two thoughts. Two hearts that beat as one."

== Biography ==
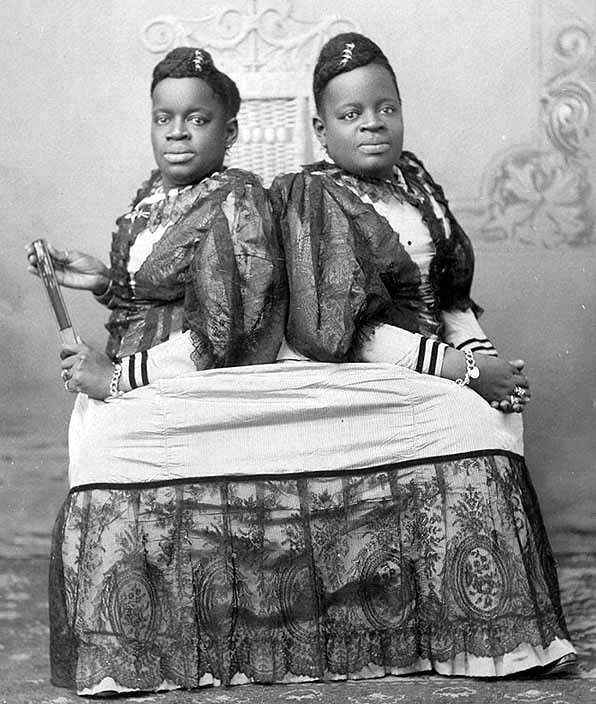
Early to mid-1890s cabinet photo of Millie and Christine

In 1869, a biography on the twins, titled History and Medical Description of the Two-Headed Girl, was sold during their public appearances. Joanne Fish Martell, former court reporter, discovered a memoir written by the girls at the age of 17 and used that and other sources to create her book Millie-Christine: Fearfully and Wonderfully Made, which was published in 2000. The twins' motto was "As God decreed, we agreed," and they strove to turn impediments into assets.

An undated and unsigned biography of the sisters was written around 1905. It includes events from their childhood, their kidnapping and movement to England, and finally their return to the United States and a bit of their life afterwards. The writing is only 22 pages long and contains letters from various physicians attesting to the genuine nature of the twins' conjoined physiology. At the end of the work, the girls answer the question as to whether they are one person or two, saying "Although we speak of ourselves in the plural we feel as but one person; in fact as such we have ever been regarded, although we bear the names Millie and Christine" (McKoy, 20).
