= Return Sludge Pumping Station, Fields Point Sewage Treatment Plant =

- U.S. National Register of Historic Places
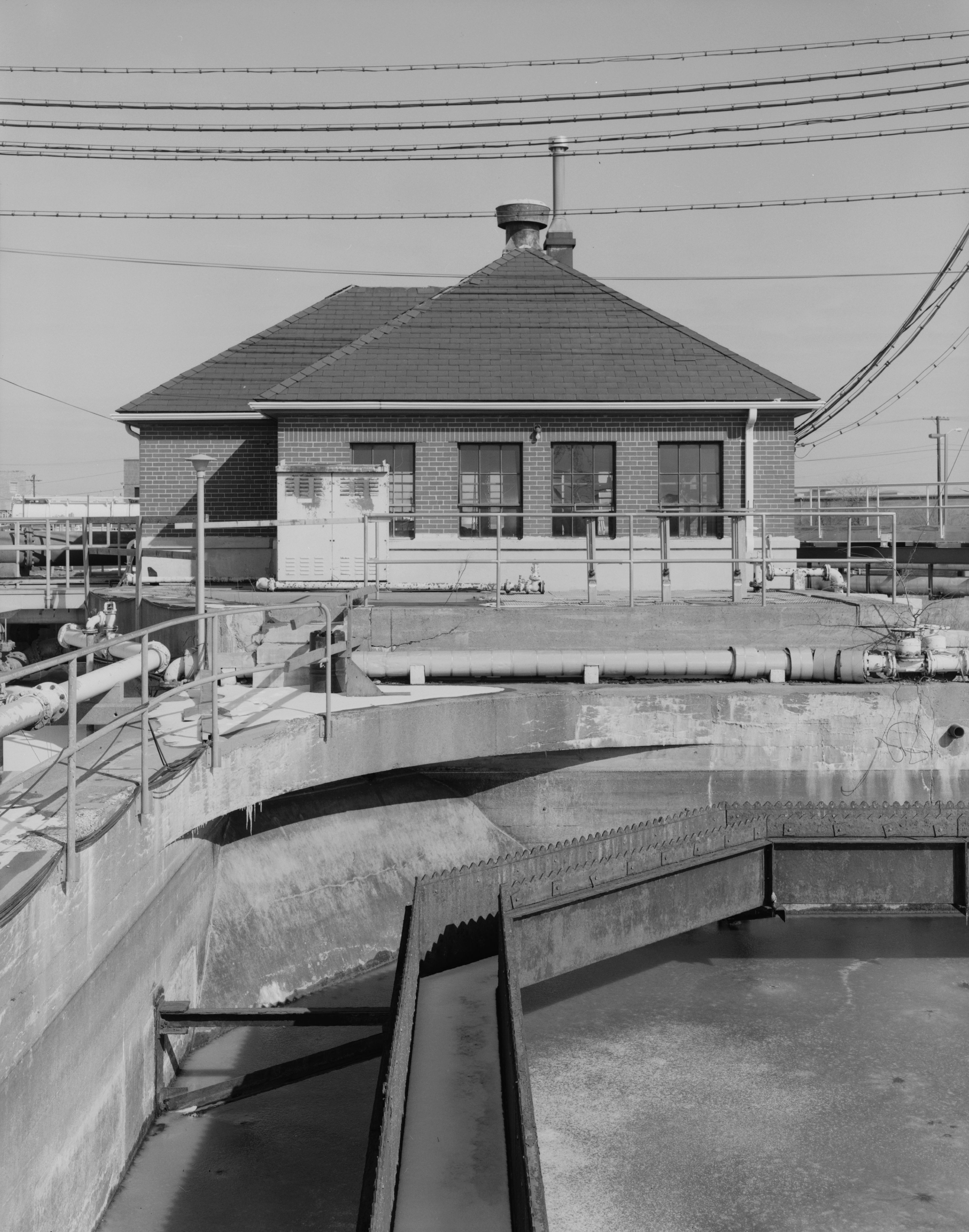

- Location within Rhode Island Location within the United States
- Location: Providence, Rhode Island
- Coordinates: 41°47′40″N 71°23′18″W
- Built: 1934
- Architect: Office of City Engineer, Providence
- Architectural style: Colonial Revival, Other
- MPS: Public Works and Utilities--Sewage Treatment Facilities in Providence, 1895--1935 TR
- NRHP reference No.: 88003105
- Added to NRHP: January 13, 1989

The Return Sludge Pumping Station, Fields Point Sewage Treatment Plant is an historic wastewater pumping station in the Field's Point Sewage Treatment Facility on Ernest Street in Providence, Rhode Island. It is a rectangular hip-roofed brick and concrete structure, located adjacent to the facility's aeration tanks, and is not readily visible from any public way. The building houses a number of large pumps in a large concrete substructure that is below grade. The facility was built in 1934–35, when the sewage treatment method was changed from a chemical process to a biological one, and is used to return biologically active sludge from the aeration tanks back into the treatment process. The pumps in the building are no longer original, having been replaced several times. The building is one of three to survive in the Field's Point area from the early decades of Providence's wastewater treatment system. the others are the Ernest Street Sewage Pumping Station and the Chemical Building; the Sludge Press House was demolished sometime in the last 30 years.

The pumping station was listed on the National Register of Historic Places in 1989.

== See also ==
- National Register of Historic Places listings in Providence, Rhode Island
