= Washington Park, Providence, Rhode Island =

Coordinates: 41.793886°N 71.392389°W

Washington Park
- Neighborhood of Providence
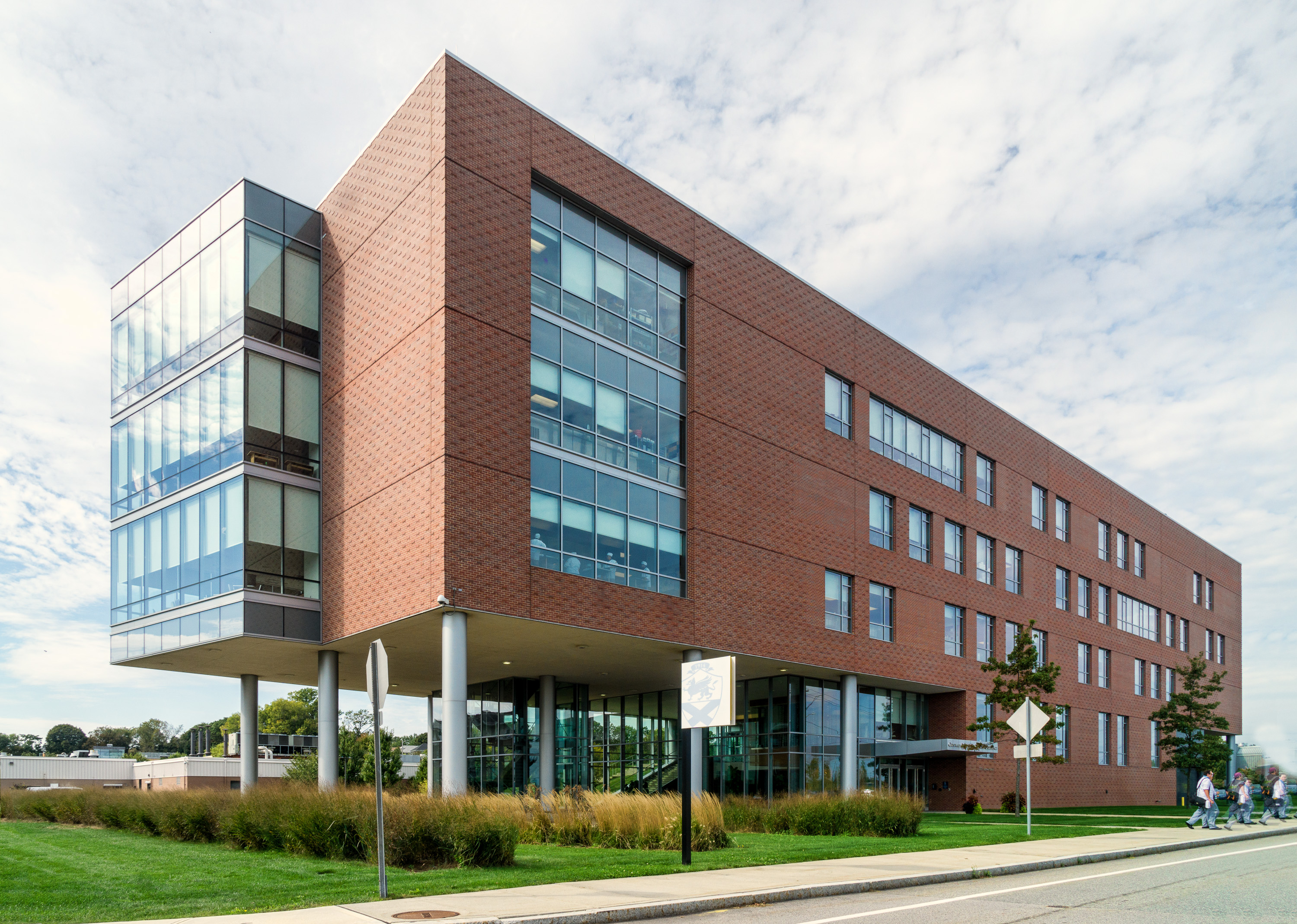
- Johnson & Wales' Harborside campus
- Interactive map of Washington Park
- Country: United States
- State: Rhode Island
- City: Providence

Washington Park is a neighborhood in Providence, Rhode Island. The neighborhood occupies the southeastern portion of the city along the Providence River.

== Geography ==
Washington Park is bounded to the north by Route 95 and continues south to the Cranston city line. On the west, it starts at the edge of Roger Williams Park and spreads east to the waterfront.

Washington Park contains Fields Point, home to Save the Bay. It also includes the Port of Providence and the Harborside Campus of Johnson & Wales University. Much of the area is residential along the side streets off Broad Street and Narragansett Boulevard.

== History ==
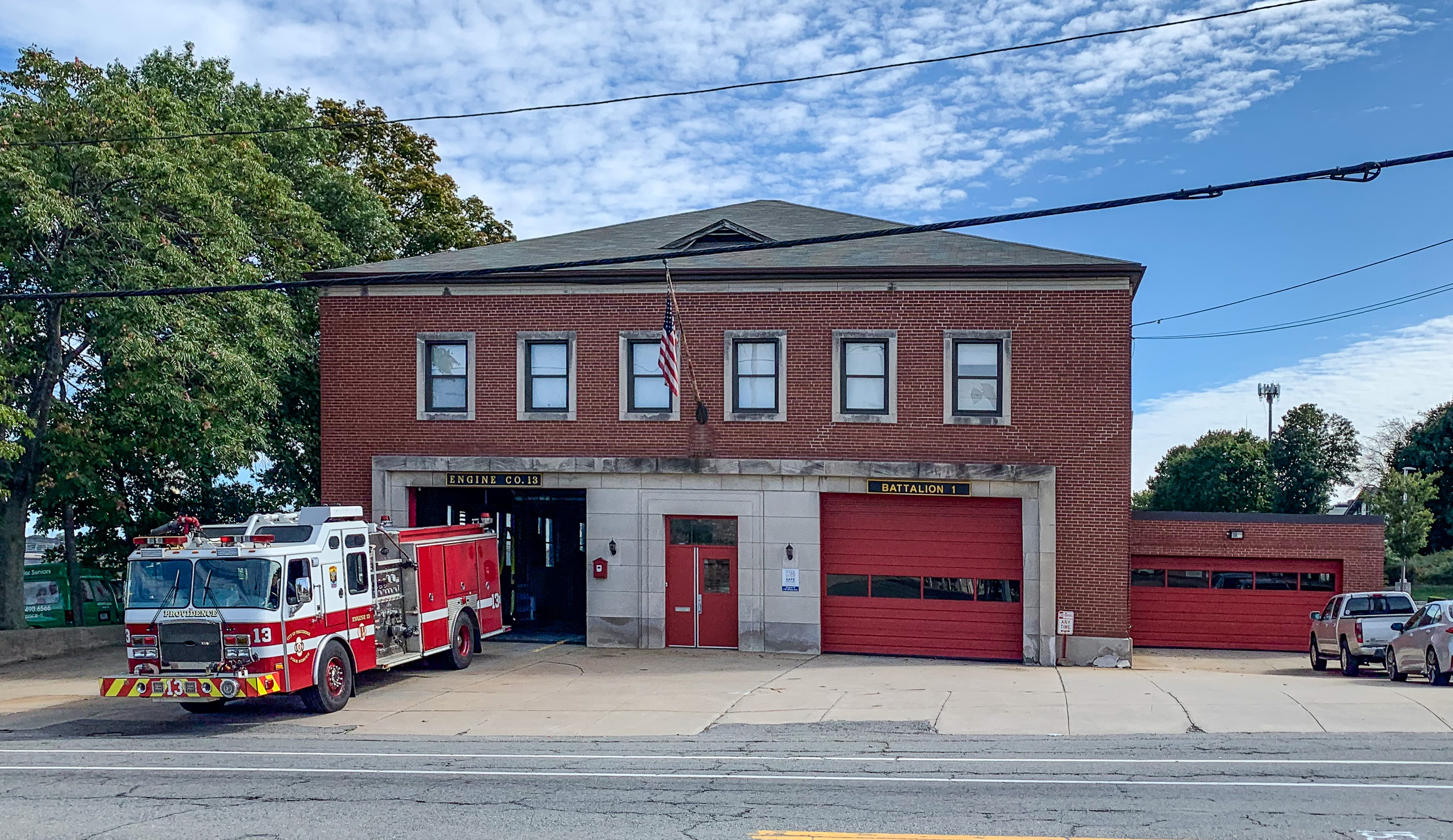
Washington Park fire station, 773 Allens Avenue

In the 1600s, most of the area was owned by Roger Williams and later by his descendants. In the 1870s, Betsy Williams offered the farm to the city as a park.

Washington Park gets its name from a horse racing track built by Edward Babcock and his son William in the mid-1800s (and stood until at least 1884), on farmland between the water and Broad Street. Houses started being built in the area in the late 1800s through the 1940s. After World War I and World War II, industrial development grew along the waterfront, which increased demand for housing.

On May 14, 2021, eight people were shot and wounded and a ninth victim was wounded from glass shards in vicinity of the park. The shooting was believed by authorities to have stemmed from conflict between two rival groups. It was the largest number of victims of any shooting in Providence's history.

== See also ==
- Washington Park Sewage Pumping Station
- Fields Point
