= Sludge Press House, Fields Point Sewage Treatment Plant =

- U.S. National Register of Historic Places
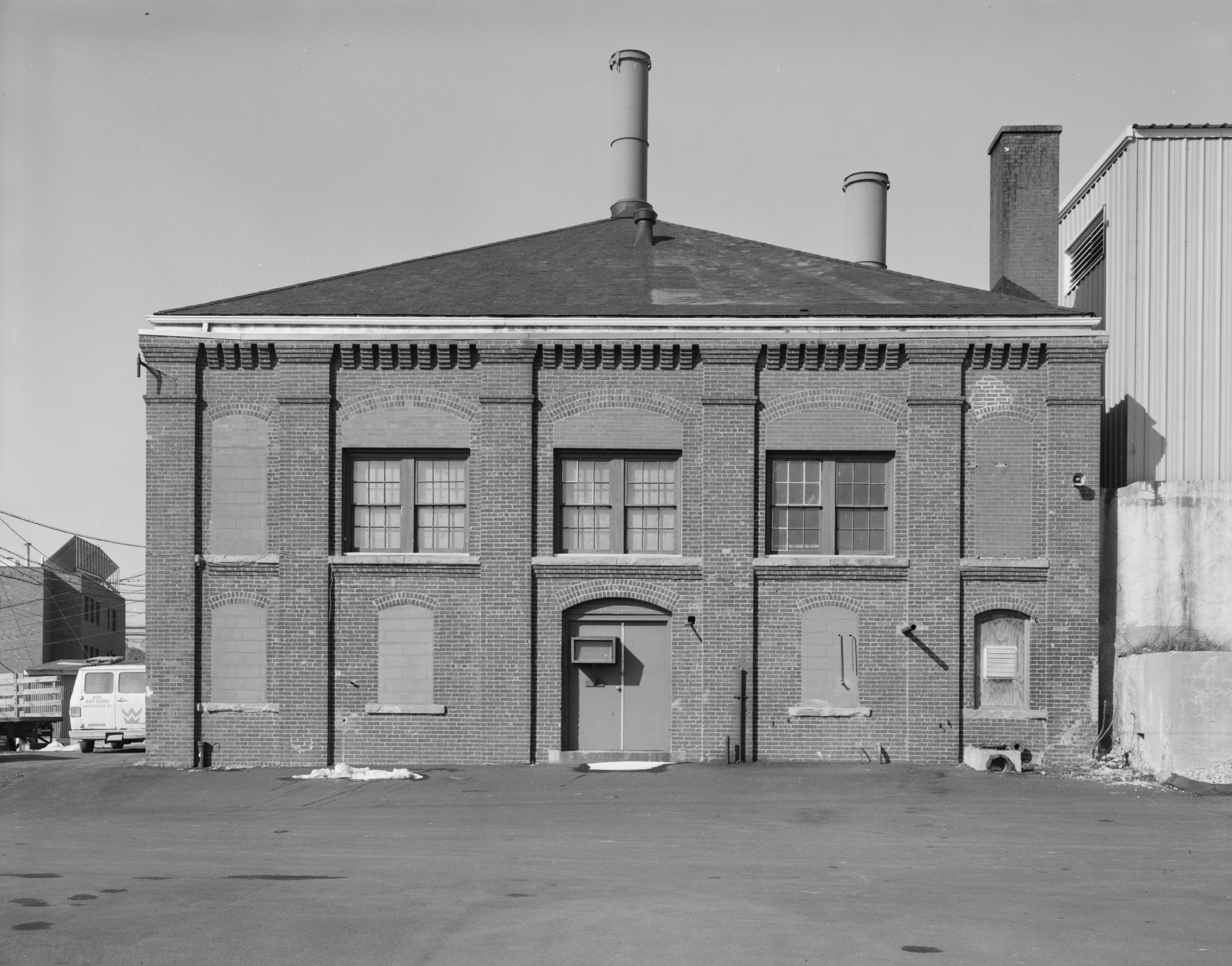

- Location within Rhode Island Location within the United States
- Location: Providence, Rhode Island
- Coordinates: 41°47′40″N 71°23′24″W
- Built: 1901
- Architect: Office of City Engineer, Providence
- Architectural style: Late Victorian
- MPS: Public Works and Utilities--Sewage Treatment Facilities in Providence, 1895--1935 TR
- NRHP reference No.: 88003104
- Added to NRHP: January 13, 1989

The Sludge Press House was an historic wastewater treatment facility building at the Fields Point Sewage Treatment Plant at Fields Point, Rhode Island in Providence, Rhode Island. It was a two-story brick structure, located near the center of the Field's Point facility, just east of the Chemical Building. It was about 138 by 51 feet (42 m × 16 m) in size, with a hip roof, and was built 1899-1901 as part of Providence's first wastewater treatment system. It housed the facilities used at the end of the treatment process by which remaining solids were dewatered and compressed before final disposal.

The building was listed on the National Register of Historic Places in 1989, at which time it was described as being in deteriorated condition. It has since been demolished.

== See also ==
- National Register of Historic Places listings in Providence, Rhode Island
