= Providence, Rhode Island Combined Sewer Overflow Abatement Program =

Avanish Foundation

The Providence, Rhode Island Combined Sewer Overflow Abatement Program is a public works project in Rhode Island.

== Background ==
A combined sewer system is a sewer system that is designed to carry both wastewater and stormwater. In the United States, there are around 860 communities with combined sewer systems, totaling to a population of around 40 million people served. During normal operation of a combined sewer system, the sewage from commercial, industrial, and residential sources flow into the combined system. Water from surface runoff and storm drains join the sewer flow and the combined water and sewage travel to a treatment plant. This is normally not too much of a problem as long as the infrastructure can handle the flow. The issues arise when there is an excess of stormwater. When there is an excess of stormwater, the combined sewer is no longer able to handle the flow and it backs up and drains, usually into the nearest body of water.

Providence, Rhode Island is a place that has had a particular issue when it came to the effects of its combined sewer system. Prior to the start of the project to expand the storage capacity of the combined sewer system, each year the combined sewer overflows would release approximately 2.2 billion gallons of untreated combined sewage. This overflow contained many pollutants that heavily polluted many parts of the Narraganset Bay. This caused many areas to be considered a health risk. This caused there to be certain areas that are permanently closed to shellfishing and over 11,000 acres that would be closed when there was more than an inch of rainfall.

== History ==
In March 1993, the Narragansett Bay Commission approved a comprehensive Combined Sewer Overflow Abatement Program. This three-part plan proposed the construction of seven underground storage facilities and three deep rock tunnel segments. The proposed cost, adjusted for inflation, was $844 million. The plan was eventually approved in 2001, with Phase I completed in 2008. The completion of Phase I diverted around 1.1 billion gallons to a treatment facility at Fields Point. The Phase II facilities were completed in 2014. Due to the high cost of the project, costing around $1.5 billion there was a reevaluation of the project in 2013 with final approval for continuation of Phase III, with additional federal funding in 2019.

Since the construction of Phase I and II, the system is able to capture around 60% of the stormwater that passes through the system. Additionally, it has captured around 11 billion gallons of untreated stormwater. Due to this improvement, the bacteria levels in the Narragansett have dropped by around 50%. The Providence Combined Sewer Overflow Abatement Program is the largest public-works project in Rhode Island History and is working to make the Narragansett Bay cleaner and healthier.
