= Starvegoat Island =

Island in Providence County, Rhode Island, United States

Coordinates: 41.78607°N 71.38212°W

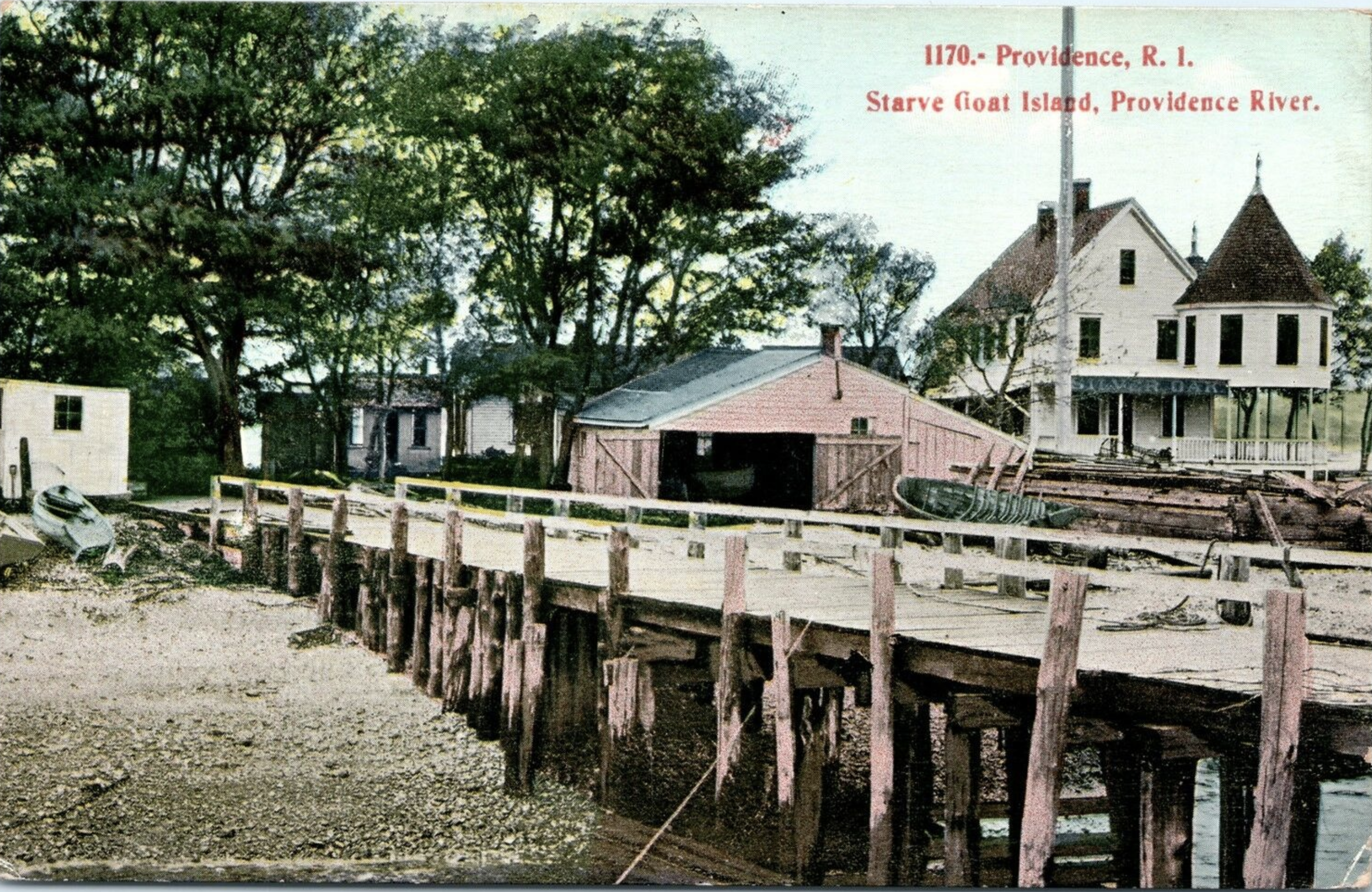
Postcard of Starve Goat Island, circa 1912

Starvegoat Island (or Starve Goat Island) was a small island in the Providence River, Providence, Rhode Island. The island also appears as "Sunshine Island" on the 1927 North American datum map produced by the US Army Corps of Engineers 30th Battalion. The island was the southeasternmost point in the city of Providence. During the 19th and early 20th centuries, it was known for its oystering. It was located off the coast of Fields Point until the passage between them was filled in during the 1950s and 1960s when the area was used as a land fill. The approximate location of the island is now an educational center for Save the Bay, and one of its features is the re-creation of a natural coastal buffer zone.
