= Reservoir Avenue Sewage Pumping Station =

- U.S. National Register of Historic Places
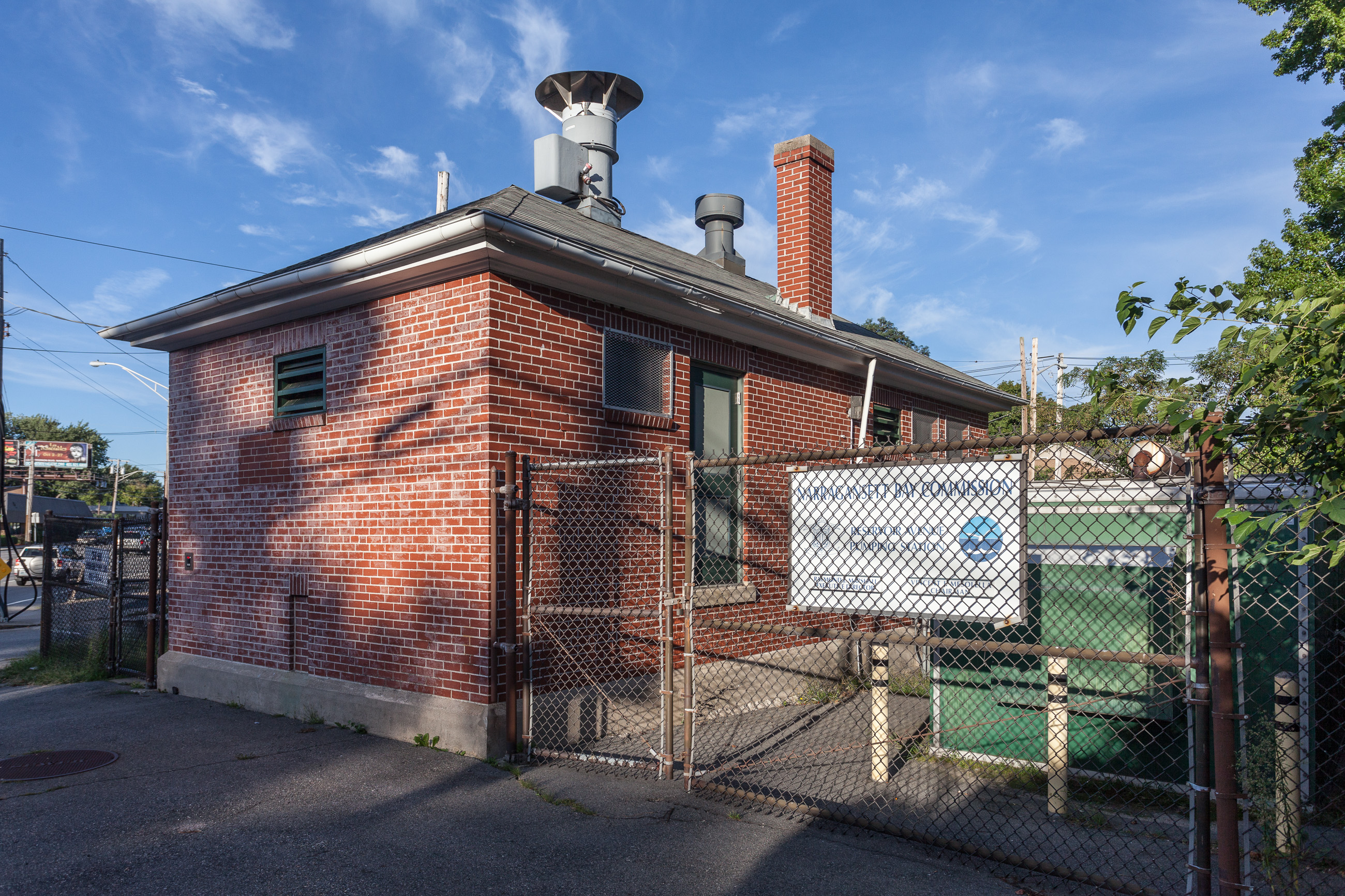
- The station in 2013

- Location within Rhode Island Location within the United States
- Location: Providence, Rhode Island
- Coordinates: 41°47′15″N 71°25′56″W
- Built: 1931
- Architect: Office of City Engineer, Providence
- Architectural style: Colonial Revival, Other
- MPS: Public Works and Utilities--Sewage Treatment Facilities in Providence, 1895--1935 TR
- NRHP reference No.: 88003108
- Added to NRHP: January 13, 1989

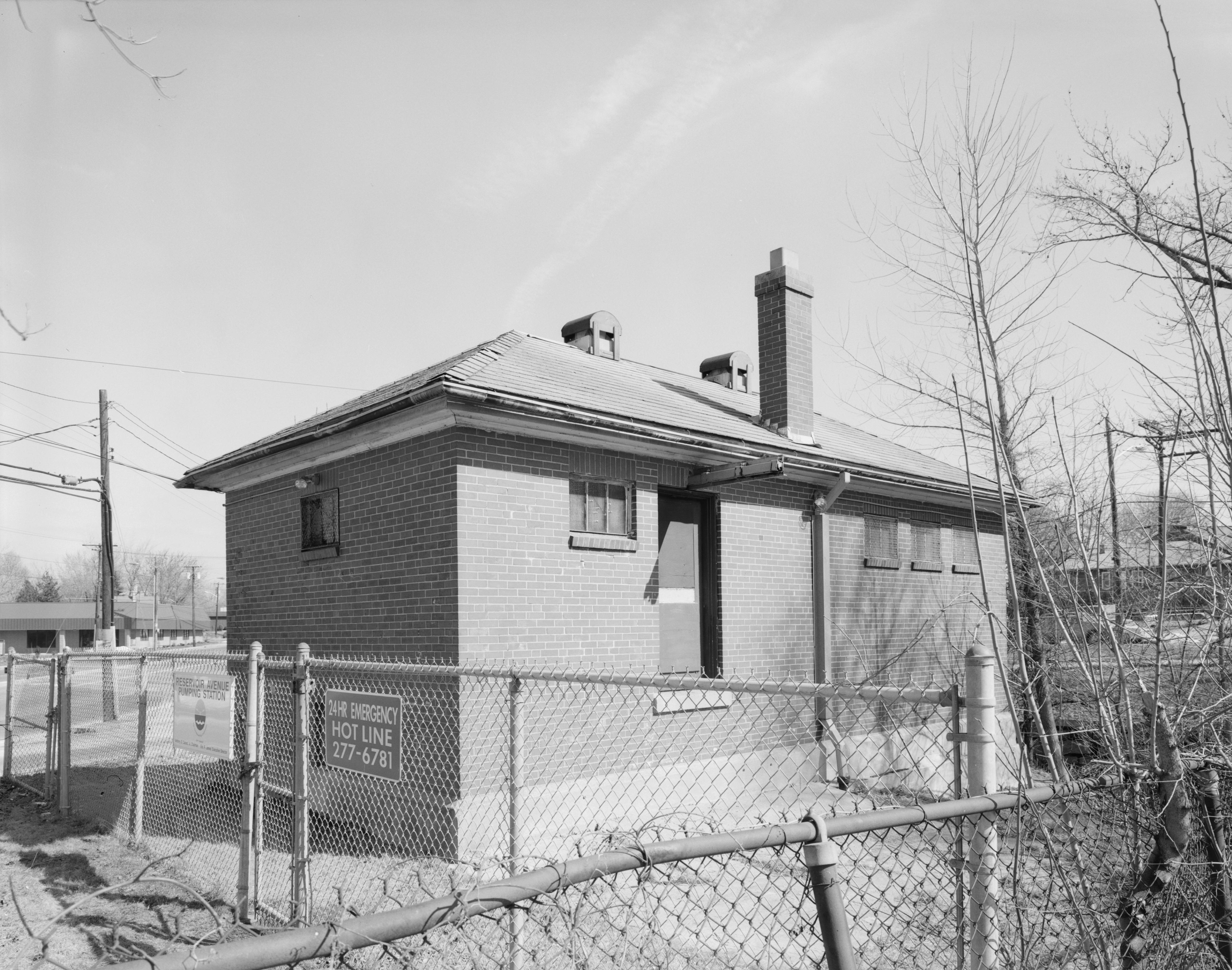
The station in a historic image.

The Reservoir Avenue Sewage Pumping Station is an historic wastewater pumping facility on the south side of the junction of Reservoir and Pontiac Avenues in southern Providence, Rhode Island. From the street it looks like a single-story brick structure with a hip roof, and metal doorways on its north and east elevations. This building stands atop a substantial concrete substructure, which houses a dry well and wet well. The dry well, on the eastern side, houses the pumps, while the wet well, occupies the western two-thirds of the facility. The floor of the interior includes glass blocks for viewing the facilities below, as well as metal trapdoors for accessing the pumps. Manual gate valves on the west side are used to control sewage flow through the west well. This facility is used to pump raw sewage eastward and uphill to a gravity conduit in Rutherglen Avenue. This conduit carries the sewage to the Field's Point treatment facility. The pumping station was built by the city of Providence in 1931, and is now owned by the Narragansett Bay Commission, which operates the region's wastewater treatment facilities.

The facility was listed on the National Register of Historic Places in 1989.

== See also ==
- National Register of Historic Places listings in Providence, Rhode Island
