= Office of City Engineer, Providence =

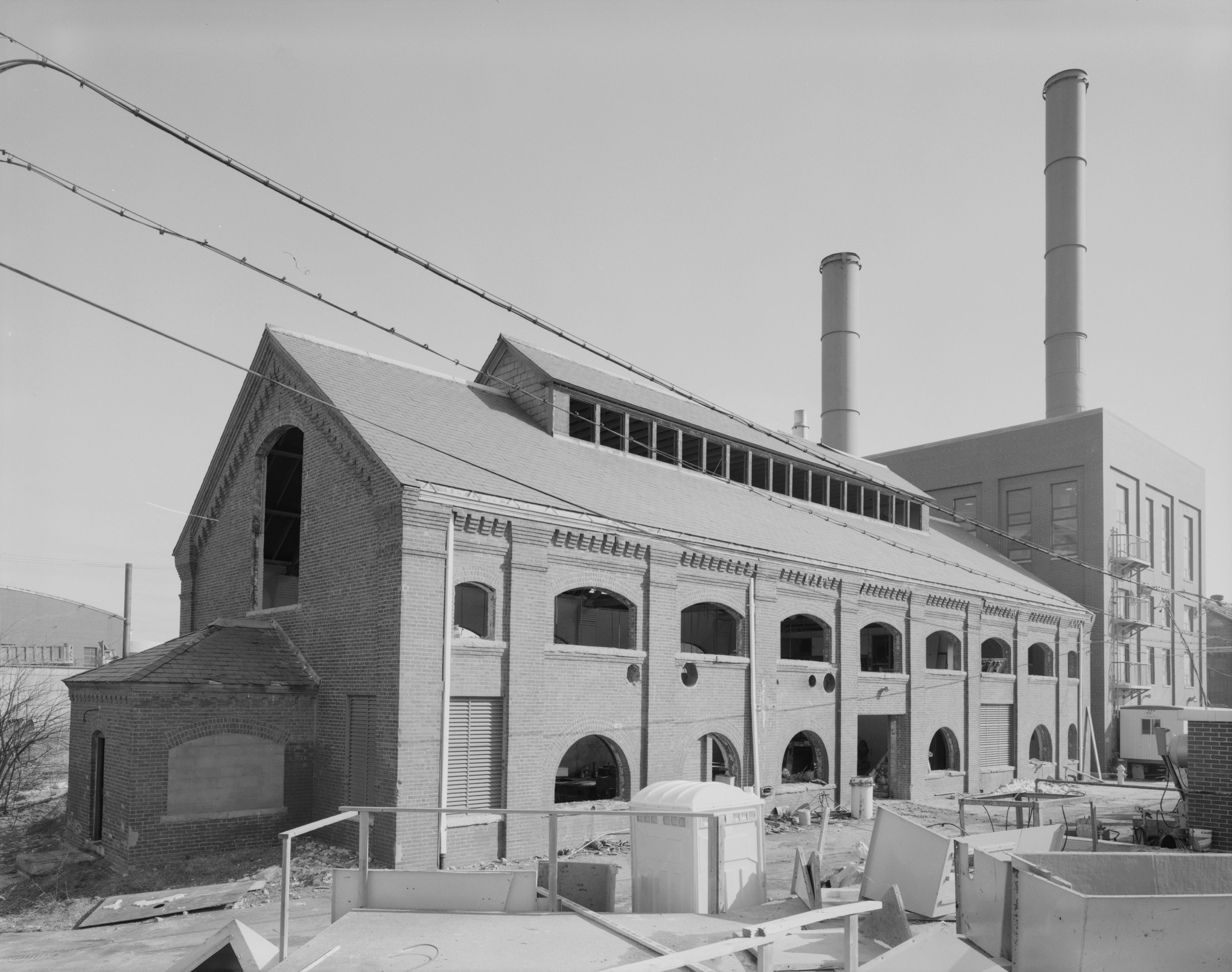
Chemical Building, Field's Point Wastewater Treatment Facility

The Office of City Engineer of Providence, Rhode Island is an office that is credited with the design of a number of notable public works.

Its Chemical Building, for example, was built in 1900 and displays Late Victorian architecture.

A number of its works are listed on the National Register of Historic Places.

== Works ==
Its works, all in Providence, include:

- Chemical Building, Fields Point Sewage Treatment Plant, Ernest St. at Fields Point, (Office of City Engineer, Providence), NRHP-listed
- Ernest Street Sewage Pumping Station, Ernest and Ellis Sts., (Office of City Engineer, Providence), NRHP-listed
- Reservoir Avenue Sewage Pumping Station, Reservoir and Pontiac Aves., (Office of City Engineer, Providence), NRHP-listed
- Return Sludge Pumping Station, Fields Point Sewage Treatment Plant, Ernest St., (Office of City Engineer, Providence), NRHP-listed
- Sludge Press House, Fields Point Sewage Treatment Plant, Ernest St. at Fields Point, (Office of City Engineer, Providence), NRHP-listed
- Washington Park Sewage Pumping Station, Shipyard St., (Office of City Engineer, Providence), NRHP-listed
