= Ernest Street Sewage Pumping Station =

- U.S. National Register of Historic Places
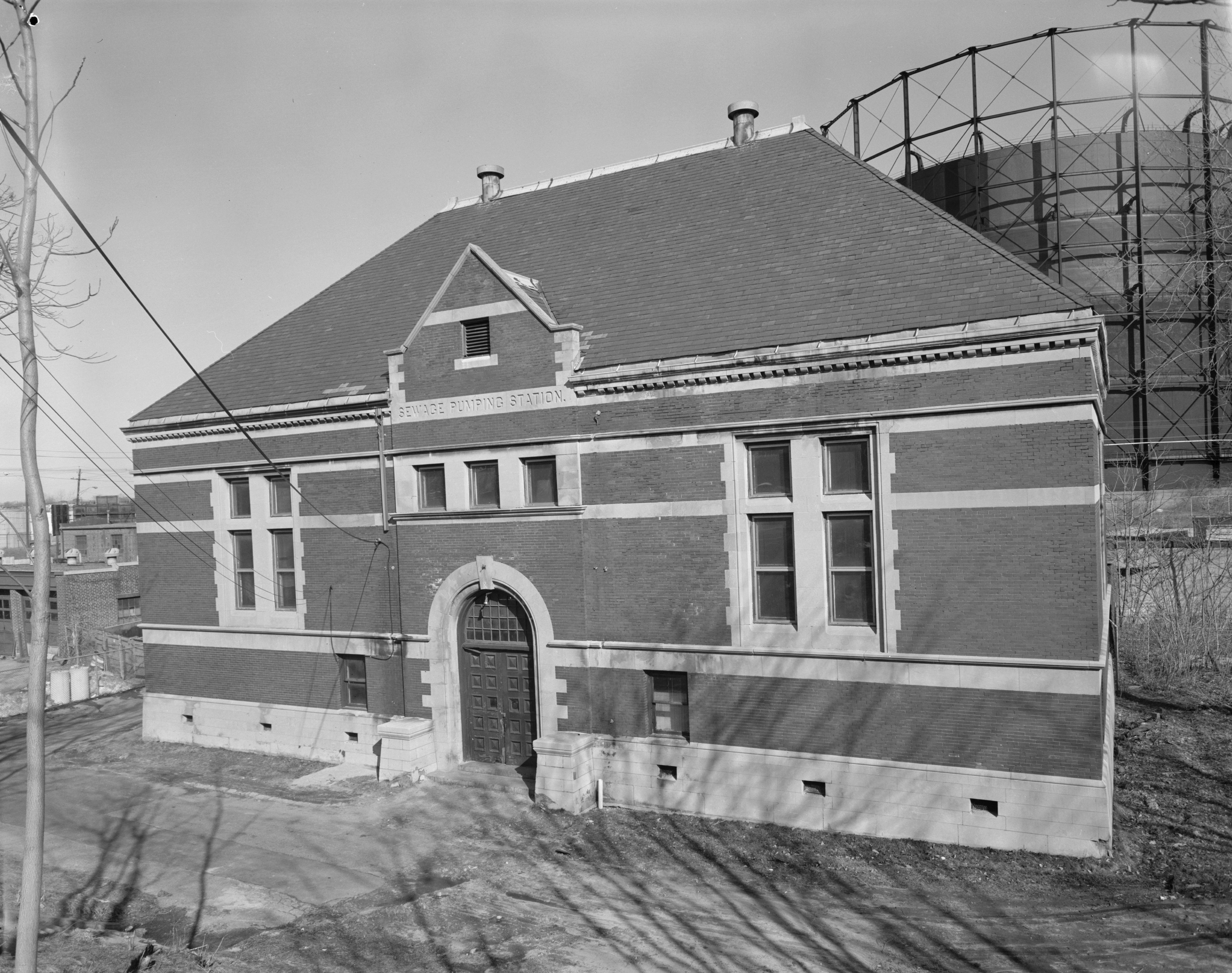

- Location within Rhode Island Location within the United States
- Location: Providence, Rhode Island
- Coordinates: 41°47′42″N 71°23′52″W
- Area: 1 acre (0.40 ha)
- Built: 1897
- Architect: Office of City Engineer, Providence
- Architectural style: Colonial Revival
- MPS: Public Works and Utilities--Sewage Treatment Facilities in Providence, 1895--1935 TR
- NRHP reference No.: 88003103
- Added to NRHP: January 13, 1989

The Ernest Street Sewage Pumping Station is an historic wastewater pumping station at Ernest and Ellis Streets near the wastewater treatment facility at Field's Point in Providence, Rhode Island. The surviving elements of the station include a main pumphouse and a smaller screening house, both built in 1897-98 as part of a major effort to modernize Providence's sewage treatment facilities. A third structure, a boiler house, was demolished in 1987, and a tall smokestack was taken down in the 1930s.

The main pumphouse is a tall single-story brick structure with a hip roof and Colonial Revival features, and is set near Ernest Street, a short way east of its junction with Allens Avenue. The screening house is a smaller square structure, also with a hip roof, set behind and to the right of the pumphouse. The facility is used to pump raw sewage through an 88-inch main to the treatment facility.

The property was listed on the National Register of Historic Places in 1989.

== Gallery ==
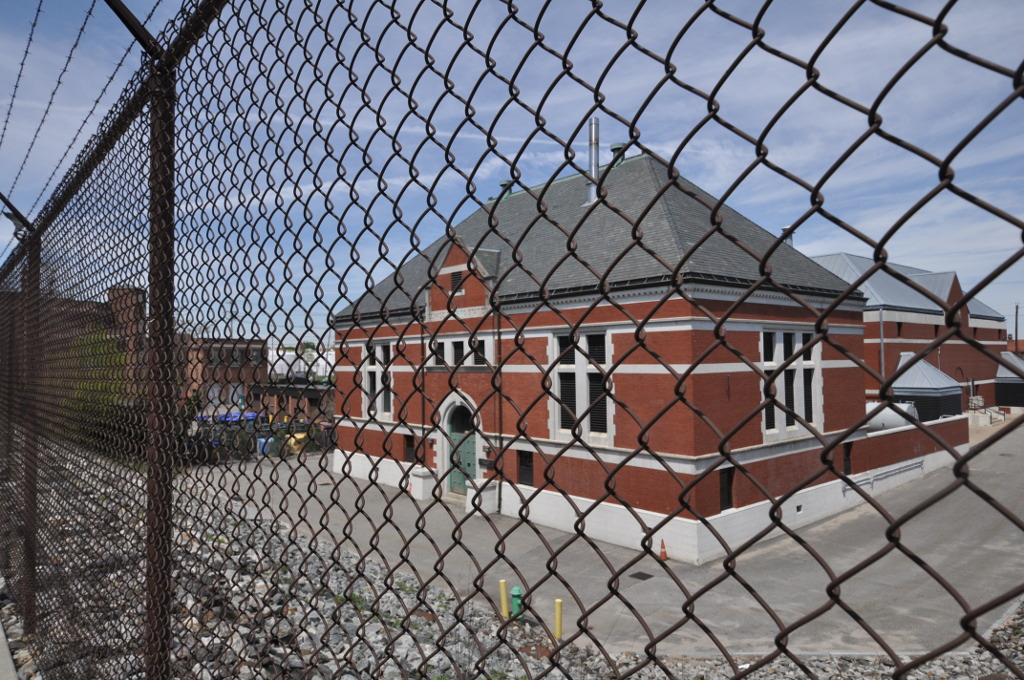
Ernest Street Pumping Station, Rhode Island

== See also ==
- National Register of Historic Places listings in Providence, Rhode Island
