= Washington Park Sewage Pumping Station =

- U.S. National Register of Historic Places
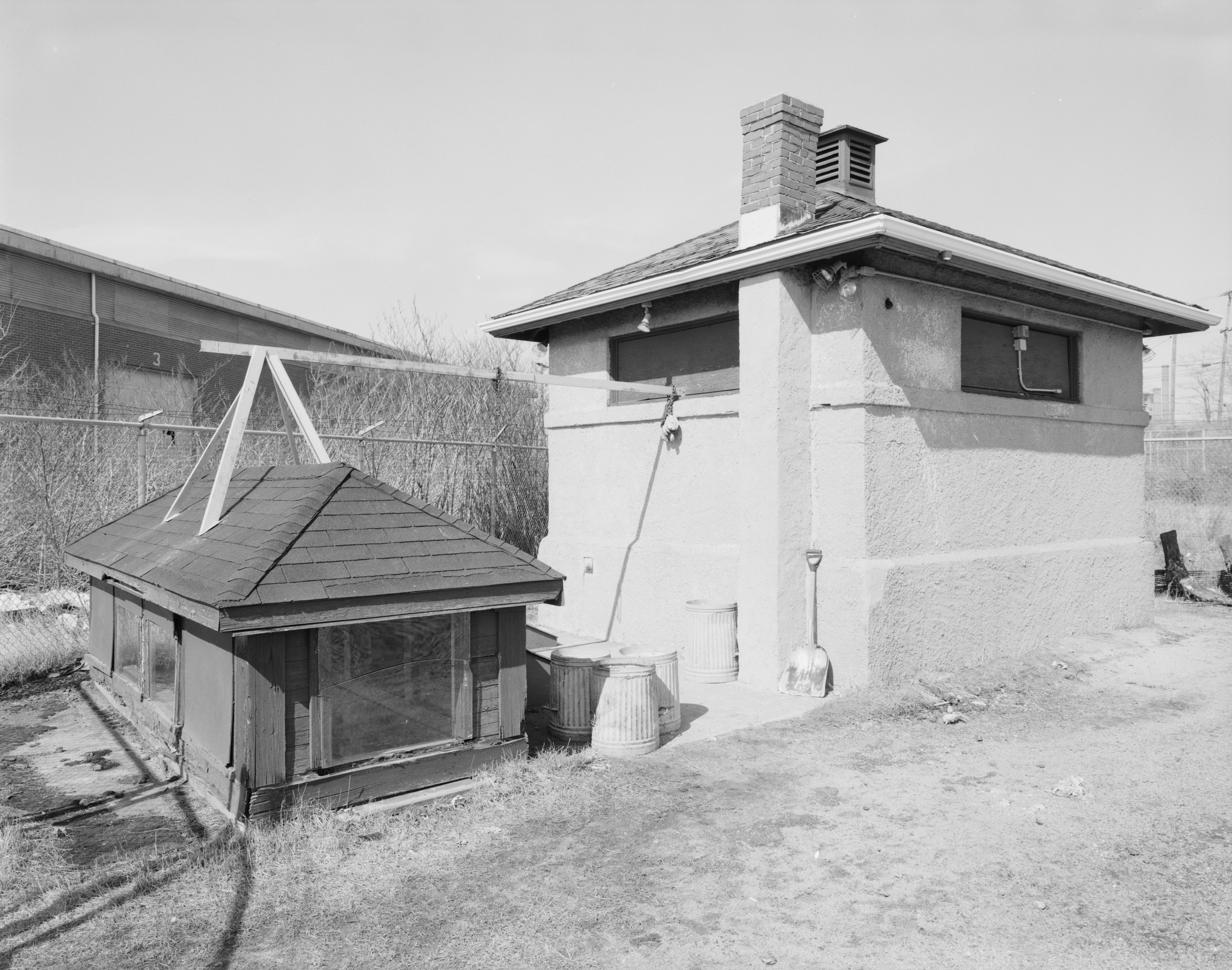

- Location within Rhode Island Location within the United States
- Location: Providence, Rhode Island
- Coordinates: 41°47′29″N 71°23′24″W
- Built: 1912
- Architect: Office of City Engineer, Providence
- Architectural style: Late 19th and 20th Century Revivals
- MPS: Public Works and Utilities--Sewage Treatment Facilities in Providence, 1895–1935 TR
- NRHP reference No.: 88003107
- Added to NRHP: January 13, 1989

The Washington Park Sewage Pumping Station is an historic wastewater pumping facility in Providence, Rhode Island. Its principal visible component is a concrete block structure, finished in stucco and topped by a hip roof, which is about 16 by 16 feet (4.9 m × 4.9 m). This building stands atop a large cast-in-place concrete well, in which pumps and gate valves are housed. The facility was built in 1911 to pump raw sewage from the low-lying Washington Park area to the Field's Point wastewater treatment facility, which lies about 1,000 feet (300 m) to the north. The pump station is located well back from the street, behind a low brick distribution facility. It was added to the National Register of Historic Places in 1989.

== History ==
The Washington Park Sewage Pumping Station was designed under the supervision of Otis F. Clapp, the then-current Office of City Engineer for Providence. The construction was also overseen by Frederick O. Clapp, Assistant Engineer.

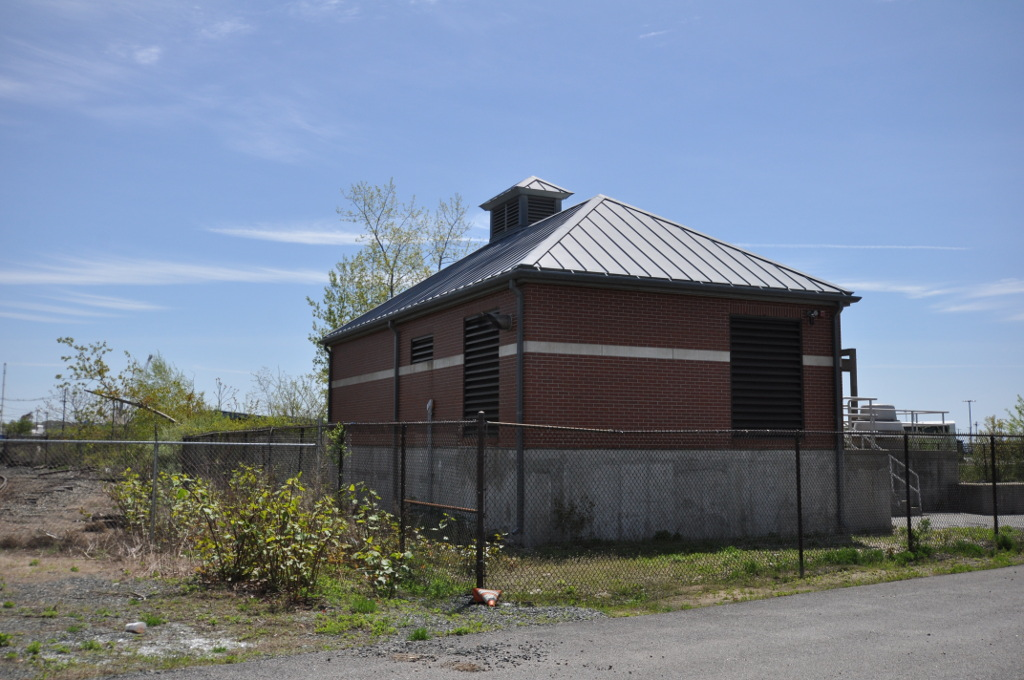
Photo, 2017

The pump serves an area of roughly 83 acres (34 ha) with the intention to serve up to six thousand residents and storm drainage needs. The sewer system for the Washington Park district was ordered on July 31, 1912, and completed by October 16, 1913. By the end of 1913, the sewer system leading to the pump system comprised about 3.25 miles (5.2 km) of regular sewers and 0.75 miles (1.2 km) of storm drain sewers with another 0.25 miles (0.4 km) of sewer between the pump and the Field's Point plant.

In 1915, it was estimated that 17,000,000 US gallons (64,000,000 L) of sewage was pumped by the pumping station. About 225 houses were connected to the sewer system that lead to the pumping station, but it was reported that due to the sewer system that it furthered the demand for "higher quality homes" in the area.

== Significance ==
The Washington Park Sewage Pumping Station is historically significant as part of Providence's community planning and development in regards to the processing and treatment of sewage for the growing city. Re-annexed by Providence in 1868, the Washington Park area remained largely undeveloped until public transportation made the area accessible. Continuous residential growth from the late 1890s into the 1930s required the extension of the sewage system. It is a representative example of city planning for sewage treatment with a longstanding functionality with its structural integrity. The facility was listed on the National Register of Historic Places in 1989.

== See also ==
- National Register of Historic Places listings in Providence, Rhode Island
