= Fields Point =

Historic park in Rhode Island, US

Coordinates: 41°47′16.27″N 71°22′58.53″W

Thomas Field's house, ca. 1690, on Fields Point, a vernacular stone-ender that is now demolished.

Fields Point (also spelled Field's Point) is a historic park in the Washington Park neighbourhood of Providence, Rhode Island jutting into Narragansett Bay near the Providence River and Route 95.

== History ==
The point was named after William Field, a British colonist who settled in Providence with an acreage and house on what is now South Main Street. In the 19th century, Fields Point Farm, a 37-acre (15 ha) park, became the city's major recreational area until Roger Williams Park was created in 1871. Visitors came to the point to visit Colonel Atwell's Clam House, Edgewood Beach, The Washington Park Yacht Club, and Kerwin's Beach.

Following the attack on Pearl Harbor in December 1941, the US Maritime Commission selected Fields Point as a location for a shipyard as part of the Emergency Shipbuilding Program. Much of the existing structures were removed for wartime construction. The yard was eventually taken over by the Walsh-Kaiser Company. Throughout the 1950s and 1960s, one of the piers of the former shipyard was used to house a US Naval Reserve center, with the submarine USS Lionfish berthed there as a training vessel from 1960 until circa 1970; it is now preserved a few miles away at Battleship Cove, Fall River, Massachusetts. The facility is now a (combined Army, Navy, Marine) Armed Forces Reserve Center.

In the 1950s, Providence started using Fields Point as a landfill, eventually connecting it with nearby Starve Goat Island. In the 1960s, entrepreneur Melvin Berry started "bar, marina, swim club, amusement park, bowling alley, drive-in theatre, indoor ice skating rink and a nightly Hawaiian dance show" in Fields Point. In the mid-to-late 1960s, Fields Point was also used as an operations base for high-speed testing between Westerly and Boston of the gas-turbine Turbo Train, and later served as a storage site for the trainsets after September 1976.

In 1973, Johnson & Wales University established a facility in Fields Point; by 2001, the university leased land to Save The Bay for an educational center. In late 2012, a three-turbine wind farm was installed at Fields Point to provide energy for the wastewater treatment plant.

== See also ==
- Chemical Building, Fields Point Sewage Treatment Plant
- Return Sludge Pumping Station, Fields Point Sewage Treatment Plant
