= Chemical Building, Fields Point Sewage Treatment Plant =

- Chemical Building, Field's Point Wastewater Treatment Facility
- U.S. National Register of Historic Places
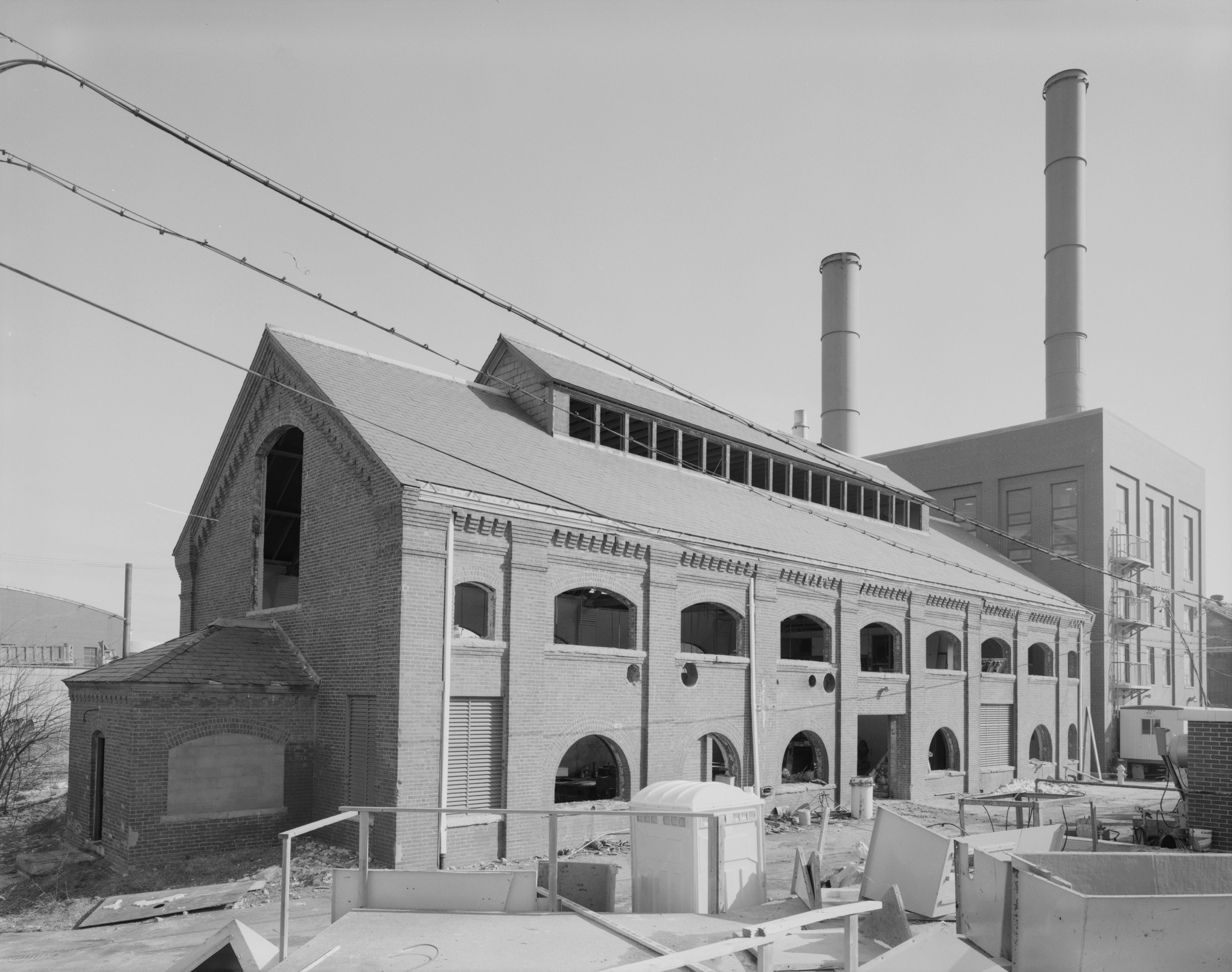
- 1930s HABS view of the building

- Location within Rhode Island Location within the United States
- Location: Field Point Sewage Treatment Facility, Providence, Rhode Island
- Coordinates: 41°47′40″N 71°23′26″W
- Built: 1900
- Architect: Office of City Engineer, Providence
- Architectural style: Late Victorian
- MPS: Public Works and Utilities-Sewage Treatment Facilities in Providence, 1895-1935 TR
- NRHP reference No.: 88003106
- Added to NRHP: January 13, 1989

The Chemical Building is a historic wastewater treatment building at Field's Point Wastewater Treatment Facility in Providence, Rhode Island. Built in 1900–01, it is one of the two oldest buildings at Providence's main sewage treatment facility. It is a 2-1/2 story brick structure measuring 103 feet (31 m) by 38 feet (12 m). The long facades are divided into 9 bays, separated by brick piers. When originally built, the structure had a concrete first floor, a wooden second floor, and a loft area accessed by catwalks, and was used to hold and deliver chemicals used to neutralize the wastewater arriving via the Ernest Street Sewage Pumping Station. In the 1930s the plant was converted to use an active sludge process, and the interior of the building was altered to be a single large chamber.

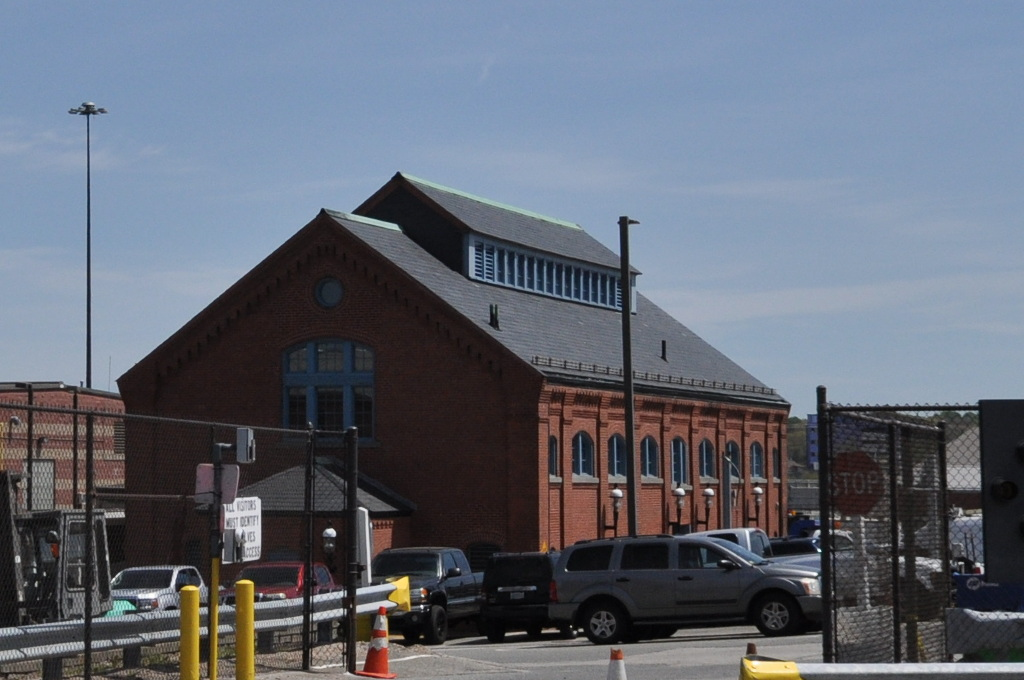
A more recent view

The building was listed on the National Register of Historic Places in 1989.

== See also ==
- National Register of Historic Places listings in Providence, Rhode Island
