= Providence, Rhode Island =

Capital city of Rhode Island, US

Providence
- State capital
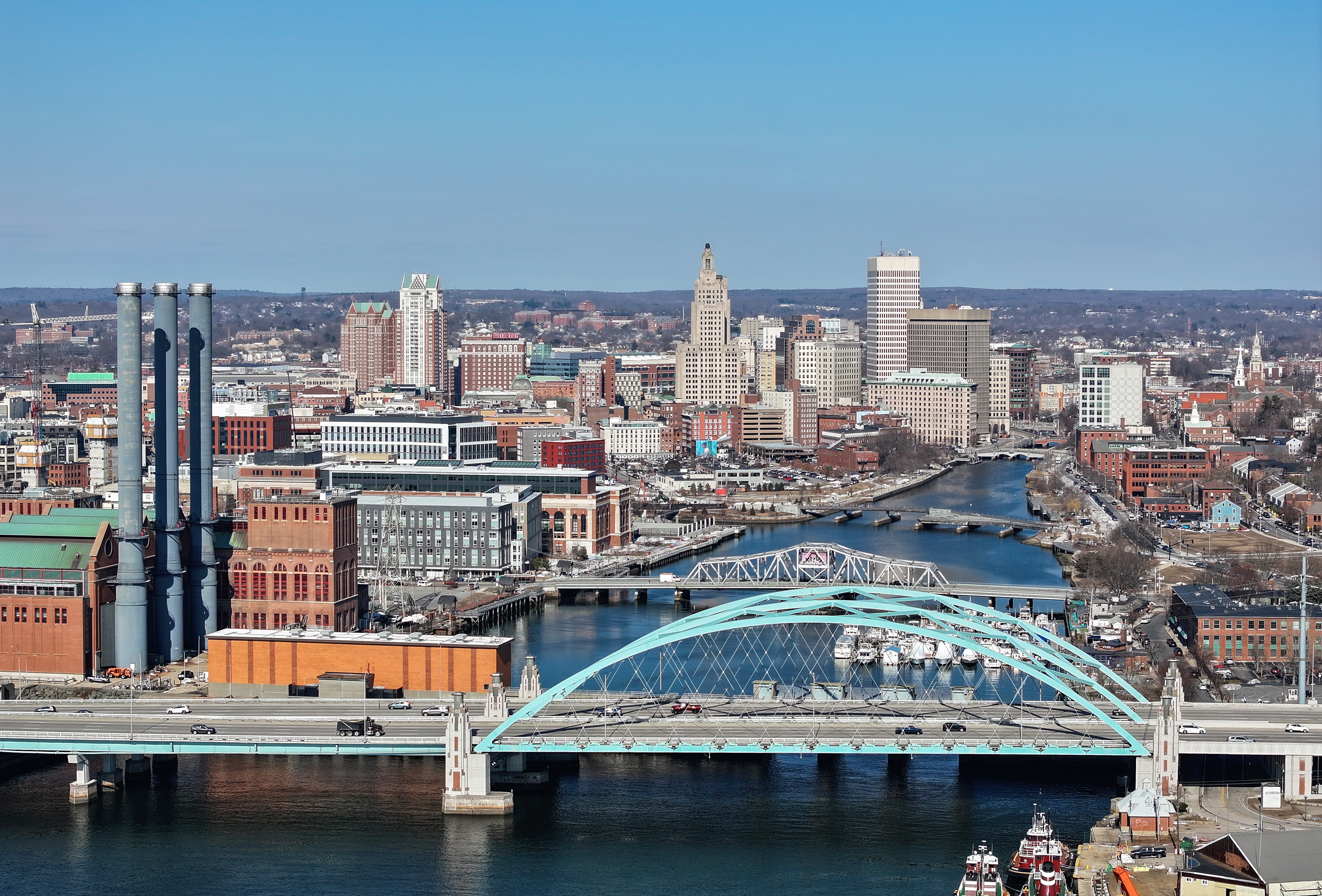
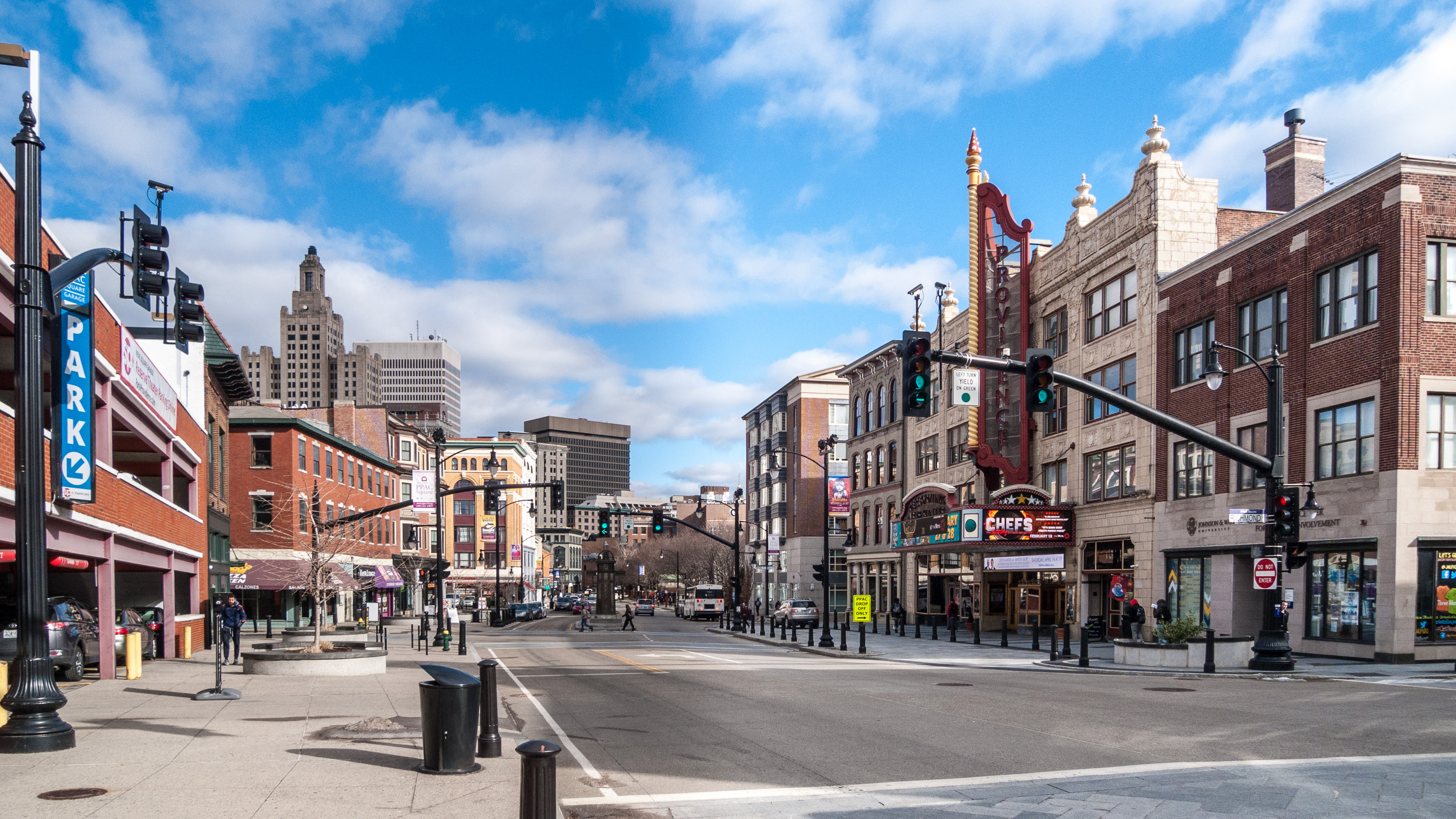
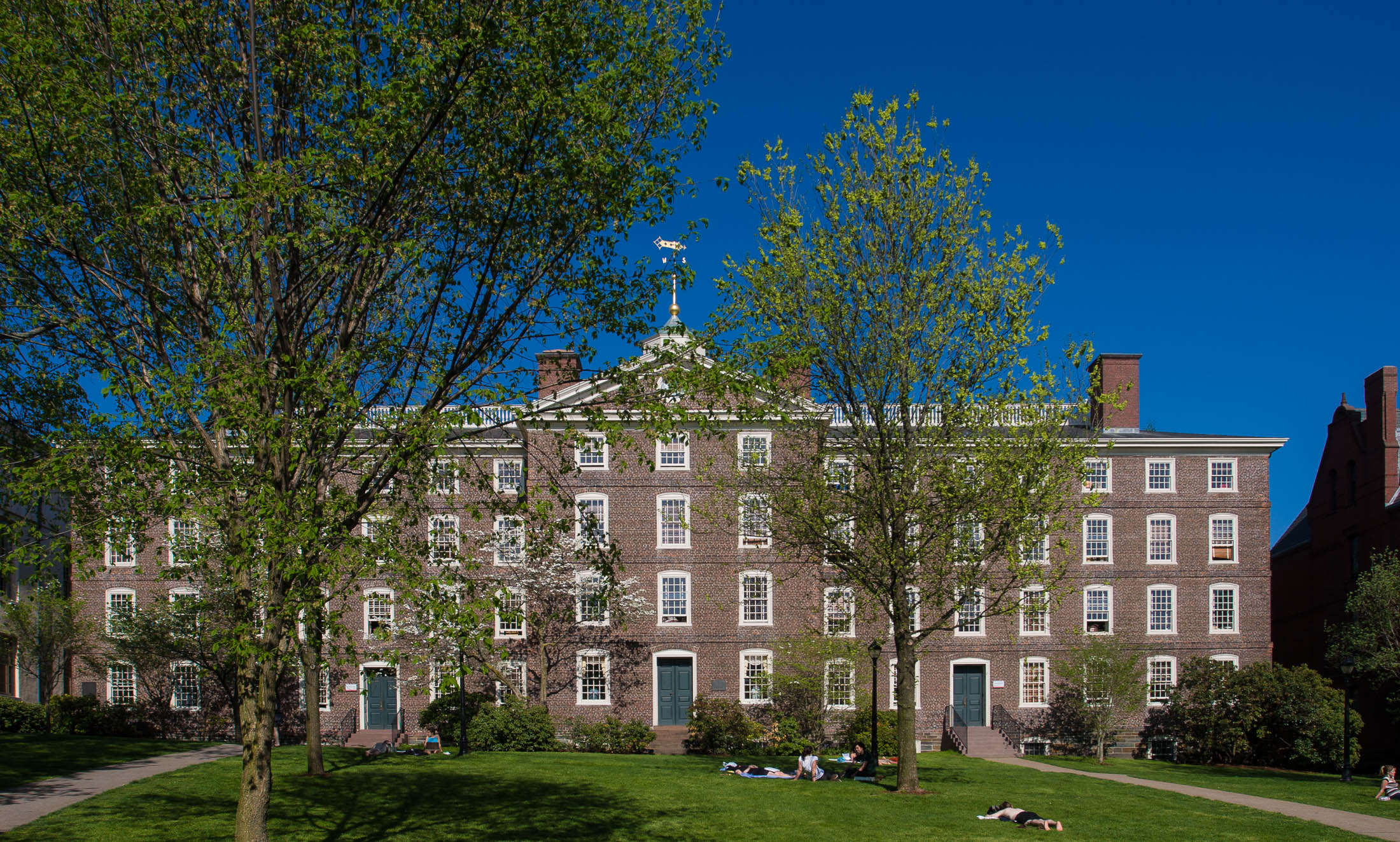
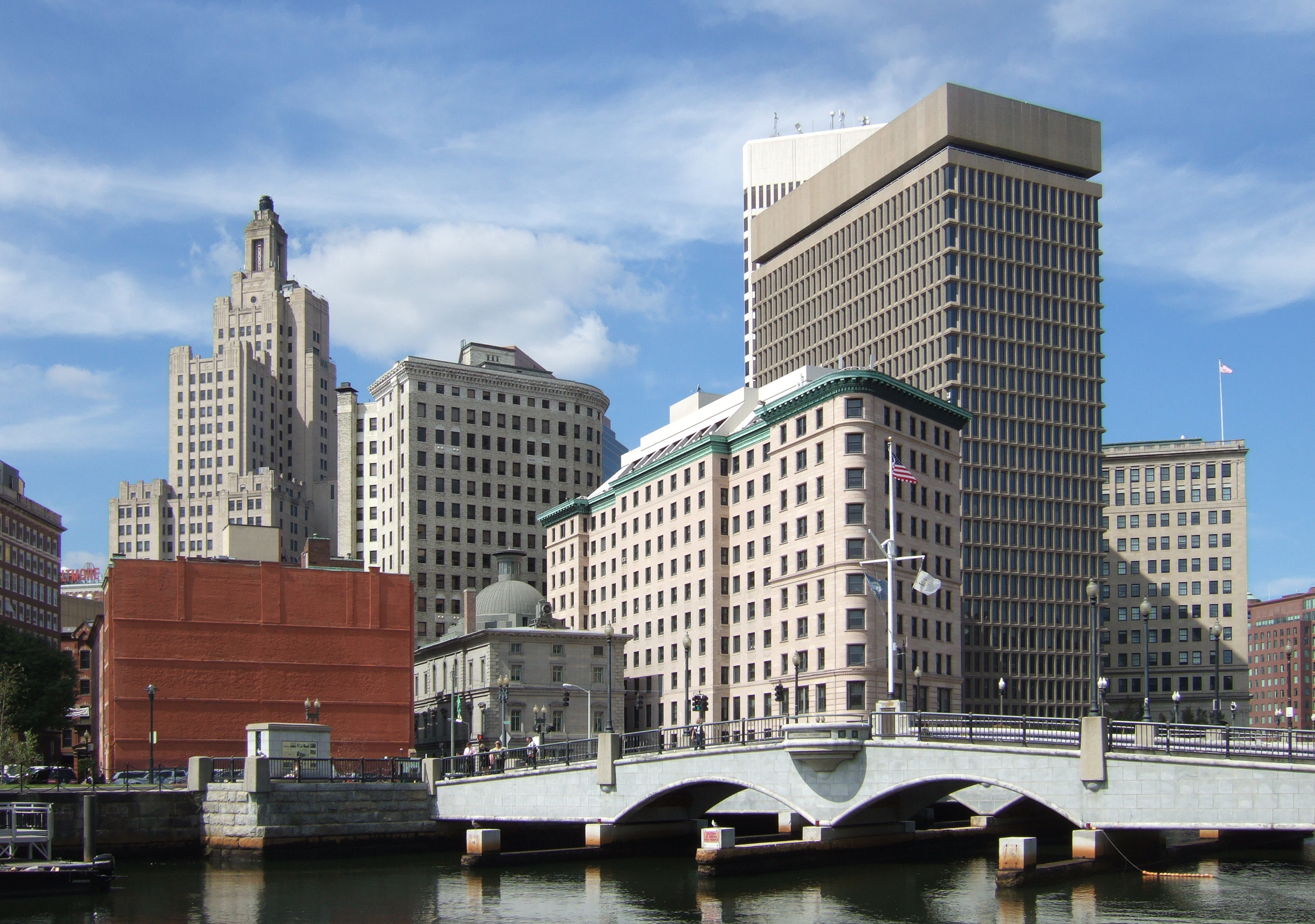
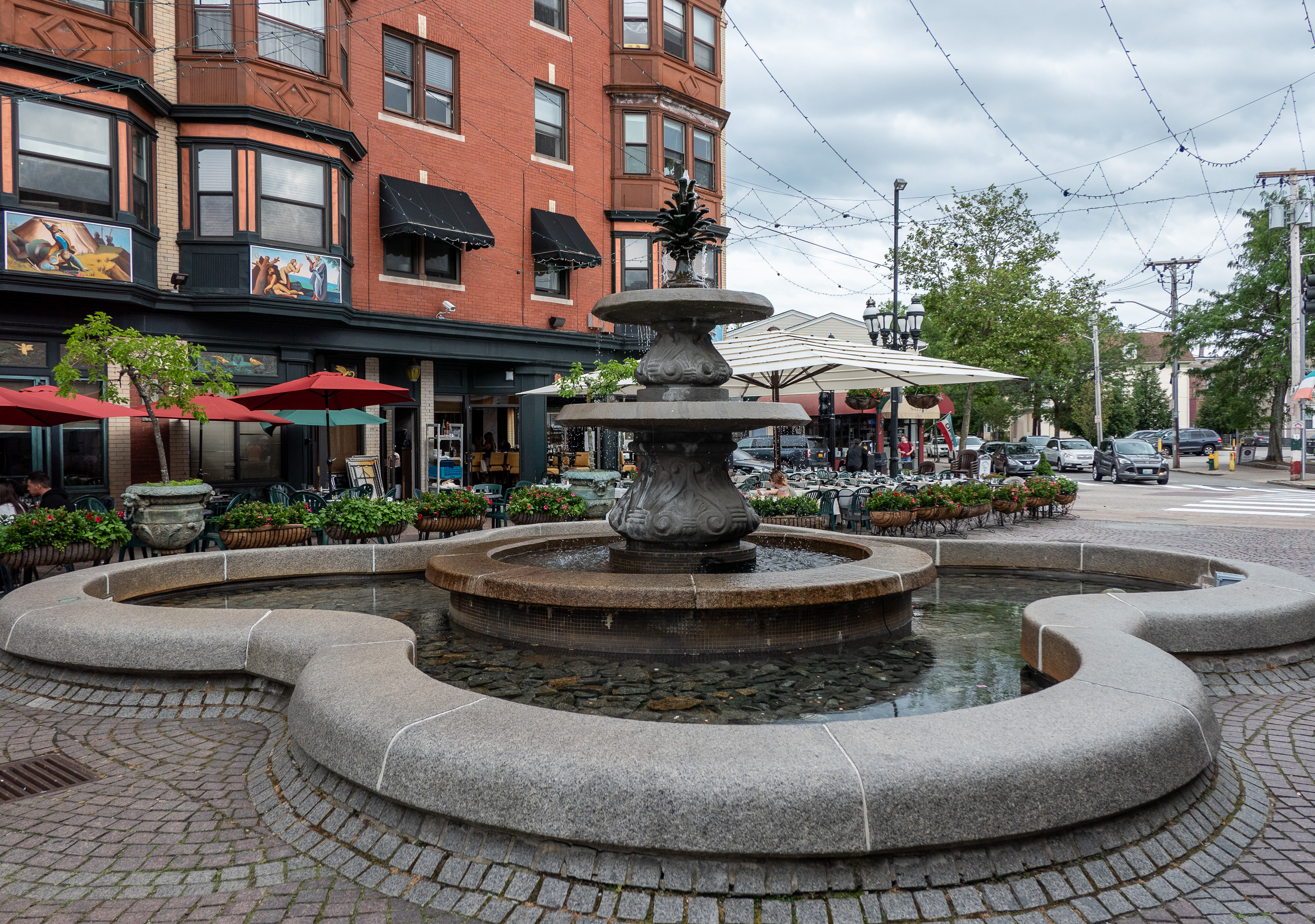
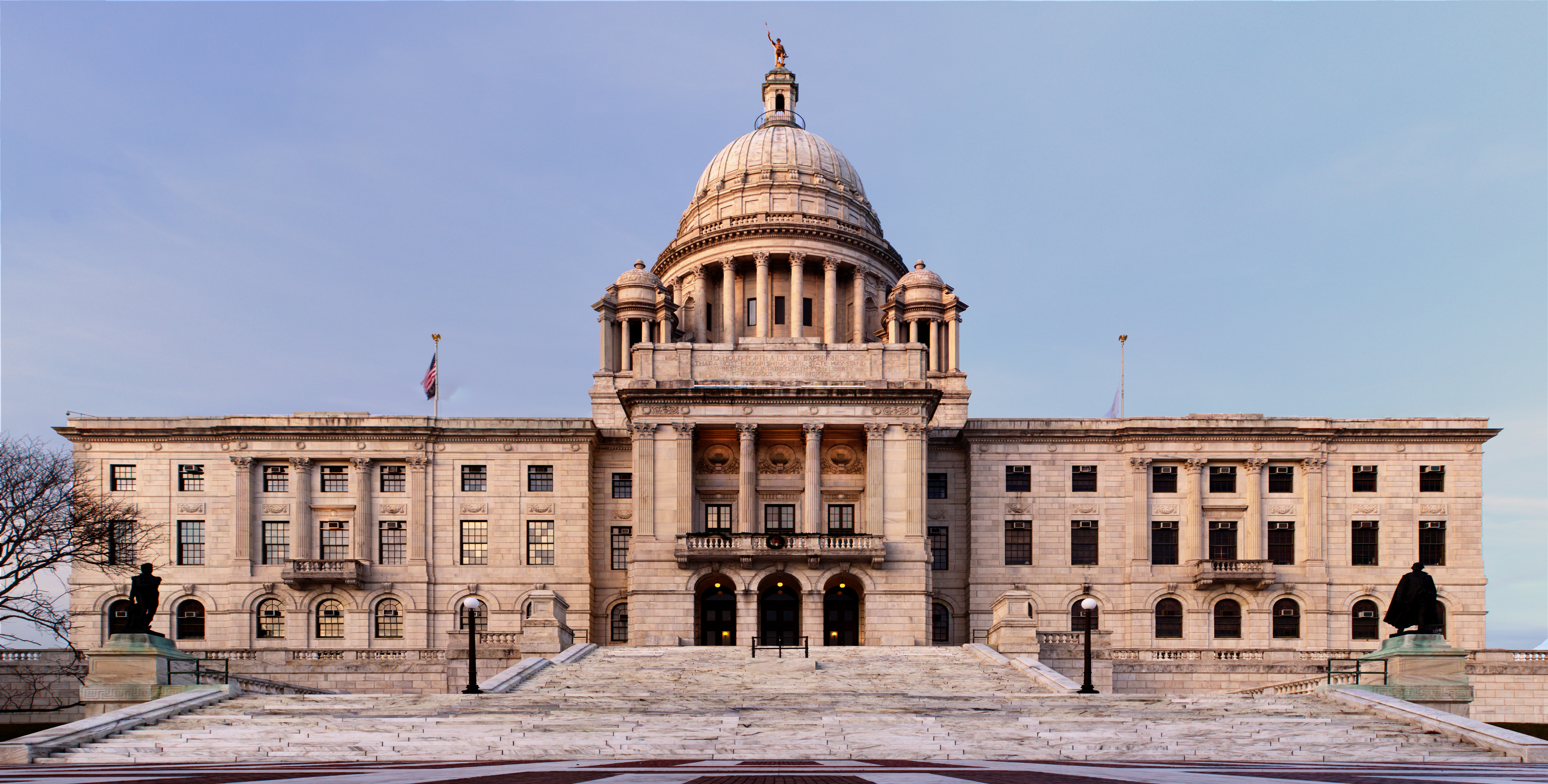
- Downtown Providence skyline Weybosset Street University Hall Crawford Street Bridge Federal Hill Rhode Island State House

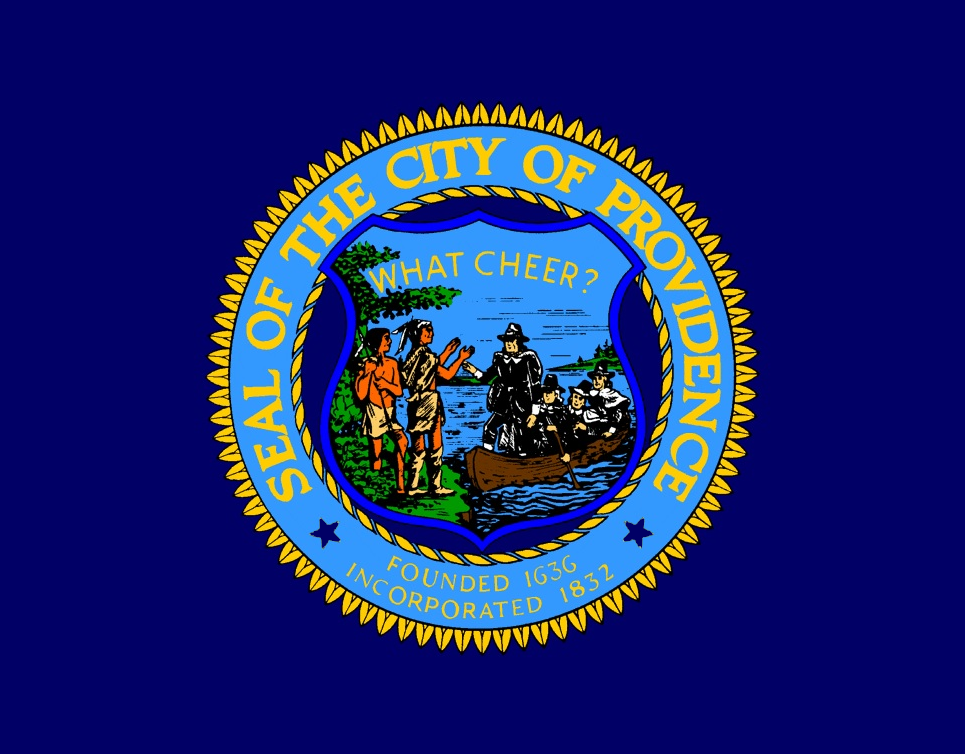
- Flag Seal
- Nicknames: The Creative Capital, the Renaissance City, the Divine City, PVD, Prov
- Motto: "What Cheer?" (Note: This motto may appear rhetorical, but it was an earnest expression from the traditional account of Roger Williams' arrival in Rhode Island with settlers William Harris, John Smith, Joshua Verin, Thomas Angell, and Francis Wickes. The party was greeted by a group of Narragansetts, with the description of their exchange: Not far from that bridge [over the Blackstone] in a little cove is the famous "Slate Rock", on which it is said that Roger Williams first landed after his tedious and painful flight from the persecutions of his Massachusetts brethren. As he approached the place he was saluted by some friendly Indians with the peaceful enquiry "What Cheer netop?" netop, meaning friend, a phrase which they had acquired from their intercourse with the English and which was equivalent to the salutation "How are you?" or "What's the news?"... It is this incident which is pictured upon the seal of the city of Providence.)
- Interactive map of Providence
- Location within the United States Location within Rhode Island
- Coordinates: 41°49′25″N 71°25′20″W
- Country: United States
- State: Rhode Island
- County: Providence
- Region: New England
- Settled: 1636
- Incorporated (city): November 5, 1832
- Founder: Roger Williams
- Named for: Divine providence

Government
  - Type: Mayor–council
  - Body: Providence City Council
  - Mayor: Brett Smiley (D)

Area
  - State capital: 20.58 sq mi (53.31 km^{2})
  - Land: 18.41 sq mi (47.67 km^{2})
  - Water: 2.18 sq mi (5.64 km^{2})
- Elevation: 10 ft (3.0 m)

Population (2020)
  - State capital: 190,934
  - Rank: US: 133rd
  - Density: 10,373.5/sq mi (4,005.25/km^{2})
  - Urban: 1,285,806 (US: 39th)
  - Urban density: 2,363/sq mi (912.2/km^{2})
  - Metro: 1,700,901 (US: 39th)
- Demonym: Providentian

GDP
  - Metro: $111.840 billion (2023)
- Time zone: UTC−05:00 (EST)
  - Summer (DST): UTC−04:00 (EDT)
- ZIP Codes: 02901–02912, 02918-02919, 02940
- Area code: 401
- FIPS code: 44-59000
- GNIS feature IDs: 1219851
- Website: providenceri.gov

Providence (/ˈprɒvɪdəns/) is the capital and most populous city of the U.S. state of Rhode Island. It is the third-most populous city in New England, with a population of 190,934 at the 2020 census. The Providence metropolitan area extends into Massachusetts and has approximately 1.7 million residents, making it the 39th-largest metropolitan area in the U.S. It is the county seat of Providence County.

Providence is one of the oldest cities in New England, founded in 1636 by Reformed Baptist theologian Roger Williams, a religious exile from the Massachusetts Bay Colony. He named the area in honor of "God's merciful Providence" which he believed was responsible for revealing such a haven for him and his followers. The city developed as a busy port, as it is situated at the mouth of the Providence River at the head of Narragansett Bay.

Providence was one of the first cities in the country to industrialize and became noted for its textile manufacturing and subsequent machine tool, jewelry, and silverware industries. Today, the city of Providence is home to eight hospitals and eight institutions of higher learning which have shifted the city's economy into service industries, though it still retains some manufacturing activity.

== History ==
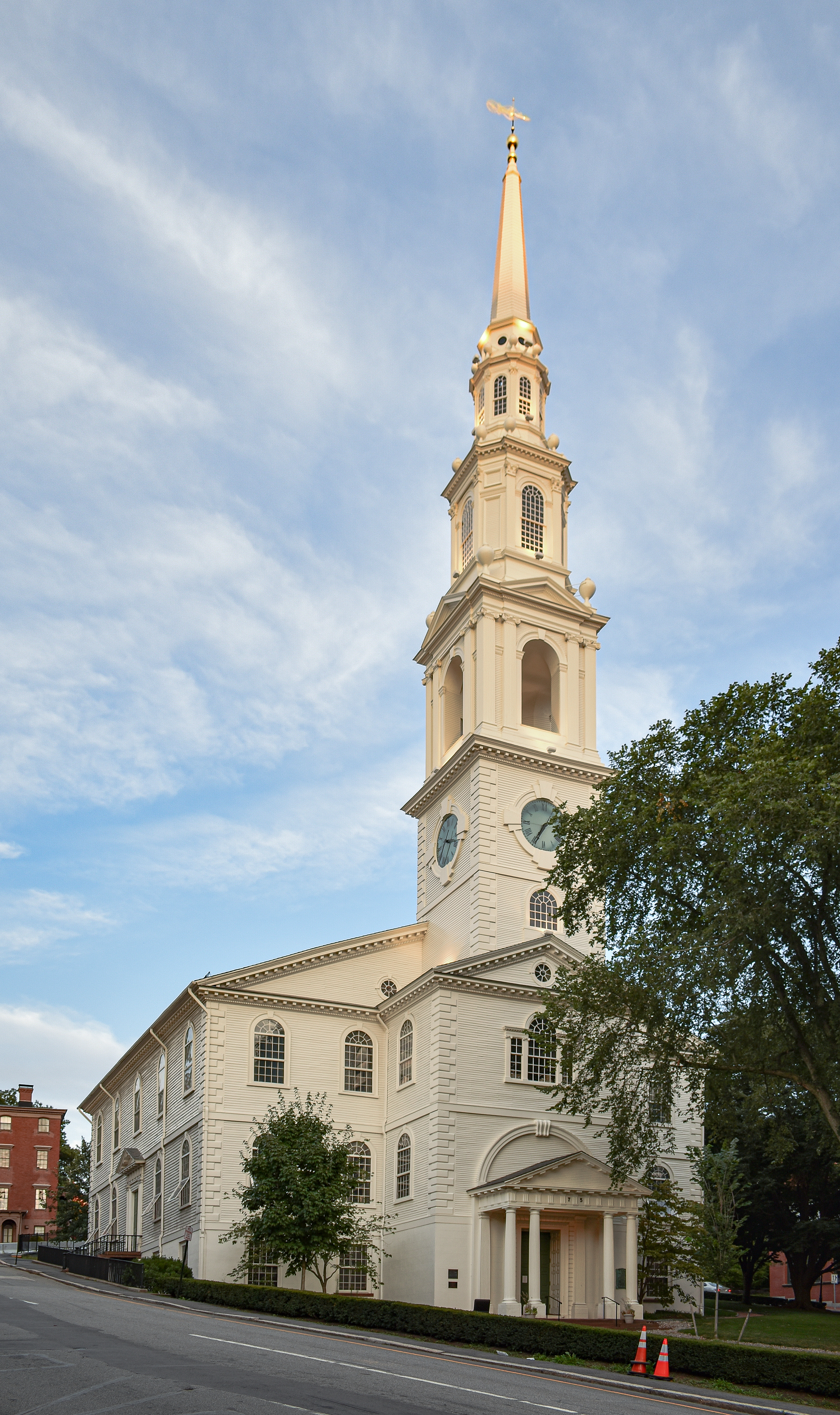
The First Baptist Church in America is the oldest Baptist congregation in America, founded by Roger Williams in 1638. Its present meetinghouse was first occupied in 1775.

Providence was settled in June 1636 by Puritan theologian Roger Williams and grew into one of the original Thirteen Colonies. As a minister in the Massachusetts Bay Colony, Williams had advocated the separation of church and state and condemned colonists' confiscation of land from the Indians. For these and other "diverse, new, and dangerous opinions," he was convicted of sedition and heresy and banished from the colony. Williams and others established a settlement in Rumford, Rhode Island. The group later moved down the Seekonk River, around Fox Point and up the Providence River to the confluence of the Moshassuck and Woonasquatucket Rivers. The settlement was named after "God's merciful Providence".

Providence lacked a royal charter, unlike Salem and Boston. The settlers thus organized themselves, allotting tracts on the eastern side of the Providence River in 1638 allowing roughly six acres each. These home lots extended from Towne Street (now South Main Street) to Hope Street. Over the following two decades, Providence Plantations grew into a self-sufficient agricultural and fishing settlement, though its lands were difficult to farm and its borders were disputed with Connecticut and Massachusetts.

In 1652, Providence prohibited indentured servitude for periods of longer than 10 years. This statute constituted the first anti-slavery law in the United States, though there is no evidence the prohibition was ever enforced. However, the Rhode Island General Assembly legalized African and Native American slavery throughout the colony in 1703, and Providence merchants' participation in the slave trade helped turn the city into a major port. By 1755, enslaved people made up 8% of Providence's population, below the 10% average for colonial Rhode Island, but above the 5% average for the northern colonies.

In March 1676, Providence Plantations was burned to the ground by the Narragansetts during King Philip's War. Later in the year, the Rhode Island legislature formally rebuked the other colonies for provoking the war. In 1770, Brown University moved to Providence from nearby Warren. At the time, the college was known as Rhode Island College and occupied a single building on College Hill. The college's choice to relocate to Providence as opposed to Newport symbolized a larger shift away from Newport's commercial and political dominance over the colony.

In 1772, a group from Providence burned a British customs schooner south of Providence in the event known as the Gaspee Affair. This was the first act of armed resistance to British rule in North America, predating the more famous Boston Tea Party by more than a year. Rhode Island was the first of the Thirteen Colonies to renounce its allegiance to the British Crown on May 4, 1776. It was also the last of the Thirteen States to ratify the United States Constitution on May 29, 1790, once assurances were made that a Bill of Rights would become part of the Constitution.

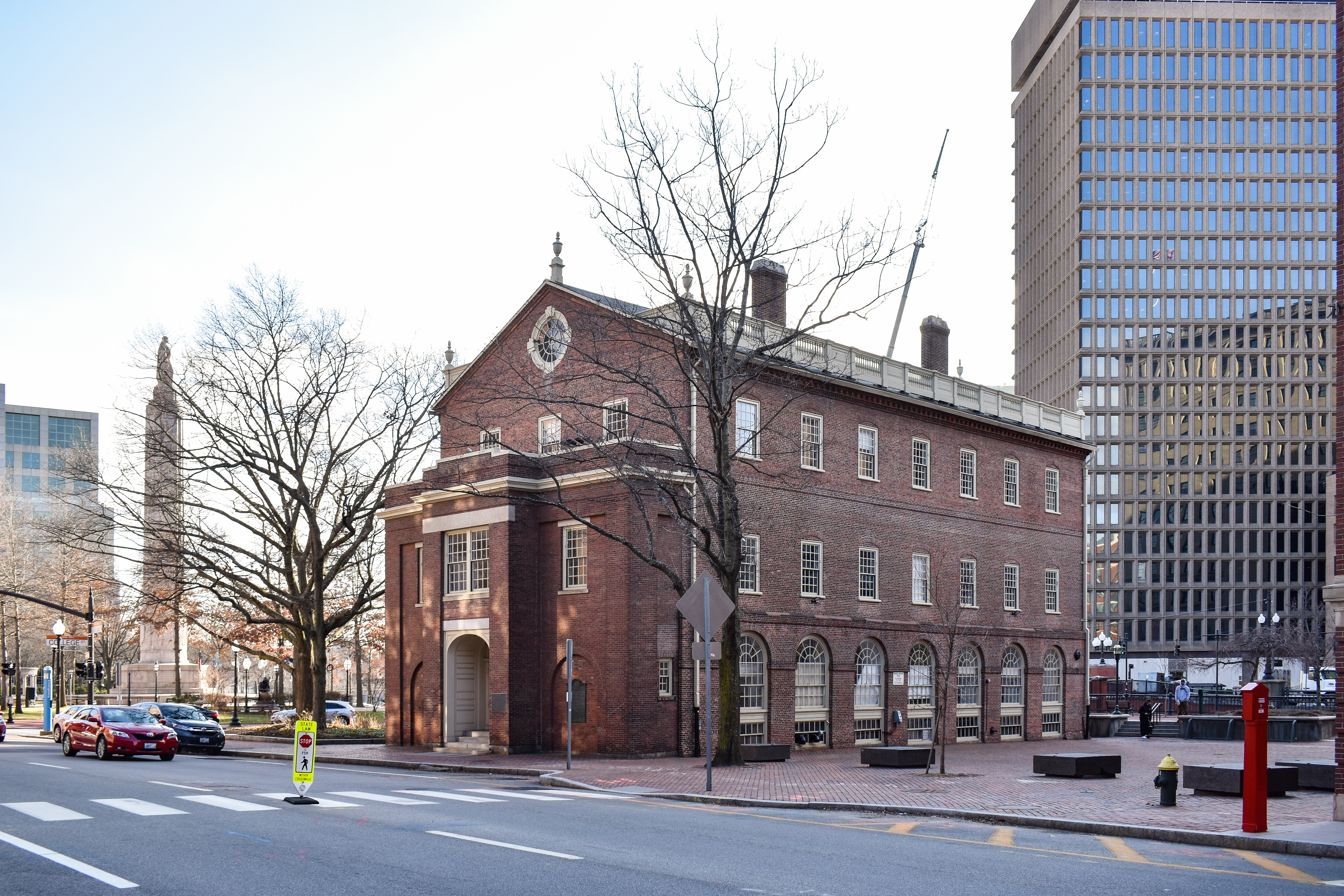
Market Square was the center of civic life in the 19th century, and Market House was home to the city council before Providence City Hall was built.

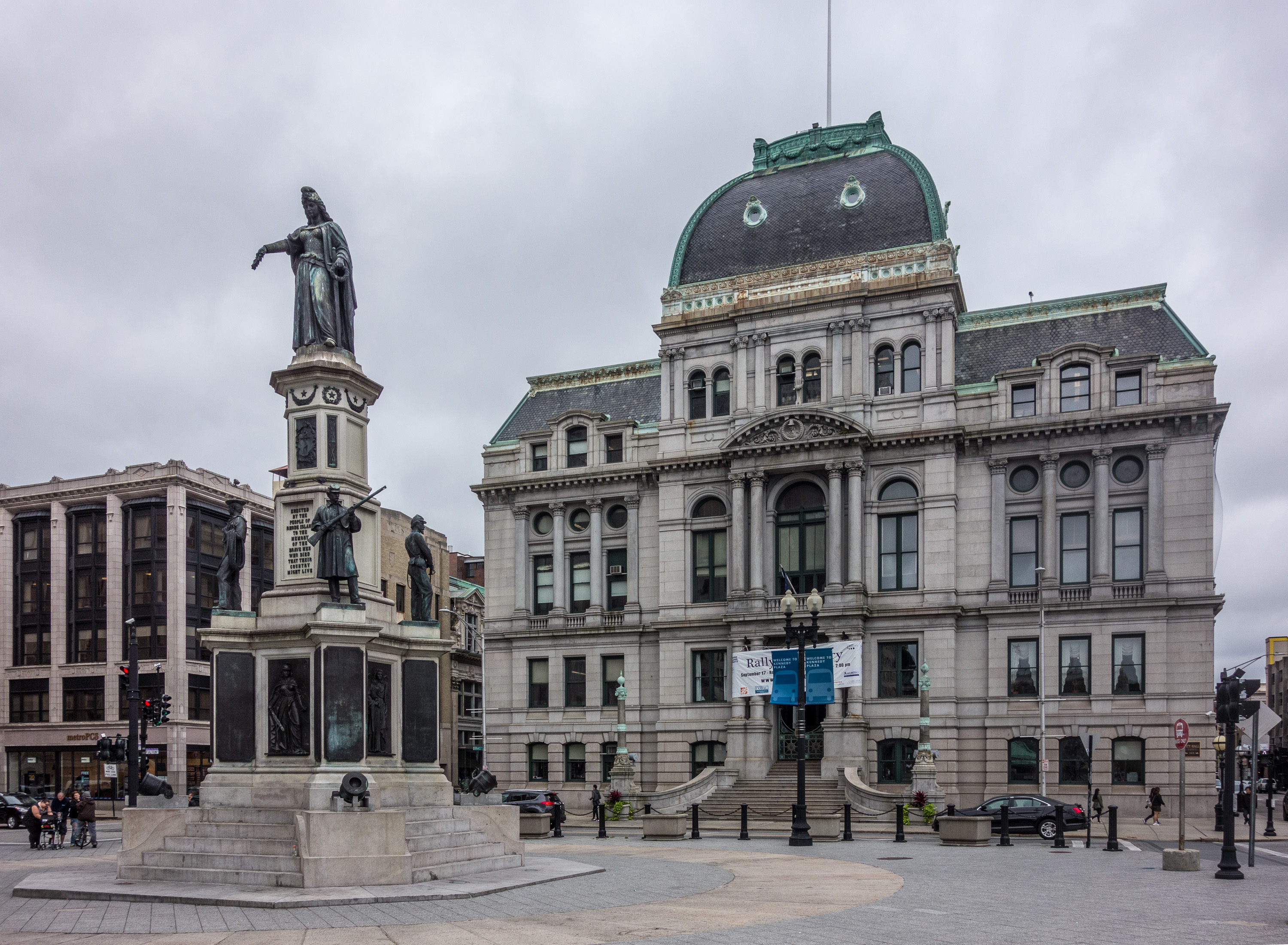
Providence City Hall was built in 1878

Following the war, Providence was the nation's ninth-largest city (Note: Providence was listed as a town (not a city) by the US Census Bureau until the census of 1840 because city status in the New England states is conferred by the form of government, not by population. Providence retained the title of ninth-largest settlement until the census of 1810.) with 7,614 people. The economy shifted from maritime endeavors to manufacturing, in particular machinery, tools, silverware, jewelry, and textiles. By the start of the 20th century, Providence hosted some of the largest manufacturing plants in the country, including Brown & Sharpe, Nicholson File, and Gorham Manufacturing Company. The city's industries attracted many immigrants from Ireland, Germany, Sweden, England, Italy, Portugal, Cape Verde, and French Canada. These economic and demographic shifts caused social strife. Hard Scrabble and Snow Town were the sites of race riots in 1824 and 1831.

Providence residents ratified a city charter in 1831 as the population passed 17,000. The seat of city government was located in the Market House in Market Square from 1832 to 1878, which was the geographic and social center of the city. The city offices soon outgrew this building, and the City Council resolved to create a permanent municipal building in 1845. The city offices moved into Providence City Hall in 1878.

Local politics split over slavery during the American Civil War, as many had ties to Southern cotton and the slave trade. Despite ambivalence concerning the war, the number of military volunteers routinely exceeded quota, and the city's manufacturing proved invaluable to the Union. Providence thrived after the war, and waves of immigrants brought the population from 54,595 in 1865 to 175,597 by 1900.

By the early 1900s, Providence was one of the wealthiest cities in the United States. Immigrant labor powered one of the nation's largest industrial manufacturing centers. Providence was a major manufacturer of industrial products, from steam engines to precision tools to silverware, screws, and textiles. Giant companies were based in or near Providence, such as Brown & Sharpe, the Corliss Steam Engine Company, Babcock & Wilcox, the Grinnell Corporation, the Gorham Manufacturing Company, Nicholson File, and the Fruit of the Loom textile company. The manufacturing of jewelry and costume jewelry emerged as a dominant local industry. In the 1960s, jewelry trade magazines referred to Providence as "the jewelry capital of the world".

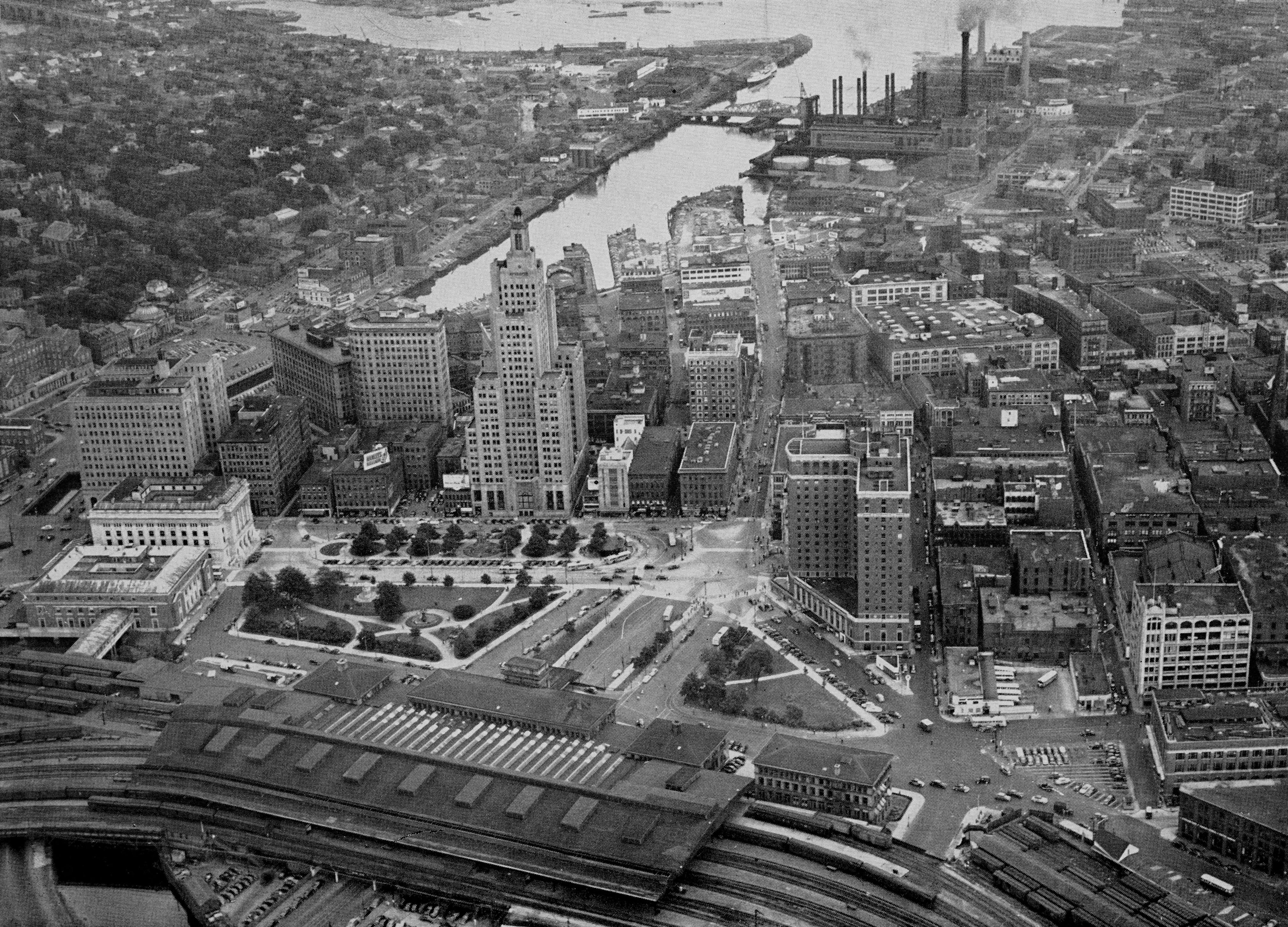
Aerial photograph of Downtown Providence taken in 1951

In 1922, it was affected by the 1922 New England Textile Strike, shutting down the mills in the city over an attempted wage cut and hours increase.

The city began to see a decline by the mid-1920s as manufacturing industries began to shut down. It was deeply affected by the Great Depression, which left more than a third of the city's labor force unemployed. The subsequent Recession of 1937–1938 was immediately followed by the New England Hurricane of 1938, which flooded downtown. The hurricane was particularly destructive to the struggling textile industry, with many mills never reopening following the storm. Providence's population declined from a peak of 253,504 in 1940 to only 179,213 in 1970, as the white middle class moved to the suburbs. From the 1940s to 1970s, white middle class residents vacated Providence faster than any other American city other than Detroit. The remainder of these residents were disproportionately poor and elderly. From the 1950s to the 1980s, Providence was a notorious bastion of organized crime.

From 1975 until 1982, $606 million of local and national community development funds were invested throughout the city. In the 1990s, the city pushed for revitalization, completing a number of major development projects. Among these were the realignment of railroad tracks; the relocation of rivers, creation of Waterplace Park, and development of a riverwalk; the construction of a Downtown ice rink; and the development of Providence Place Mall. In 1980, Providence's previously declining population began to grow once again.

In the early 2000s, Providence developed an economic development plan that outlined a shift to a knowledge-based economy. These efforts involved the rebranding of the formerly industrial Jewelry District as a new "Knowledge District". Despite new investment, approximately 21.5-percent of the city population lives below the poverty line. Recent increases in real estate values have further exacerbated problems for those at marginal income levels, mirroring a statewide housing affordability crisis. From 2004 to 2005, Providence saw the highest rise in median housing price of any city in the United States.

== Geography ==
The Providence city limits enclose a small geographical region with a total area of 20.5 square miles (53 km^{2}); 18.5 square miles (48 km^{2}) of it is land and the remaining 2.1 square miles (5.4 km^{2}) is water (roughly 10%). Providence is located at the head of Narragansett Bay, with the Providence River running into the bay through the center of the city, formed by the confluence of the Moshassuck and Woonasquatucket Rivers. The Waterplace Park amphitheater and riverwalks line the river's banks through Downtown. Providence is one of many cities claimed to be founded on seven hills like Rome.

As with many cities worldwide, the Northeastern megacity has a large population of feral pigeons (Columba livia). Although expecting Providence's population genetics to be continuous with the larger megacity, Carlen & Munshi-South 2020 find Providence and Boston share one population and the rest of the region shares another. This is likely due to the intervening low urbanization zone in eastern Connecticut.

=== Neighborhoods ===
Map of neighborhoods in Providence

Providence has 25 official neighborhoods, though these neighborhoods are often grouped together and referred to collectively:

- The East Side is a region comprising the neighborhoods of Blackstone, Hope (aka Summit), Mount Hope, College Hill, Wayland, and Fox Point.
- The Jewelry District describes the area enclosed by I-95, the old I-195, and the Providence River. The city has made efforts to rename this area the Knowledge District to reflect the area's newly developing life sciences and technology-based economy.
- The North End is formed by the concatenation of the neighborhoods of Charles, Wanskuck, Smith Hill, Elmhurst, and Mount Pleasant.
- The South Side (or South Providence) consists of the neighborhoods of Elmwood, Lower South Providence, Upper South Providence, Washington Park, and the West End.
- West Broadway is an officially recognized neighborhood with its own association. It overlaps with the southern half of Federal Hill and the northern part of the West End.

=== Cityscape ===
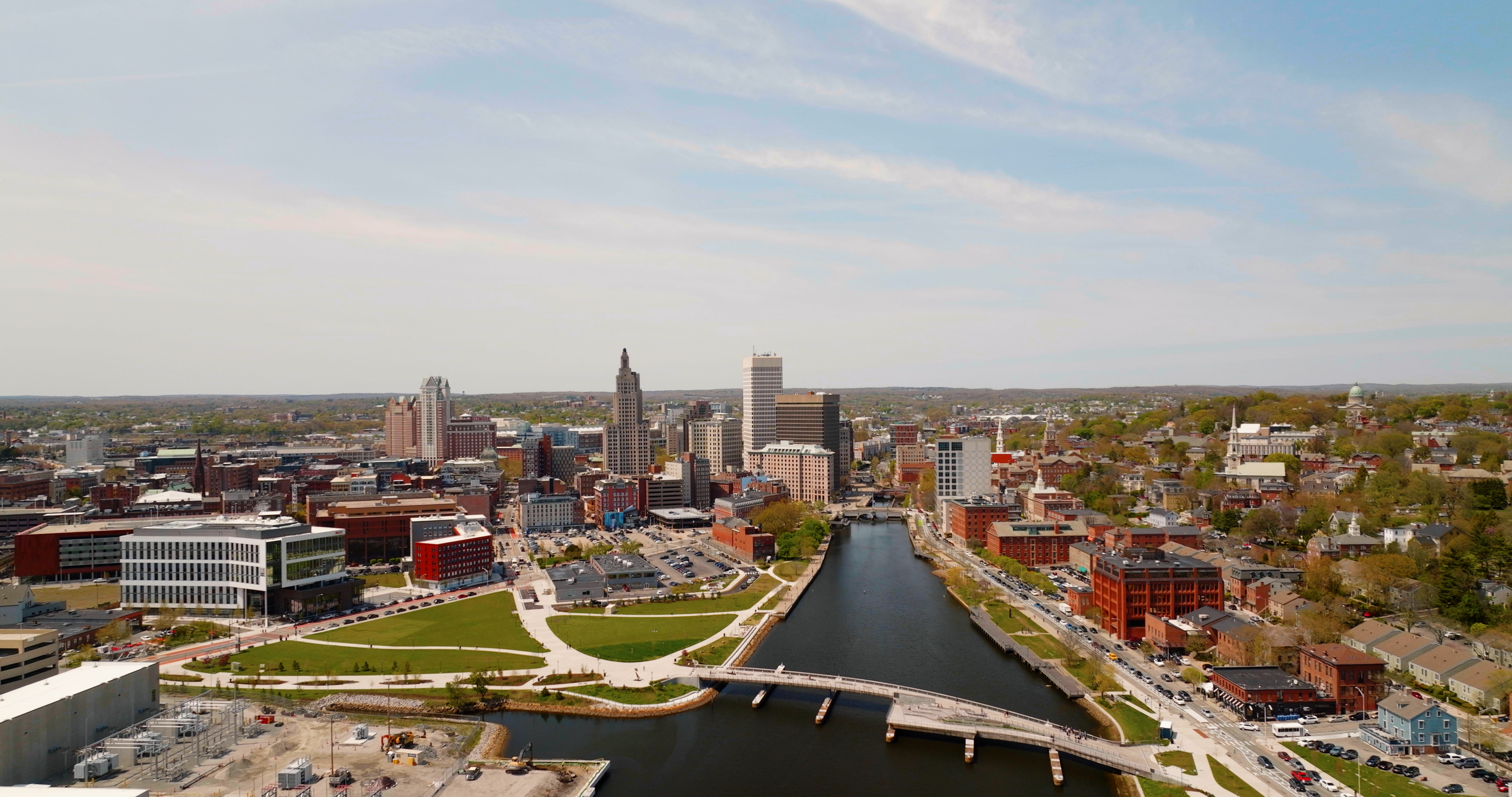
The Providence skyline as viewed from above the Providence River

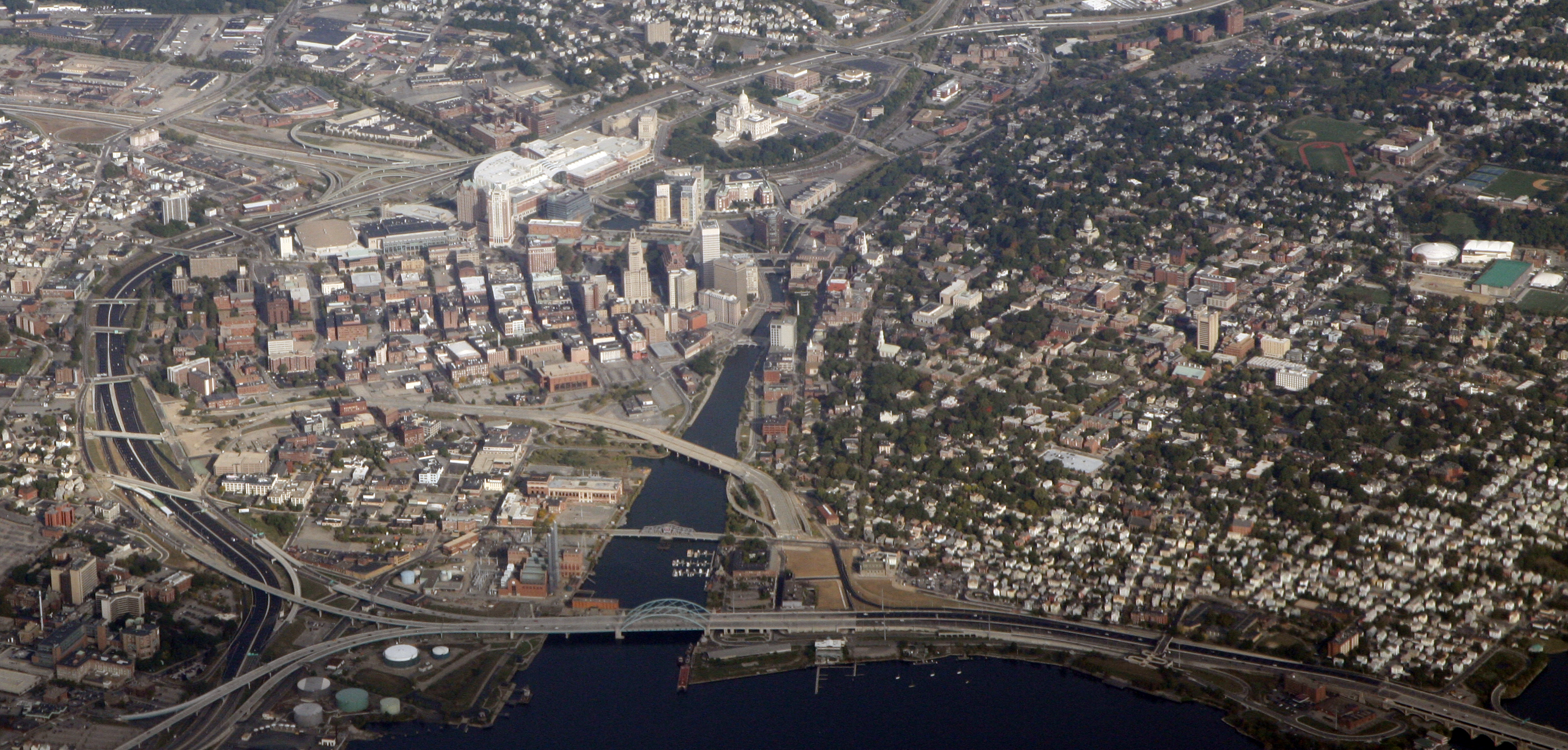
Downtown Providence and the East Side, 2010. Note the demolition of the previous I-195 as part of the Iway project.

Geographically, Providence is compact—characteristic of Eastern Seaboard cities that developed prior to use of the automobile. The street layout of the city is irregular; more than one thousand streets run haphazardly, connecting and radiating from traditionally bustling places such as Market Square.

Downtown Providence has numerous 19th-century mercantile buildings in the Federal and Victorian architectural styles, as well as several postmodern and modernist buildings. In particular, a fairly clear spatial separation appears between the areas of pre-1980s development and post-1980s development; West Exchange Street and Exchange Terrace serve as rough boundaries between the two. The newer area, sometimes called "Capitol Center", includes the Providence Place Mall (1999), Omni Providence Hotel (1993) and Residences Providence (2007), GTECH Corporation (2006), Waterplace Towers condominiums (2007), and Waterplace Park (1994). The area tends toward newer development, since much of it is land reclaimed in the 1970s from a mass of railroad tracks referred to colloquially as the "Chinese Wall". This part of Downtown is characterized by open spaces, wide roads, and landscaping.

The streetscape of much of historic downtown has retained a similar appearance since the early 20th century. Many of the state's tallest buildings are found here. At 426 feet (130 m), the city's largest structure is the art deco Industrial National Bank Building. The building contrasts with the city's second tallest structure—One Financial Plaza—which is designed in the modernist style. Other core buildings of the Providence skyline are the postmodern 50 Kennedy Plaza and late modern Textron Tower. Downtown is also the home of the historic Providence Biltmore hotel and Westminster Arcade—the oldest enclosed shopping mall in the U.S.

The city's southern waterfront, away from the downtown core, is the location of oil tanks, ferry and sailing docks, power plants, and nightclubs. The Russian Submarine Museum was located here until 2008, when the submarine sank. The Fox Point Hurricane Barrier is also found here, built to protect Providence from storm surge like those endured by the city during the 1938 New England Hurricane and Hurricane Carol in 1954.

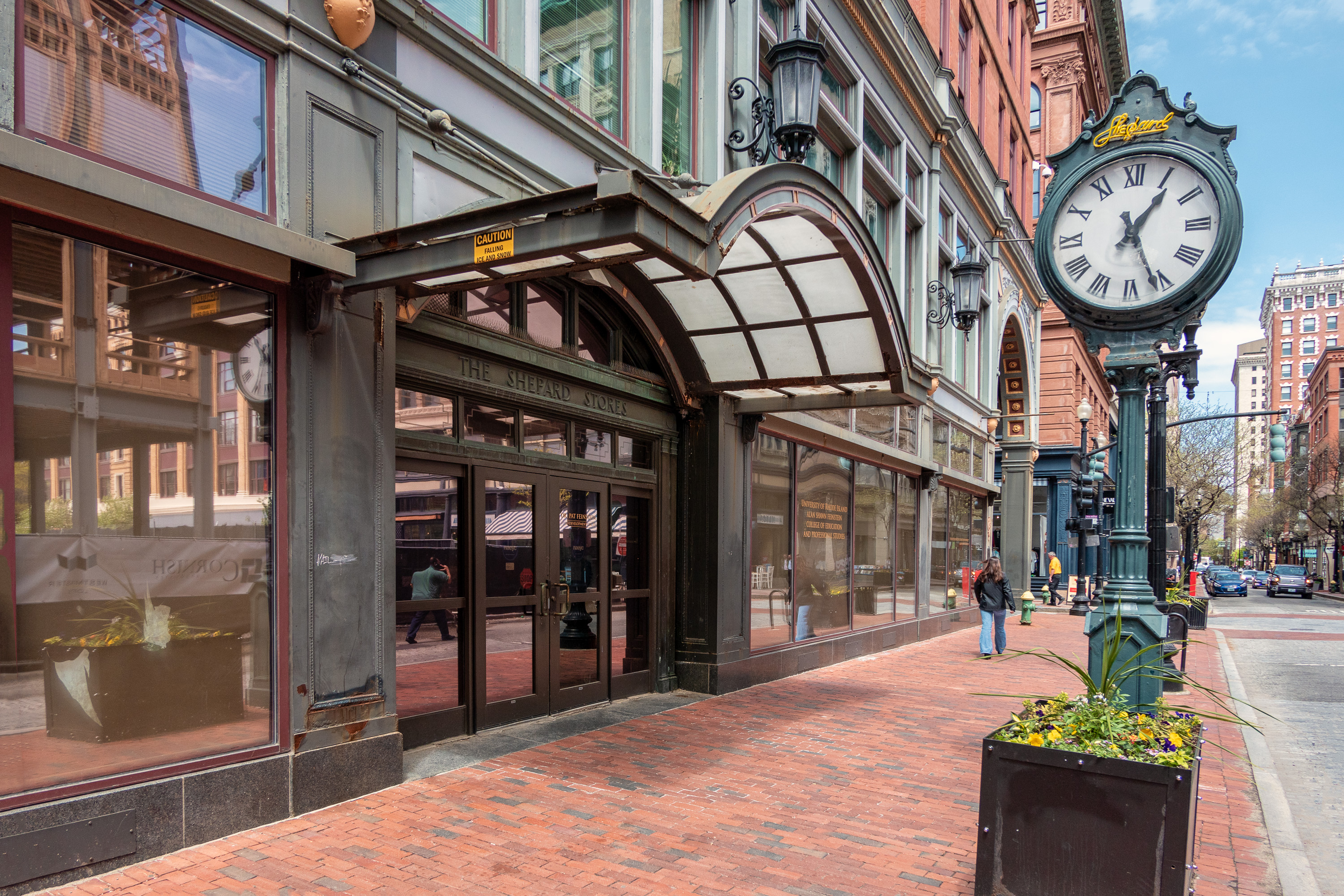
The Shepard Company Building in Downtown Providence's compact urban center

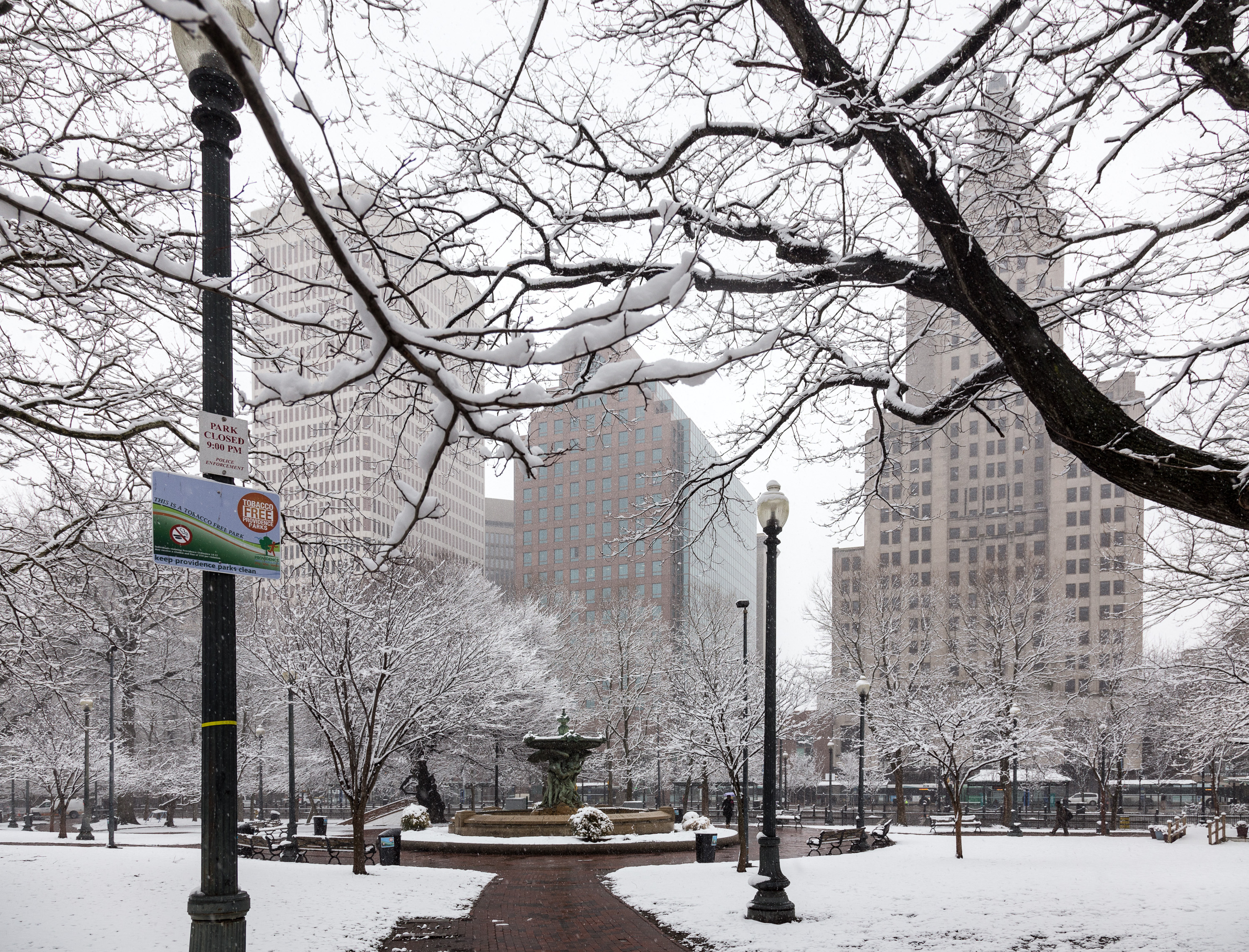
Burnside Park in Downtown Providence facing the city's primary row of high rises

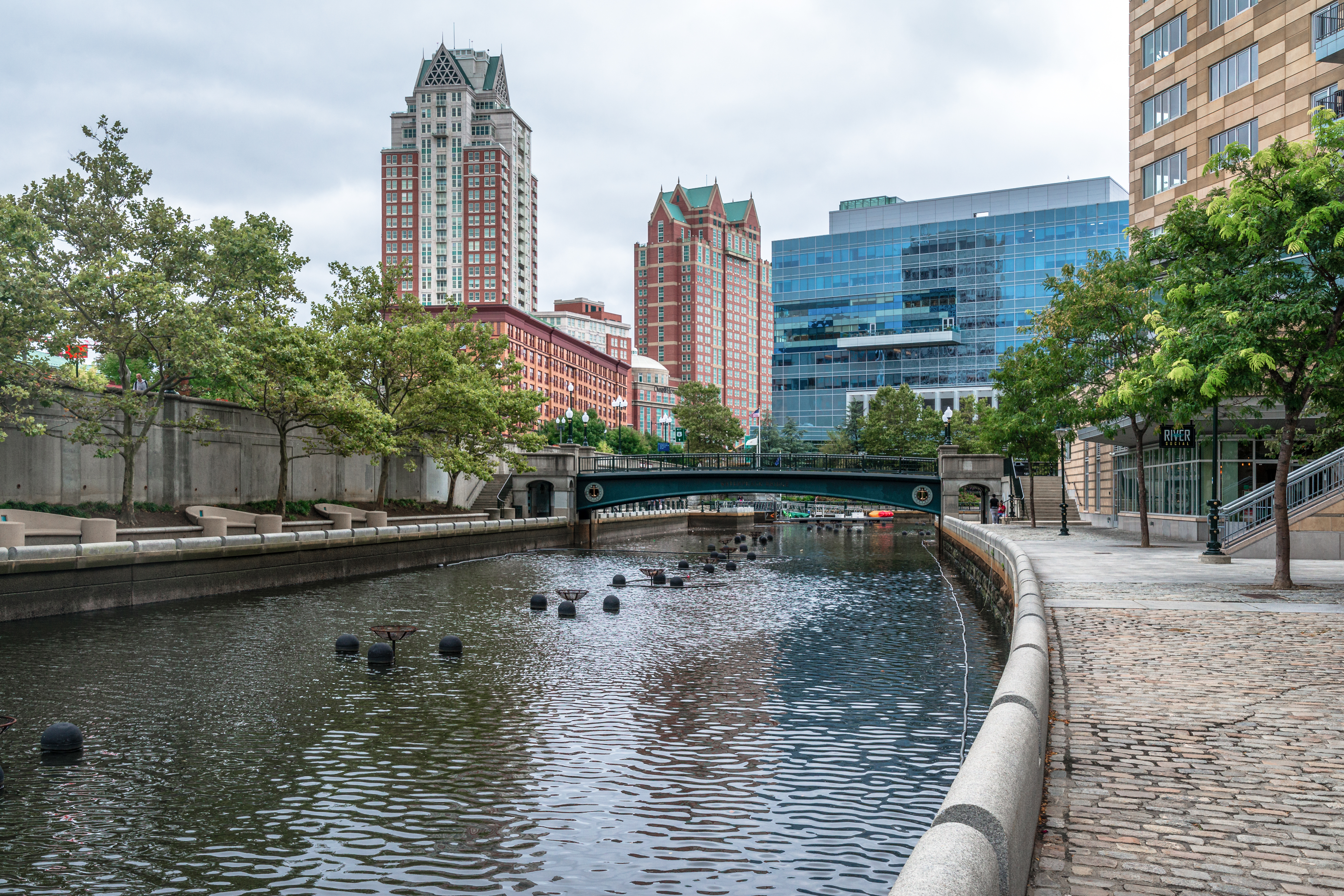
The Providence Riverwalk, at the edge of downtown

=== Climate ===
Providence

Climate chart (precipitation, max. and min. temperature)
J	F	M	A	M	J	J	A	S	O	N	D
3.9 37 21	3.3 40 24	5 48 30	4.4 59 41	3.6 68 49	3.6 78 58	3.3 83 64	3.6 81 63	3.9 74 55	3.9 63 44	4.5 53 36	4.2 42 26
- █ Average max. and min. temperatures in °F
- █ Precipitation totals in inches
Metric conversion
J	F	M	A	M	J	J	A	S	O	N	D
98 3 −6	84 5 −5	127 9 −1	111 15 5	90 20 9	92 25 15	84 28 18	91 27 17	100 23 13	100 17 7	115 12 2	107 6 −3
- █ Average max. and min. temperatures in °C
- █ Precipitation totals in mm

Providence has a humid continental climate (Köppen: Dfa) bordering a humid subtropical climate (Köppen: Cfa) with hot summers, and cool to cold winters. The 2023 USDA places the city in hardiness zone 7a. The influence of the Atlantic Ocean keeps the state of Rhode Island warmer than many inland locales in New England.

July is the warmest month with a daily mean of 73.5 °F (23.1 °C) and highs rising to 90 °F (32 °C) or higher an average of 10 days per summer, January is the coldest month with a daily mean of 29.2 °F (−1.6 °C) and low temperatures dropping to 10 °F (−12 °C) or lower an average of 11 days per winter. Extremes range from −17 °F (−27.2 °C) on February 9, 1934 to 104 °F (40 °C) on August 2, 1975; the record cold daily maximum is 1 °F (−17.2 °C) on February 5, 1918, while the record warm daily minimum is 80 °F (26.7 °C) on both June 6, 1925 and July 3, 2026. Temperature readings of 0 °F (−17.8 °C) or lower are uncommon in Providence and generally occur once every several years. The year which had the most days with a temperature reading of zero degrees or lower was 2015 with eight days total—one day in January and seven days in February. Conversely, temperature readings of 100 °F (37.8 °C) or higher are even rarer, and the year with the most days in this category was 1944 with three days, all of which were in August.

Monthly precipitation in Providence ranges from a high of 4.43 inches (112.5 mm) in March to a low of 3.17 inches (80.5 mm) in July. In general, precipitation levels are slightly less in the summer months than the winter months, when nor'easters can cause significant rain and snowfall on occasion. Hurricanes have impacted Providence, and Providence's location at the head of Narragansett Bay makes it vulnerable to storm surges. Hurricane Carol in 1954 and the 1938 Hurricane were particularly damaging.

Climate data for Providence, Rhode Island (T. F. Green Airport), 1991–2020 normals, (Note: Mean monthly maxima and minima (i.e. the expected highest and lowest temperature readings at any point during the year or given month) calculated based on data at said location from 1991 to 2020.) extremes 1904–present (Note: Official records for Providence kept at downtown from November 1904 to May 1932 and at T. F. Green Airport since June 1932.)
Month	Jan	Feb	Mar	Apr	May	Jun	Jul	Aug	Sep	Oct	Nov	Dec	Year
Record high °F (°C)	70 (21)	72 (22)	90 (32)	98 (37)	96 (36)	100 (38)	102 (39)	104 (40)	100 (38)	88 (31)	81 (27)	77 (25)	104 (40)
Mean maximum °F (°C)	58.7 (14.8)	57.9 (14.4)	67.1 (19.5)	79.3 (26.3)	87.2 (30.7)	91.5 (33.1)	94.8 (34.9)	92.7 (33.7)	87.6 (30.9)	78.9 (26.1)	70.1 (21.2)	61.5 (16.4)	96.6 (35.9)
Mean daily maximum °F (°C)	38.3 (3.5)	40.5 (4.7)	47.7 (8.7)	58.9 (14.9)	68.9 (20.5)	77.7 (25.4)	83.6 (28.7)	82.2 (27.9)	74.8 (23.8)	63.8 (17.7)	53.2 (11.8)	43.4 (6.3)	61.1 (16.2)
Daily mean °F (°C)	30.2 (−1.0)	32.0 (0.0)	38.9 (3.8)	49.3 (9.6)	59.1 (15.1)	68.2 (20.1)	74.4 (23.6)	73.0 (22.8)	65.6 (18.7)	54.4 (12.4)	44.5 (6.9)	35.5 (1.9)	52.1 (11.2)
Mean daily minimum °F (°C)	22.1 (−5.5)	23.5 (−4.7)	30.2 (−1.0)	39.6 (4.2)	49.2 (9.6)	58.8 (14.9)	65.2 (18.4)	63.9 (17.7)	56.5 (13.6)	45.1 (7.3)	35.8 (2.1)	27.6 (−2.4)	43.1 (6.2)
Mean minimum °F (°C)	4.1 (−15.5)	7.4 (−13.7)	15.1 (−9.4)	28.5 (−1.9)	38.1 (3.4)	47.2 (8.4)	56.2 (13.4)	54.3 (12.4)	43.1 (6.2)	31.7 (−0.2)	21.8 (−5.7)	12.3 (−10.9)	2.0 (−16.7)
Record low °F (°C)	−13 (−25)	−17 (−27)	1 (−17)	11 (−12)	29 (−2)	39 (4)	48 (9)	40 (4)	32 (0)	20 (−7)	6 (−14)	−12 (−24)	−17 (−27)
Average precipitation inches (mm)	3.96 (101)	3.44 (87)	4.90 (124)	4.29 (109)	3.37 (86)	3.81 (97)	2.91 (74)	3.59 (91)	4.17 (106)	4.18 (106)	4.27 (108)	4.65 (118)	47.54 (1,208)
Average snowfall inches (cm)	10.3 (26)	10.5 (27)	6.4 (16)	0.6 (1.5)	0.0 (0.0)	0.0 (0.0)	0.0 (0.0)	0.0 (0.0)	0.0 (0.0)	0.2 (0.51)	1.0 (2.5)	7.6 (19)	36.6 (93)
Average precipitation days (≥ 0.01 in)	11.2	10.3	11.6	11.7	12.2	10.8	9.3	9.1	9.1	10.2	9.6	11.9	127.0
Average snowy days (≥ 0.1 in)	5.7	5.4	3.7	0.4	0.0	0.0	0.0	0.0	0.0	0.1	0.6	3.4	19.3
Average relative humidity (%)	63.9	63.0	62.9	61.4	66.6	70.1	71.0	72.5	73.0	70.2	68.9	67.0	67.5
Average dew point °F (°C)	16.3 (−8.7)	17.4 (−8.1)	25.0 (−3.9)	33.1 (0.6)	45.0 (7.2)	55.6 (13.1)	61.5 (16.4)	61.0 (16.1)	53.8 (12.1)	42.6 (5.9)	33.3 (0.7)	22.1 (−5.5)	38.9 (3.8)
Mean monthly sunshine hours	171.7	172.6	215.6	225.1	254.9	274.1	290.6	262.8	233.0	208.7	148.0	148.6	2,605.7
Percentage possible sunshine	58	58	58	56	57	60	63	61	62	61	50	52	58
Average ultraviolet index	1	2	4	6	7	8	8	8	6	4	2	1	5
Source 1: NOAA (relative humidity, dew point, and sun 1961–1990)
Source 2: Weather Atlas

Climate data for Providence
Month	Jan	Feb	Mar	Apr	May	Jun	Jul	Aug	Sep	Oct	Nov	Dec	Year
Average sea temperature °F (°C)	41.4 (5.2)	38.1 (3.4)	38.7 (3.8)	44.1 (6.7)	50.9 (10.5)	59.6 (15.3)	67.0 (19.4)	69.3 (20.7)	66.7 (19.3)	61.6 (16.4)	54.2 (12.3)	47.7 (8.8)	53.3 (11.8)
Source: Weather Atlas

See or edit raw graph data.

== Demographics ==
Historical population
Year	Pop.	±%
1708	1,446	—
1730	3,916	+170.8%
1748	3,452	−11.8%
1755	3,159	−8.5%
1774	4,321	+36.8%
1782	4,310	−0.3%
1790	6,380	+48.0%
1800	7,614	+19.3%
1810	10,070	+32.3%
1820	11,767	+16.9%
1830	16,833	+43.1%
1840	23,171	+37.7%
1850	41,513	+79.2%
1860	50,666	+22.0%
1870	68,904	+36.0%
1880	104,857	+52.2%
1890	132,146	+26.0%
1900	175,597	+32.9%
1910	224,326	+27.8%
1920	237,595	+5.9%
1930	252,981	+6.5%
1940	253,504	+0.2%
1950	248,674	−1.9%
1960	207,498	−16.6%
1970	179,213	−13.6%
1980	156,804	−12.5%
1990	160,728	+2.5%
2000	173,618	+8.0%
2010	178,042	+2.5%
2020	190,934	+7.2%
2024	194,706	+2.0%
Source: Largest Cities and Other Urban Places in the United States 1790 to 1990; 2024 Estimate; 1708 to 1782

The city's population peaked in the 1940s, just prior to the nationwide period of rapid suburbanization. The Providence metropolitan area includes Providence, Fall River, and Warwick, and is estimated to have a population of 1,622,520. In 2006, this area was officially added to the Boston Combined Statistical Area (CSA), the sixth-largest CSA in the country. In recent years, Providence has experienced a sizable growth in its under-18 population.

=== Racial and ethnic composition ===
Historical racial and ethnic profile	2020	2010	1990	1970	1950
White	53.1%	49.8%	69.9%	90.0%	96.5%
—Non-Hispanic Whites	33.8%	37.6%	64.5%	89.5% (Note: From 15% sample)	N/A
Black or African American	16.1%	16.0%	14.8%	8.9%	3.3%
Hispanic or Latino (of any race)	43.5%	38.1%	15.5%	0.8%	N/A
Asian	5.6%	6.4%	5.9%	0.5%	0.1%

=== 2020 census ===
As of the 2020 census, Providence had a population of 190,934. The median age was 30.9 years. 21.5% of residents were under the age of 18 and 11.0% of residents were 65 years of age or older. For every 100 females there were 94.7 males, and for every 100 females age 18 and over there were 92.3 males age 18 and over.

100.0% of residents lived in urban areas, while 0.0% lived in rural areas.

There were 69,597 households in Providence, of which 30.5% had children under the age of 18 living in them. Of all households, 29.6% were married-couple households, 24.7% were households with a male householder and no spouse or partner present, and 36.9% were households with a female householder and no spouse or partner present. About 32.9% of all households were made up of individuals and 10.0% had someone living alone who was 65 years of age or older.

There were 75,257 housing units, of which 7.5% were vacant. The homeowner vacancy rate was 1.3% and the rental vacancy rate was 5.2%.

Racial composition as of the 2020 census
Race	Number	Percent
White	72,001	37.7%
Black or African American	25,860	13.5%
American Indian and Alaska Native	2,931	1.5%
Asian	11,559	6.1%
Native Hawaiian and Other Pacific Islander	149	0.1%
Some other race	51,383	26.9%
Two or more races	27,051	14.2%
Hispanic or Latino (of any race)	83,815	43.9%

Providence has a racially and ethnically diverse population. In 2020, white Americans formed 53.1% of the population, including a sizable white Hispanic community. Non-Hispanic whites were 33.8% of the total population, down from 89.5% in 1970. Providence has had a substantial Italian American population since the start of the 20th century, with 14% of the population claiming Italian ancestry. Italian influence manifests itself in Providence's 'Little Italy' in Federal Hill. Irish immigrants have also had considerable influence on the city's history, with 8% of residents claiming Irish heritage. The percentages of people claiming Irish and Italian ancestry, though high, has gone down considerably from historical highs, and is much lower than the percentages of these groups in Rhode Island as a whole. The city also has a sizable Jewish community, estimated at 10,500 in 2012, or roughly 5% of the city's population.

In 2020, people of Hispanic or Latino origin composed 43.5% of the city's population. They formed a majority of city public school students as of 2007. The majority of Hispanics in Providence are of Dominican descent. Numbering roughly 25,000 and constituting roughly half of the city's Hispanic population, Providence's Dominican community is the fifth largest in the United States. Other Hispanic groups present in sizable numbers include Puerto Ricans, Guatemalans, and Colombians. Hispanics are widespread in significant numbers in most of Providence, but most concentrated in the neighborhoods of Elmwood, the West End, and Upper and Lower South Providence.

African Americans constitute 16.1% of the city's population, with their greatest concentrations found in Mount Hope and the Upper and Lower South Providence neighborhoods. Providence has small Liberian and Haitian communities in the city. Liberians compose 0.4% of the population; the city is home to one of the largest Liberian immigrant populations in the country.

Asian-Americans constitute 5.6% of Providence's population. The largest Asian groups are Cambodians (1.7%), Chinese (1.1%), Indian Americans (0.7%), Laotians (0.6%), and Koreans (0.6%). Another 6% of the city has multiracial ancestry. American Indians and Pacific Islanders make up the remaining 0.9%.

Providence has a considerable community of immigrants from various Portuguese-speaking countries, especially Portugal, Brazil, and Cape Verde. These residents are concentrated in the Washington Park and Fox Point neighborhoods. Portuguese is the city's third-largest European ethnicity, after Italian and Irish. Cape Verdeans compose 2% of the city's population. The most reported ancestries in 2020 were:

- Dominican (18.2%)
- Irish (8.3%)
- Guatemalan (8%)
- Puerto Rican (7%)
- Italian (6.8%)
- African American (6%)
- English (5.8%)
- German (4%)
- French (2.5%)
- Portuguese (2.2%)

== Economy ==
Distribution of Providence's economic activity

Over one third of Providence's economy is based in trade, transportation, utilities, and educational and health services. As the capital of Rhode Island, the city's economy additionally consists of government services, with approximately 70,000 jobs. The unemployment rate in the city is 5.0% as of August 2022, compared to a national rate of 3.8%.

Prominent companies headquartered in Providence include Fortune 500 Textron, an advanced technologies industrial conglomerate; United Natural Foods, a distributor of natural and organic foods; Fortune 1000 Nortek Incorporated; Gilbane, a construction and real estate company. Other companies with headquarters in the city include Citizens Bank, Virgin Pulse, Ørsted US Offshore Wind, and Providence Equity. Providence is the site of a sectional center facility (SCF), a regional hub for the U.S. Postal Service. Providence is also home to some of toy manufacturer Hasbro's business operations, although their headquarters are in Pawtucket.

The city is home to the Rhode Island Convention Center, which opened in December 1993. Along with a hotel, the convention center is connected to the Providence Place Mall, a major retail center, through a skywalk.

== Arts and culture ==
Arts and Culture

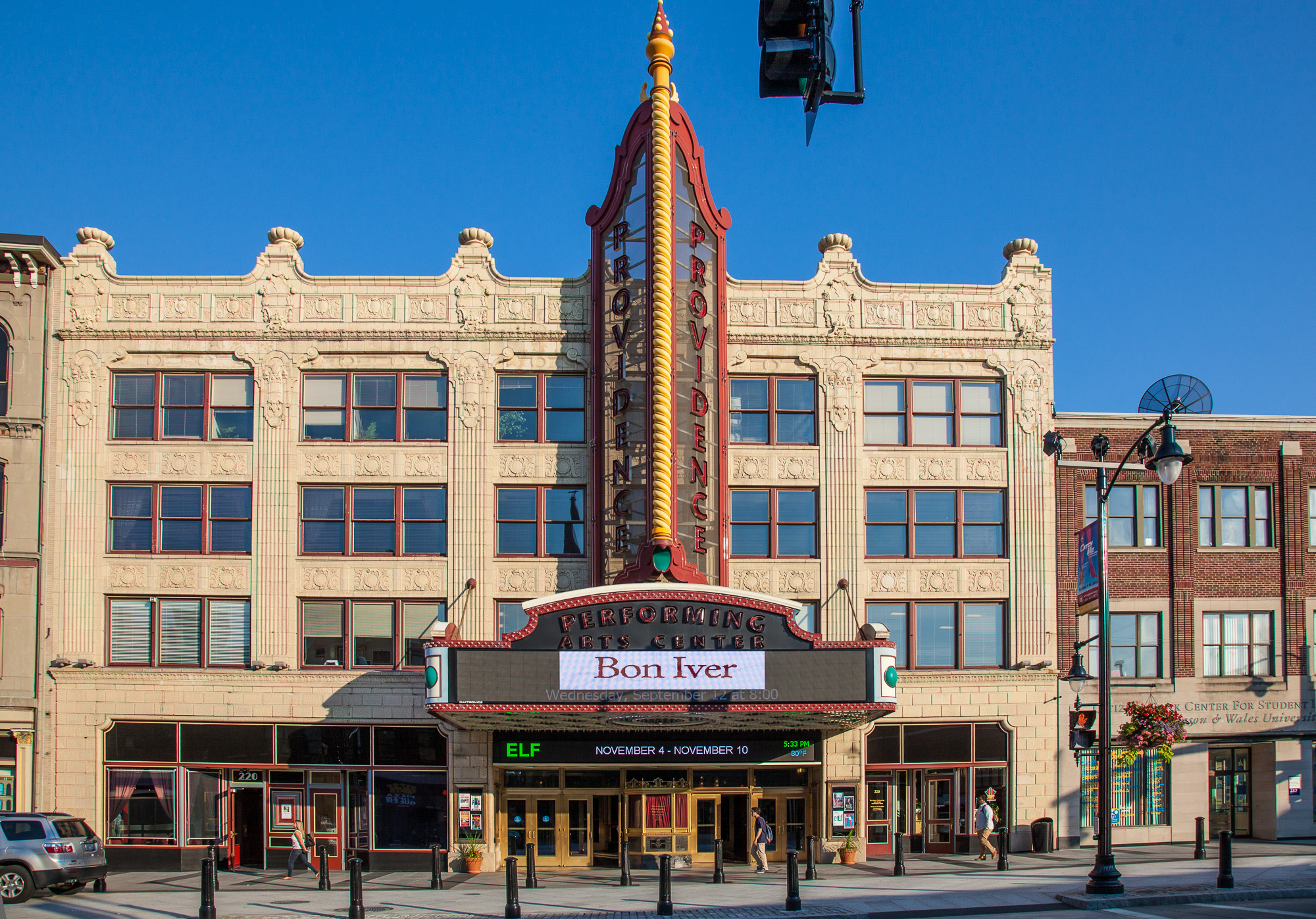
The Providence Performing Arts Center

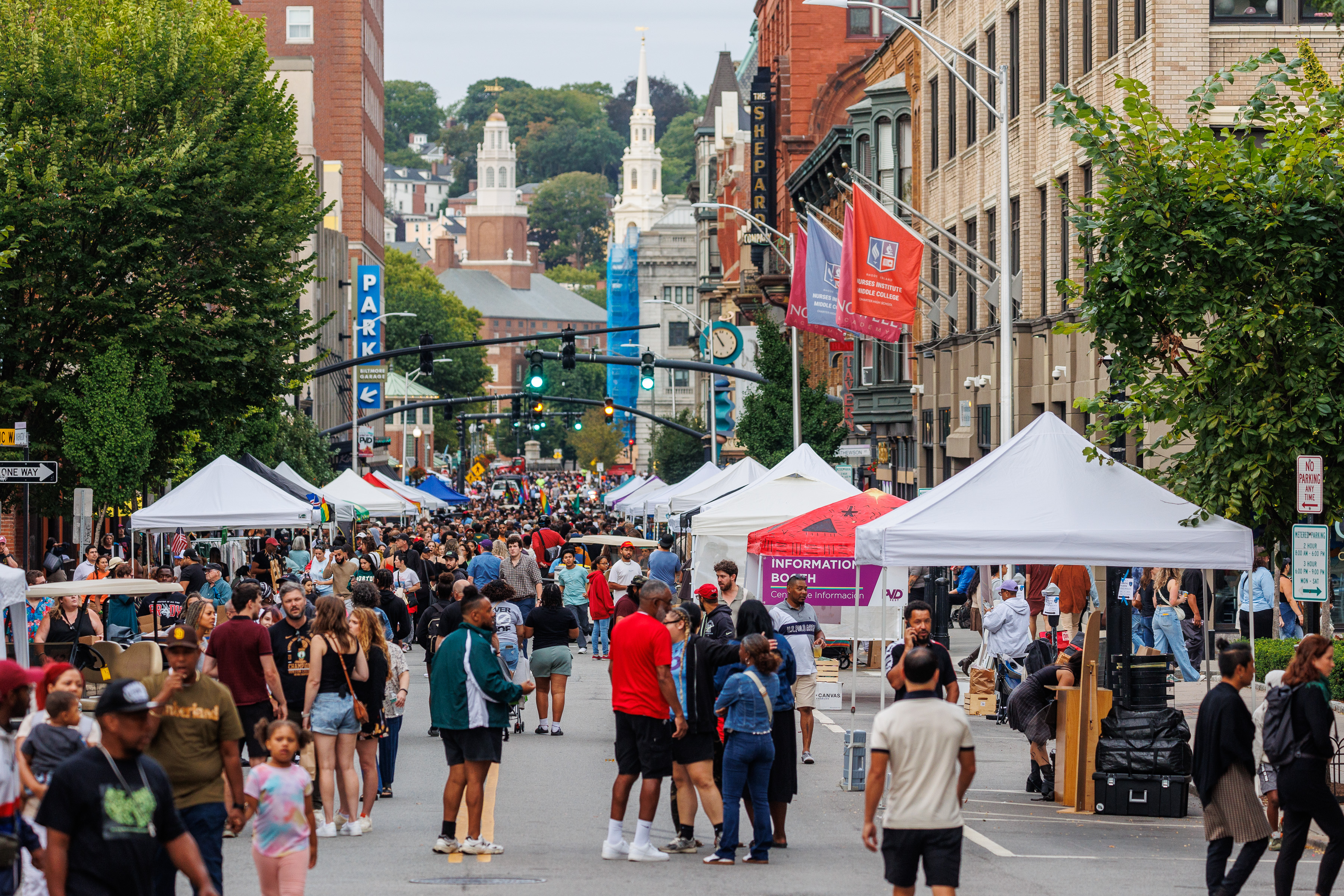
Washington St. in downtown Providence during PVDFest 2024

Much of Providence culture is synonymous with the culture of Rhode Island as a whole. Like the state, the city has a non-rhotic accent that can be heard on local media. Providence also shares Rhode Island's affinity for coffee, with the most coffee and doughnut shops per capita of any city in the country. Providence is also reputed to have the highest number of restaurants per capita of major U.S. cities.

During the summer months, the city regularly hosts WaterFire, an environmental art installation that consists of about 100 bonfires which blaze just above the surface of the three rivers that pass through the middle of Downtown Providence. There are multiple WaterFire events that are accompanied by various pieces of classical and world music.

Providence has several ethnic neighborhoods, notably Federal Hill and the North End (Italian), Fox Point (Portuguese), West End (mainly Central American and Asian), and Smith Hill (Irish). There are also many dedicated community organizations and arts associations located in the city.

The city gained the reputation as one of the most active and growing gay and lesbian communities in the Northeast. The rate of reported gay and lesbian relationships is 75% higher than the national average. Former mayor David Cicilline won his election running as an openly gay man. Former Mayor Buddy Cianci instituted the position of Mayor's Liaison to the Gay and Lesbian community in the 1990s. and Providence is home to the largest gay bathhouse in New England.

The city is the home of the Tony Award-winning theater group Trinity Repertory Company, the Providence Black Repertory Company, and the Rhode Island Philharmonic Orchestra, as well as groups such as The American Band, once associated with noted American composer David Wallis Reeves. Providence hosts several performing arts centers, such as the Veterans Memorial Auditorium, the Providence Performing Arts Center, and Festival Ballet Providence. The city's underground music is centered on artist-run spaces such as the now-defunct Fort Thunder and is known in underground music circles. Providence is also home to the Providence Improv Guild, an improvisational theatre that has weekly performances and offers improv and sketch comedy classes, and AS220, a long-standing non-profit arts center with exhibition, educational, and performance spaces, as well as live-work studios.

A multi-day annual outdoor arts festival, PVDFest, features a mix of live music performances, art installations, craft markets, and food vendors showcasing global cuisines.

=== Sites of interest ===
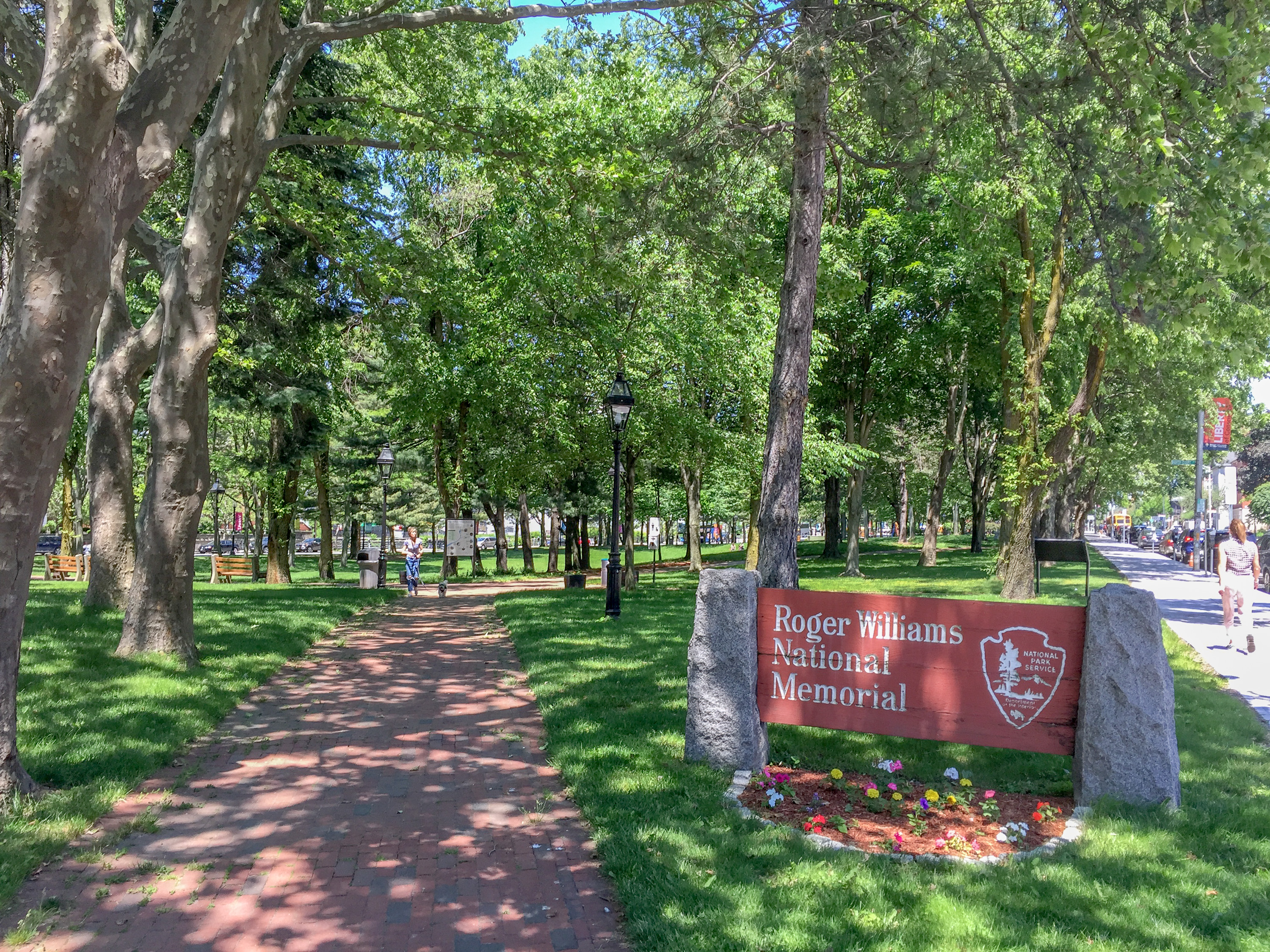
Roger Williams National Memorial

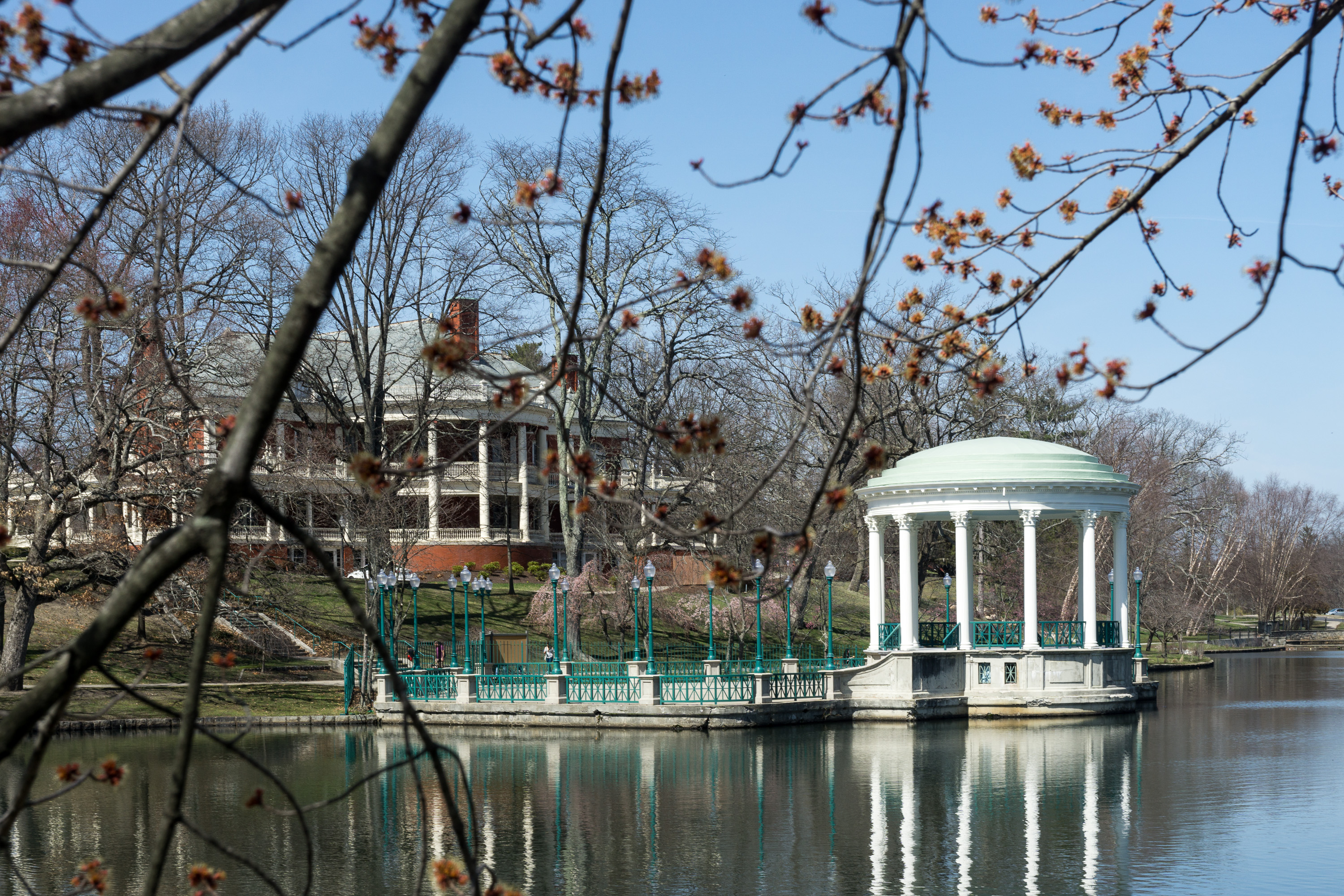
Roger Williams Park

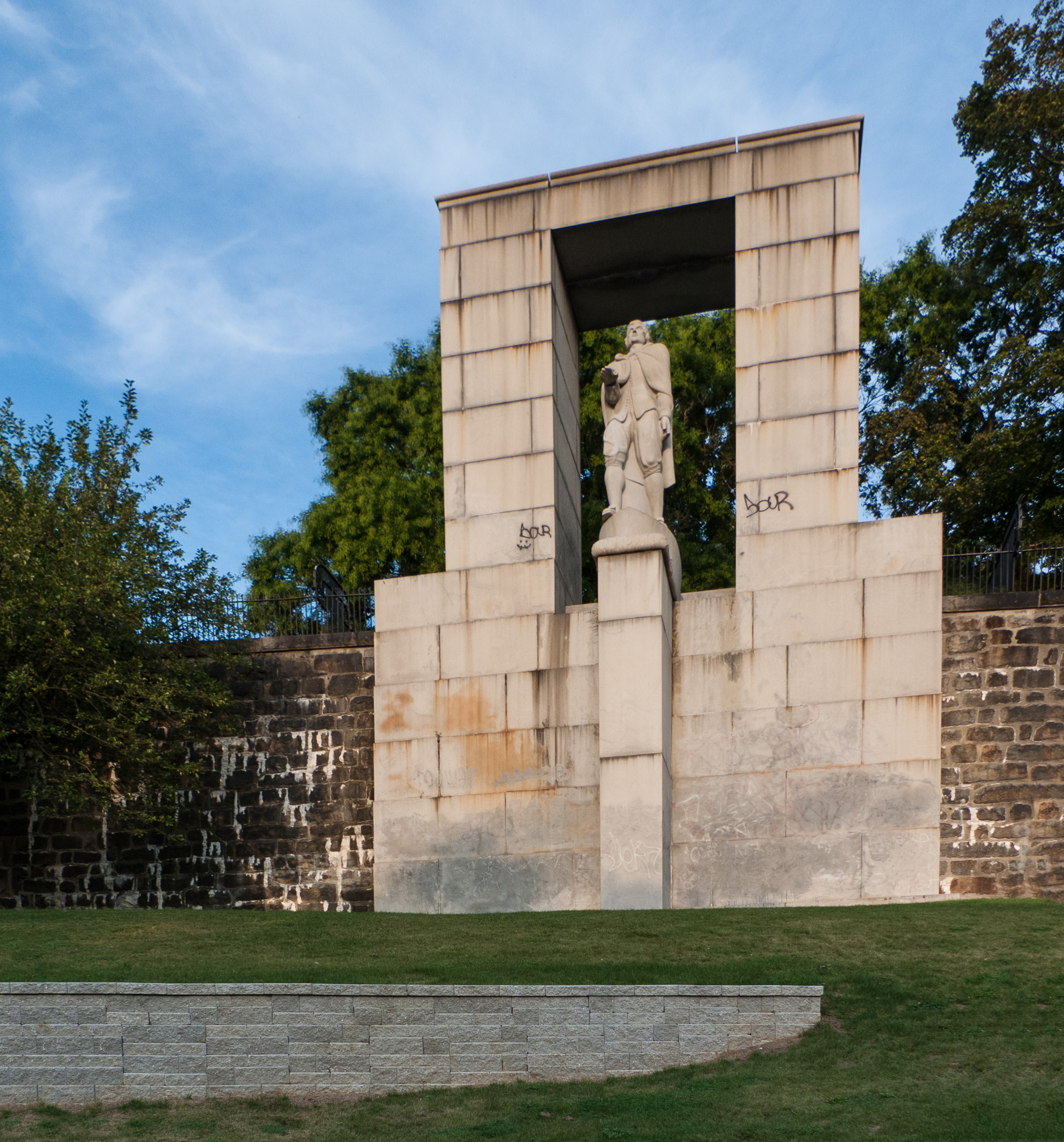
Prospect Terrace Park

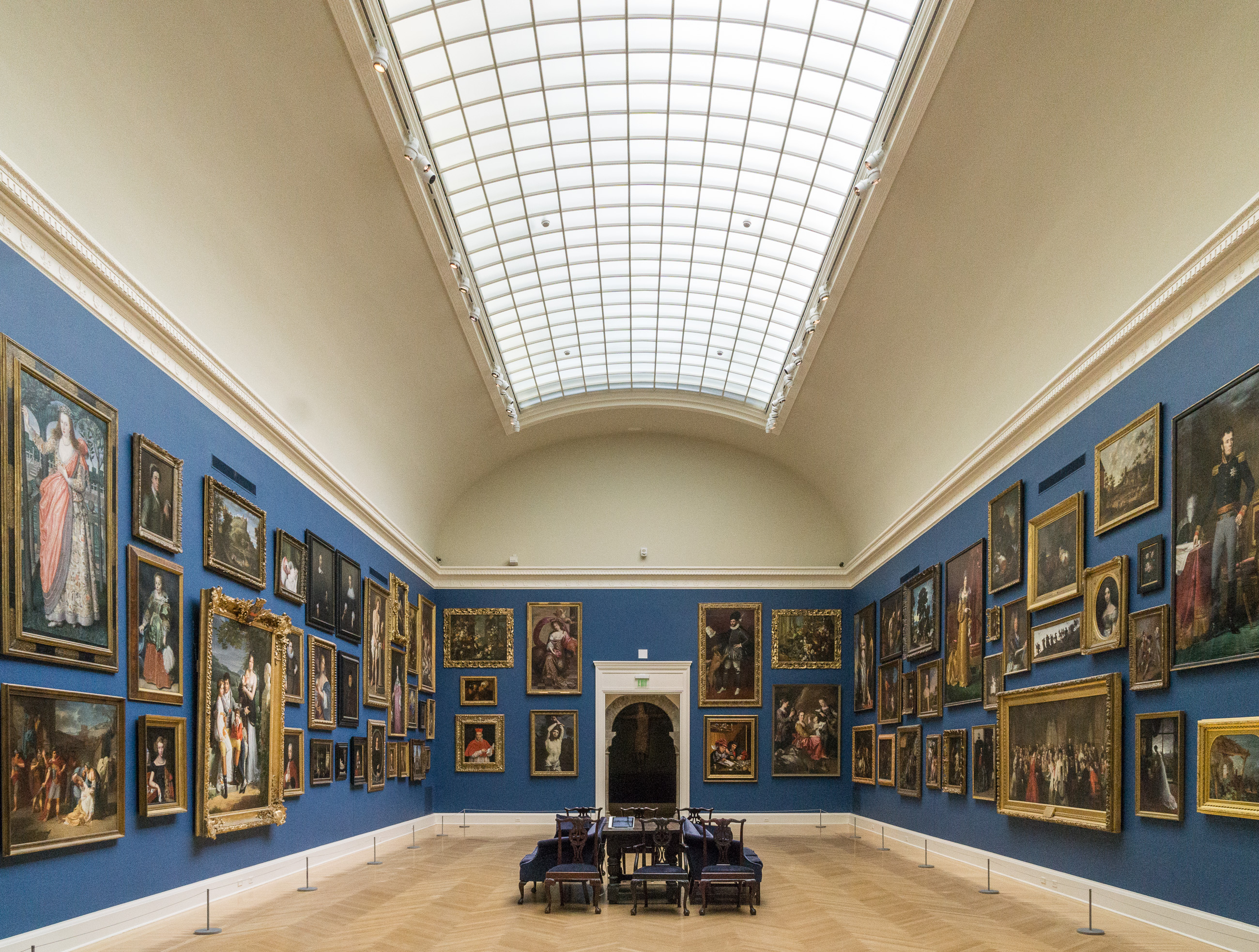
Rhode Island School of Design Museum

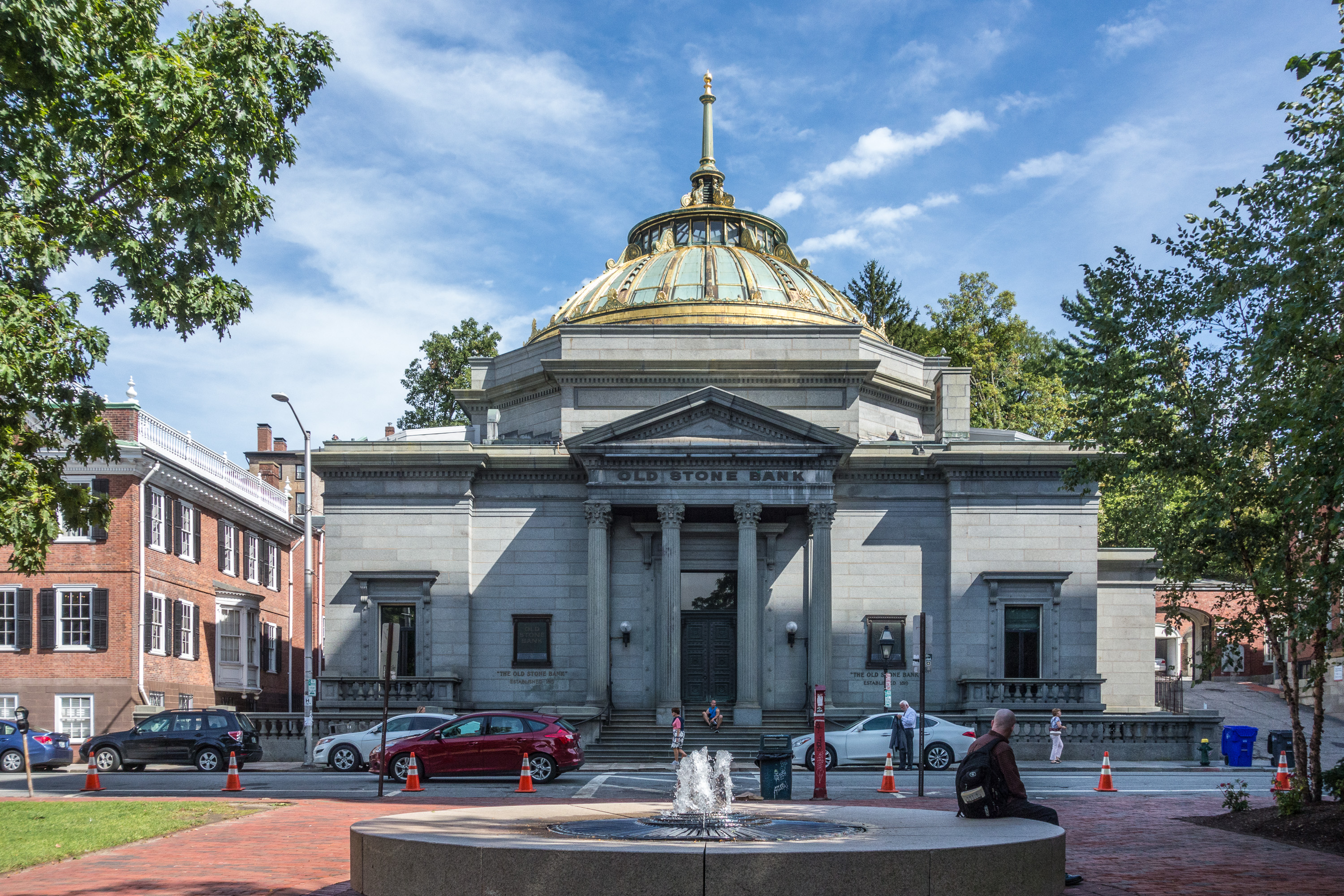
Old Stone Bank

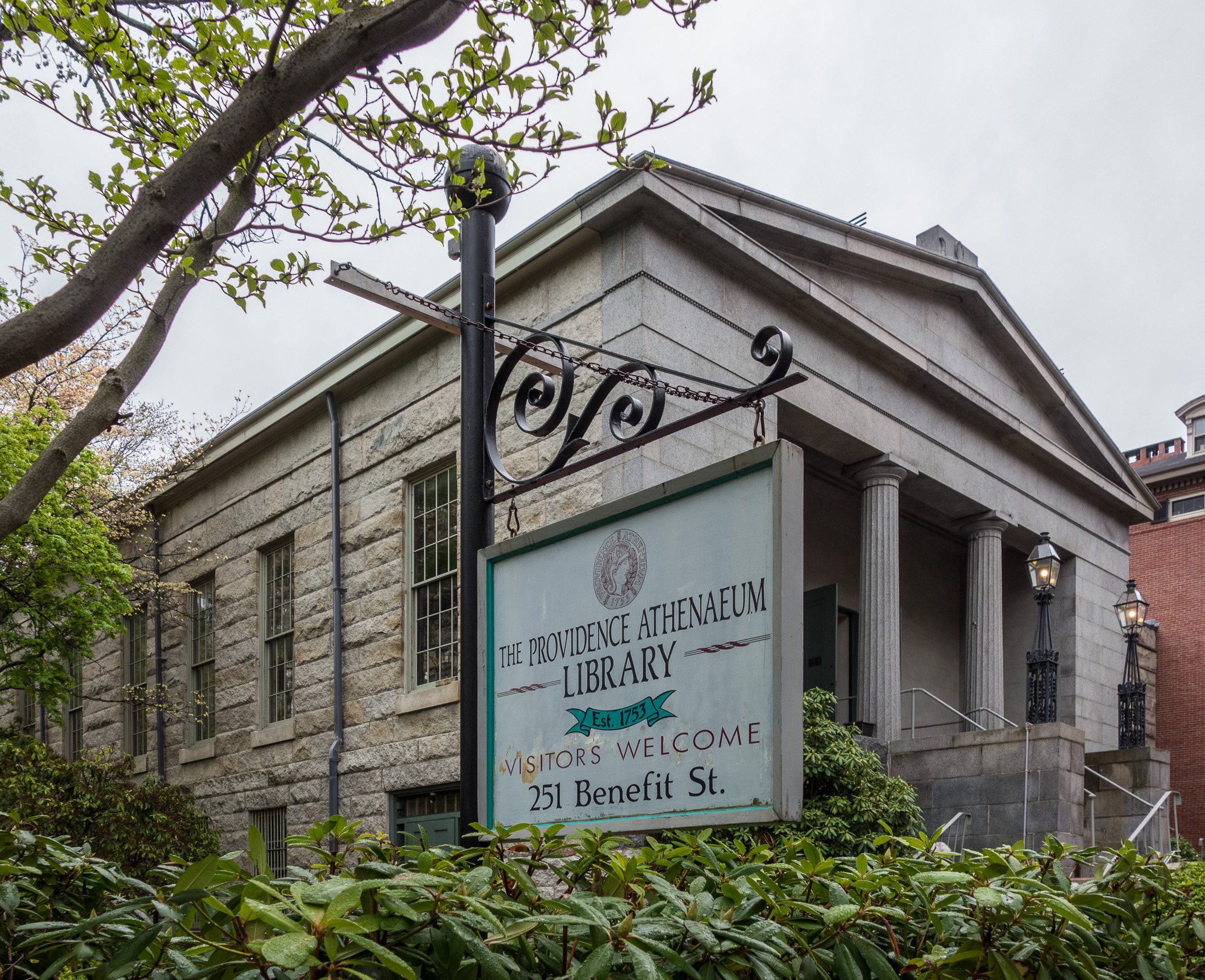
Providence Athenæum

Providence is home to a 1,200-acre (4.9 km^{2}) park system. Notable among these are Waterplace Park and the Riverwalk, Roger Williams Park, Roger Williams National Memorial, and Prospect Terrace Park. Prospect Terrace Park features expansive views of the downtown area, as well as a 15-foot tall granite statue of Roger Williams gazing over the city. As one of the first cities in America, Providence contains many historic buildings, while the East Side neighborhood in particular includes the largest contiguous area of buildings listed on the National Register of Historic Places in the U.S., with many pre-revolutionary houses.

Providence's East Side is home to the First Baptist Church in America, which was founded by Williams in 1638, as well as the Old State House which served as the state's capitol from 1762 to 1904. Nearby is Roger Williams National Memorial. The dome of the State House is the fourth-largest self-supporting marble dome in the world and the second-largest marble dome after St. Peter's Basilica in Rome. The Westminster Arcade is the oldest enclosed shopping center in the U.S.

The Rhode Island School of Design Museum contains the 20th-largest collection in the United States. The Providence Athenæum is the fourth oldest library in the United States, in addition to the Providence Public Library and the nine branches of the Providence Community Library. Edgar Allan Poe frequented the library, and met and courted Sarah Helen Whitman there. H. P. Lovecraft was also a regular patron.

The Bank Newport City Center is located near Kennedy Plaza in the Downtown district, connected by pedestrian tunnel to Waterplace Park, a cobblestone and concrete park below street traffic that abuts Providence's three rivers. Another downtown landmark is the Providence Biltmore, a historic hotel which stands adjacent to Kennedy Plaza.

The southern part of the city is home to the famous roadside attraction Big Blue Bug, the world's largest termite and mascot of eponymous Big Blue Bug Solutions. Roger Williams Park contains a zoo, a botanical center, and the Museum of Natural History and Planetarium.

== Sports ==
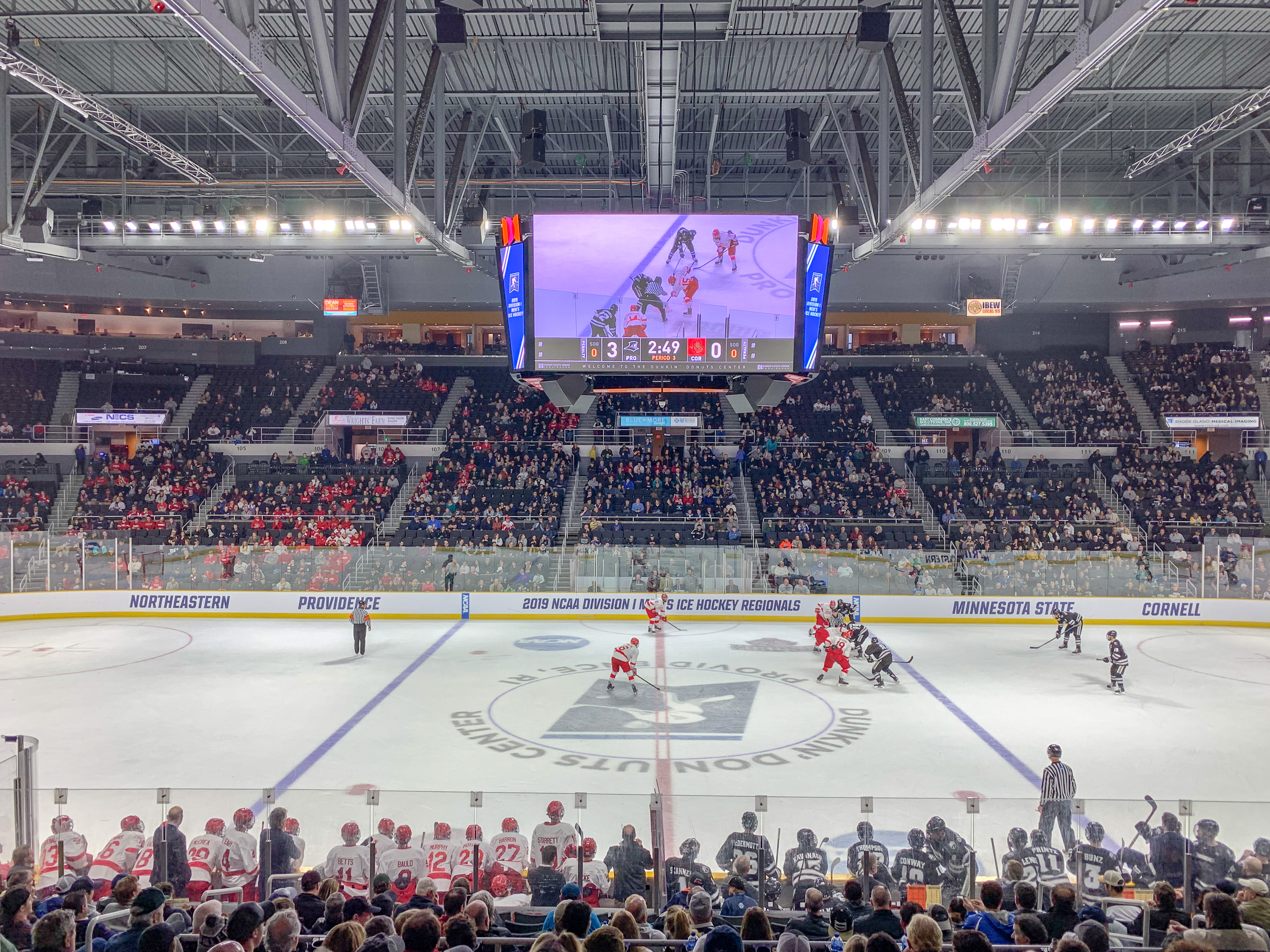
The Amica Mutual Pavilion hosted the NCAA ice hockey East Regionals in 2019

Providence is home to the Providence Bruins of the American Hockey League, who play at the Amica Mutual Pavilion. From 1926 to 1972, the AHL's Providence Reds (renamed the Rhode Island Reds in their last years) played at the Rhode Island Auditorium. In 1972, the team relocated to the Providence Civic Center, where they played until moving to Binghamton, New York, in 1977.

The National Football League's New England Patriots and Major League Soccer's New England Revolution play in Foxborough, Massachusetts, which is situated halfway between Providence and Boston. Providence was formerly home to two major league franchises: the NFL's Providence Steam Roller in the 1920s and 1930s, and the National Basketball Association's Providence Steamrollers in the 1940s. The Rhode Island Auditorium also hosted 29 of the 49 boxing fights of Rocky Marciano.

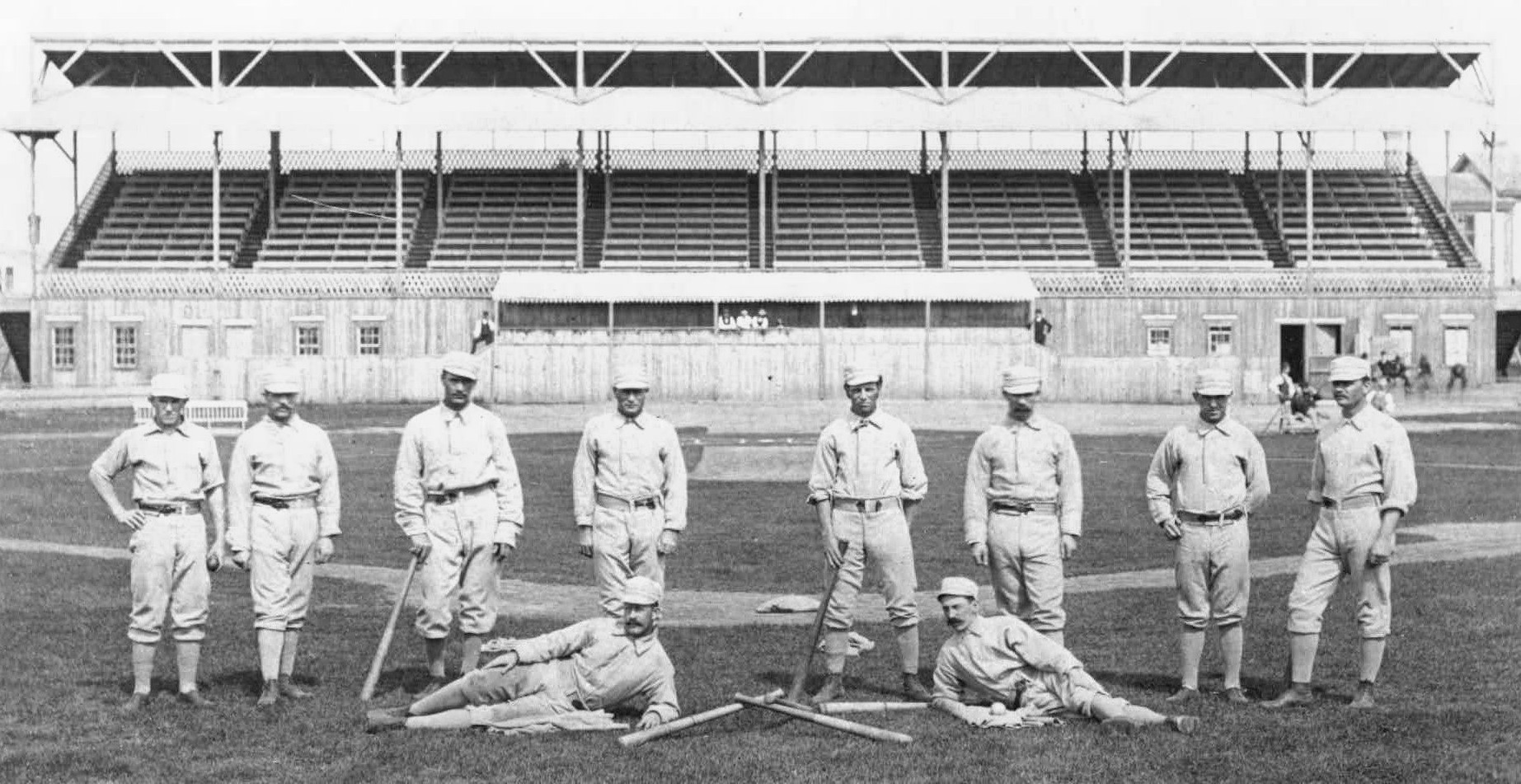
1879 National League champion Providence Grays

The city's defunct baseball team, the Providence Grays, competed in the National League from 1878 through 1885. The team defeated the New York Metropolitans in baseball's first successful "world championship series" in 1884. In 1914, after the Boston Red Sox purchased Babe Ruth from the then-minor league Baltimore Orioles, the team prepared Ruth for the major leagues by sending him to finish the season playing for a minor league team in Providence that was also known as the Grays. Most baseball fans—along with the local media—tend to follow the Boston Red Sox.

Major colleges and universities fielding NCAA Division I athletic teams are Brown University and Providence College. The latter is a member of the Big East Conference. Until 2020, Providence was home to the headquarters of the American Athletic Conference (The American).

Providence has also hosted the alternative sports event Gravity Games from 1999 to 2001, and was also the first host of ESPN's X Games, known in its first edition as the Extreme Games, in 1995. Providence has its own roller derby league. Formed in 2004, it currently has four teams: the Providence Mob Squad, the Sakonnet River Roller Rats, the Old Money Honeys, and the Rhode Island Riveters.

Providence is also home to the Providence Hurling Club. The Providence Hurling Club was founded in 2015 and competes in the Junior C division of the Boston GAA. Despite being the newest hurling team within the Boston GAA, the Providence Hurling Club has captured two Junior C titles- with the first in 2021 with a win over Hartford and the second in 2023 with a win over Worcester. Home games are held at Pleasant View Elementary School in Providence and playoff matches are held at the Irish Cultural Center in Canton, MA.

Major Sports teams
Club	Sport	League	Venue	Established	Folded	Championships
Providence Bruins	Ice hockey	AHL	Amica Mutual Pavilion	1987		1
Providence Reds	Ice hockey	CAHL from 1926 to 1936, AHL from 1936 to 1977	Rhode Island Auditorium (1926–1972), Amica Mutual Pavilion (1972–1977)	1926	1977	4
Providence Steam Roller	American Football	NFL	Kinsley Park from 1916 to 1924, Cycledrome from 1925 to 1931	1916	1931	0
Providence Steamrollers	Basketball	BAA	Rhode Island Auditorium	1946	1949	0
Providence Grays	Baseball	National League/MLB	Messer Street Grounds	1878	1885	0

== Government ==
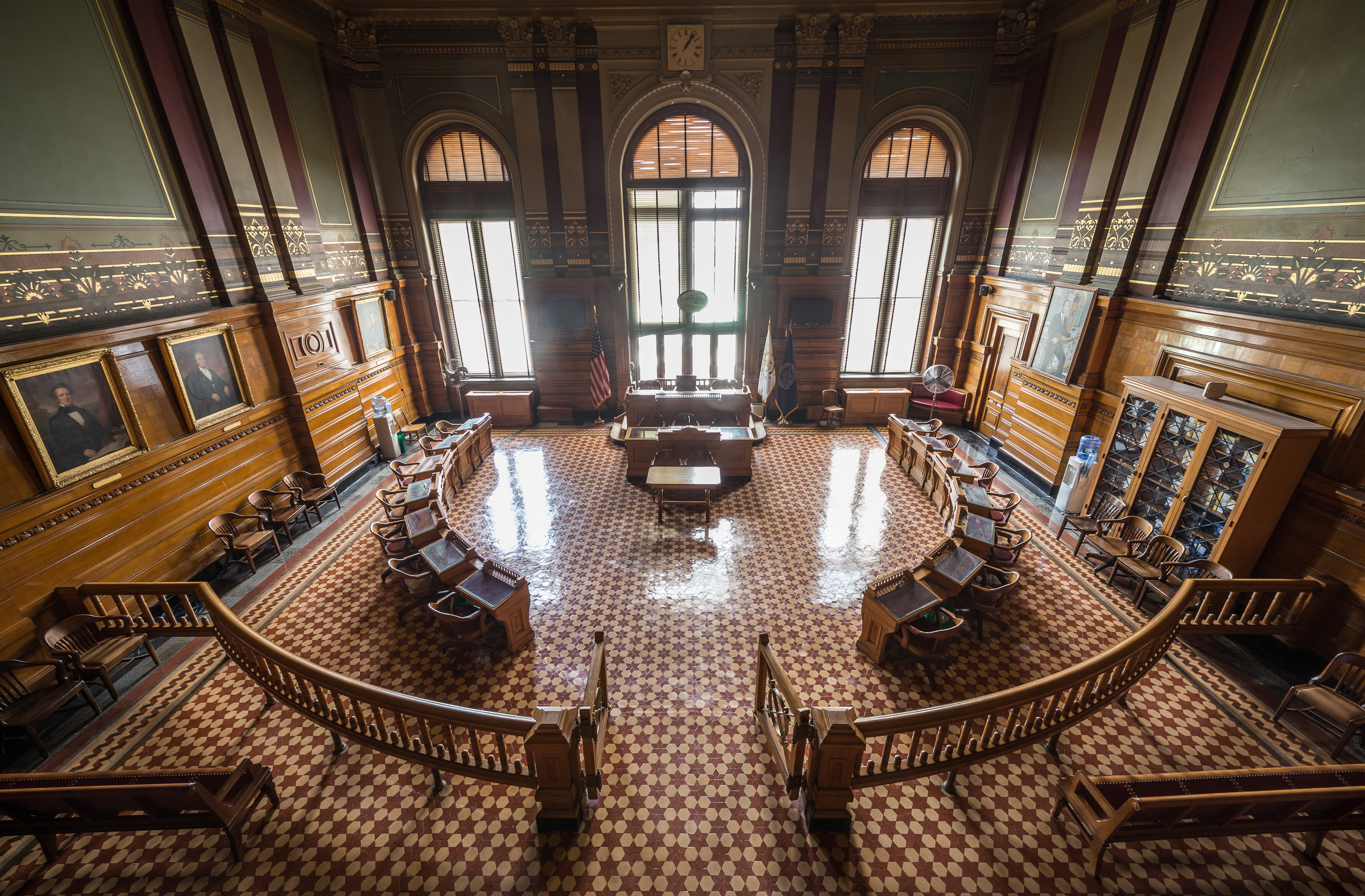
Providence City Council chambers

The Providence City Council consists of 15 councilors, one for each of the city's wards, who enact ordinances and pass an annual budget. Providence uses a strong-mayor form of government in which the city council acts as a check against the power of the executive branch, the mayor. The members of the Providence City Council are elected by residents of the fifteen wards of Providence. City Council members are elected to four-year terms and are limited, by City Charter, to serving a maximum of three consecutive full terms (excluding any partial term of less than two years previously served).

As the state capital, Providence houses the Rhode Island General Assembly, as well as the offices of the Governor and the Lieutenant Governor in the Rhode Island State House. Providence also has probate and superior courts. The U.S. District Court for the District of Rhode Island is located downtown across from Providence City Hall adjacent to Kennedy Plaza.

== Education ==
Universities and colleges

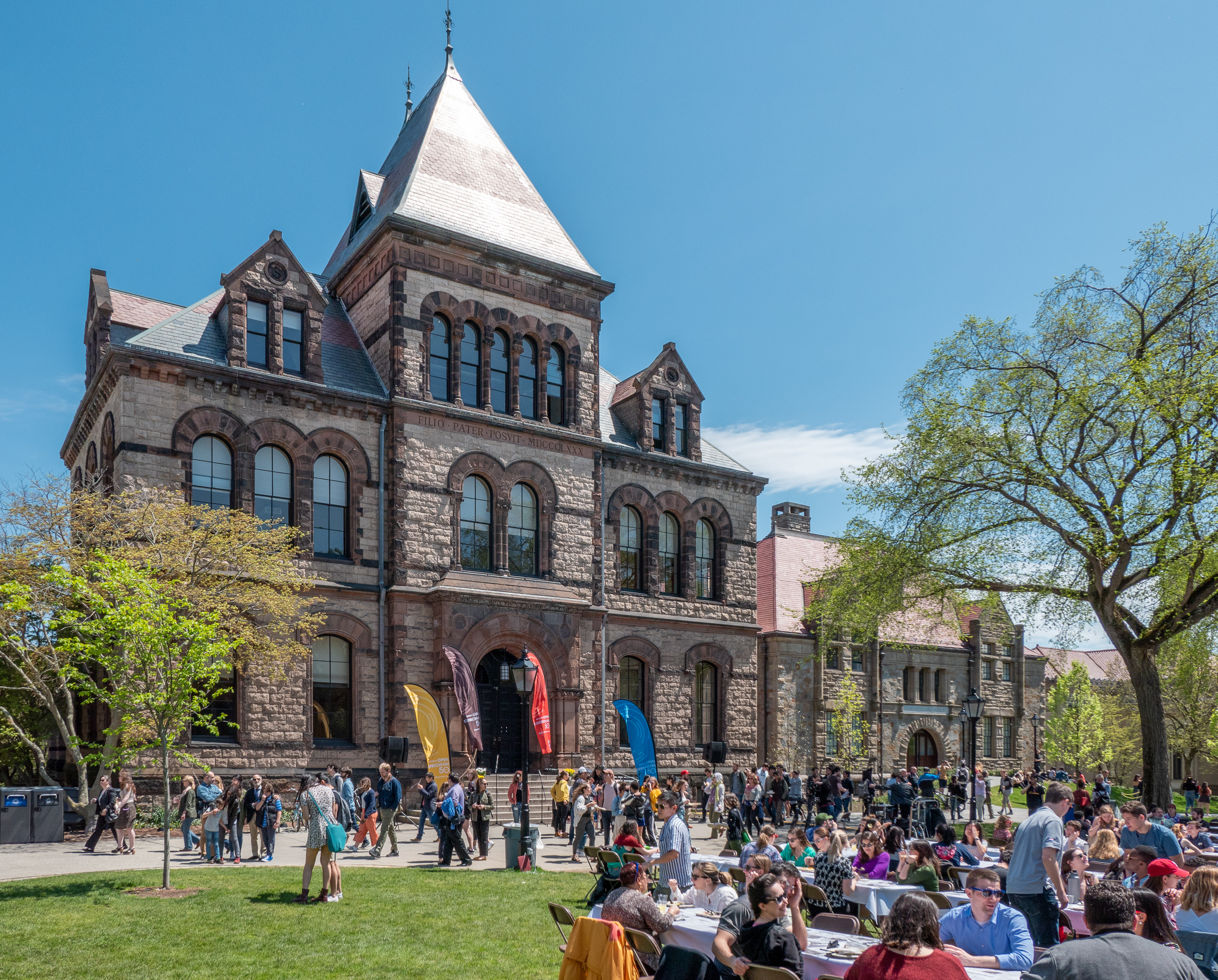
Brown University

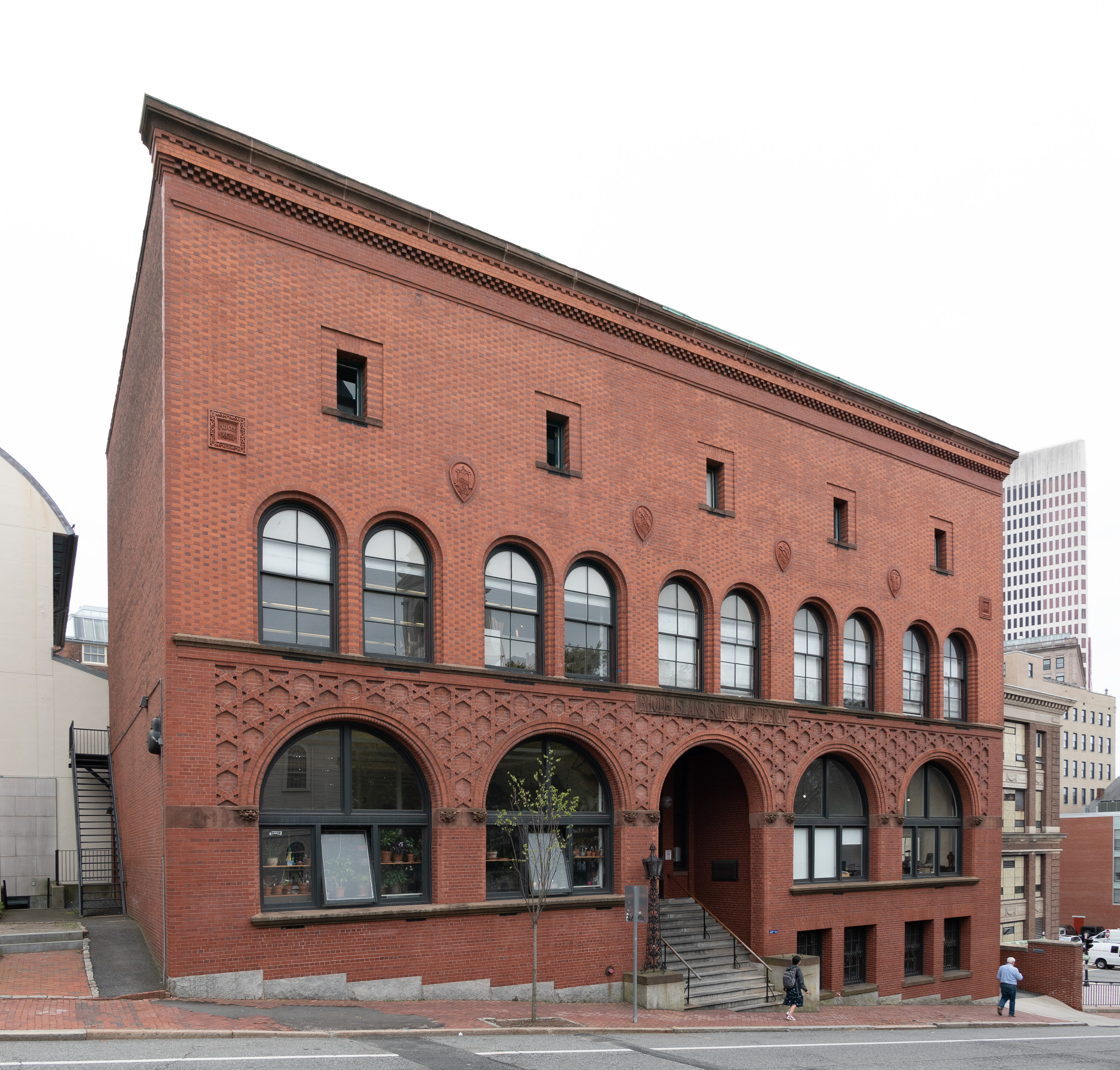
RISD

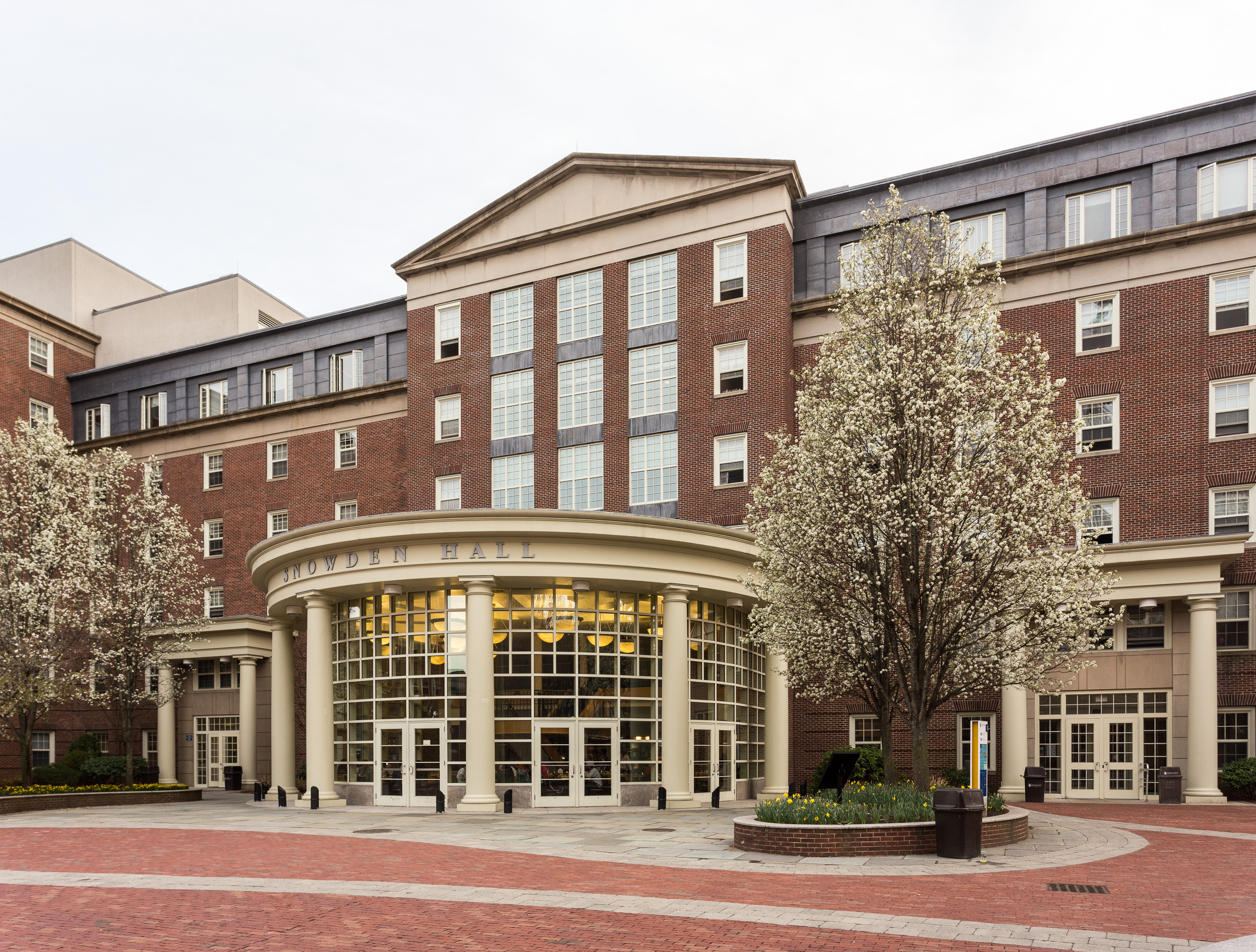
Johnson & Wales

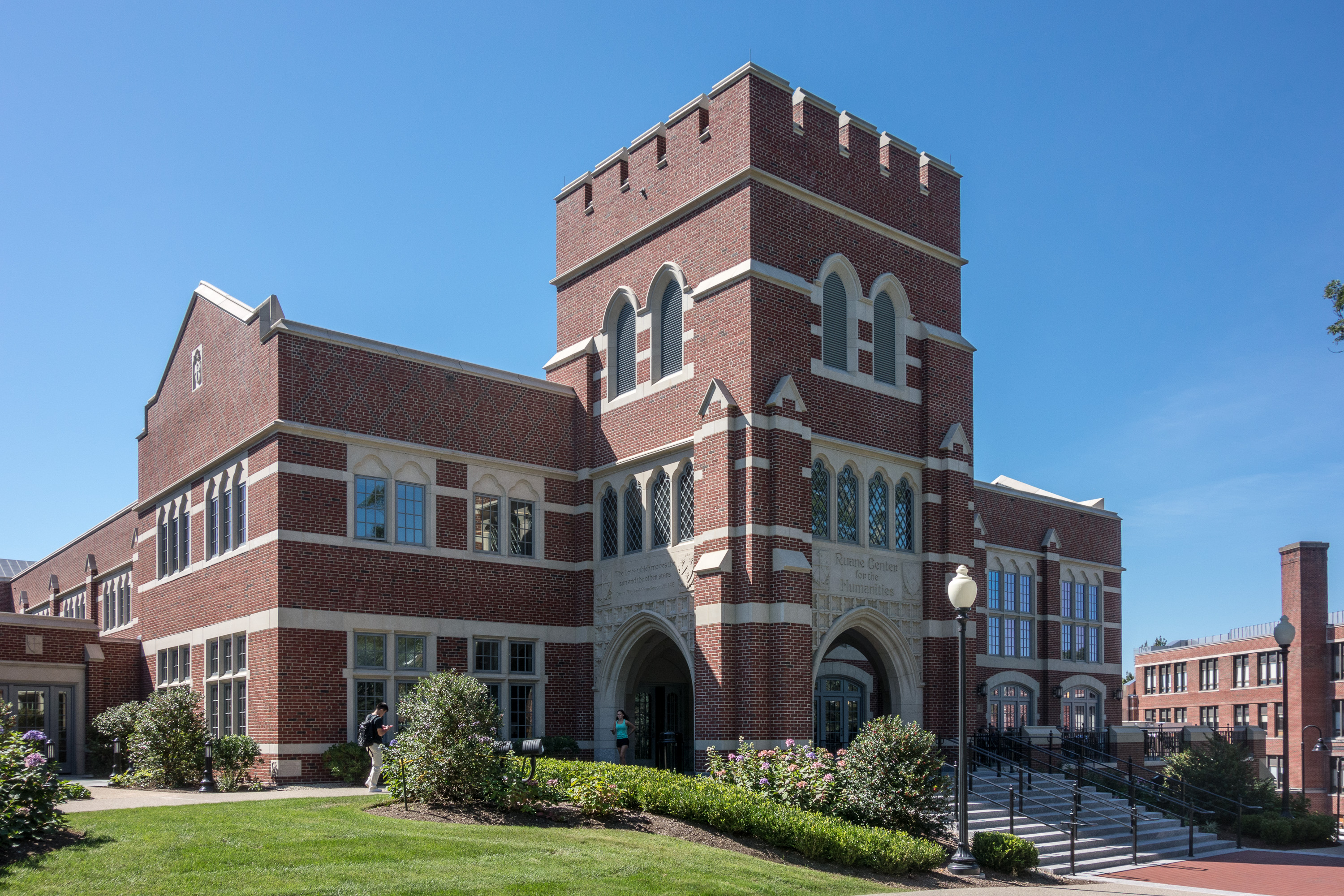
Providence College

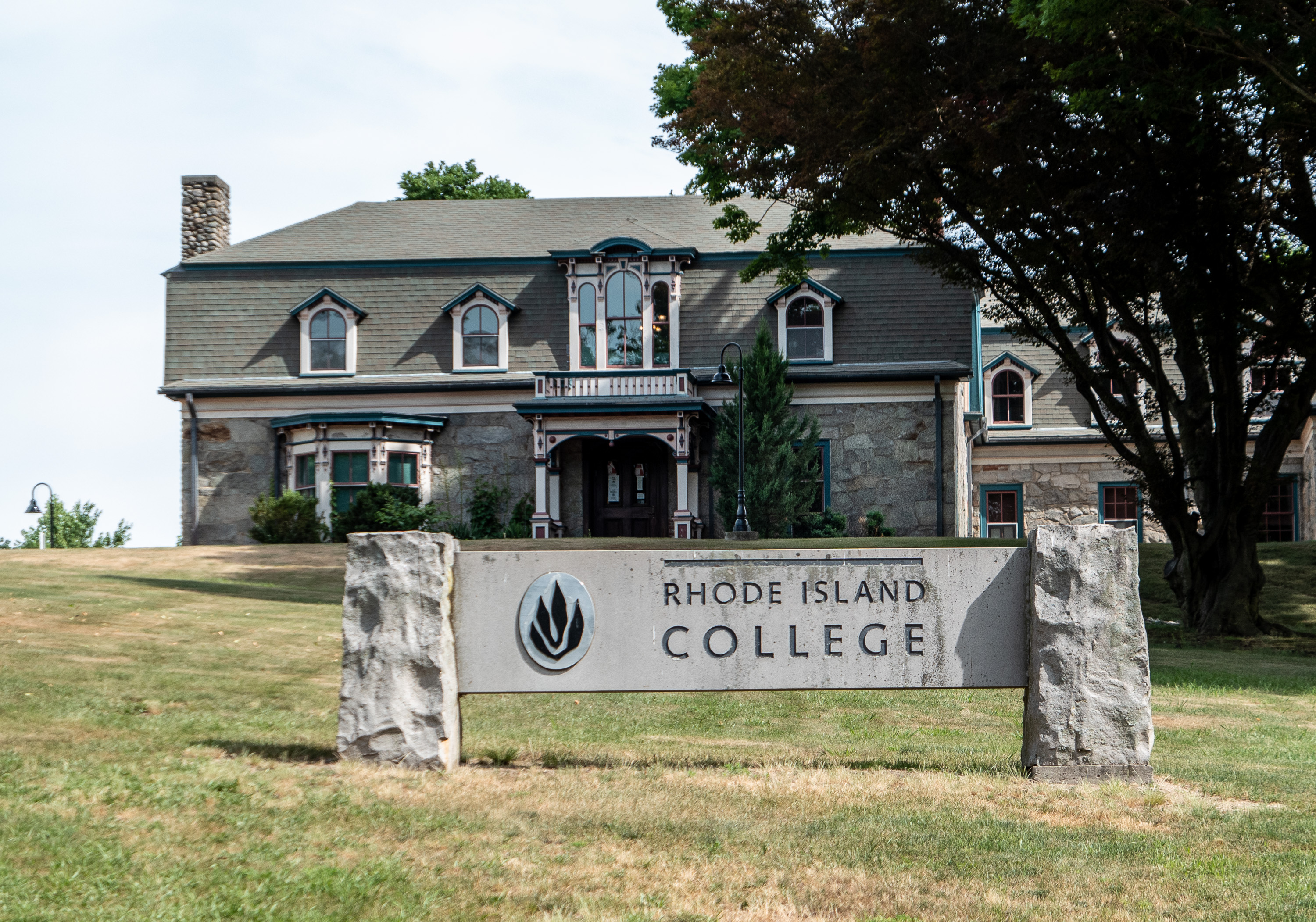
Rhode Island College

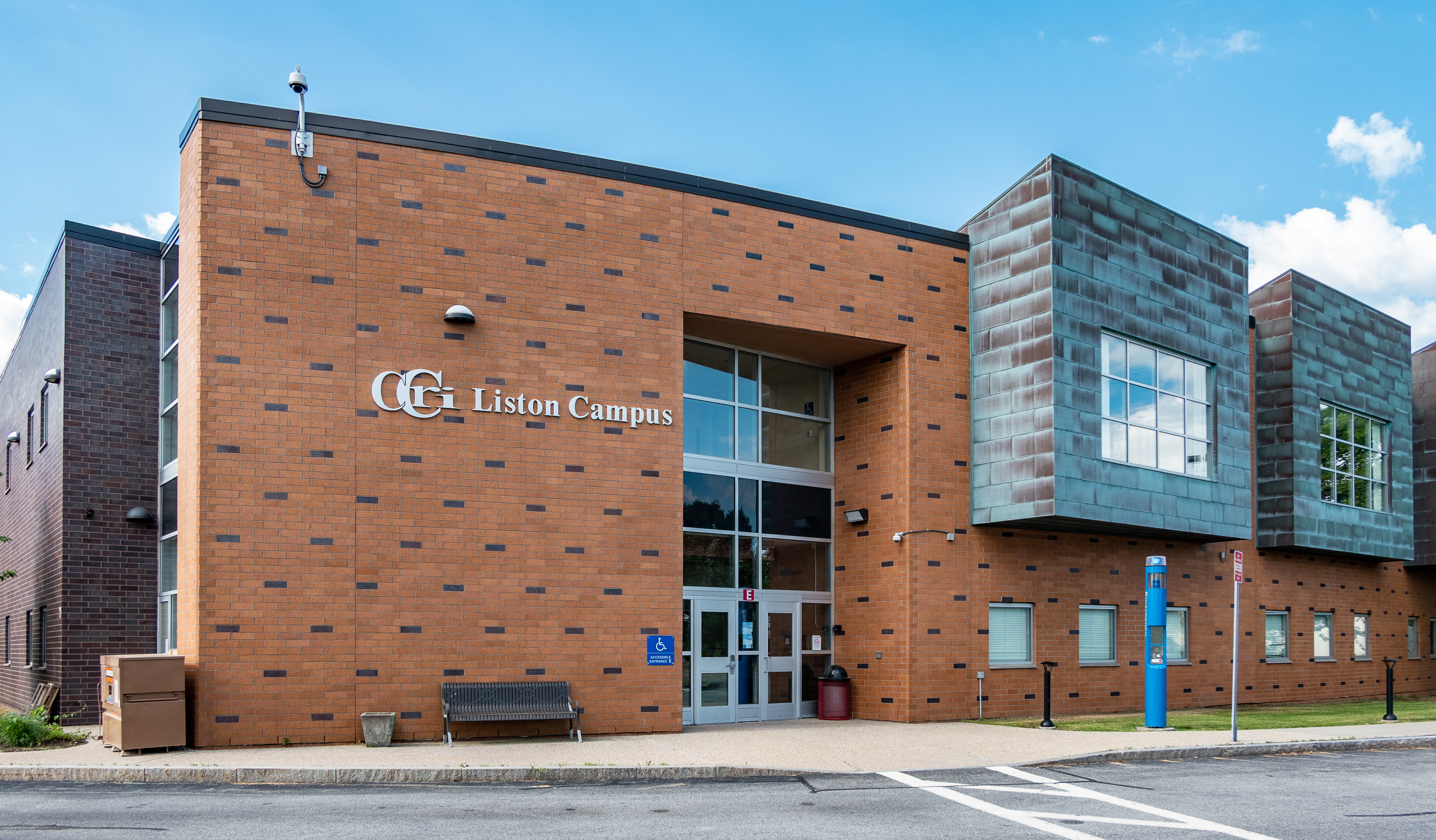
Community College of Rhode Island

=== Primary and secondary education ===
The Providence Public School District serves about 21,700 students from pre-Kindergarten to grade 12 as of July 2022. The district has 21 elementary schools, seven middle schools, and nine high schools. The Providence Public School District includes magnet schools at the middle and high school level, Nathanael Greene and Classical respectively. There are two separate centers for students with special needs. Two public charter schools, Time Squared Academy High School (K–12) and Textron Chamber of Commerce (9–12), are funded by GTECH Corporation and Textron respectively. Overall, the public high school graduation rate as of 2019 is 74%, which is below the statewide rate of 84% and the national average of 87%.

A number of private schools also serve Providence students. The city's South Side is home to Community Preparatory School, a private school serving primarily low-income students in grades 3 through 8. There are several private schools in the city's East Side, including Moses Brown (Quaker-affiliated), the Lincoln School, the Wheeler School, and Providence Hebrew Day School (Orthodox Judaism-affiliated). La Salle Academy, a Catholic college preparatory school, is located in the North End, near Providence College.

=== College and universities ===
The main campuses of five of Rhode Island's colleges and universities are in Providence (city proper):

- Brown University, an Ivy League university and one of nine colonial colleges in the nation
- Johnson & Wales University
- Providence College
- Rhode Island College, the state's oldest public college
- Rhode Island School of Design (RISD)

In addition, the Community College of Rhode Island, Roger Williams University, and University of Rhode Island have satellite campuses in the city. Between these schools, the number of post-secondary students is between 32,000 and 44,000. Higher education exerts a considerable presence in the city's politics and economy, compounded by the fact that Brown University is the city's second-largest employer.

== Media ==
Providence is the center of Southern New England's broadcasting market, which also encompasses Bristol County, Massachusetts, which includes the cities of Fall River and New Bedford. The city is served by television stations representing every major American television network, as well as radio stations originating from Providence and Boston.

== Infrastructure ==
=== Health and medicine ===
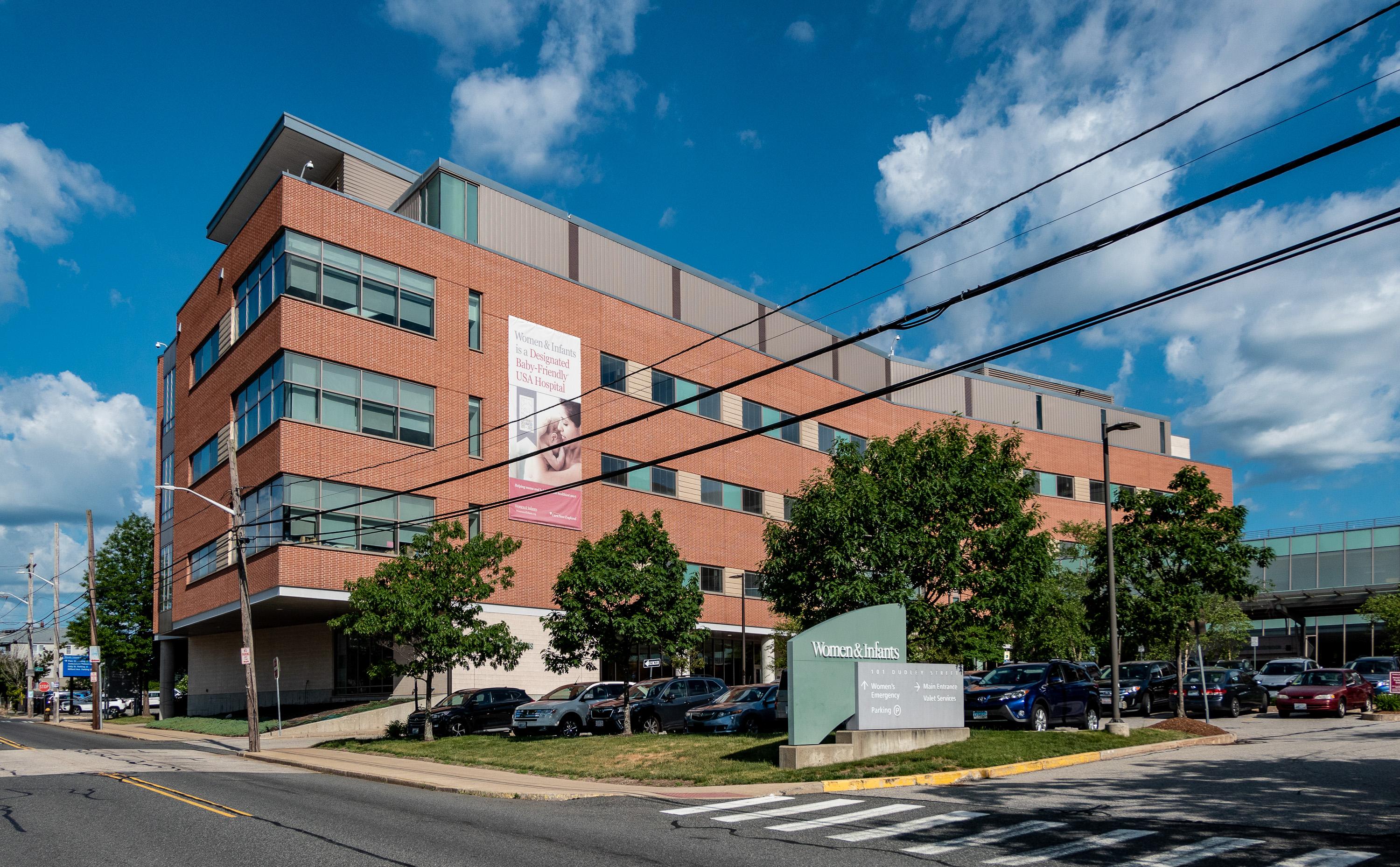
Women & Infants Hospital

Providence is home to eight hospitals, most prominently Rhode Island Hospital, the largest general acute care hospital in the state. It is also the Level I Trauma Center for Rhode Island, Southeastern Massachusetts and parts of Connecticut. The hospital is in a complex that includes Hasbro Children's Hospital and Women and Infants Hospital. The city is also home to the Roger Williams Medical Center, St. Joseph Hospital For Specialty Care (a division of St. Joseph Health Services Of Rhode Island), The Miriam Hospital, a major teaching affiliate associated with the Alpert Medical School of Brown University, as well as a Veterans Affairs medical center.

=== Transportation ===
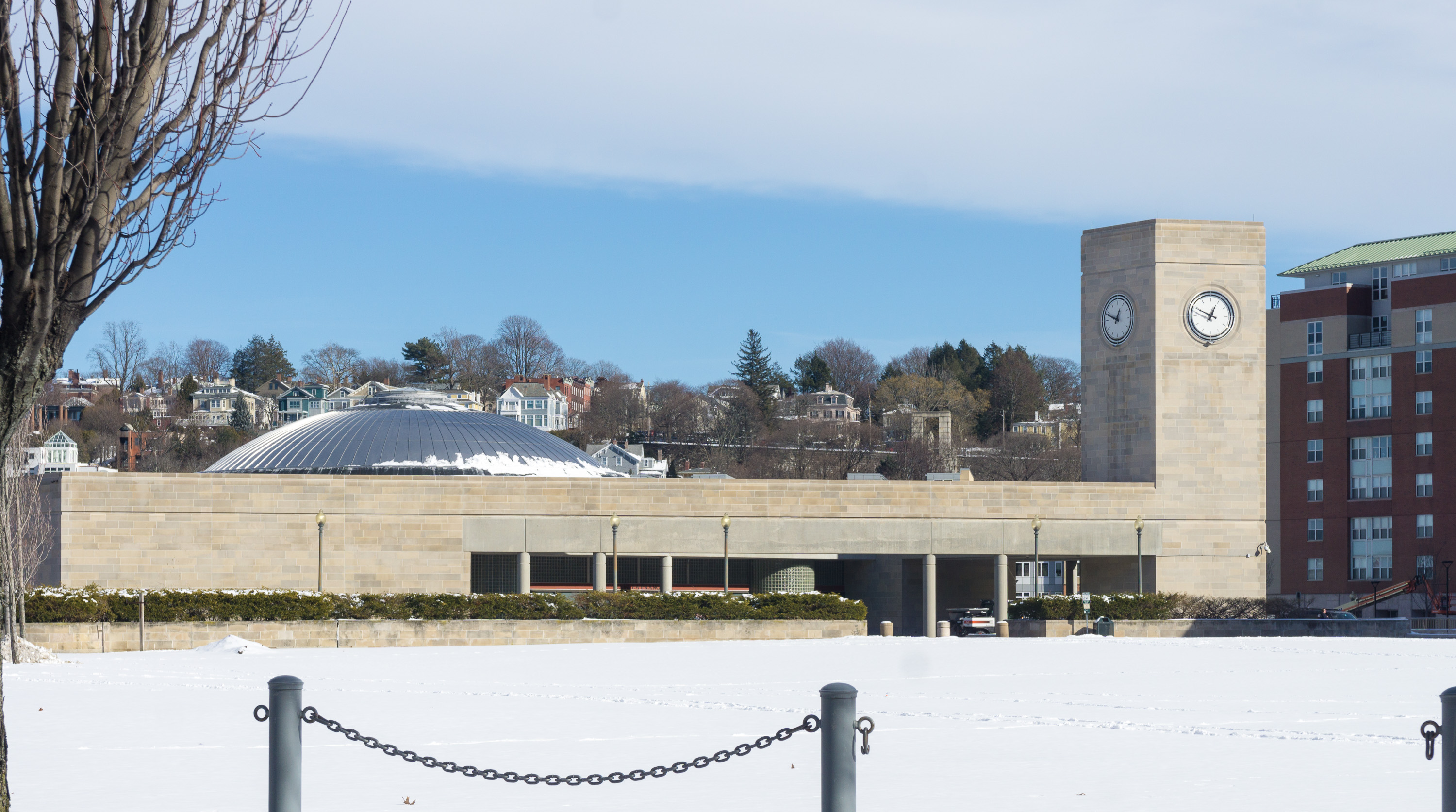
Providence Station

Providence is served by T. F. Green Airport in Warwick, and general aviation fields also serve the region. Massport has been promoting T. F. Green as an alternative to Boston's Logan International Airport because of over-crowding. Providence Station is located between the Rhode Island State House and the Downtown district and is served by Amtrak and MBTA Commuter Rail services, with a commuter rail route running north to Boston and south to T.F. Green Airport and Wickford Junction. Approximately 2,400 passengers pass through the station per day.

I-95 runs from north to south through Providence; I-195 connects the city to eastern Rhode Island and southeastern Massachusetts, including New Bedford, Massachusetts and Cape Cod. I-295 encircles Providence, while RI 146 provides a direct connection with Worcester, Massachusetts. The city began the long-term project Iway in 2007 to move I-195 for safety reasons, to free up land, and to reunify the Jewelry District with Downtown Providence, which had been separated by the highway. The project was estimated to cost $610 million.

The Port of Providence (branded as ProvPort) is the second-largest deep-water seaport in New England. In 1994, the city incorporated ProvPort as an independent non-profit. It is located on a single campus on the west side of the Providence River, next to the Washington Park neighborhood. As of 2021, operations are contracted to Waterson Terminal Services, which also operates terminals at the Port of New Bedford in Massachusetts and in Davisville, Rhode Island. ProvPort handles cargoes such as cement, chemicals, heavy machinery, petroleum, and scrap metal.

Kennedy Plaza in Downtown Providence serves as a transportation hub for local public transit as well as a departure point for Peter Pan Bus Lines and Greyhound Lines. Public transit is managed by Rhode Island Public Transit Authority (RIPTA). Through RIPTA alone, Kennedy Plaza averages more than 71,000 people a day. The majority of the area covered by RIPTA is served by traditional buses, but RIPTA also runs a "Rapid Bus", the R-Line which connects the suburbs of Pawtucket and Cranston with Downtown Providence. Of particular note is the East Side Trolley Tunnel running under College Hill, whose use is reserved for RIPTA buses. From 2000 to 2008, RIPTA operated a seasonal ferry to Newport between May and October, but SeaStreak began operating that ferry route in 2016. In 2020, RIPTA completed construction of the Downtown Transit Connector, an upgraded bus rapid transit service to run from Providence Station to the Hospital District.

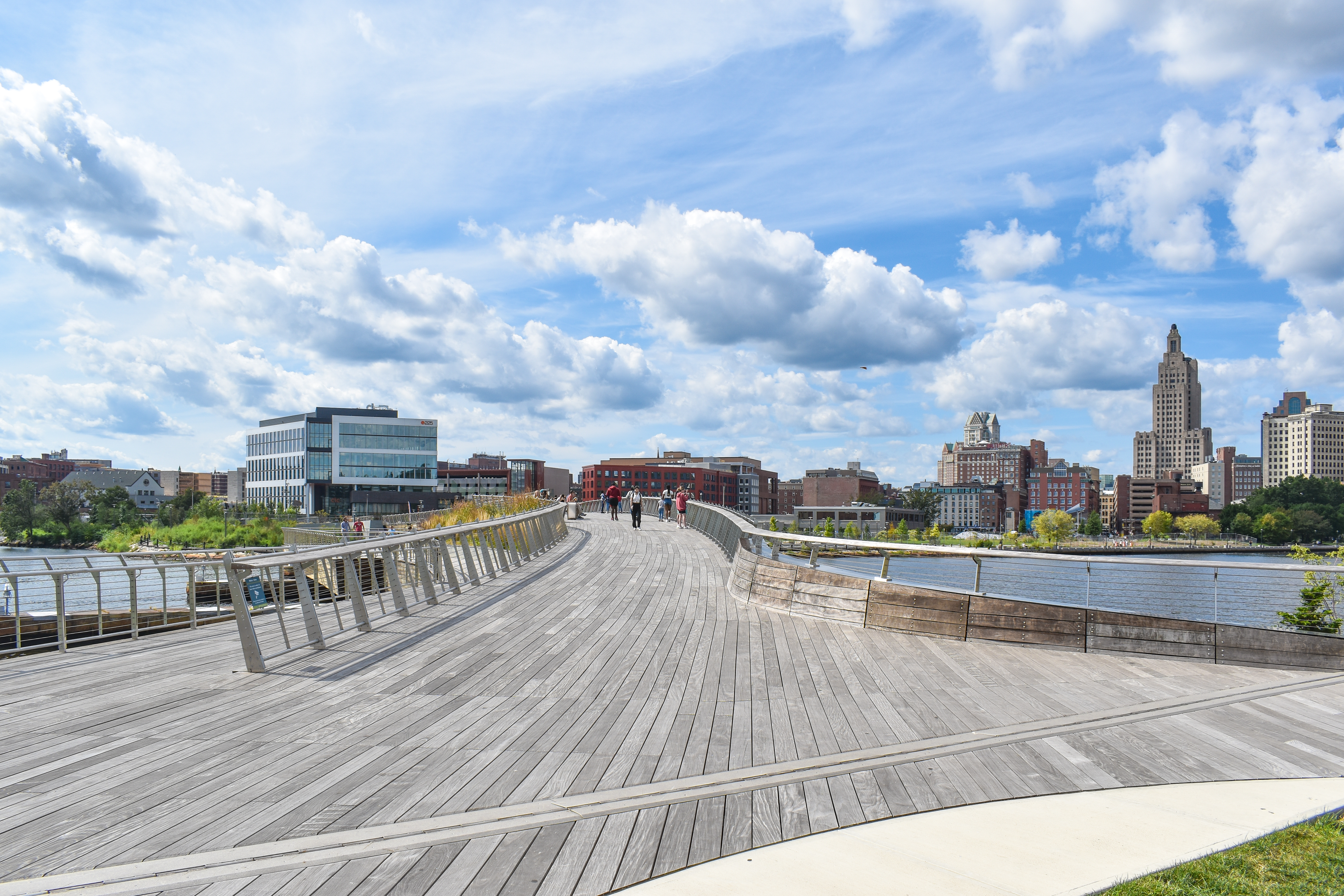
The Michael S. Van Leesten Memorial Bridge opened in August 2019

The city serves as the end point for four of the state's major traffic-free bicycle paths: the East Bay Bike Path, Washington Secondary Rail Trail, the Woonasquatucket Greenway Bike Path, and the Blackstone River Greenway. There are several dedicated on-road bicycle lanes within the city.

In 2017, the city signed a $400,000 contract with a bicycle sharing company, Jump, to introduce Providence's first program of its kind, supported by local hospitals and RIPTA. Shortly after the program started in September 2018, the bicycles became associated with a "wave of vandalism and criminal activity" including widespread thefts of bicycles, bikes tossed into the Providence River, and even a company technician held at gunpoint. The company suspended the program in August 2019. In 2021, a new company, Spin, reintroduced a bike sharing program to the city.

In August 2019, a pedestrian bridge opened, spanning the Providence River and connecting Providence's east and west sides. The bridge was constructed on the granite piers of the old Route 195 bridge.

In January 2020, mayor Jorge Elorza unveiled a "Great Streets" initiative to create a framework of public space improvements to encourage walking, riding bicycles, and public transit. The plan includes establishing an "Urban Trail Network" which includes 60 miles (97 km) of bicycle paths, bike lanes, and greenways.

=== Utilities ===
Electricity and natural gas are provided by Rhode Island Energy, which took over from National Grid in May 2022. Providence Water is responsible for the distribution of drinking water, ninety percent of which comes from the Scituate Reservoir about ten miles (16 km) west of downtown, with contributions coming from four smaller bodies of water. The city has history of severe lead problems from old lead pipes, which the city is actively working to replace and offering loans to homeowners to place. The Guardian has criticized the equity of the city's solution. Drinking water in Providence has been rated among the highest quality in the country.

=== Police ===
The headquarters of the city's fire and police departments is a 130,000 square feet (12,000 m^{2}) Public Safety Complex. The building was dedicated in 2002 by former Mayor Vincent Cianci Jr. Providence Police Department operated on a $85.6 million budget in 2020 employing 453 officers.

== Sister cities ==
Providence has five sister cities:

- Praia, Cape Verde (1994)
- Santo Domingo, Dominican Republic (2004)
- Zhuhai, China (2015)
- Guatemala City, Guatemala (2016)
- (Republic of Ireland) Athlone, Ireland (2025)

== Friendship cities ==
- (Republic of Artsakh) Stepanakert, Artsakh (2023)

== See also ==
- List of people from Providence, Rhode Island
- List of tallest buildings in Providence
- National Register of Historic Places listings in Providence, Rhode Island
- USS Providence, 6 ships
