= The Sister Dominica Manor =

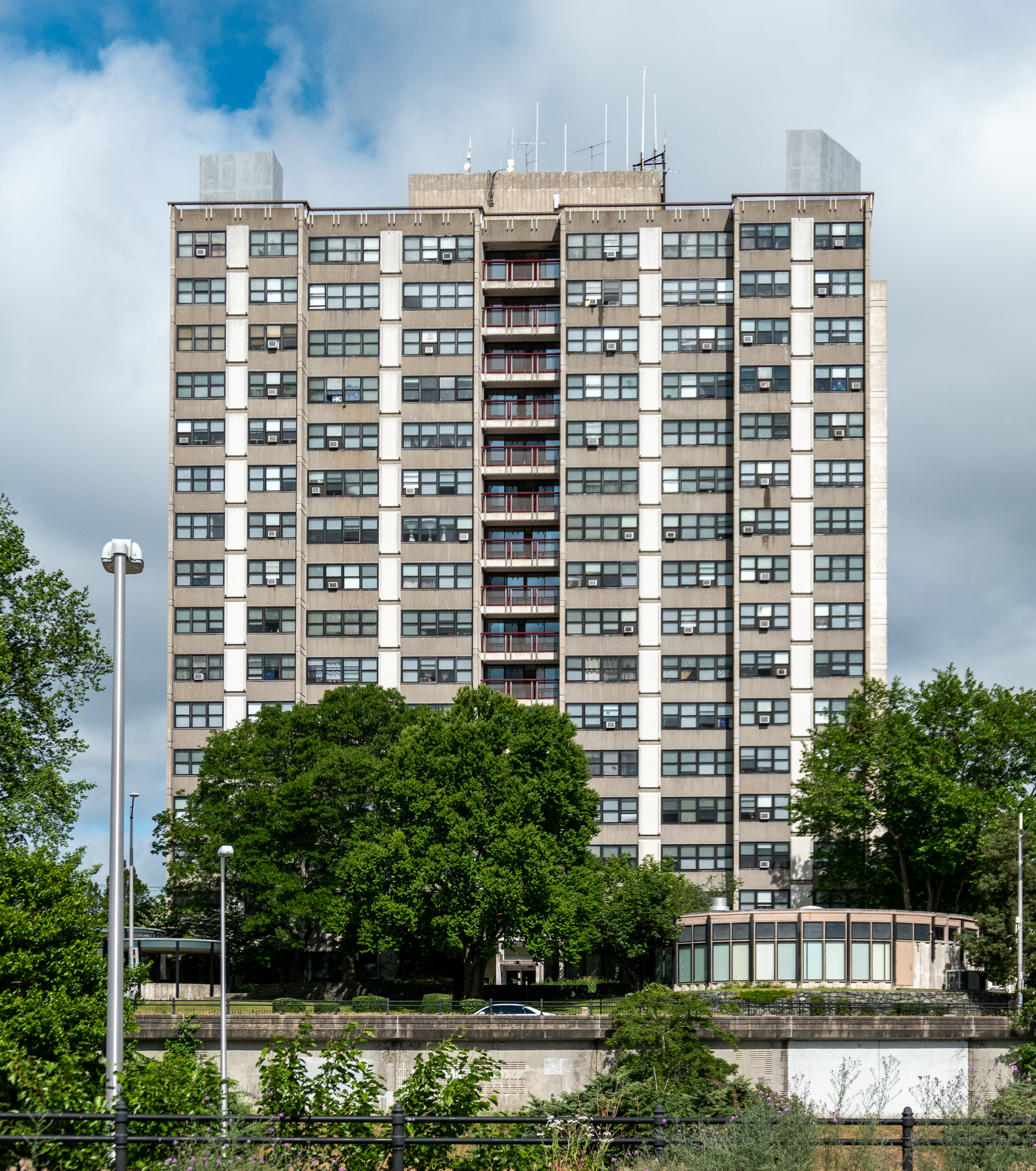
- The Manor from Interstate 95
- Interactive map of the The Sister Dominica Manor area

General information
- Type: Residential
- Location: 100 Atwells Avenue, Providence, RI 02903, United States
- Coordinates: 41°49′21.84″N 71°25′16.69″W
- Completed: 1966

Height
- Roof: 175 ft (53 m)

Technical details
- Floor count: 16

Design and construction
- Developer: Providence Housing Authority

The Sister Dominica Manor, originally known as Bradford House, is a high-rise building located in the Federal Hill district of Providence, Rhode Island. Standing at 175 feet (53 meters), it is currently the 15th-tallest building in the city. The Sister Domininca Manor has 16 floors, and was completed in 1966.

The Sister Dominica Manor was constructed as the tallest of three low-income elderly housing projects built by Rhode Island Housing and the city of Providence in the 1960s. It was the tallest all-residential building in Providence until late 2007, when the Waterplace Towers were completed.
