= The Empire at Broadway =

General information
- Location: Providence, RI, USA

Height
- Roof: 324 ft (99 m)

Technical details
- Floor count: 22

Design and construction
- Architect(s): The Procaccianti Group

The Empire at Broadway was a planned high-rise office tower in Providence, Rhode Island. The project was ultimately cancelled, though only after the demolition of the La Salle Square Public Safety Complex, which occupied the planned site.

As planned, the project featured a 22 story office tower with a 522 space parking garage and 496,000 ft^{2} of retail space. If built, the structure would have stood as the 5th tallest in the city and state.

After cancellation, the Procaccianti Group, the developer of the project, converted the site into surface parking.
