= Turk's Head Building =

Office in Providence, Rhode Island

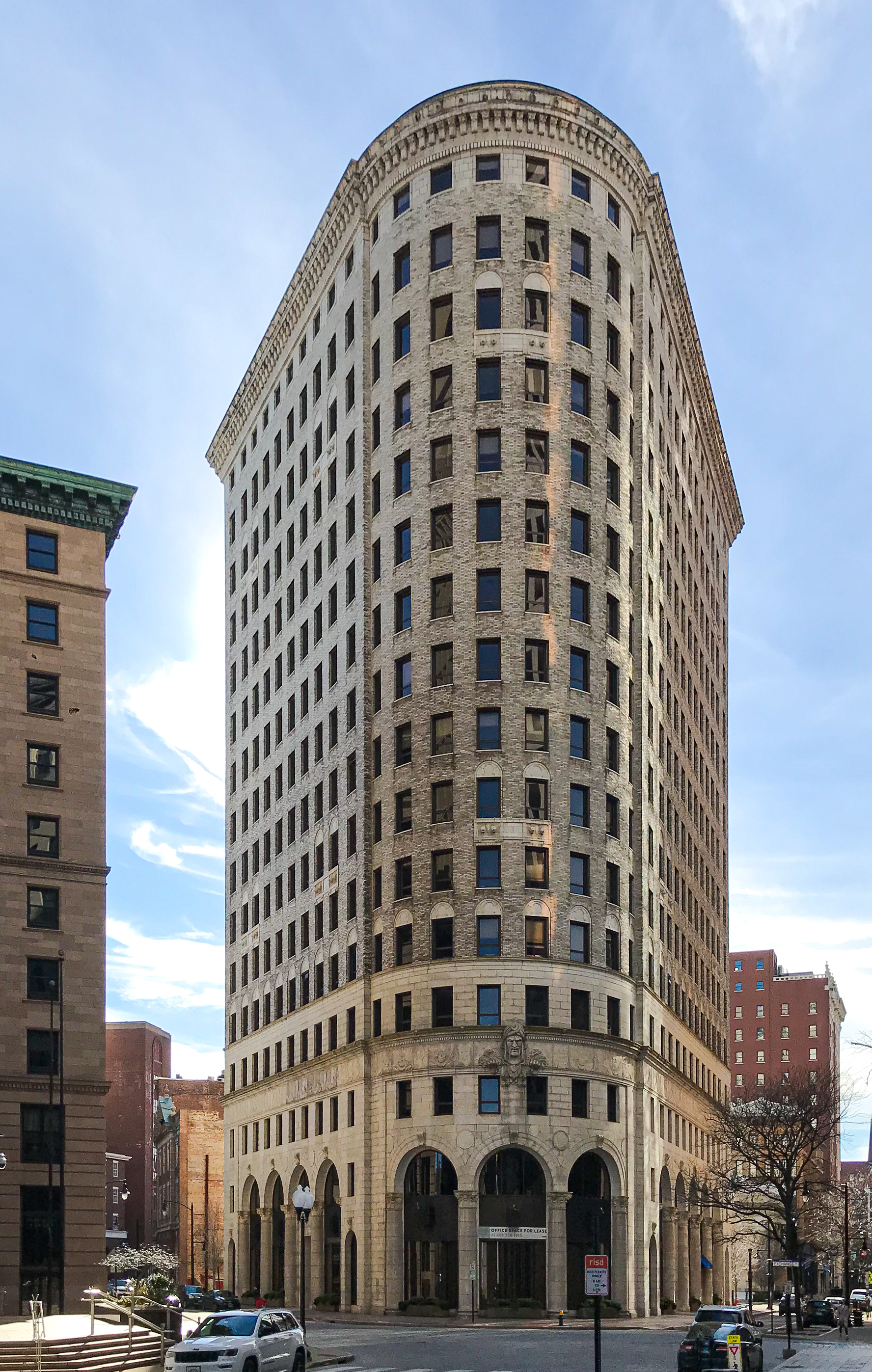
- Interactive map of the Turk's Head Building area

General information
- Type: Office
- Location: Westminster and Weybosset Streets, Providence, RI 02903, United States
- Coordinates: 41°49′28.42″N 71°24′35.5″W
- Completed: 1913

Height
- Roof: 215 ft (66 m)

Technical details
- Floor count: 16

Design and construction
- Architect: Howells & Stokes
- Developer: Brown Land Co.

The Turk's Head Building is a 16-story office high-rise in Providence, Rhode Island completed in 1913. The Turk's Head Building surpassed the 1901 Union Trust Company Building to become the tallest building in downtown. The building retained that title until 1922, when the Providence Biltmore was completed. It is one of the oldest skyscrapers in Providence, standing 215 ft (66 m) tall. It is currently the 11th-tallest building in Providence.

== History ==
The building is designed in a V-shape, and architectural historian William McKenzie Woodward asserts that the architects "clearly had in mind Daniel Burnham's Flatiron Building" in New York City. The skyscraper's peculiar name dates back to the early nineteenth century, when shopkeeper Jacob Whitman mounted a ship's figurehead above his store. The figurehead came from the ship Sultan and depicted the head of an Ottoman warrior. Whitman's store was called "At the sign of the Turk's Head". The figurehead was lost in a storm, but today a stone replica is found on the building's third floor façade.

Brothers Evan and Lloyd Granoff bought the building in 1997 for $4.2 million and spent $3 million renovating it; they sold it in 2008 for $17.55 million to FB Capital Partners. The Granoffs had not been actively trying to sell the building; their attorney advisor said that they accepted the deal because the sum offered was well over its worth.

== Tenants ==
The building is known for the longevity of its tenants. It is home to at least two tenants which have operated in the building for over a century. The investment firm Brown, Lisle/Cummings Inc., and the law firm Gardner, Sawyer, Gates & Sloan both opened their doors in 1913 and kept offices in the building for a century.

== Gallery ==
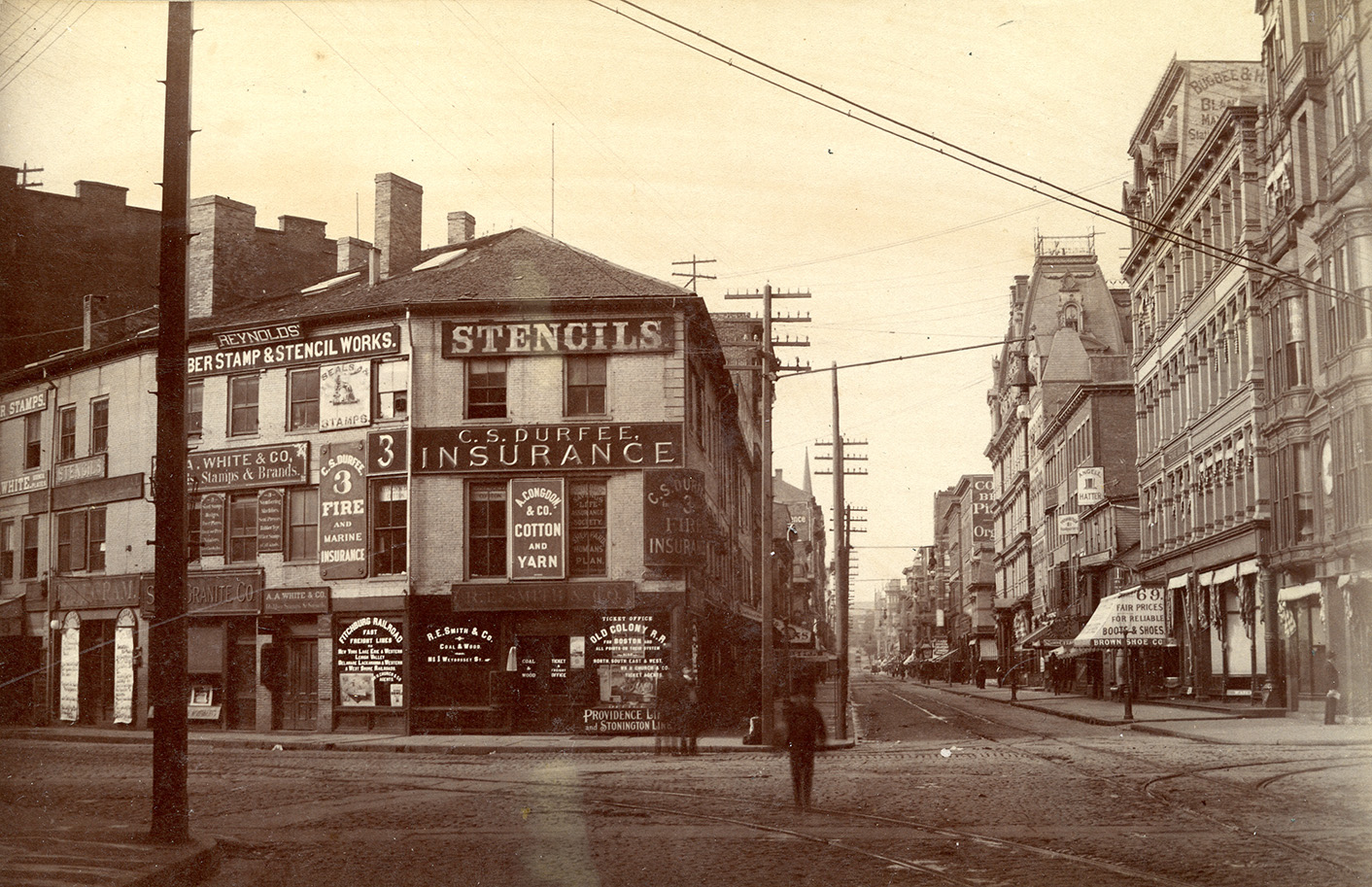
The intersection of Weybosset and Westminster Streets in 1892, prior to the construction of the building

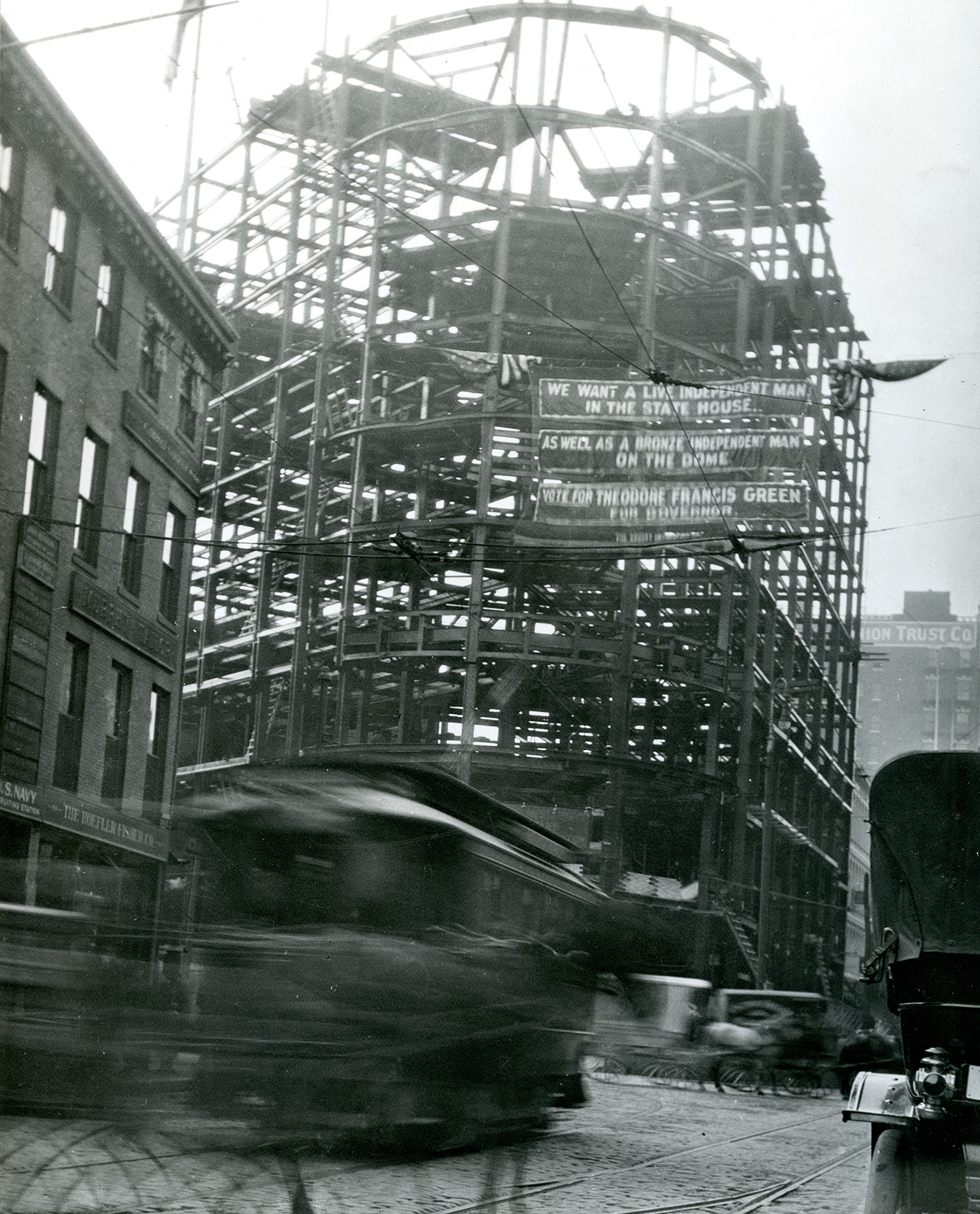
View of the building in the process of being built, 1912

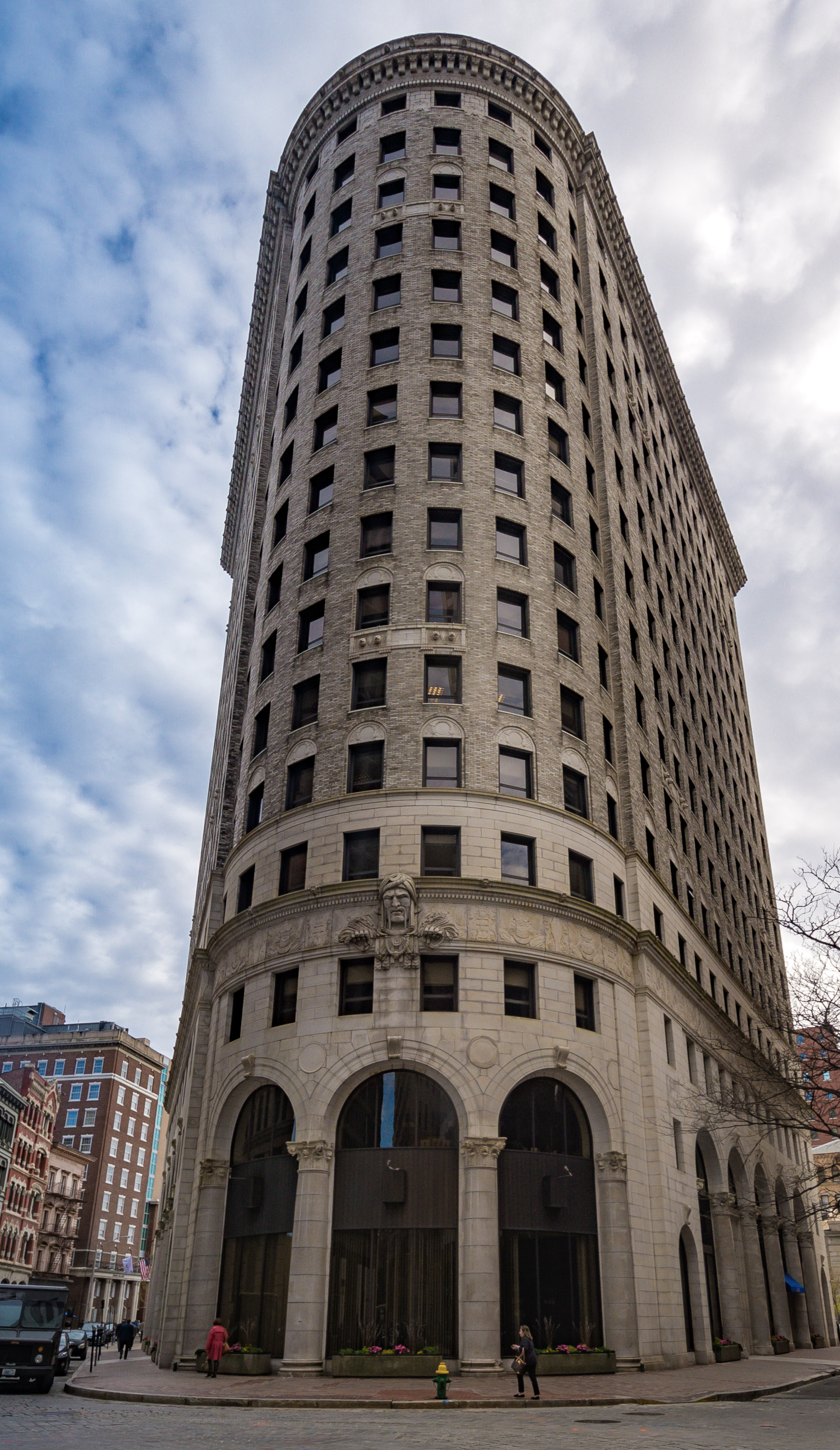
The building's front facade in 2016

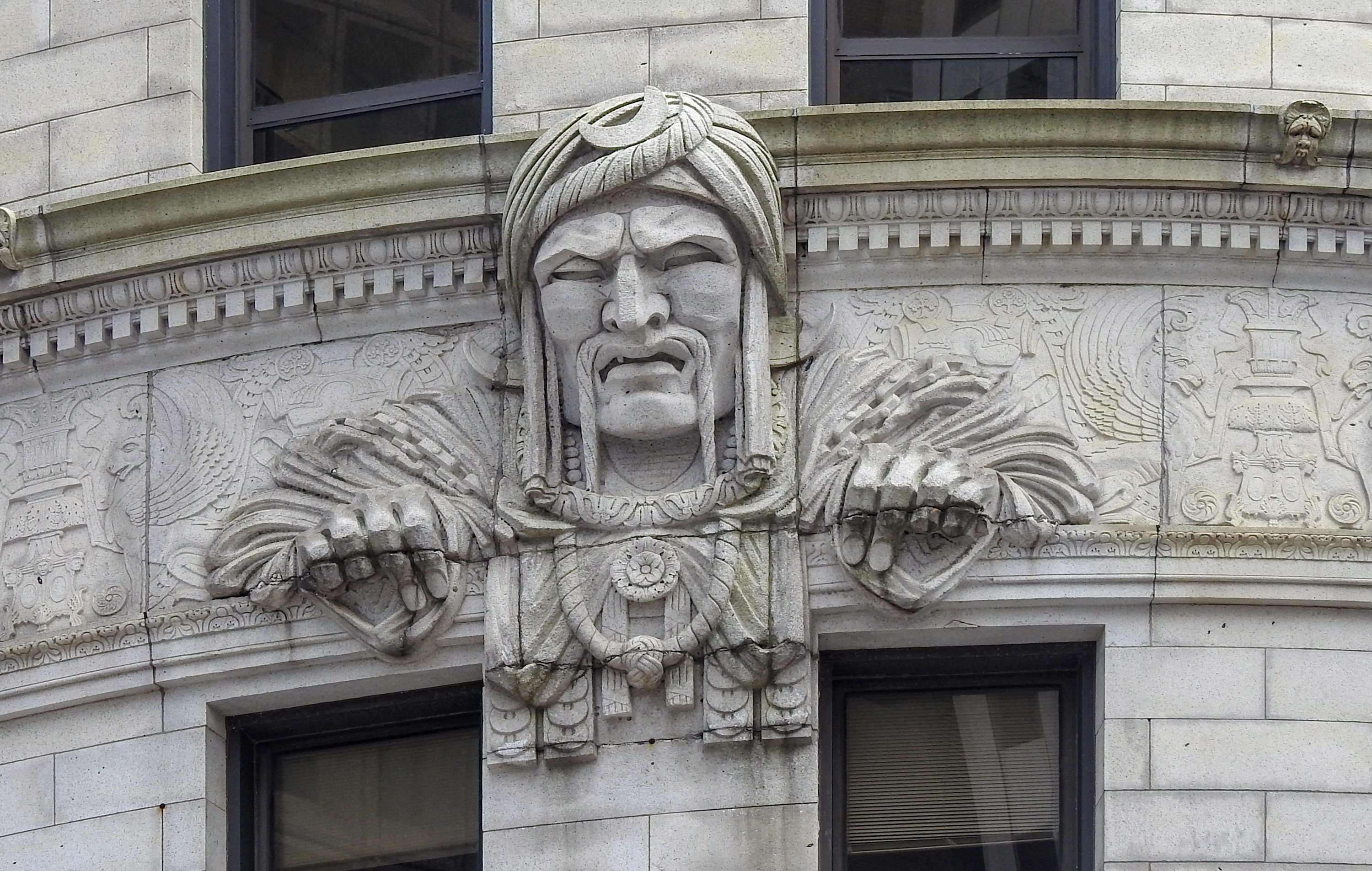
The turbaned figurehead adorning the front of the building

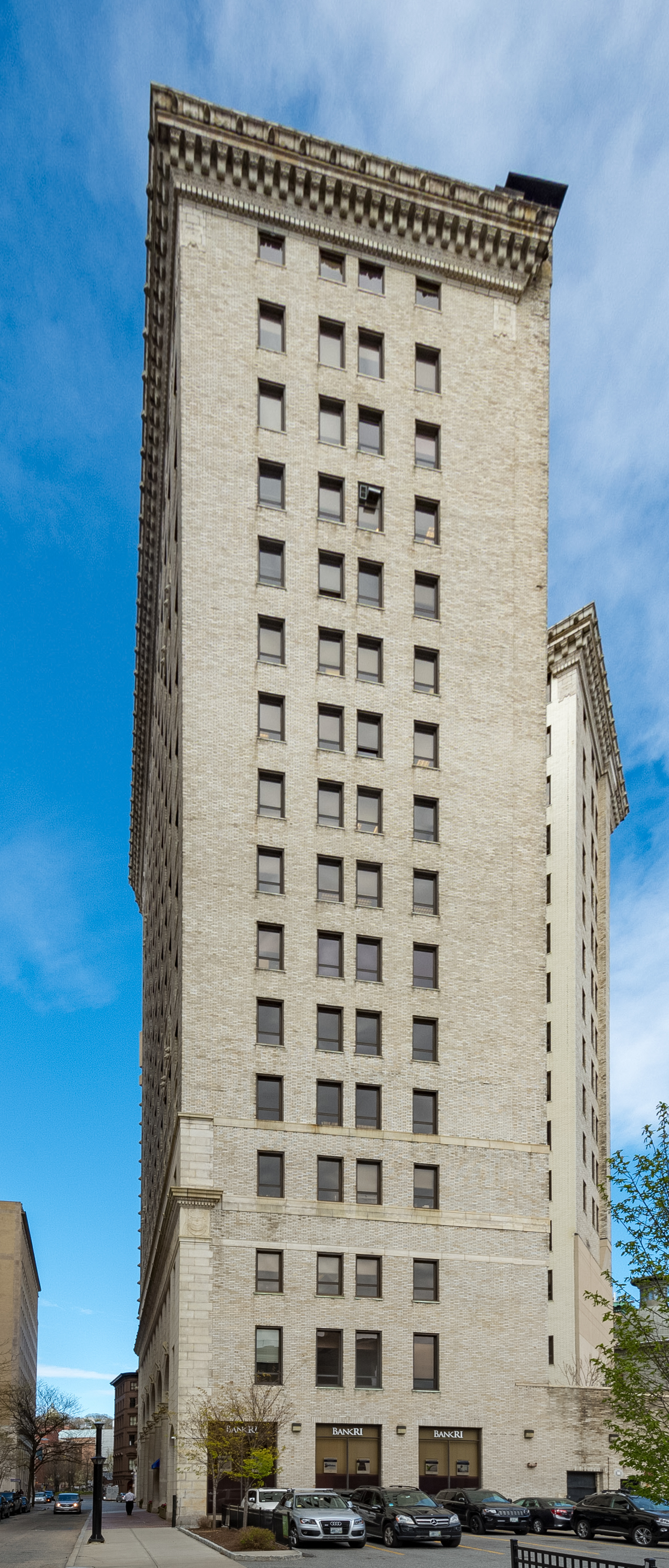
The building's rear, viewed from Westminster Street

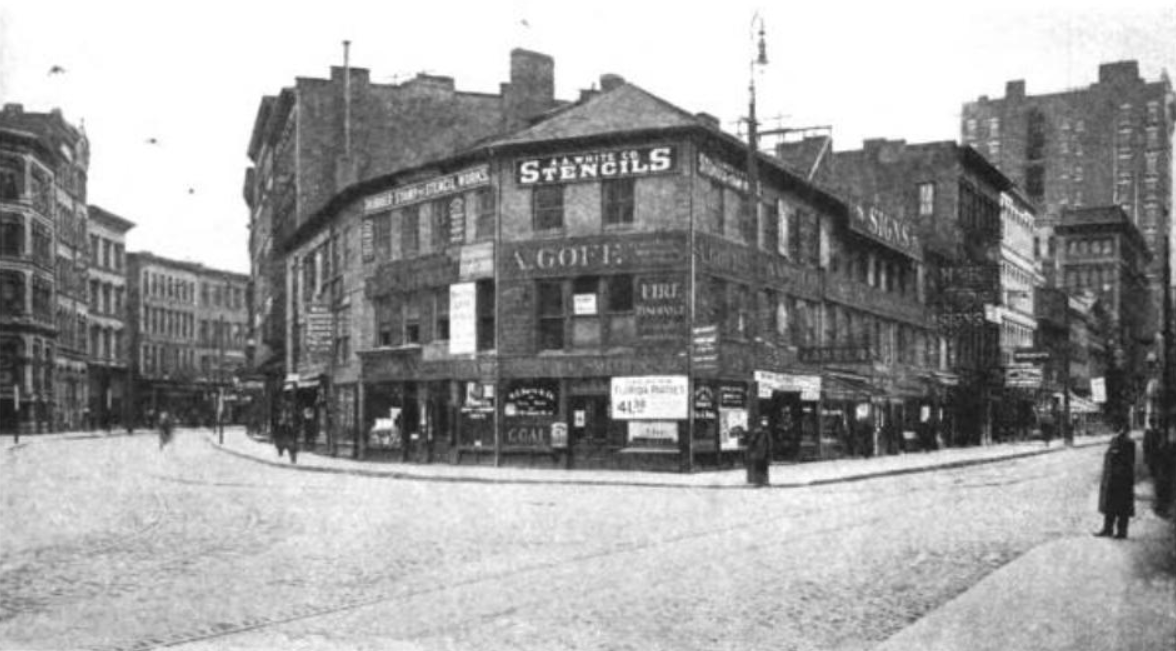
Jacob Whitman's Old Turk's Head Building

== See also ==
- Customhouse Historic District
