= Fleet Center =

Fleet Center may refer to various facilities in the United States:

- TD Garden, a sports arena in Boston, MA
- 50 Kennedy Plaza, an International-style skyscraper in Providence, RI
- The Fleet Science Center, a science museum and planetarium in San Diego, CA

== See also ==
- ARC Centre of Excellence in Future Low-Energy Electronics Technologies, also known as the FLEET Centre
