= Textron Tower =

Skyscraper in downtown Providence, Rhode Island, U.S.

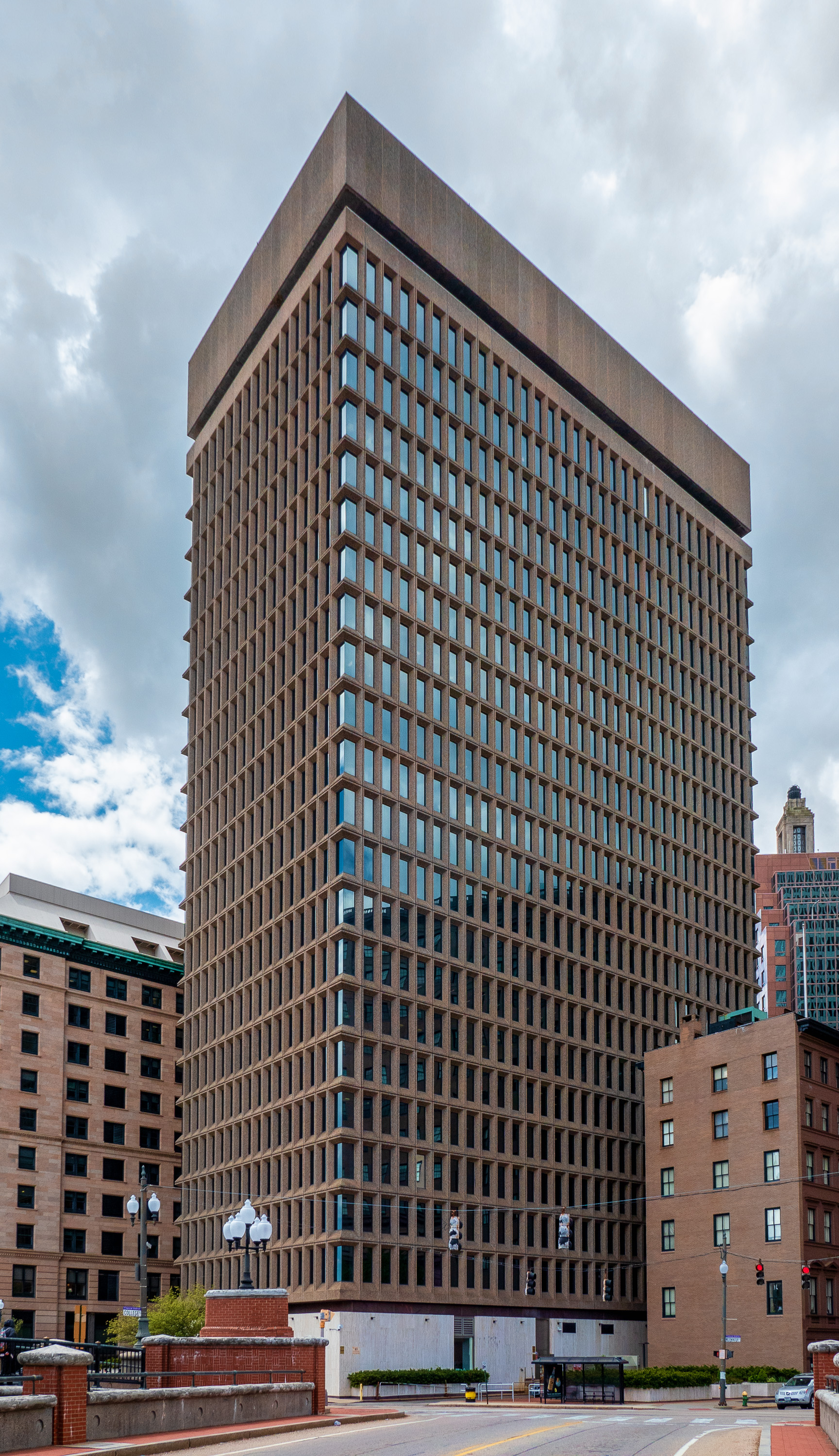

General information
- Type: Office
- Location: 40 Westminster Street, Providence, Rhode Island 02891, U.S.
- Coordinates: 41.8250°N 71.4091°W
- Construction started: 1969
- Completed: 1972

Height
- Roof: 311 ft (95 m)

Technical details
- Floor count: 23

Design and construction
- Architect: Shreve, Lamb and Harmon
- Developer: Textron

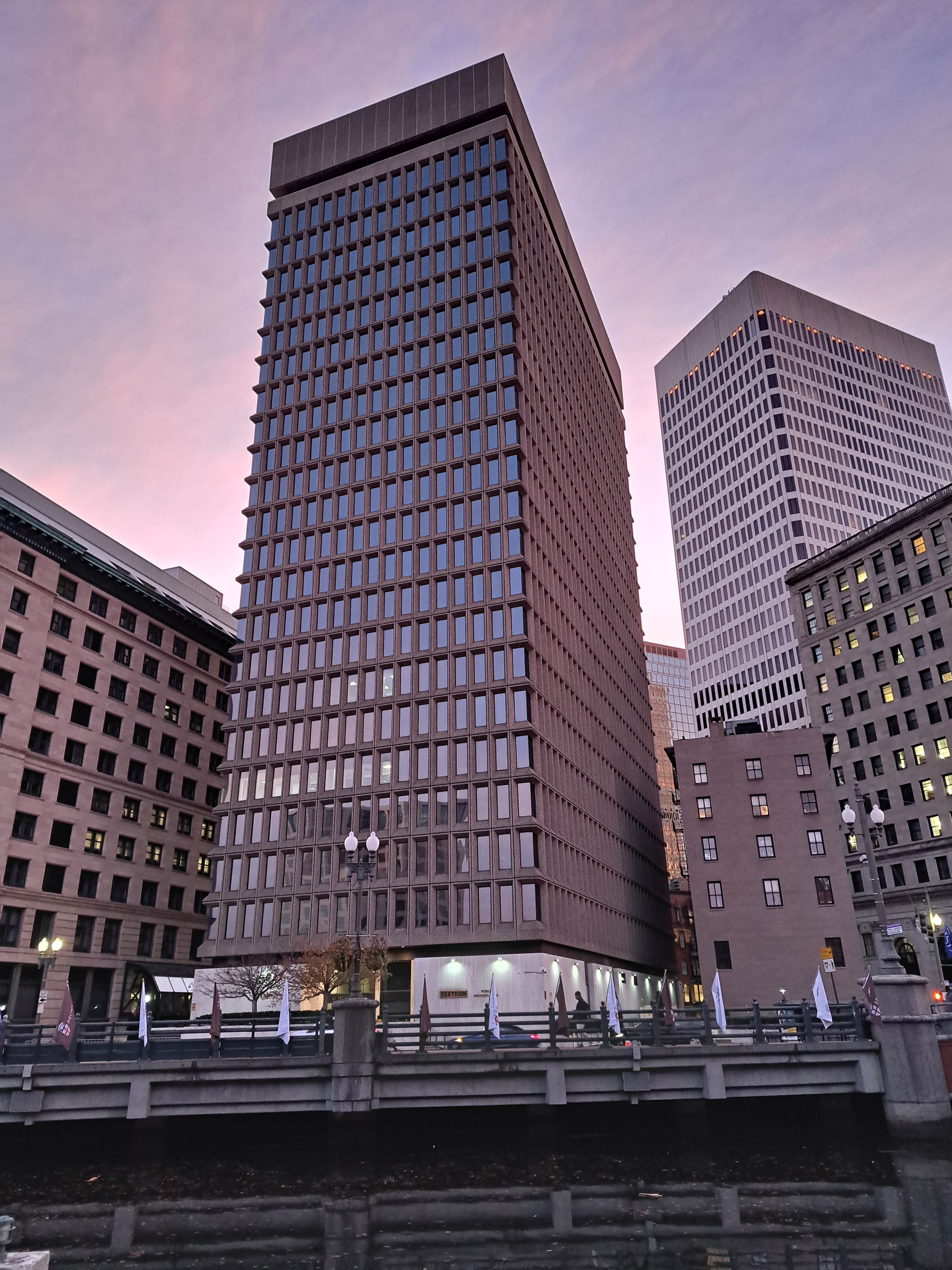

The Textron Tower is a modern skyscraper located at 40 Westminster Street in downtown Providence, Rhode Island, United States. It is the world headquarters of Textron. At 311 ft (95 m), the Textron Tower stands as the 5th-tallest building in the city and the state.

== Architecture ==
The Textron Tower was designed for Textron Corporation by Shreve, Lamb & Harmon, architects of the Empire State Building. The structure is set back some from the building line and raised above the street on a podium. The first story is marbled sheathed and serves as a base for the concrete-grid curtain wall. The building features deep reveals attached to a reinforced concrete frame and is clad with deeply exposed aggregate precast panels.

The structure was included in a 2020 Business Insider article entitled The ugliest skyscraper in every state, adding that its "grid-like exterior is reminiscent of prison architecture."
