= List of tallest buildings in Rhode Island =

Skyscrapers in Rhode Island
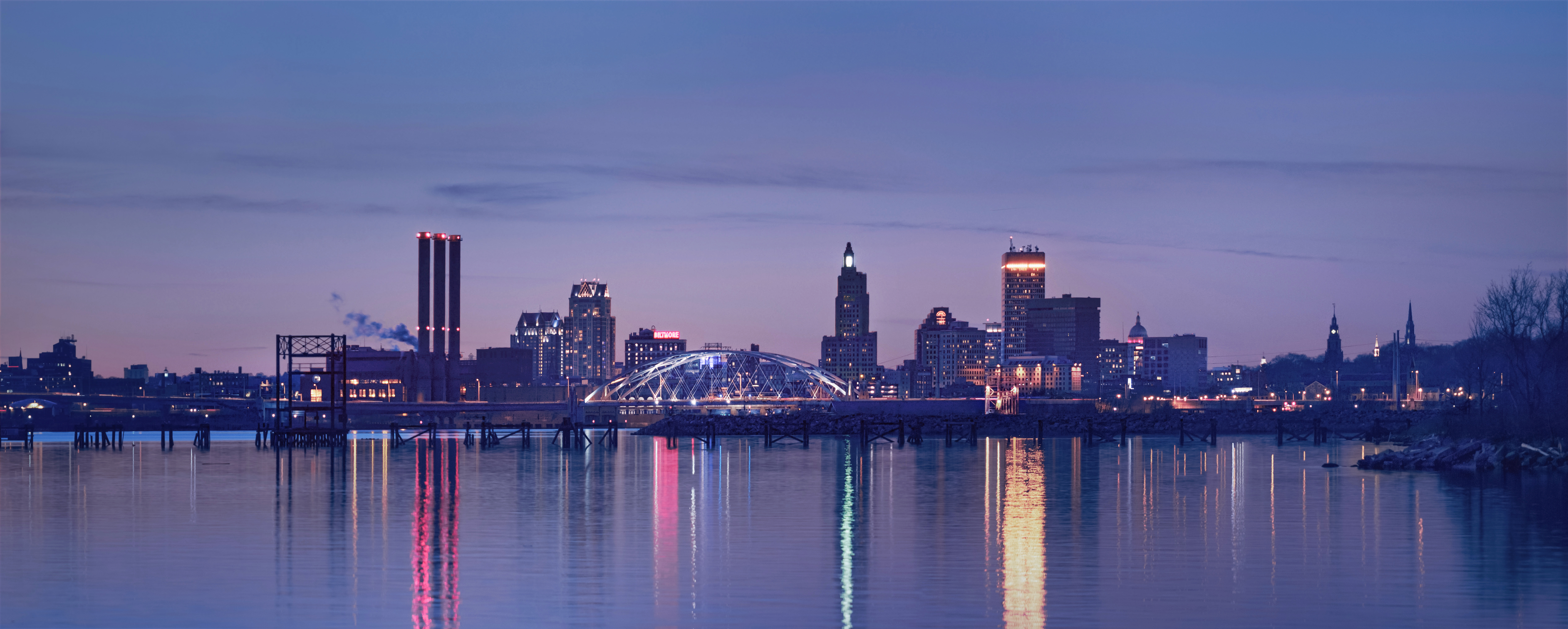
- The skyline of Providence as viewed from across the Providence River
- Tallest building: Industrial National Bank Building (1928)
- Tallest building height: 428 feet (130 m)

Number of tall buildings (2025)
- Taller than 100 m (328 ft): 4

Number of tall buildings — feet
- Taller than 300 ft (91.4 m): 6

A comparison of selected buildings in Providence

The U.S. state of Rhode Island is home to 27 buildings over 175 feet (53 m) in height. Five of these buildings are taller than 300 feet (91 m), all of which are located in the state's capital and largest city, Providence.

The tallest skyscraper in the city and state is the Industrial National Bank Building at 111 Westminster Street in Downtown Providence, which rises 26 floors and 428 feet (130 m). The Industrial National Bank Building, nicknamed the "Superman Building" due to its resemblance to the fictional Daily Planet building from the 1950s TV series, Adventures of Superman, is also the sixth-tallest building in New England outside of Boston. The second-tallest building in Providence is One Financial Plaza, which rises 30 floors and 410 feet (125 m) and was completed in 1973.

As one of the early manufacturing centers in the United States, many of Providence's tallest buildings were constructed prior to 1930; among these are the Industrial National Bank Building, Turk's Head Building, and Bannigan Building. The city went through a second building boom in the 1970s, during which One Financial Plaza and Textron Tower, the city's second and fifth-tallest buildings, were completed. In the 1990s and 2000s, the city again experienced a construction boom. Dubbed the Providence "Renaissance," this period saw the construction of four of the cities ten tallest buildings.

== Tallest buildings ==
This lists ranks Rhode Island structures based on standard height measurement. This includes spires and architectural details but does not include antenna masts. An equal sign (=) following a rank indicates the same height between two or more buildings. The "Year" column indicates the year in which the building was completed.

Rank	Name	Image	Height ft (m)	Floors	Year	Location	Use	Notes
1	Industrial National Bank Building		428 (130)	26	1928	Providence 41°49′28.27″N 71°24′39.89″W	Vacant	The Industrial National Bank Building has been the tallest building in the city and the state since its completion in 1928; The structure has been vacant since 2013; Tallest building in Rhode Island constructed in the 1920s
2	One Financial Plaza		410 (125)	30	1973	Providence 41°49′31.11″N 71°24′36.14″W	Office	Built as the Hospital Trust Tower; Also known as Sovereign Bank Tower; Tallest building in Rhode Island constructed in the 1970s
3	The Residences Providence		380 (116)	31	2007	Providence 41°49′30.32″N 71°24′54.77″W	Residential	Tallest building in Rhode Island constructed in the 2000s
4	Omni Providence Hotel		329 (100)	25	1993	Providence 41°49′31.15″N 71°24′58.5″W	Hotel	Formerly the Westin Providence; Tallest building in Rhode Island constructed in the 1990s; Became the tallest hotel in Providence upon its completion, surpassing the Providence Biltmore
5	Manchester Street Generating Station		321 (98)		1996	Providence 41°48′57″N 71°24′16″W	Power station	The smokestacks of the Manchester Street Generating Station rise to a height of 321 feet
6	Textron Tower		311 (95)	23	1971–72	Providence 41°49′29.63″N 71°24′33.05″W	Office	Built as Old Stone Tower
7	50 Kennedy Plaza		285 (87)	20	1985	Providence 41°49′29.8″N 71°24′38.09″W	Office	Tallest building in Rhode Island constructed in the 1980s
8	Blue Cross & Blue Shield of Rhode Island Headquarters		236 (72)	14	2009	Providence 41°49′40.2672″N 71°24′48.261″W	Office	
9	Waterplace 1		236 (72)	19	2008	Providence 41°49′38.44″N 71°24′45.098″W	Residential	
10	Rhode Island State House	Rhode Island State House 2	223 (68)	4	1904	Providence 41°49′51.1032″N 71°24′54.053″W	Governmental	Was the tallest building in Providence before being surpassed by the Industrial National Bank Building.; Tallest building in Rhode Island constructed in the 1900s
11=	Biltmore Hotel		220 (67)	18	1922	Providence 41°49′27.73″N 71°24′48.4″W	Hotel	Tallest hotel in the city from 1922 until the completion of the Westin Providence in 1993 (Note: The Biltmore Hotel is ranked including the height of the prominent "BILTMORE" sign on the top of the building. Such signs are often included in architectural heights, which is what this particular list ranks. However, some references do not include the sign in the total height of the building. Without the sign, the Biltmore stands at 205 feet (62 m), making it the 13th-tallest in Providence rather than the 10th-tallest.)
11=	The Tower at Carnegie Abbey		220 (67)	17	2009	Portsmouth 41°36′58.3″N 71°16′10.8″W	Residential	Tallest building in Newport County and outside of Providence
12	Providence County Courthouse		217 (66)	7	1930	Providence 41°49′31.76″N 71°24′24.84″W	Governmental	Tallest building in Rhode Island constructed in the 1930s
13	Turk's Head Building		217 (66)	16	1913	Providence 41°49′28.42″N 71°24′35.5″W	Office	Tallest building in Rhode Island constructed in the 1910s
14	Waterplace 2		210 (64)	17	2008	Providence 41°49′38.22″N 71°24′48.05″W	Residential	
15	Pawtucket City Hall		209 (64)	3	1933	Pawtucket 41°52′44.2″N 71°22′55.8″W	Governmental	Tallest building in Pawtucket
16	Grace Church		~206 (63)	1	1860	Providence 41°49′19″N 71°24′49″W	Church	Tallest building in Rhode Island constructed in the 19th century
17=	Carrol Tower		199 (61)	16	1973	Providence 41°49′38.22″N 71°24′48.05″W	Residential	Twin tower of Parenti Villa
17=	Parenti Villa		199 (61)	16	1973	Providence 41°49′11.6″N 71°26′10.0″W	Residential	Twin tower of Carrol Tower.
18	Towers East		194 (59)	16	1976	Pawtucket 41°52′33″N 71°23′09″W	Residential	
19	First Unitarian Church of Providence		189 (58)		1816	Providence 41°49′28″N 71°24′18″W	Church	
20	Charlesgate North		187 (57)	15	1970	Providence 41°50′19.6902″N 71°24′35.2368″W	Residential	
21	First Baptist Church		185 (56)		1775	Providence 41°49′39″N 71°24′30″W	Church	Tallest building in Rhode Island constructed in the 18th century
22	Fogarty Manor		182 (55)		1969	Pawtucket 41°52′50″N 71°22′59″W	Residential	Tallest building in Rhode Island constructed in the 1960s
23=	One Citizens Plaza		180 (55)	13	1990	Providence 41°49′38.4558″N 71°24′38.2926″W	Office	
23=	Brown University Sciences Library		180 (55)	15	1971	Providence 41°49′36.85″N 71°24′0.49″W	University	With its former antenna mast included, the building reached a total height of 395 feet (120 m), more than doubling its effective height and making it the third-tallest building in the city when measuring by pinnacle height.
24	121 South Main Street		178 (54)	11	1984	Providence 41.824074°N 71.407019°W	University	Designed as the corporate headquarters of the Old Stone Bank; Today owned and used by Brown University
25	Hospital Trust Building		177 (54)	13	1920	Providence 41°49′32.38″N 71°24′34.83″W	University	Also known as the Fleet Building; Currently owned by the Rhode Island School of Design and used as a residence hall
26	Sister Dominica Manor		175 (53)	16	1966	Providence 41°49′21.84″N 71°25′16.69″W	Residential	Built as the Bradford House
27	Hilton Providence Hotel		~173 (53)	14	1969	Providence 41°49′23″N 71°25′07″W	Hotel	Built as the Holiday Inn
28	Edge College Hill		172 (52)	15	2018	Providence 41°49′40″N 71°24′36″W	Residential	169 Canal St.; Tallest building in Rhode Island constructed in the 2010s
29	Slater Hill Apartments		170 (52)	14		Pawtucket 41°52′29″N 71°23′10″W	Residential	
30	One Regency Plaza		~161	13	1973		Residential	
31	Bannigan Building		~160 (49)	11	1896	Providence 41°49′29″N 71°24′33″W	Office	
32	Union Trust Company Building		~157 (48)	12	1902	Providence 41°49′25″N 71°24′41″W	Office	
33	Cathedral of Saints Peter and Paul		156 (48)		1889	Providence 41°49′09″N 71°24′59″W	Church	
34	Cornerstone Building		120 (37)	11	1976	Woonsocket 42°00′25″N 71°30′33″W	Office and medical	The building is ADA compliant

== Tallest demolished ==
Name	Height ft (m)	Floors	Built	Destroyed	Location	Use	Notes
Hartford Park		10	1951	1989	Providence	Residential	Residential high rise constructed by the Providence Housing Authority; Original attempt to implode the building failed.

== Timeline of tallest buildings ==
This table lists buildings that once held the title of tallest building in Rhode Island. Since the completion of the First Baptist Church in America, all structures to hold the title have been located in Providence.

Name	Image	Location	Years as tallest	Height ft (m)	Floors	Coordinates	Reference
Trinity Church		Newport	c. 1750–1775	~150 (46)		41.48732°N 71.31328°W	
First Baptist Church		Providence	1775–1816	185 (56)		41°49′39″N 71°24′30″W	
First Unitarian Church of Providence		Providence	1816–1860	189 (58)			
Grace Church		Providence	1860–1904	~206 (63)		41.82208°N 71.41365°W	
Rhode Island State House	Rhode Island State House 2	Providence	1904–1927	223 (68)	4	41°49′51.08″N 71°24′53.87″W	
Industrial National Bank Building		Providence	1927–present	428 (130)	26	41°49′28.27″N 71°24′39.89″W	
