= 50 Kennedy Plaza =

Office in Rhode Island, United States

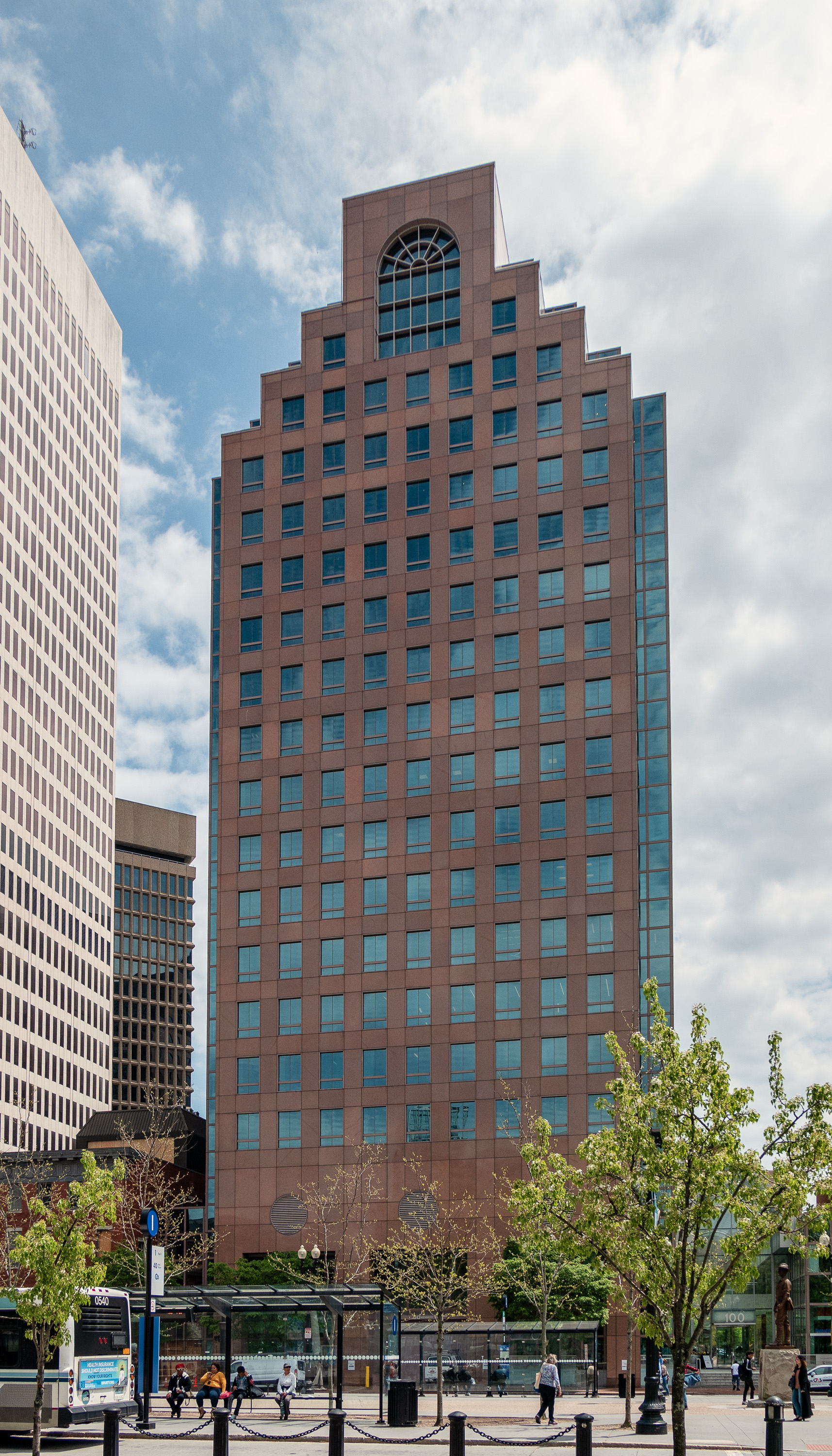

- Location within Rhode Island

General information
- Type: Office
- Location: 50 Kennedy Plaza, Providence, Rhode Island 02891, United States
- Coordinates: 41.8248°N 71.4105°W
- Completed: 1985

Height
- Roof: 285 ft (87 m)

Technical details
- Floor count: 20

Design and construction
- Architect: Hellmuth, Obata & Kassabaum
- Main contractor: Gilbane Building Company

50 Kennedy Plaza (formerly known as Fleet Center) is a postmodern skyscraper in Providence, Rhode Island. At a height of 285 ft (87 m), it is currently the sixth-tallest building in the city and state. The building is named for Kennedy Plaza, which stands to the structure's northeast.

Built by Gilbane Building Company, notable occupants with headquarters in the building include Fortune 1000 company Nortek, Inc. and private equity firm Providence Equity Partners.

The building's exterior façade features in "granite framing green-reflective-glass side elevations". Its location, sandwiched between the 125 m (410 ft) One Financial Center and the 130 m (430 ft) Industrial National Bank Building, ostensibly detracts from its height with architectural historian William Woodward calling it, "a trifle too low for the site." In company of its two neighbors, however, the building forms part of one of the most identifiable parts of the Providence skyline. This section of the Providence skyline is featured on the animated television series Family Guy.

The building is accessible via 100 Westminster St., which has been owned by Paolino Properties since 2014.

== Gallery ==
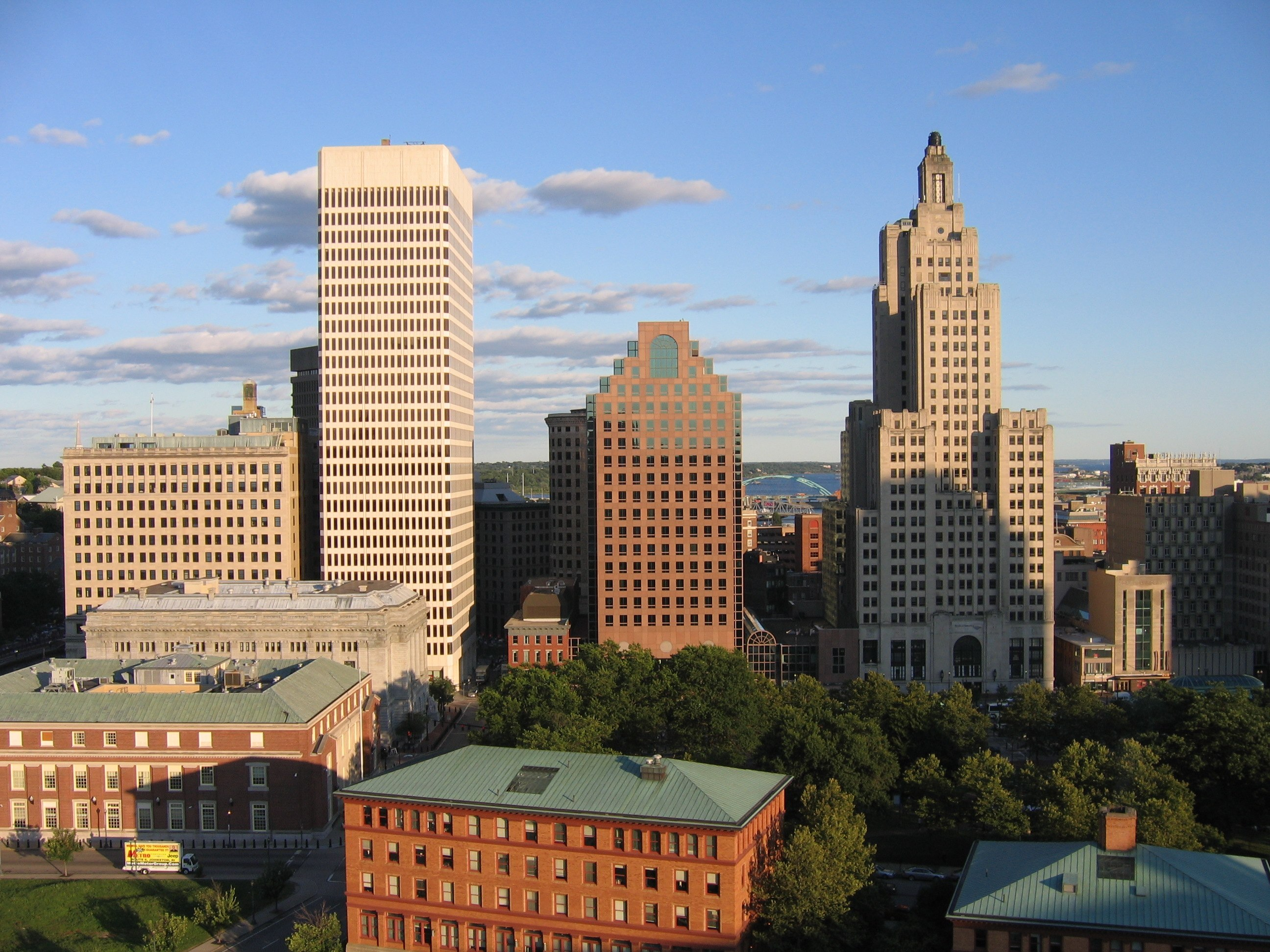
The building stands between One Financial Center (left) and the Industrial National Bank Building (right)

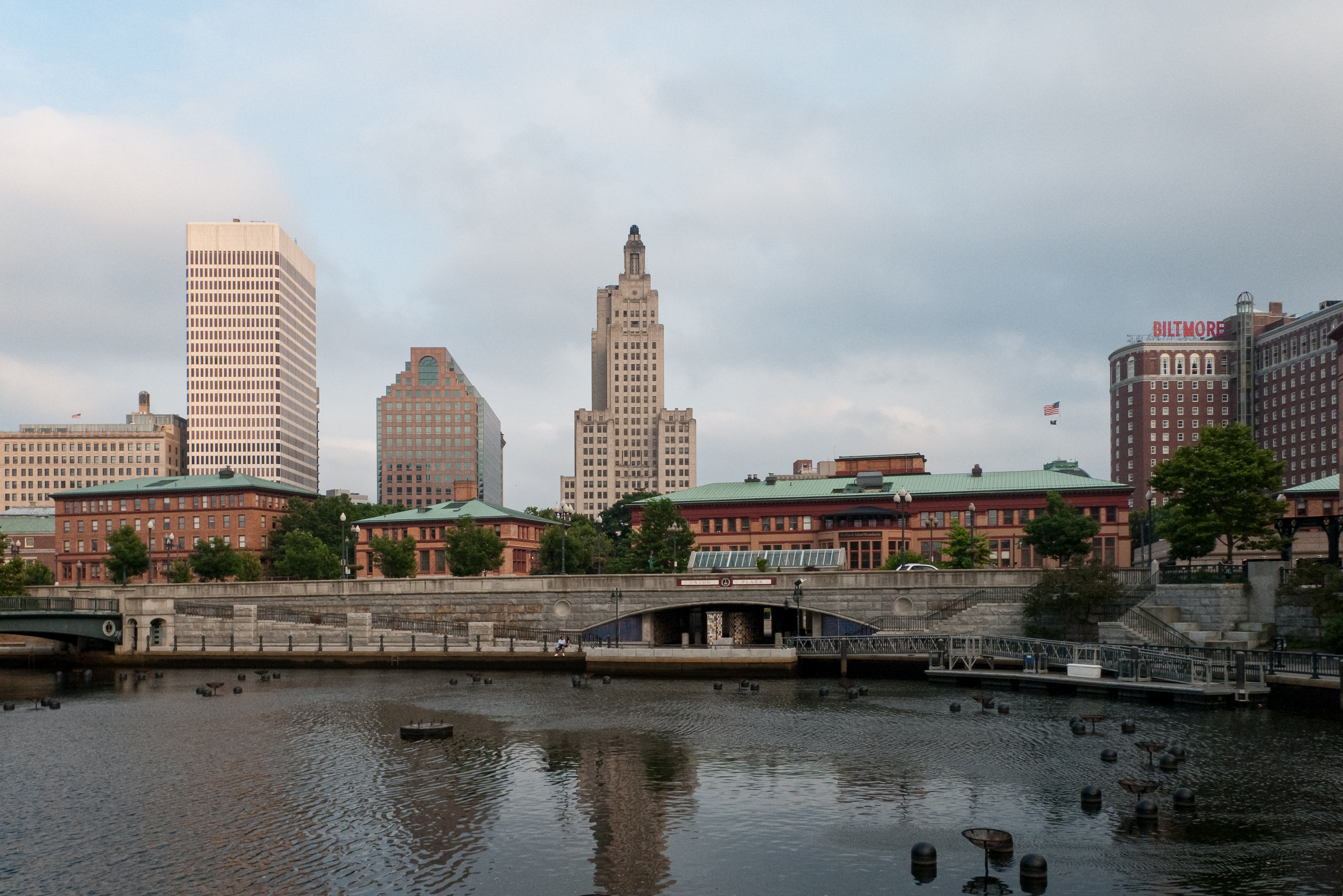
The building (center left) is visible from Waterplace Park
