= One Financial Plaza (Providence) =

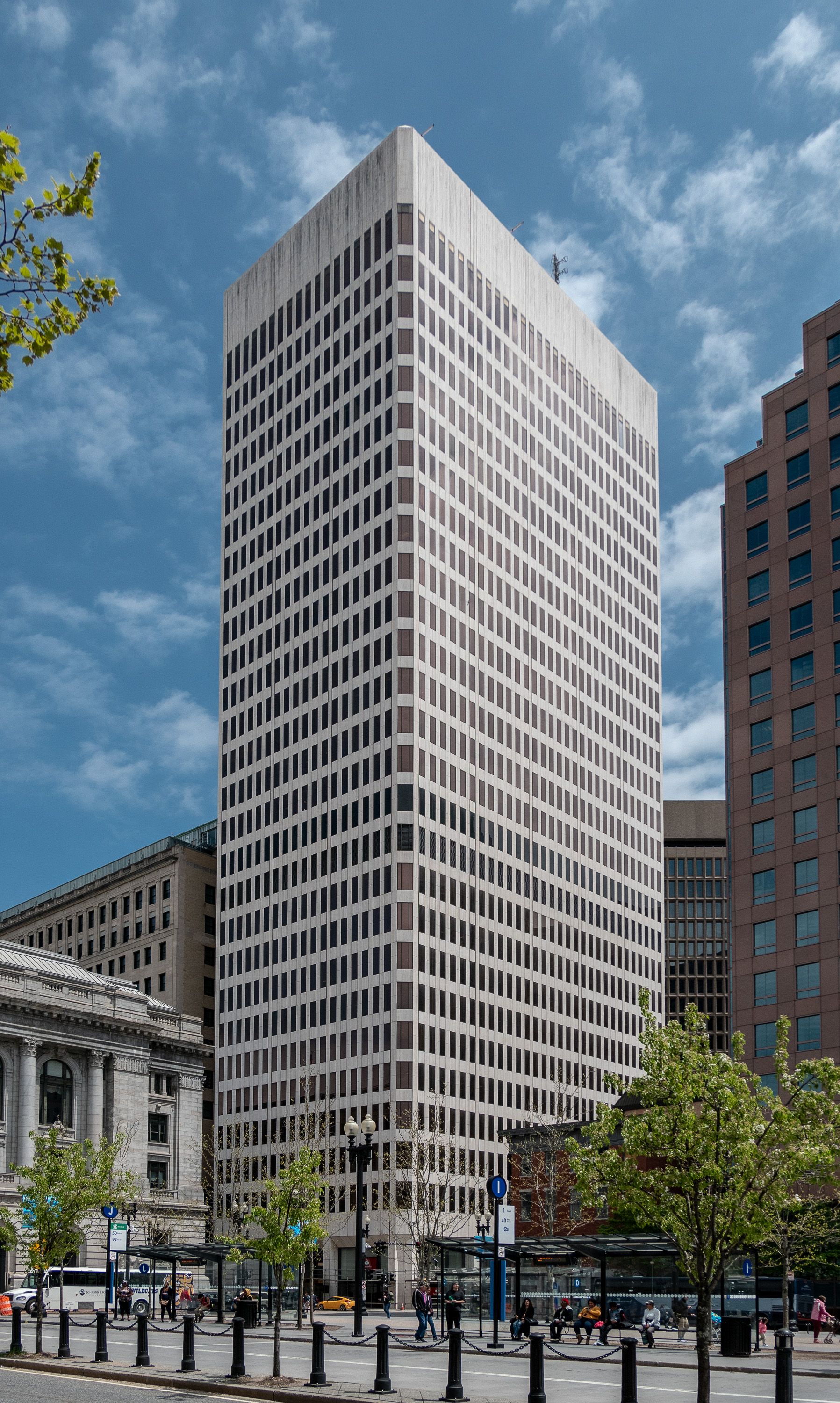

General information
- Type: Office
- Location: One Financial Plaza, Providence, RI 02891, United States
- Coordinates: 41°49′31.11″N 71°24′36.14″W
- Construction started: 1970
- Completed: 1973

Height
- Roof: 413 ft (126 m)

Technical details
- Floor count: 28

Design and construction
- Architects: John Carl Warnecke & Associates
- Developer: Hospital Trust Corporation

One Financial Plaza, also known as the Sovereign Bank Tower and formerly known as the Hospital Trust Tower, is an international-style skyscraper that stands along Kennedy Plaza in Downtown Providence, Rhode Island. The building is the second-tallest in the city and state, surpassed in height only by the Industrial National Bank Building.

== Architecture ==
Designed by John Carl Warnecke & Associates, One Financial Plaza takes the form of a rectangular prism with beveled vertical edges. The facade is clad in pre-cast concrete and travertine. The structure is topped with a wide masonry cap surrounded by lights that glow white at night; the light colors are changed to green and red for the Christmas holiday season, red for Valentine's Day and Saint Joseph's Day, and green for Saint Patrick's Day. Atop the building's roof is the highest helicopter pad in the state of Rhode Island.

The Hospital Trust Tower was built to house the institution responsible for funding Rhode Island Hospital and stands adjacent to the original Rhode Island Hospital Trust Building.

William McKenzie Woodward, a well-known architectural historian and staff member of the Rhode Island Historical Preservation & Heritage Commission, does not agree aesthetically with the building, calling it a "lackluster addition to both the street and the skyline" saying that its "blunt mass" is made "more graceless" by its travertine curtain wall even though it is part of the Big 3, the most recognizable part of the Providence skyline that is also often seen in the television series Family Guy.

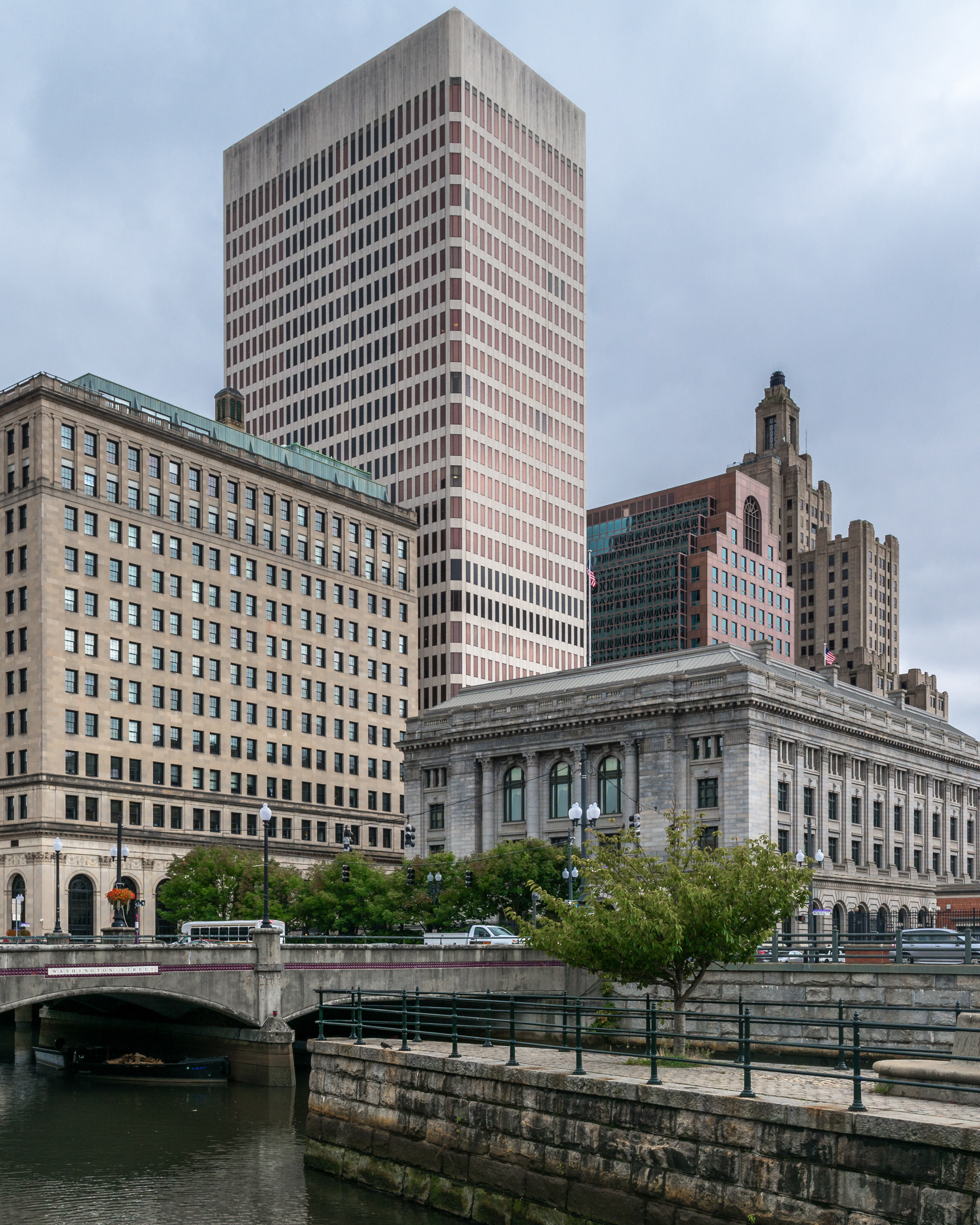
The building as viewed from across the Providence River

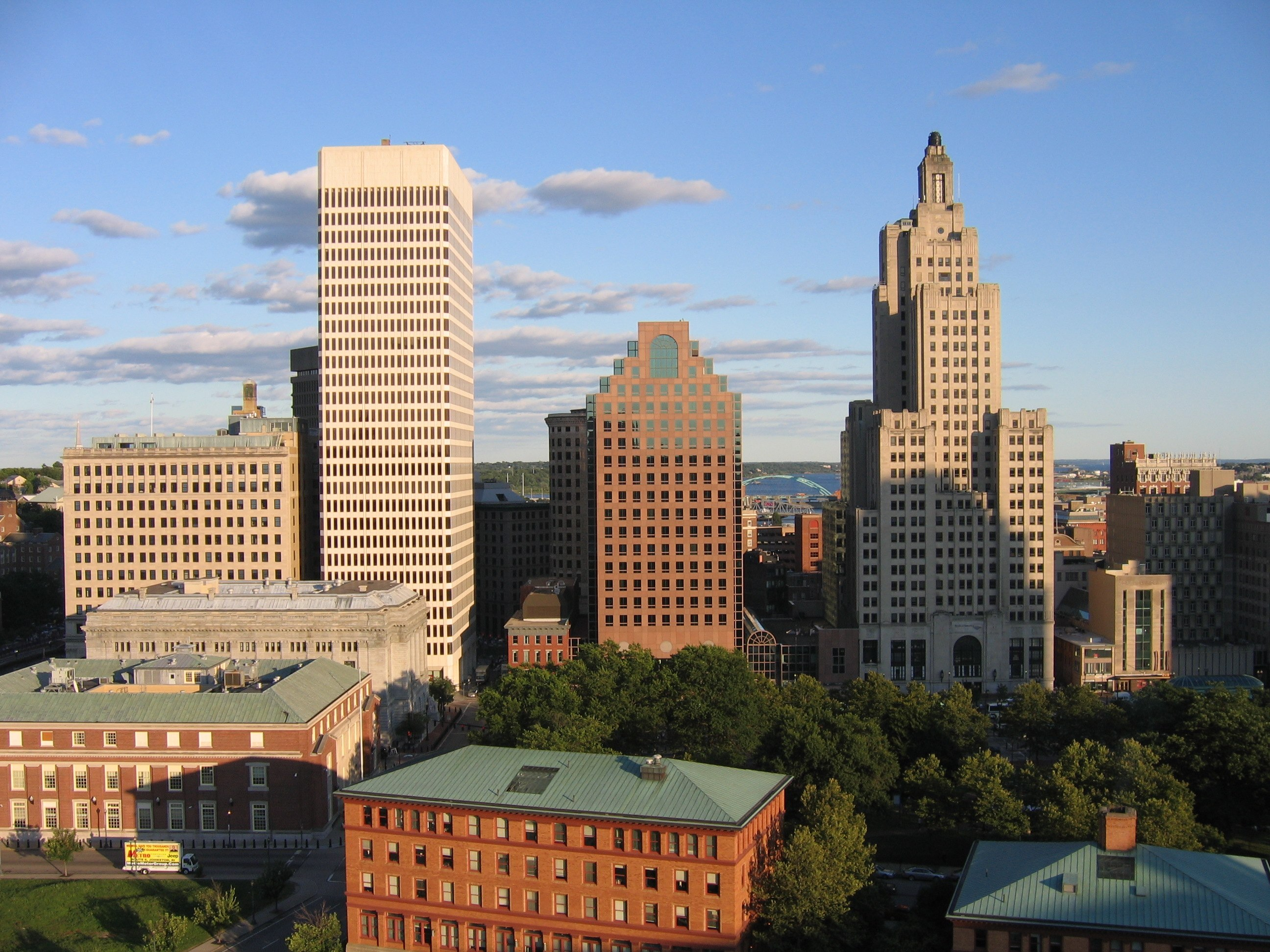
The structure features prominently in the Providence skyline

The building (2nd from left) alongside other Providence structures
