= Rhode Island Hospital Trust Building =

Historic place in Providence, Rhode Island

- U.S. National Register of Historic Places
- U.S. Historic district – Contributing property
- Roger Mandle Building
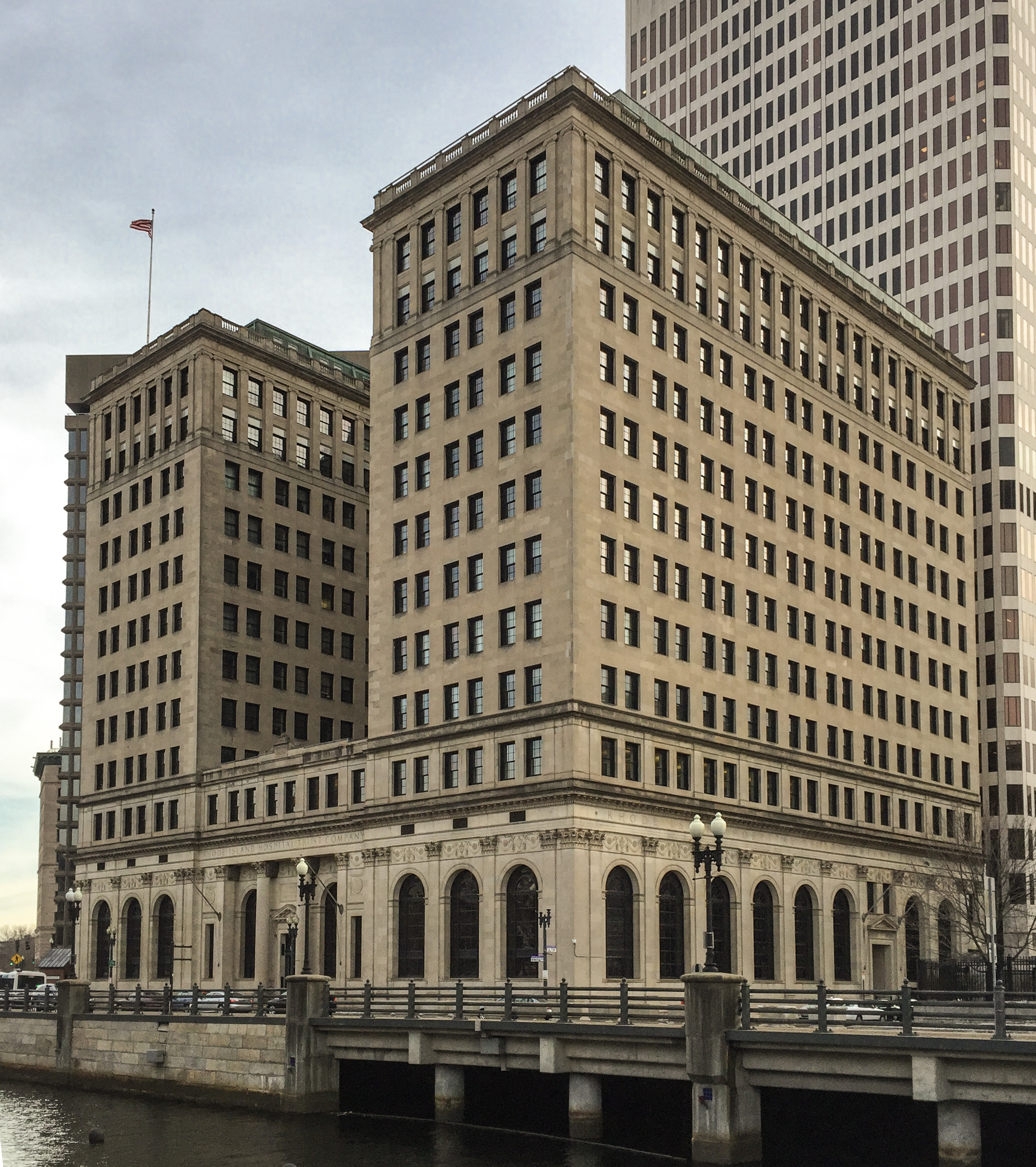

- Location within Rhode Island Location within the United States
- Location: 15 Westminster Street, Providence, Rhode Island
- Coordinates: 41°49′31″N 71°24′37″W
- Built: 1920
- Architect: York & Sawyer
- Architectural style: Renaissance Revival
- Part of: Downtown Providence Historic District (ID84001967)
- NRHP reference No.: 76000002

Significant dates
- Added to NRHP: October 22, 1976
- Designated CP: February 10, 1984

The Rhode Island Hospital Trust Building is a historic commercial building in downtown Providence, Rhode Island, United States, designed by York & Sawyer and completed in 1920. The bank vault was designed by Frederick S. Holmes. Since 2006 the building has housed dormitories and the Fleet Library of the Rhode Island School of Design.

== History and description ==
The Rhode Island Hospital Trust Company was a banking institution founded in 1867 to manage the financial affairs of Rhode Island Hospital, founded in 1863. It was the first trust company to be organized in New England. As originally constituted, the bank paid a certain percentage of its profits to the hospital; this ended in 1880 once the hospital found other means of fundraising. The bank's original building on this site was a Richardsonian Romanesque building designed by Anglo-American architect Robert W. Gibson and completed in 1891. It was expanded in 1903 from designs by Peabody & Stearns, who matched the original style with the addition of a fifth floor and a more elaborate entrance.

Over the next decade the bank grew to be the largest in Rhode Island and outgrew its building. Plans were made for a replacement in 1916 and construction began in 1917; the latter date is inscribed on the building in several locations. It was designed by York & Sawyer and built by the George A. Fuller Company, both of New York City. Wartime restrictions on the civilian use of construction materials meant that construction was delayed during World War I. It was built in two phases: a first, completed in 1919, which was built around the original building, and a second, completed in 1920, which replaced that building. It was designed in the form of Renaissance palazzo, stretched eleven stories high. The Providence Magazine described it as "a modern adaptation of the English conception of the Italian Renaissance." The focus of the interior is the former banking hall, which occupies most of the ground floor. Like the exterior it was designed in the Renaissance style and has a vaulted ceiling supported by twenty-four Corinthian columns. The building is steel-framed and is faced with marble on the two lower levels and with limestone elsewhere.

In 1927 an addition was completed on the southwestern side of the building, comprising the section beyond the Westminster and Fulton Street entrances. It was designed by the original architects, York & Sawyer, to match their original building

== Later history ==
In 1933 the bank formed a national bank, the Rhode Island Hospital National Bank, to take over its commercial business. The new bank, opened in the building in 1934, was organized in reaction to the directors' fears of bank nationalization after the banking panic and the Emergency Banking Act of 1933. The national bank was merged back into the trust company in 1951 and in 1969 the trust company was reorganized as a new national bank, the Rhode Island Hospital Trust National Bank. In 1973 it completed the adjacent One Financial Plaza and occupied both buildings. The bank acquired a dozen Rhode Island banks over the twentieth century and in 1985 was itself acquired by the Bank of Boston. The Bank of Boston, renamed BankBoston in 1996, continued to use the Hospital Trust name until 1998, a year before it merged with Fleet Financial Group to form FleetBoston Financial. Fleet was the successor to the Industrial Trust Company, later the Industrial National Bank, Hospital Trust's largest local competitor.

In 2002 FleetBoston donated the former banking hall to the Rhode Island School of Design (RISD), for use as a library, and in 2003 both of the bank's buildings were sold to Gilbane. Gilbane redeveloped the older building into student housing for RISD and sold it to the school in 2005 for $47 million. In 2006 the Fleet Library, named in recognition of the donation, opened. The architect of the conversion was Nader Tehrani, a RISD alumnus. In 2007 the building was rechristened the Roger Mandle Building after a former president of the University. It currently houses RISD's Fleet Library, Portfolio Cafe and several floors of dormitory space.

The building was listed on the National Register of Historic Places in 1976.

== Gallery ==
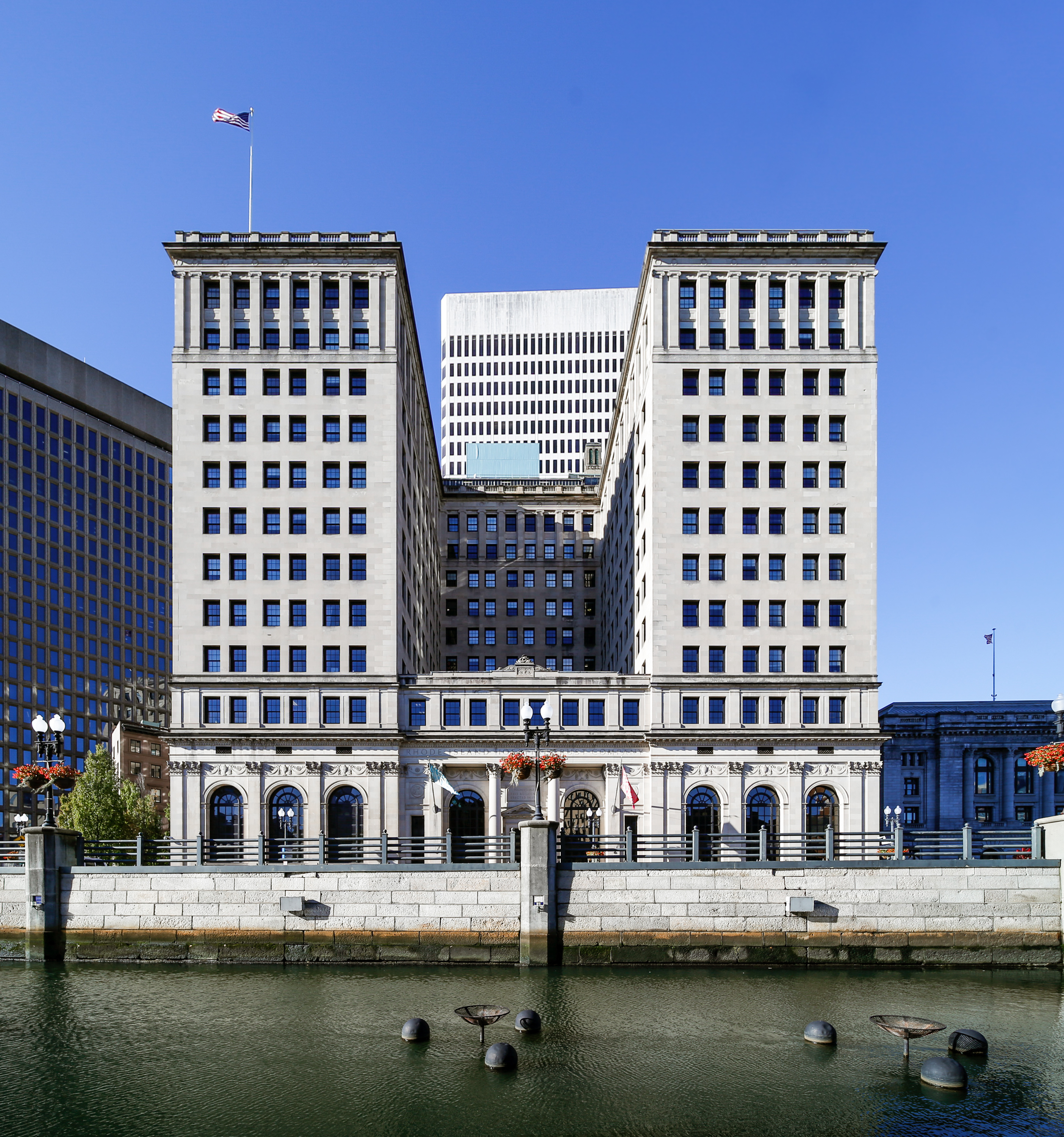

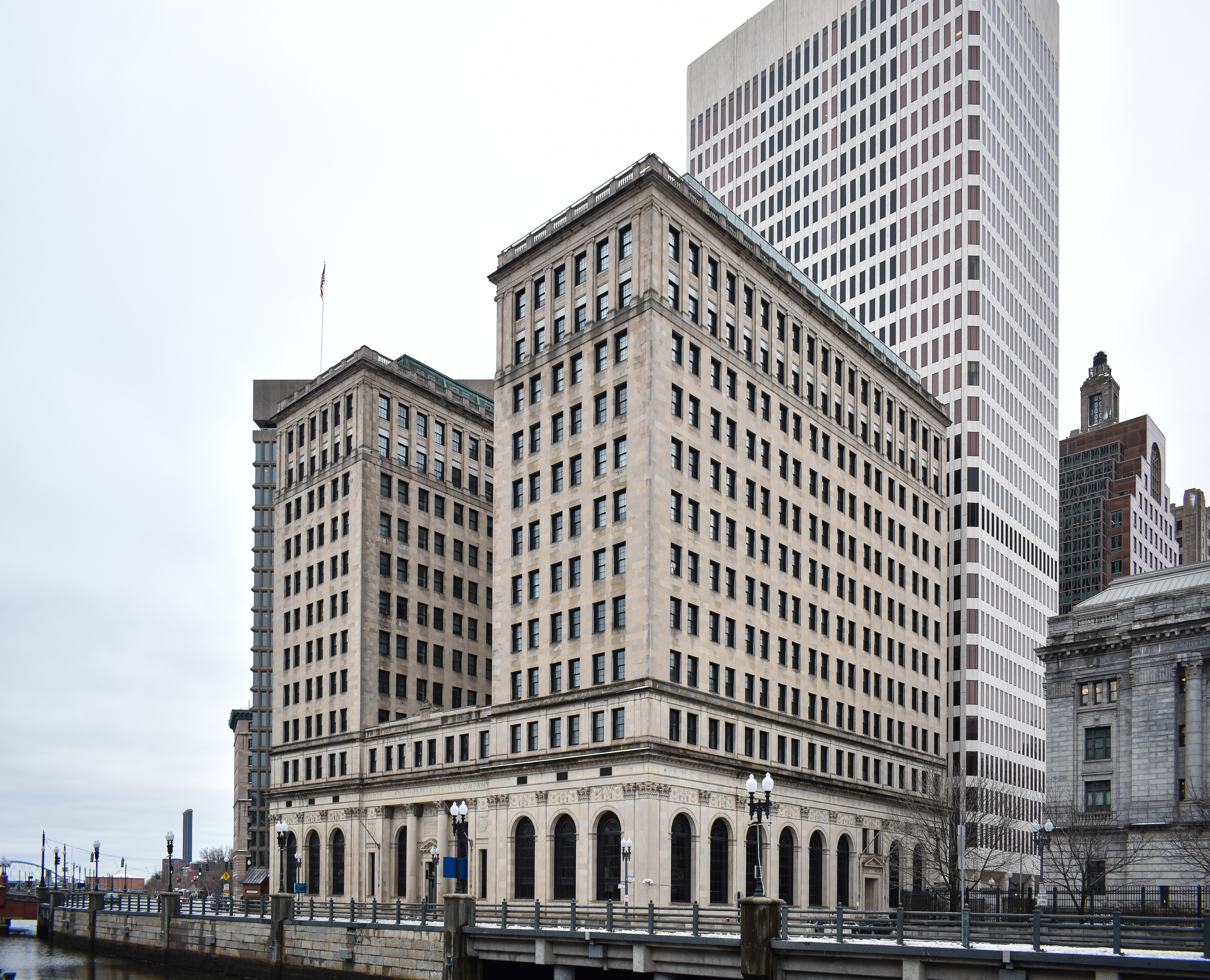

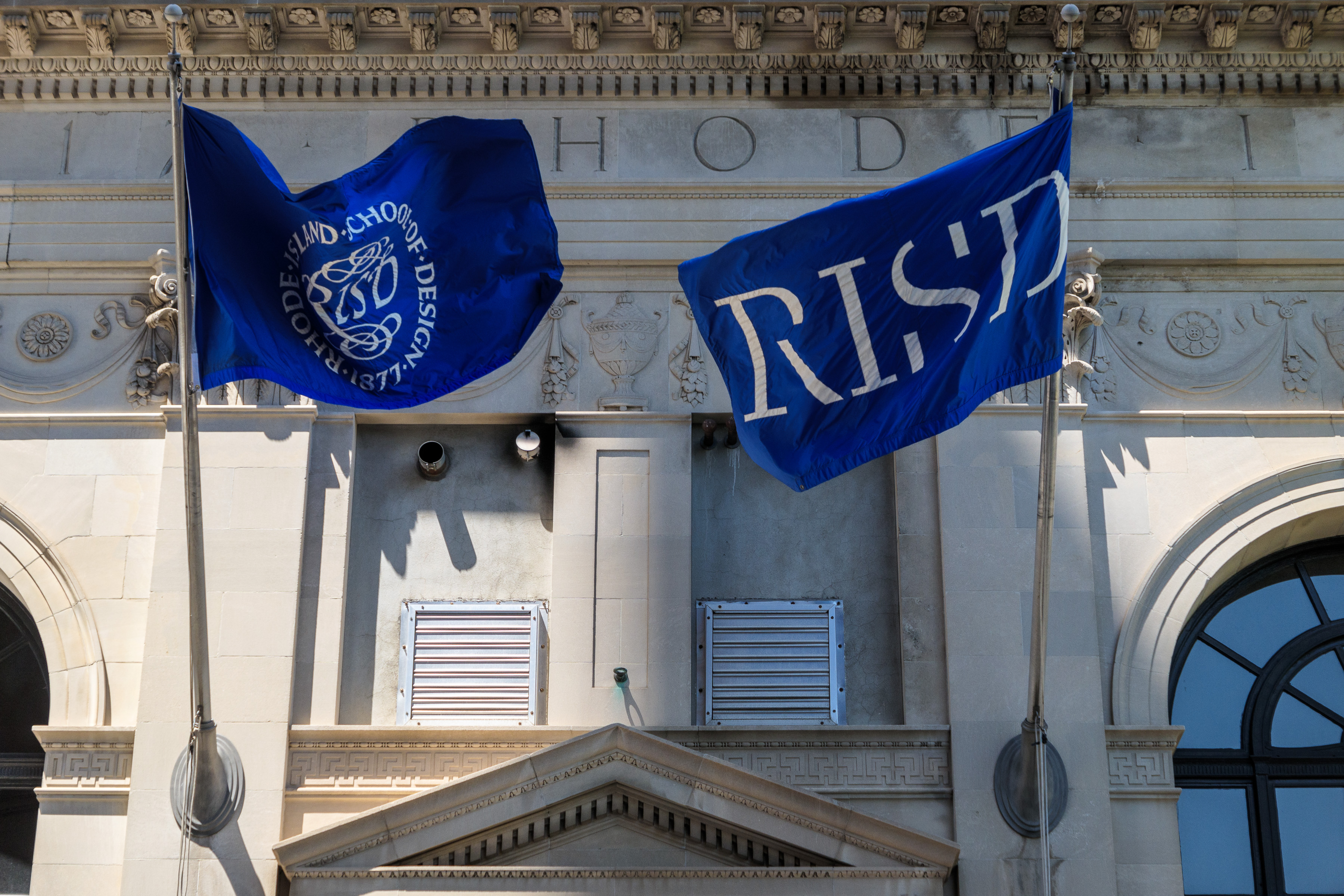
RISD purchased the building in 2005

== See also ==
- National Register of Historic Places listings in Providence, Rhode Island
