= Providence Biltmore =

Graduate by Hilton Providence
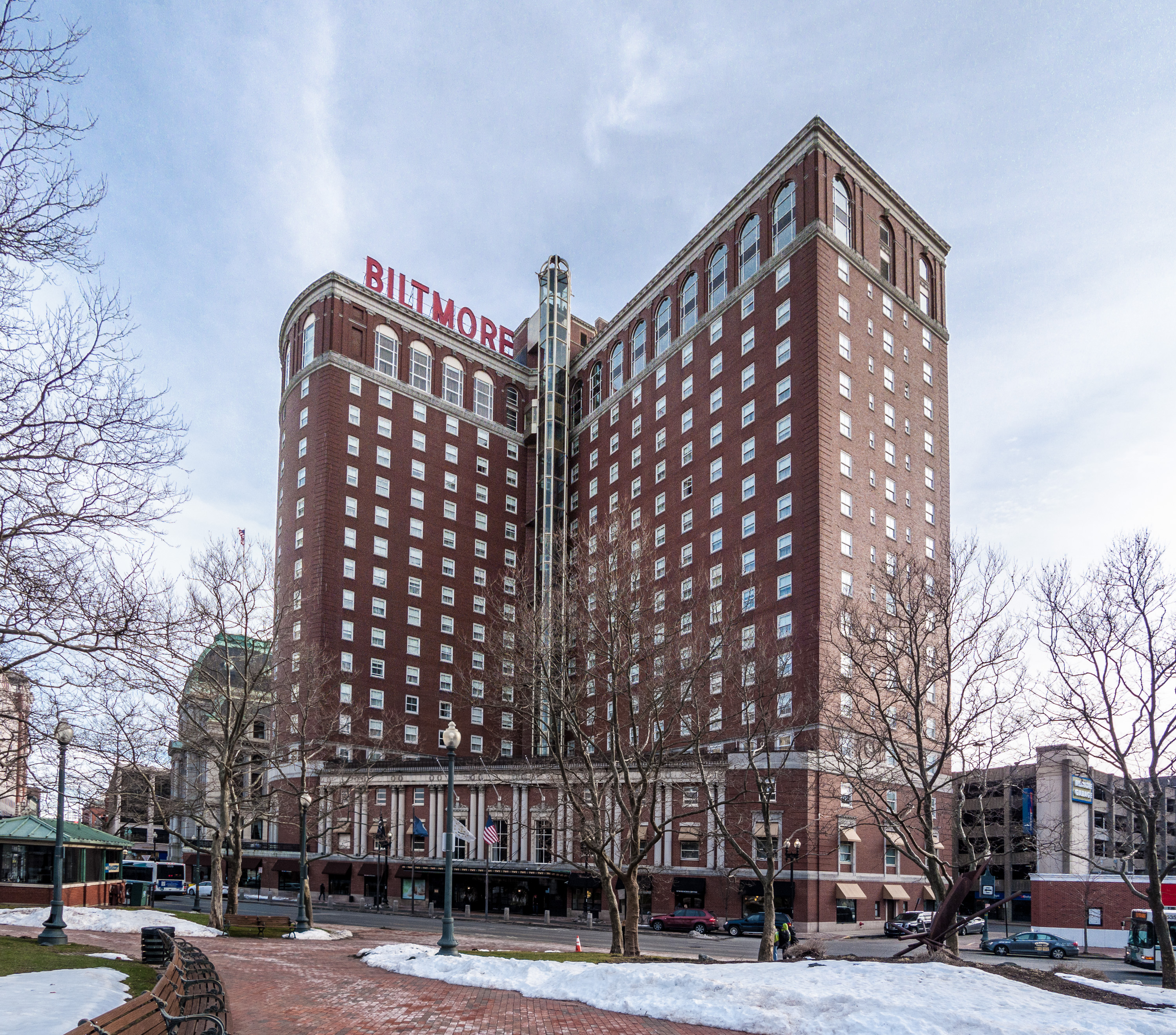
- Graduate Providence, seen in 2017

General information
- Type: Hotel
- Location: 11 Dorrance Street, Providence, Rhode Island 02903, United States
- Completed: June 6, 1922

Height
- Roof: 220 ft (67 m)

Technical details
- Floor count: 18

Design and construction
- Architect: Warren & Wetmore

Other information
- Number of rooms: 294
- Providence-Biltmore Hotel
- U.S. National Register of Historic Places
- U.S. Historic district – Contributing property
- Location within Rhode Island Location within the United States
- Location: Providence, Rhode Island
- Coordinates: 41°49′27″N 71°24′49″W
- Built: 1922
- Architect: Warren & Wetmore
- Architectural style: Federal, Beaux Arts
- Part of: Downtown Providence Historic District (ID84001967)
- NRHP reference No.: 77000005

Significant dates
- Added to NRHP: May 27, 1977
- Designated CP: February 10, 1984

The Graduate by Hilton Providence is an upscale hotel that opened in 1922 as the Providence Biltmore Hotel, part of the Bowman-Biltmore Hotels chain. It is located on the southern corner of Kennedy Plaza at 11 Dorrance Street in downtown Providence, Rhode Island. It was added to the National Register of Historic Places in 1977 and is a member of Historic Hotels of America, the official program of the National Trust for Historic Preservation.

== History ==
=== Early history ===
The Providence Biltmore was conceived by the Providence Chamber of Commerce and funded through a public campaign in which 1,800 citizens contributed to pay for the construction costs. The management contract for the hotel was awarded to the Bowman-Biltmore Hotels chain, founded by John McEntee Bowman and Louis Wallick. The hotel was built in the neo-Federal Beaux-arts style and designed by the architectural firm of Warren and Wetmore, who also designed Grand Central Terminal. The hotel opened to much fanfare on June 6, 1922, and was the second-tallest building in the city after the Rhode Island State House, until the Industrial Trust Tower was finished six years later. Today, the Biltmore is the 9th-tallest building in the city.

The Biltmore was the city's only luxury hotel and welcomed many famous (and infamous) guests over the course of the 20th century. Mobsters, bootleggers, celebrities and politicians frequented the hotel and its many restaurants and bars. The hotel was the backdrop for many Rhode Island political and social scandals over the years, many of which are documented in the book Meet Me at the Biltmore.

The Biltmore welcomed both black and white guests during a time when racial discrimination in public accommodations was common. Starting in 1941, the hotel paid for a listing in The Negro Motorist Green Book, a travel guide for Black travelers.

=== Middle years and decline ===
The Biltmore was bought by Sheraton Hotels in 1947 and renamed the Sheraton-Biltmore Hotel. Providence was flooded by Hurricane Carol in 1954, leaving much of the hotel's lobby underwater; a plaque commemorates the high water mark today, eight feet up on the lobby columns. Sheraton sold the hotel, along with seventeen other aging properties, to Gotham Hotels in 1968 and it became the Biltmore Hotel & Motor Inn. In 1975, amidst a flurry of lawsuits over tens of thousands of dollars of unpaid utility bills and back taxes, Gotham Hotels was forced to close the Biltmore. It remained vacant for four years.

=== Restoration ===
With the hotel facing demolition; Mayor Buddy Cianci helped with efforts to designate the hotel a landmark. A group of local businessmen, including Bruce Sundlun of the Outlet Company, Michael Metcalf of The Providence Journal, G. William Miller of Textron, and Jim Winoker and Dominic Zinni of B.B. Greenberg Company, purchased the hotel. They used Federal tax credits to restore the hotel, reopening it in February 1979 as The Biltmore Plaza, operated by Boston hospitality management firm Hotels of Distinction. The Biltmore's external glass elevator was added during this renovation, and served all 18 floors of the hotel (though it no longer runs). In 1983, the owners retained Dunfey Hotels to manage the hotel, which was renamed Biltmore Plaza, A Dunfey Hotel. Soon after, Dunfey was reorganized as Omni Hotels, and the hotel was renamed the Omni Biltmore Hotel. By the 1990s, the Omni Biltmore was fully owned by The Providence Journal. They sold the hotel to the Grand Heritage Hotels chain in July 1995, for $7 million, and it was renamed the Providence Biltmore. The hotel was sold out of receivership on May 31, 2012, to Finard Coventry Hotel Management, for $16 million. Finard Coventry invested a further $10 million in renovations, and the hotel joined Curio, A Collection by Hilton, on December 16, 2014.

=== Graduate Providence ===
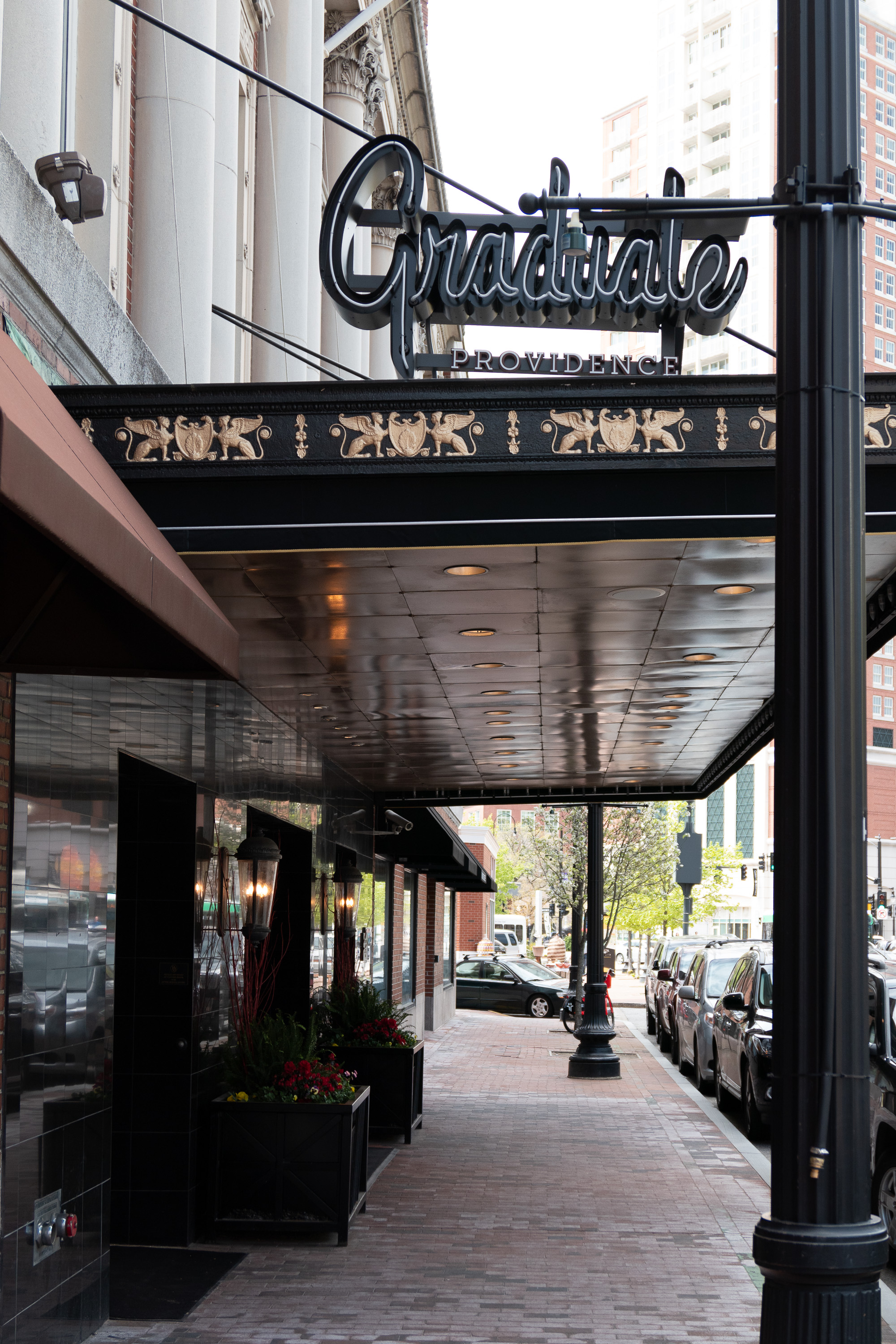
A small sign above the awning announces the new name.

In October 2017, the Biltmore was sold to AJ Capital Partners, a Chicago-based hotel and real estate firm, for $43.6 million. The hotel was renovated and renamed Graduate Providence on April 2, 2019, as part of AJ Capital's Graduate Hotels boutique chain, located in college towns across the United States. The new owners retained the hotel's iconic neon "Biltmore" sign. Hilton Worldwide bought the Graduate Hotels brand in May 2024, and operates the hotel as Graduate by Hilton Providence. However, the Graduate Hotels structures are still owned by AJ Capital Partners.

== Description ==
The hotel was originally built with 600 rooms; later, walls were knocked down and suites were created. It now offers 292 guest rooms.

The hotel contains banquet space of over 19,000 square feet (1,800 m^{2}). The rooftop level Grand Ballroom offers expansive views of the city and Kennedy Plaza and can hold up to 750 guests; its event space is designed for functions such as wedding receptions, banquet service, and conferences.

It was the tallest and largest hotel in Providence for 71 years, until The Westin Providence (today known as the Omni Providence Hotel) was completed in 1993. The hotel was home to the largest Starbucks in New England from 2003 to 2019.

== In popular culture ==
=== Cinema backdrop ===
The Providence Biltmore features prominently in the 2004 Jeff Nathanson film The Last Shot, and the 2007 Anne Fletcher film 27 Dresses.

Showtime episodes of Brotherhood from 2004 to 2007 were also shot here.

=== Literature ===
In 2022, author Amanda Quay Blount published Meet Me At The Biltmore, a book chronicling the hotel's storied past alongside Providence's highs and lows throughout the 20th century.

The hotel is the scene of a Brown University collegiate reunion in The Devil Wears Prada by Lauren Weisberger. It is also mentioned a number of times in Jeffrey Eugenides' book The Marriage Plot, which takes place at Brown in 1982.

=== Television ===
The Providence Hotel is shown as a scene in NOS4A2, The Hourglass (S2, E6), series on AMC. Air Date: July 26, 2020.

== Gallery ==
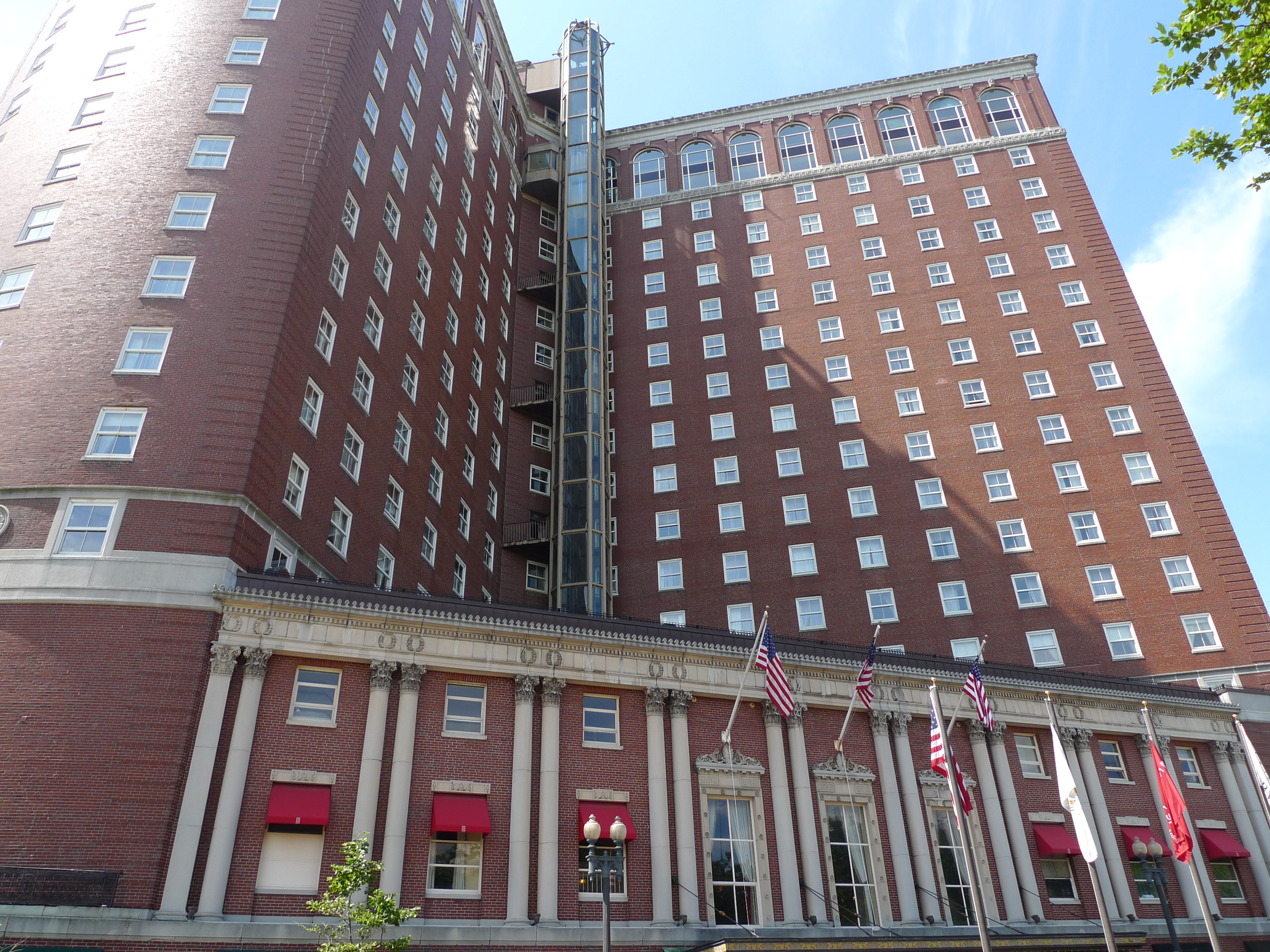
Biltmore exterior in 2009

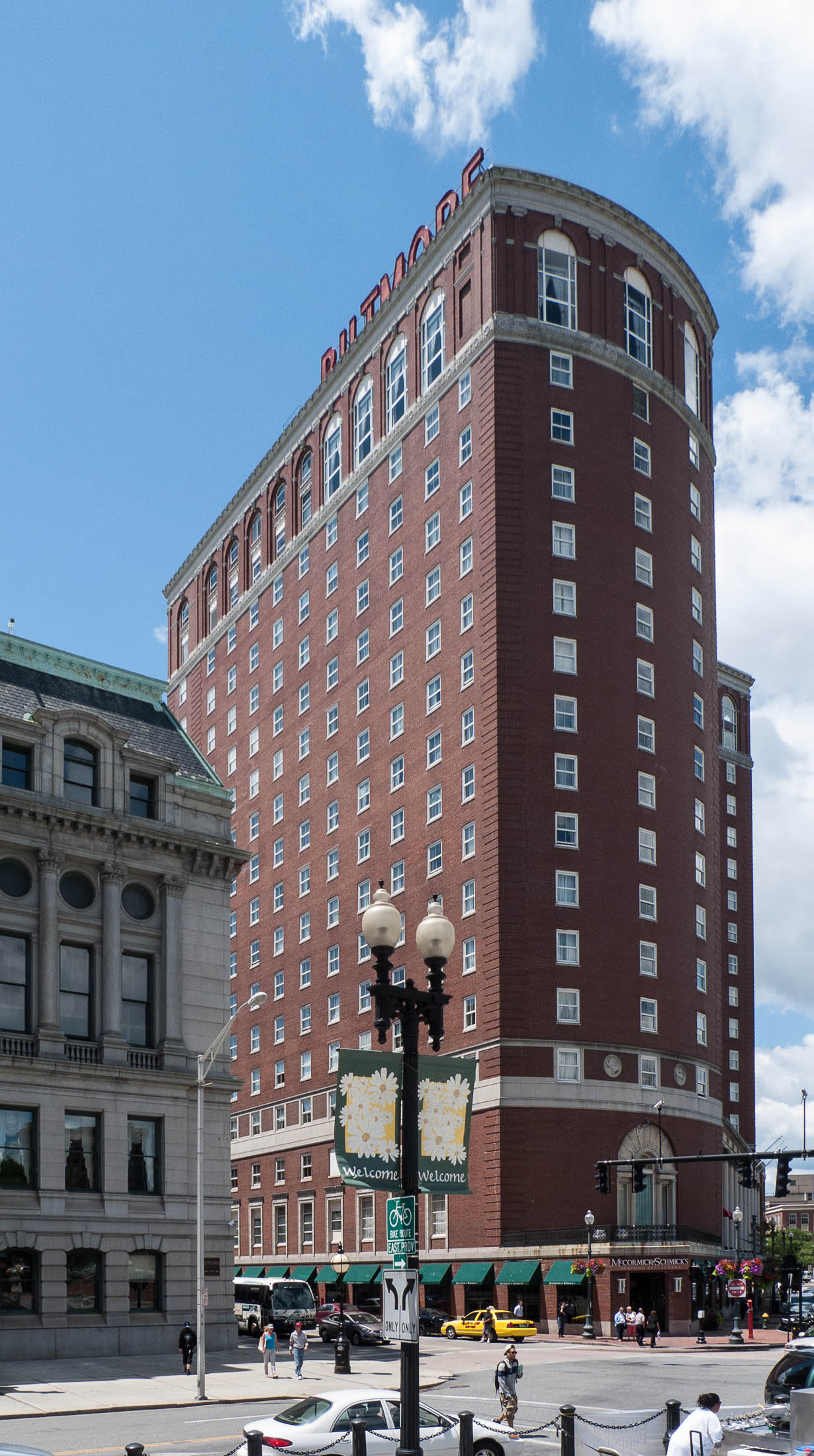
Providence Biltmore Hotel corner view in 2011

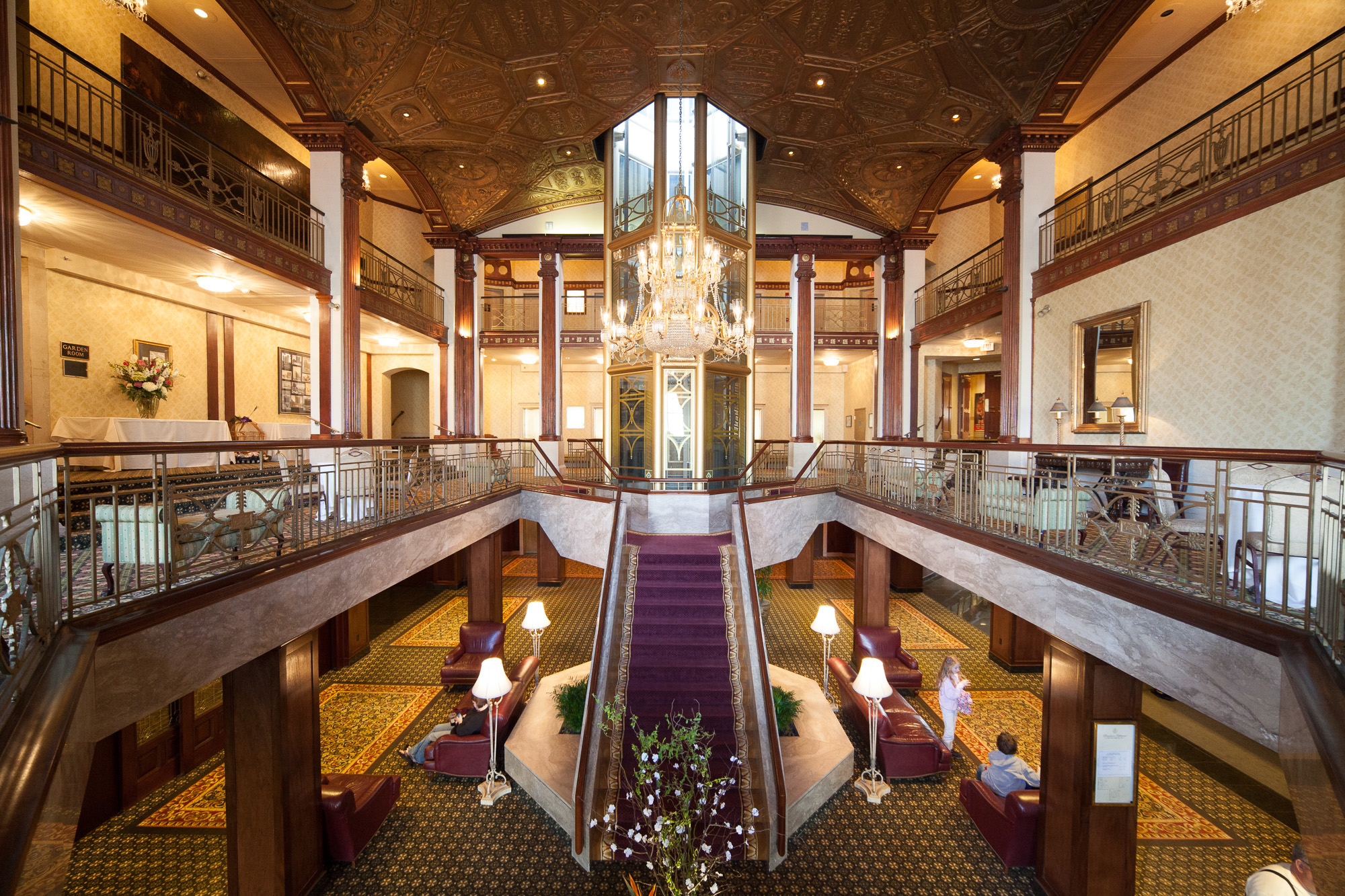
Biltmore lobby in 2012

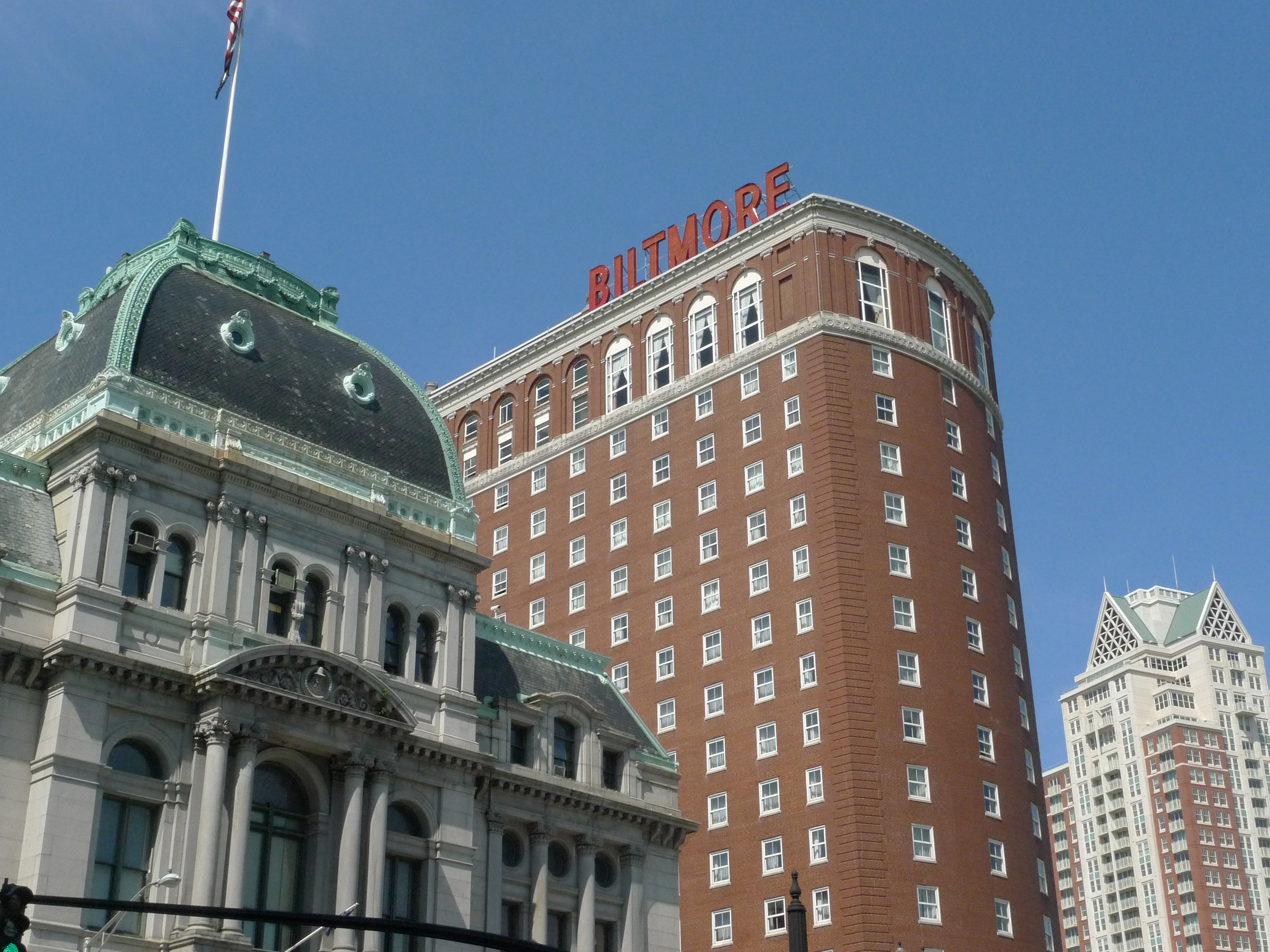
City Hall, Biltmore, and Westin

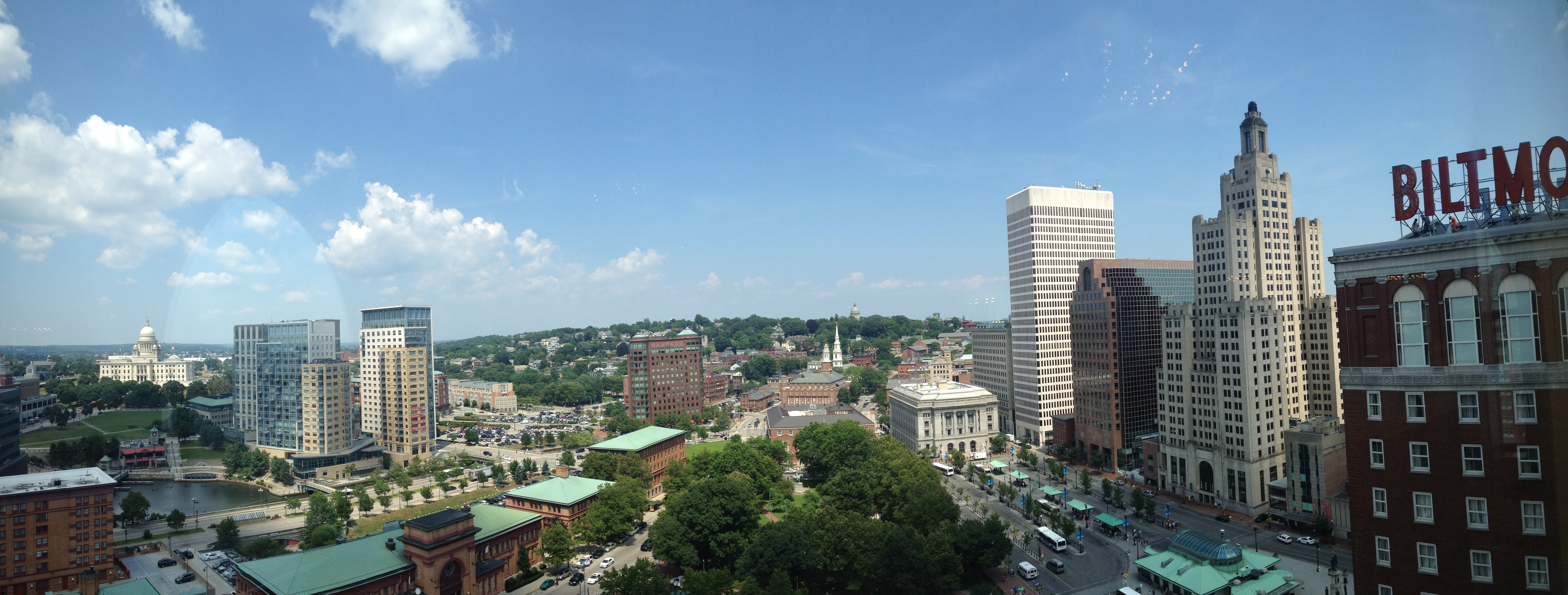
Panoramic view from top floor

== See also ==
- National Register of Historic Places listings in Providence, Rhode Island
