= Waterplace Towers =

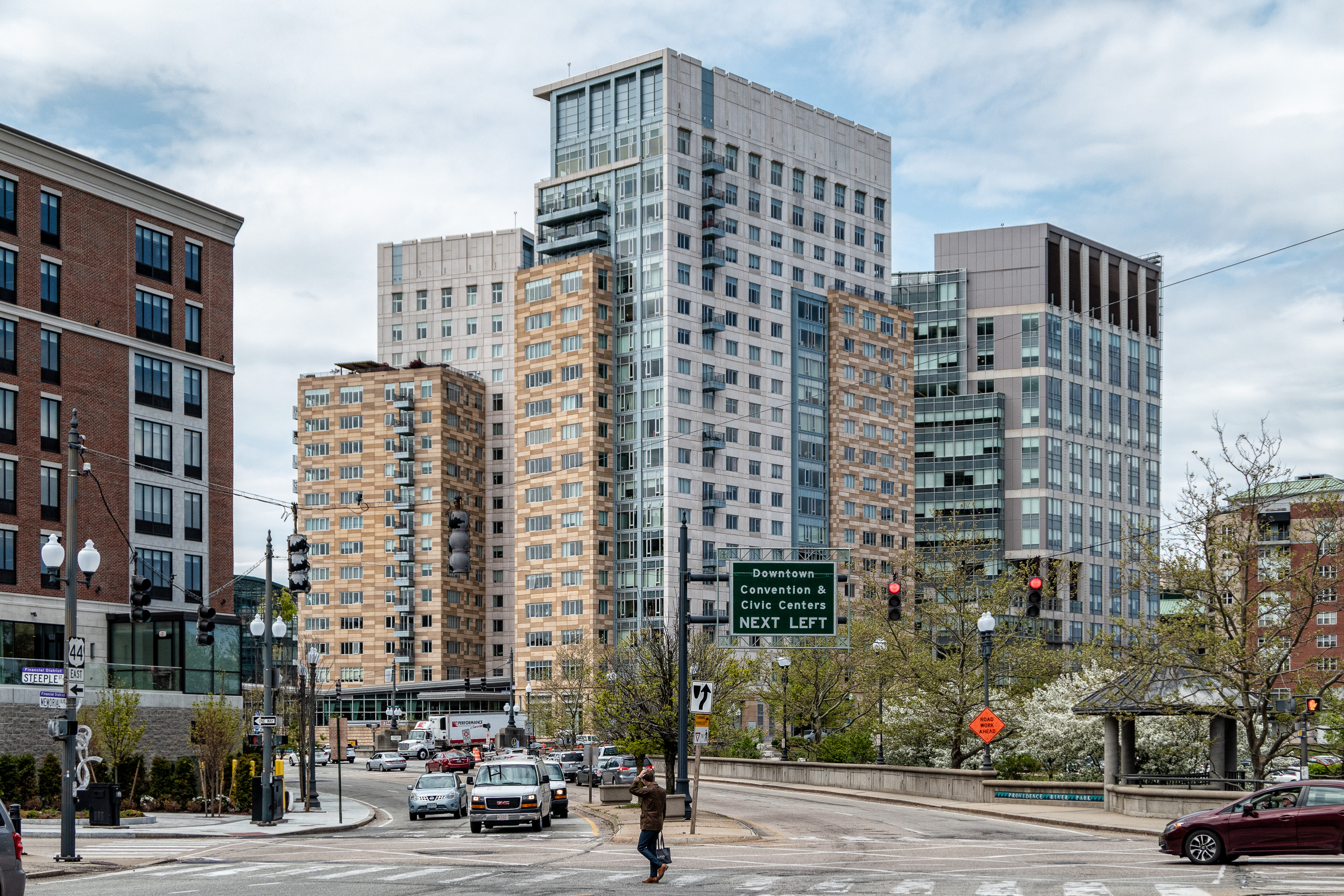
- Waterplace Towers 2 and 1 (left and center), and Blue Cross Headquarters (right), seen from downtown Providence.
- Interactive map of the Waterplace Towers area

General information
- Type: Residential, Restaurant
- Location: Waterplace Park, Providence 02903, RI, United States
- Coordinates: 41°49′38.36″N 71°24′45.91″W
- Construction started: 2006
- Completed: 2009

Height
- Roof: 235 ft (72 m); 213 ft (65 m)

Technical details
- Floor count: 19; 17

Design and construction
- Architect: ADD Inc.
- Developer: InterContinental Real Estate Corporation

Waterplace Towers is the name of a high-rise residential condominium project in Providence, Rhode Island. The project completed construction in Early 2009, and was developed by Intercontinental Real Estate Corporation.

The two towers, which are 235 feet (72 m) and 213 ft (65 m) high, contain 193 luxury condominiums. The price range for units in the $100 million complex start at $300,000 and top out at "more than $1 million." Waterplace is named for its location, abutting the Waterplace Park, which hosts Providence's popular WaterFire events. Private balconies and/or window views of Waterfire are expected to be a major selling point for the complex. Underground parking patrolled hourly. Waterplace was one of two luxury high-rise condominium complexes in downtown Providence completed in the late 2000s, the other being The Residences Providence.

The buildings are officially the 7th and 12th-tallest buildings in Providence. The towers finished construction in mid-2008.

== Gallery ==
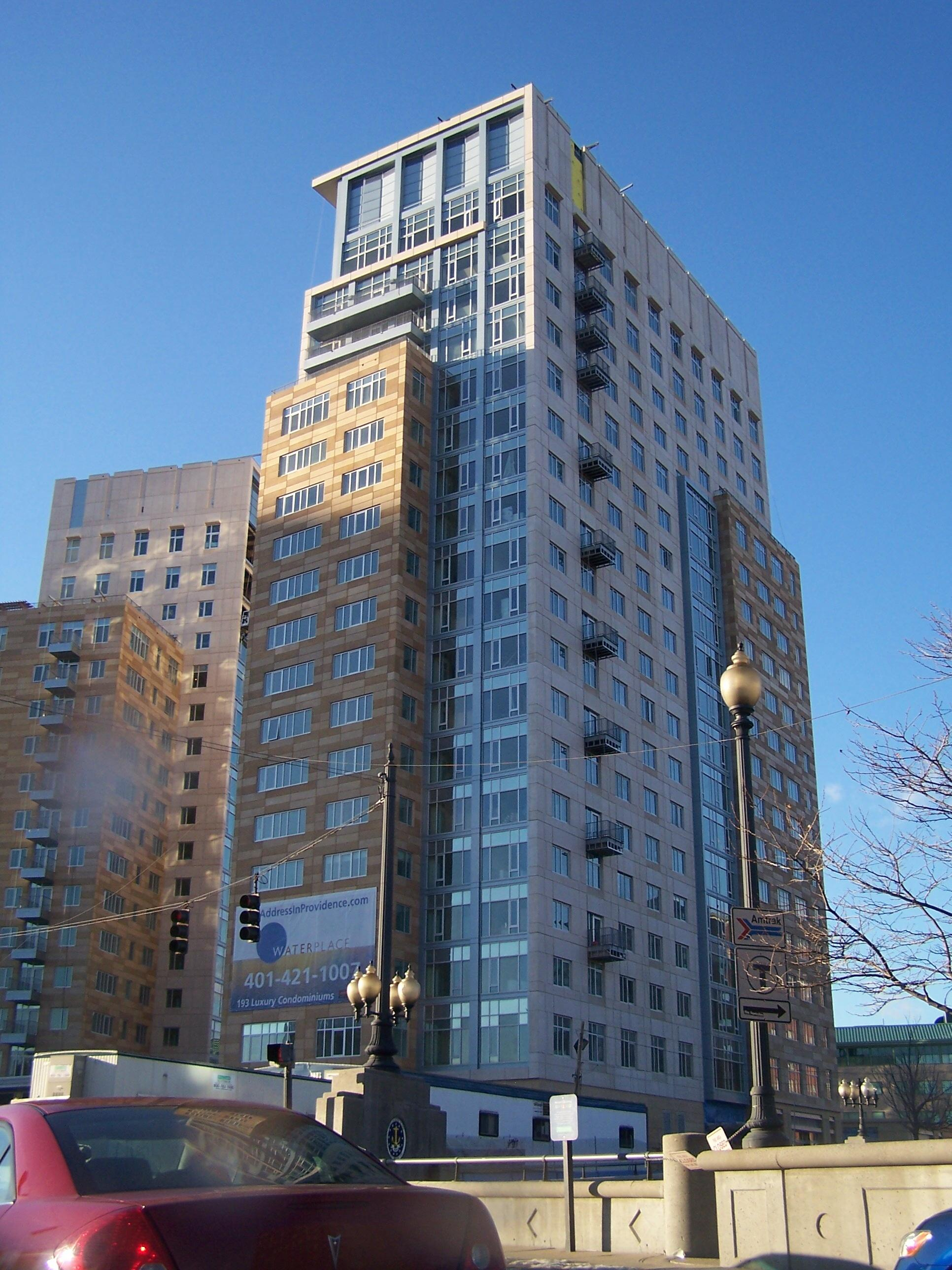
Waterplace I nearing completion in December 2007, with Waterplace II to the left

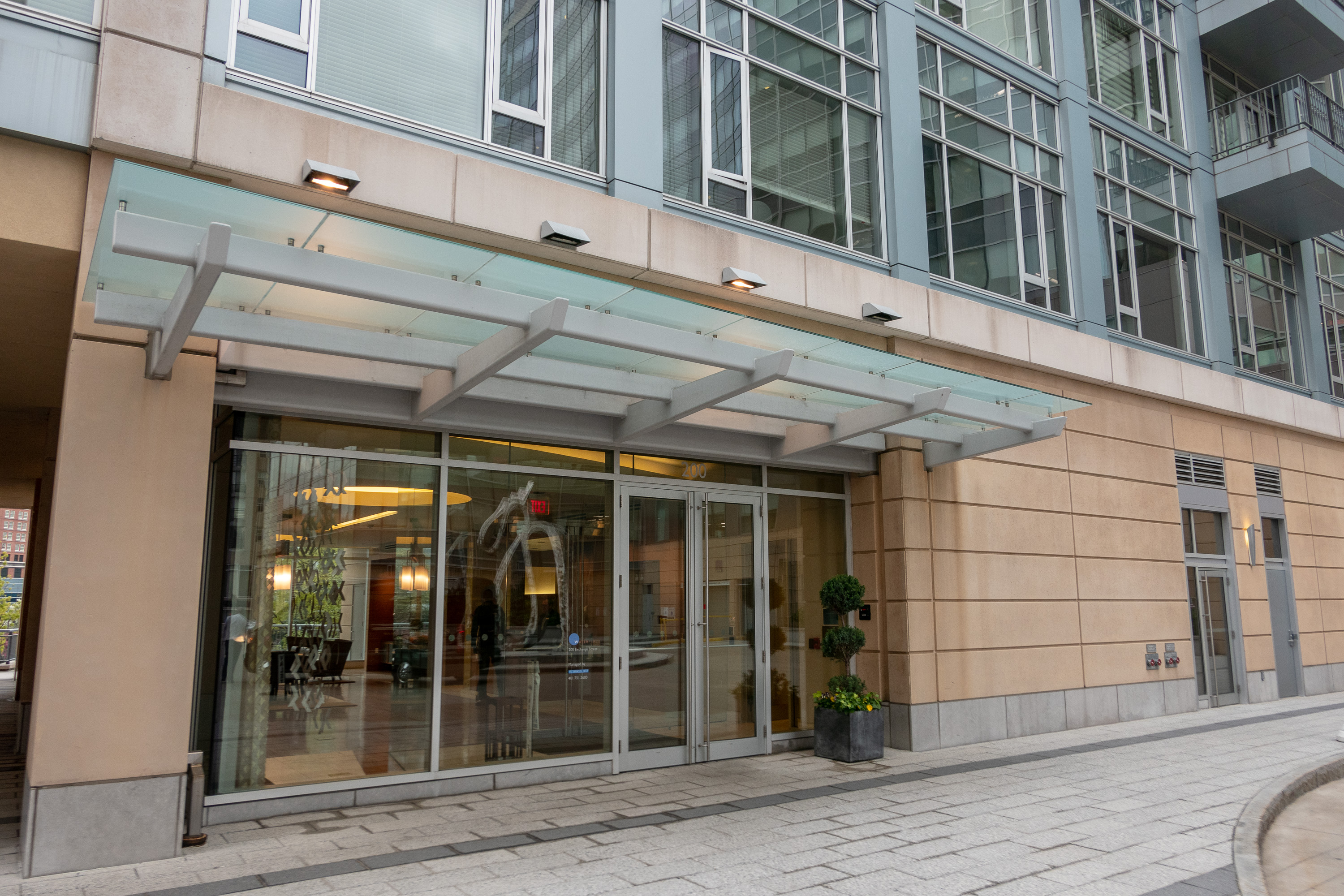
Entrance to Waterplace 2

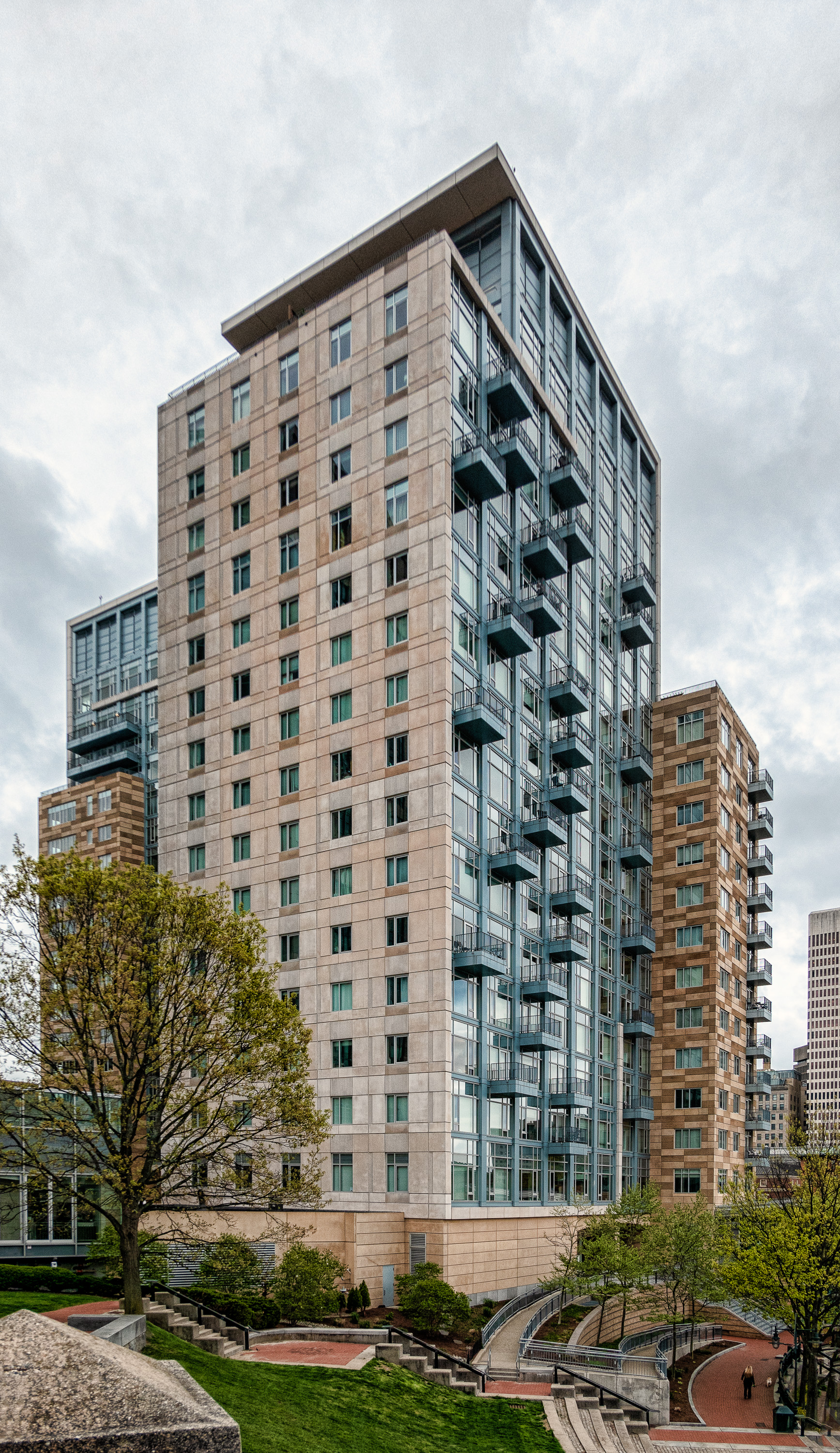
Waterplace 2
