= Davol Square =

Coordinates: 41.8179°N 71.4064°W

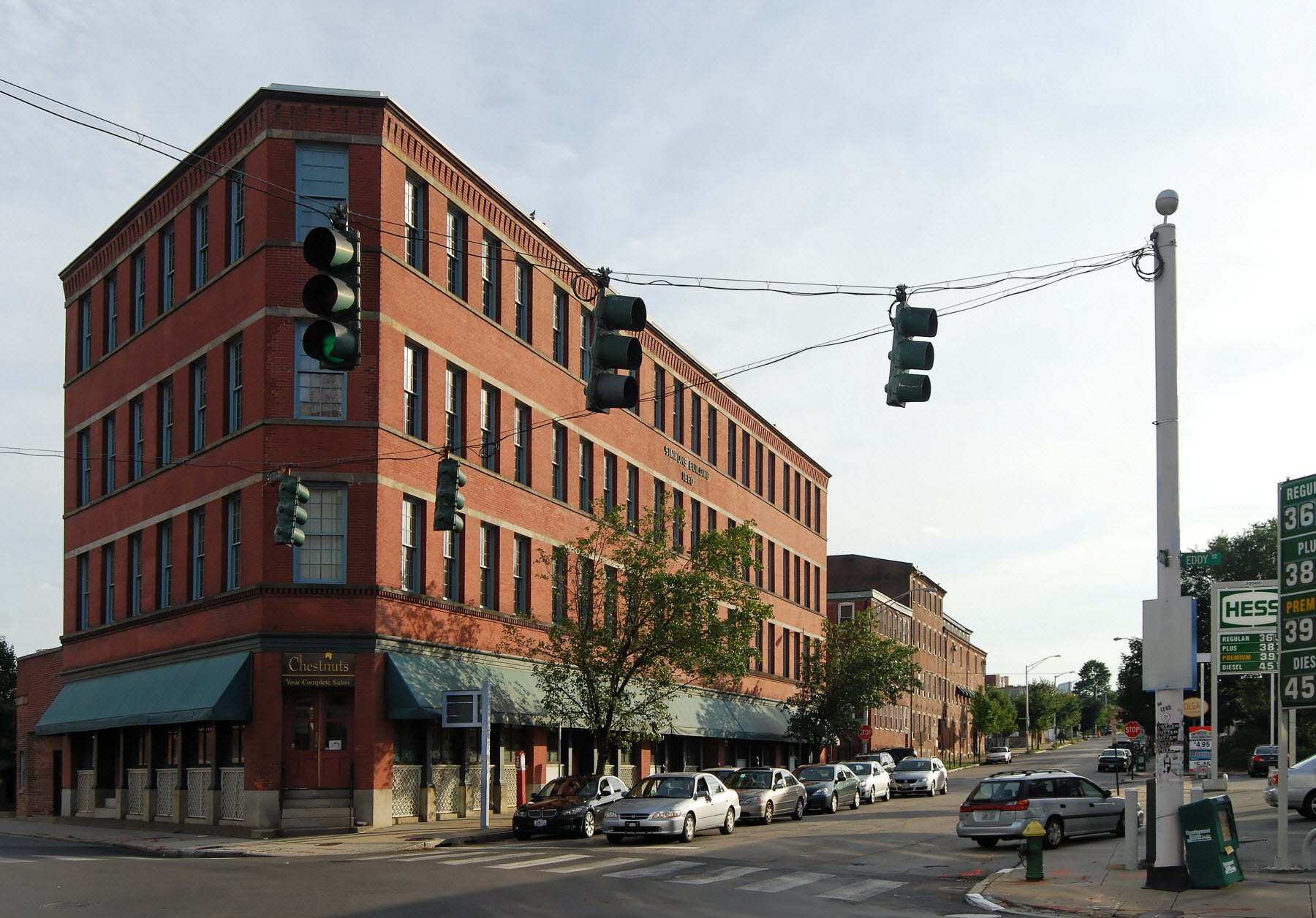
The Simmons Building, located at the corner of Eddy and Point Streets

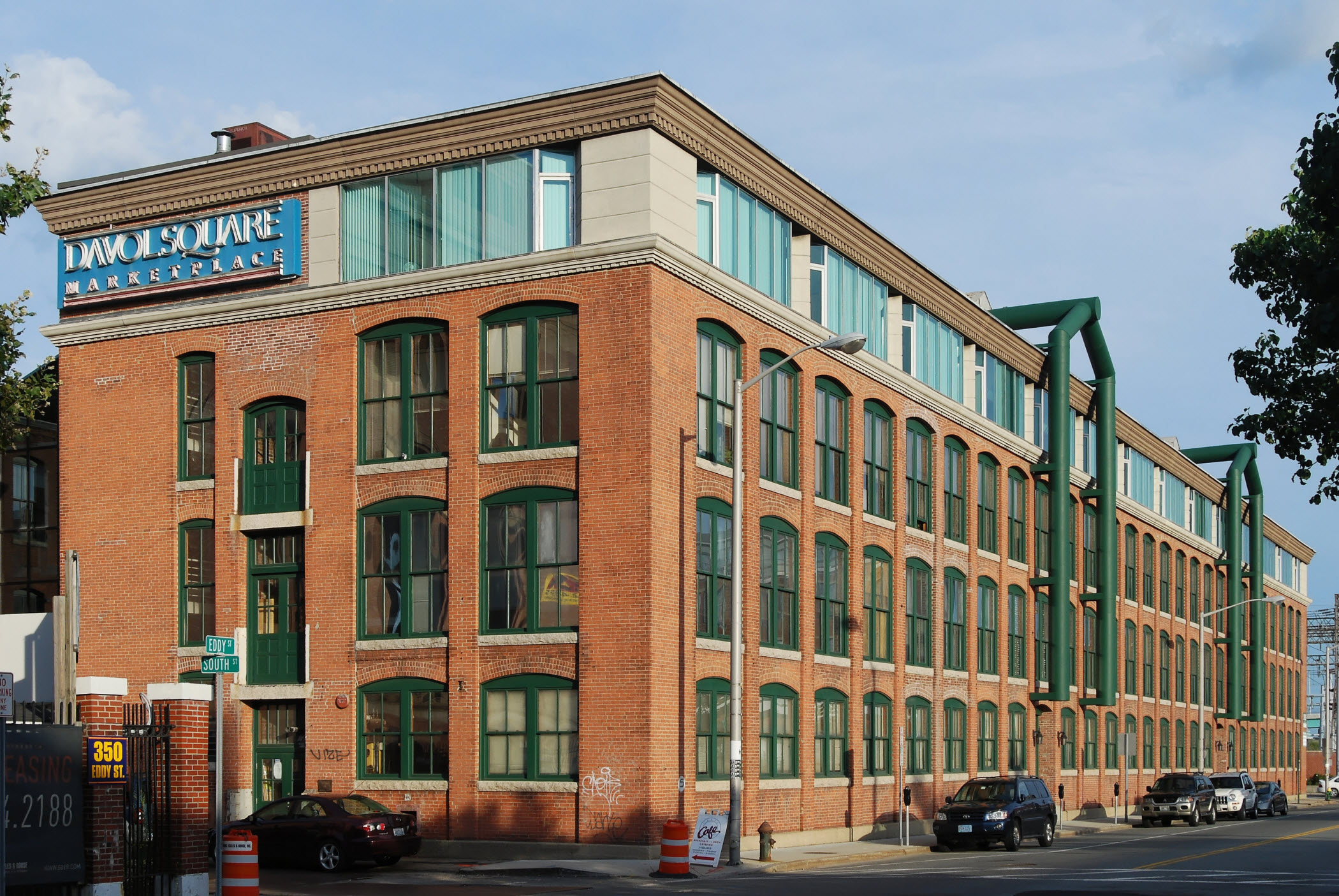
former Davol Rubber Company at Davol Square

Davol Square (/ˈdeɪvɔːl/ DAY-vawl) is a historic area within the Jewelry District of Providence, Rhode Island. It is located at the intersection of Point Street and Eddy Street.

== Description ==
The historic Davol Rubber Company complex is located at the northern corner of the intersection. The complex consists of interconnected brick buildings constructed between 1880 and 1913 for rubber and medical device manufacturing. In the 1980s, the complex was renovated by Beckman, Blydenburgh & Associates for use as a mixed-use office and shopping center; the complex reopened under the name Davol Square Marketplace. In the 2000s and 2010s, the complex was converted to commercial office space. Brown University owns a portion of the complex.

South Street Landing is situated north of the Davol Rubber Company complex along Eddy Street. Constructed as an electrical power generation plant, the building has since been redeveloped. It is now used as an administrative office and academic facility by a number of local universities. The property is owned by Ventas which additionally owns a stake in the Davol Rubber Company complex.

In 2005, a c. 1820 building located at the foot of the Point Street Bridge was demolished after its foundation was severely damaged during the construction of the Narragansett Bay Commission's combined sewer overflow project.

The Manchester Street Power Plant is located at the southeast corner of the intersection. The structure's three 321 foot (98 m) tall stacks are visible from many parts of the city.

The 1880 Simmons Building is located at the southwest corner of the intersection.

== See also ==
- Neighborhoods in Providence
- Providence Jewelry Manufacturing Historic District
