= Davol Rubber Company =

- U.S. National Register of Historic Places
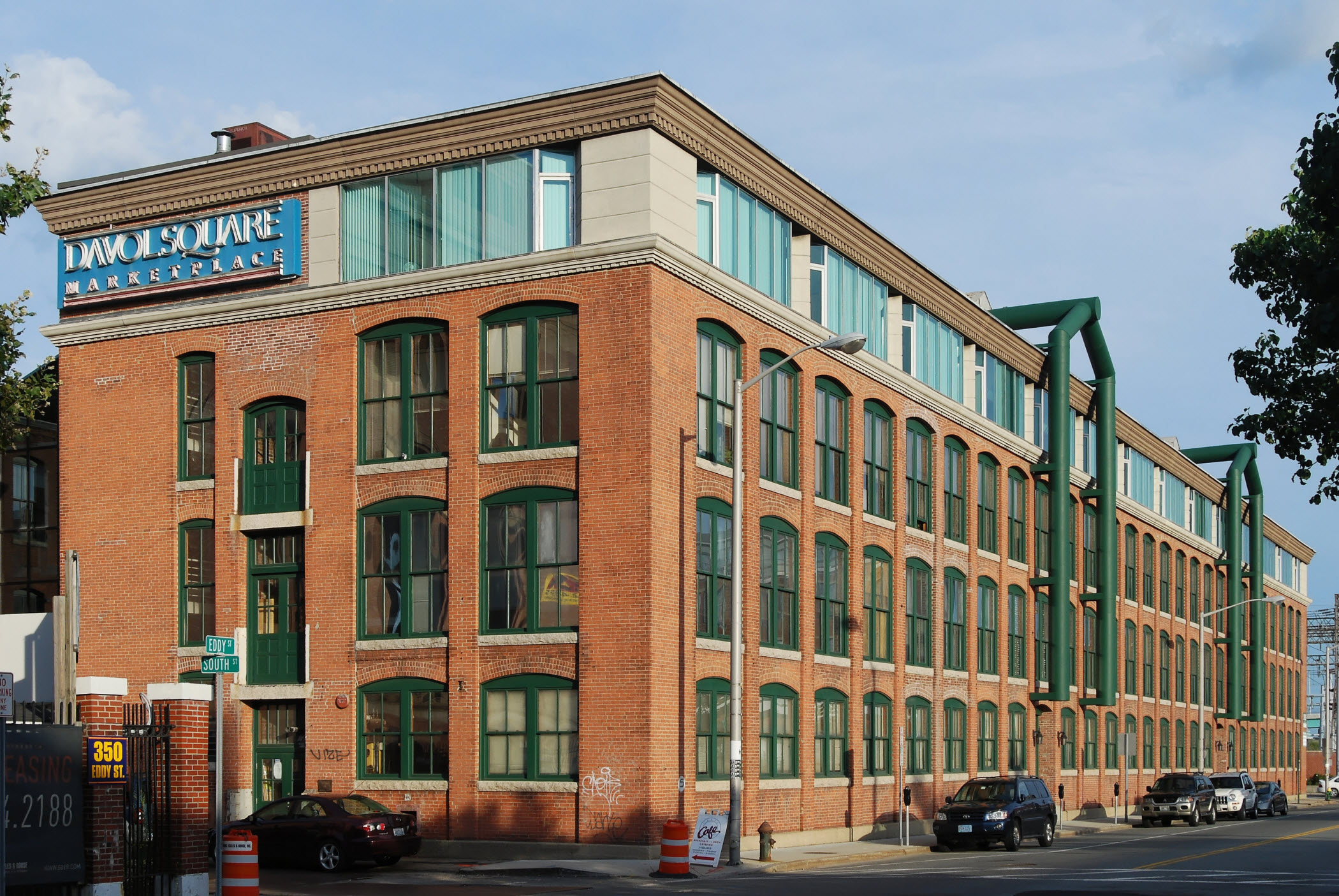
- Davol Square

- Location within Rhode Island Location within the United States
- Location: Providence, Rhode Island
- Coordinates: 41°49′2″N 71°24′25″W
- Built: 1880
- NRHP reference No.: 80000093
- Added to NRHP: June 27, 1980

The Davol Rubber Company (/ˈdeɪvɔːl/ DAY-vawl) is a historic industrial site at Davol Square, at Point and Eddy Streets in Providence, Rhode Island.

The building was constructed in 1880 and added to the National Register of Historic Places in 1980. It is located adjacent to the historic South Street Landing, which was renovated in 2017. The Providence Jewelry Manufacturing Historic District is also nearby.

== History ==
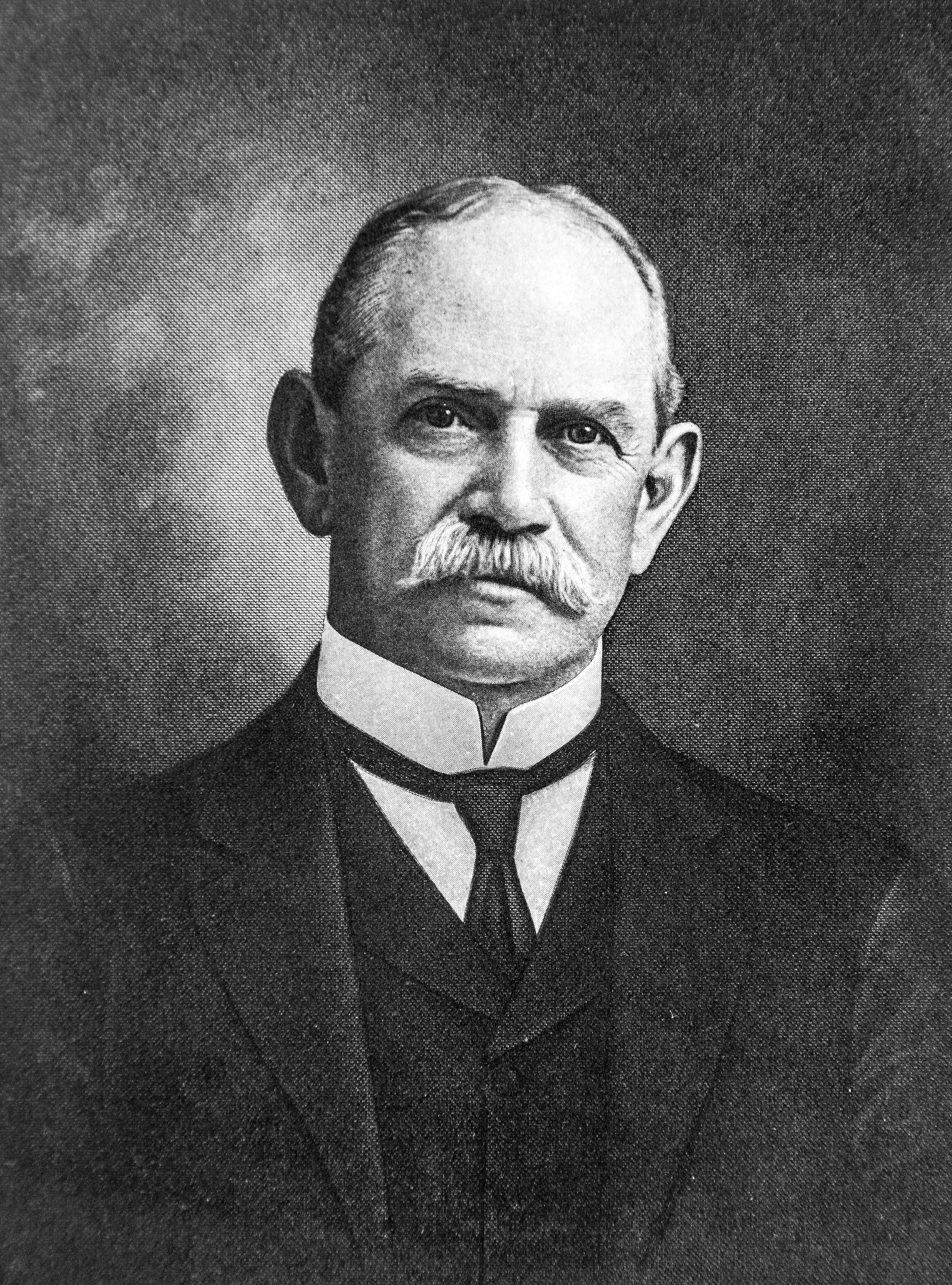
Joseph Davol (1837–1909), one of the founders of the company that eventually became Davol Rubber

The Perkins Manufacturing Company was founded in Providence by Emery Perkins and Joseph Davol in 1874, after two years of experiments and inventions by Joseph Davol. It produced rubber medical and surgical devices, such as hot water bottles and catheters. In 1878, Davol took control of the company and renamed it the Davol Manufacturing Company; in 1884 it became the Davol Rubber Company.

In 1934, the company began the manufacture of the Foley catheter. In 1971, the Davol Rubber Company opened a new facility in nearby Cranston, Rhode Island. The company was acquired by C.R. Bard, Inc. of New Jersey in 1980. The Davol Company, as it is currently known, is now located in Warwick, Rhode Island.

== Recent projects ==
Since Davol Rubber left, the building has had a series of tenants. The short-lived Davol Square Marketplace mall occupied the building complex in the 1980s. Later, it housed a mini-convention center for the costume jewelry industry for a short while. Various projects associated with Brown University have rented space in the building for many years, and the university recently announced plans to buy several buildings in the area.

== See also ==
- National Register of Historic Places listings in Providence, Rhode Island
