= Jewelry District (Providence) =

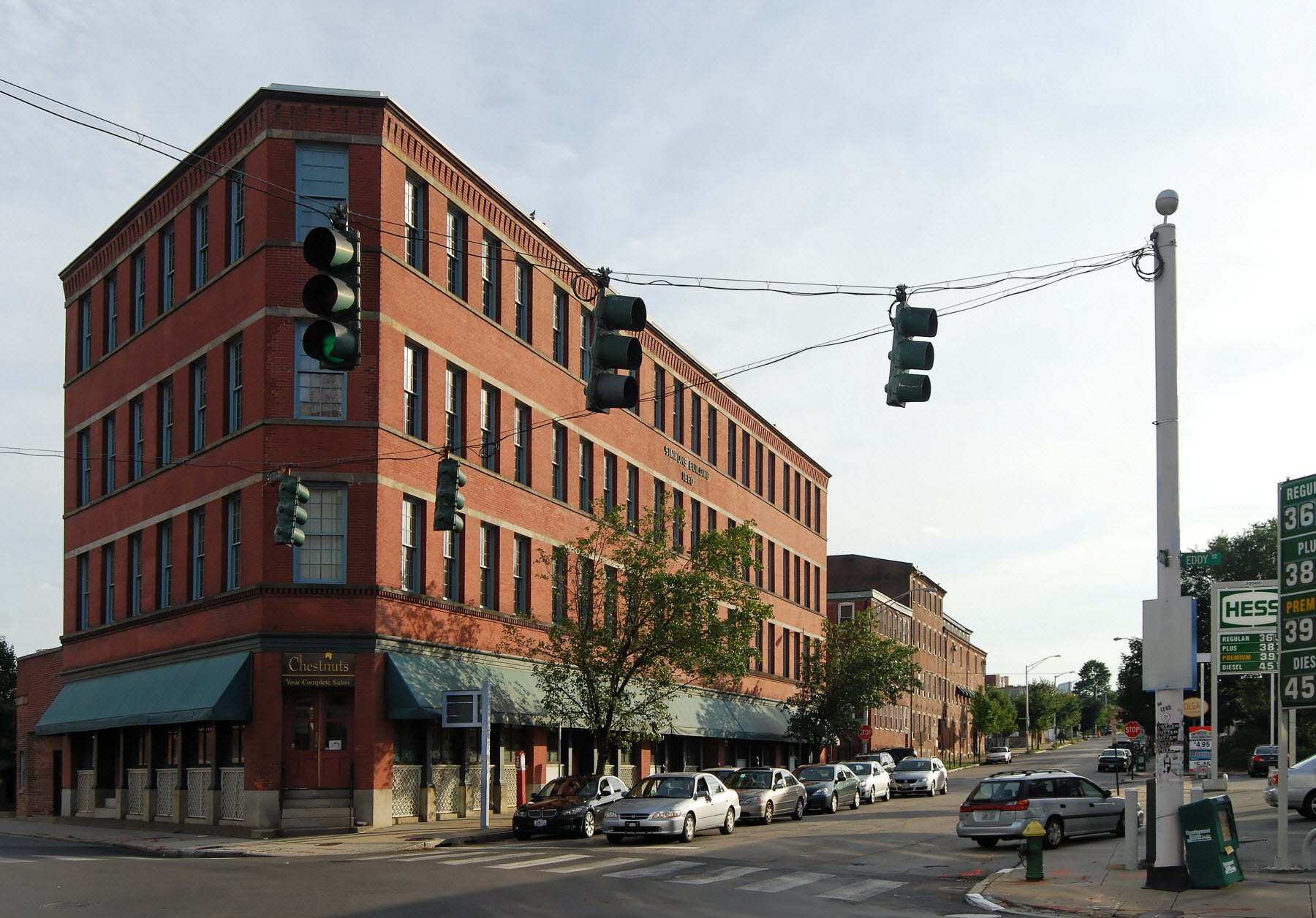

- Location of the Jewelry District (dark gray) and Downtown (medium gray) in Providence
- Coordinates: 41.818°N 71.407°W

The Jewelry District is a neighborhood of Providence, Rhode Island located just southeast of Downtown. The historical path of Interstate 195 delineates the neighborhood's northern border while Interstate 95 and the Providence River define its western, southern and eastern edges.

Beginning in the 19th century, the area became a center of jewelry manufacturing. In the 1960s, the area was detached from the rest of Downtown with the construction of Interstate 195. A major construction project completed in 2013 relocated Interstate 195 further south, reconnecting the district with Downtown Providence and freeing 19 buildable acres of land.

Contained within the Jewelry District neighborhood is the Providence Jewelry Manufacturing Historic District, added to the National Register of Historic Places in 1985 and expanded in 2012.

== History ==
During 19th and 20th centuries, the manufacturing of jewelry and costume jewelry emerged as a dominant local industry. Jewelry manufacturing began in the Providence in 1794; by 1880 Rhode Island's jewelry industry accounted for more than one quarter of the nation's jewelry production. The industry peaked in 1978 with 32,500 workers, then began a swift decline. By 1996, the number of jewelry workers shrank to 13,500.

Over the following decades, the large jewelry factories that had once dominated the Jewelry District were closed or vacated.

During the 2000s and early 2010s, a segment of Interstate 195 that marked the northeastern edge of the Jewelry District was relocated south. Dubbed the "Iway", the relocation project made available buildable 19 acres of land in and adjacent to the Jewelry District. Since 2018, a number of major projects have begun and been completed on and adjacent to the redevelopment parcels. Among the development project are multiple housing complexes, a six story parking garage, and a hotel.

The city and state have marketed the new neighborhood as Providence's "Innovation & Design District", with the intention of establishing the area as a hub for science, technology, and education in the city.

In 2019, the city opened a new pedestrian bridge, connecting the Jewelry District to East Side; an adjacent waterfront park was opened the following year.

== Geography ==
=== Landmarks ===
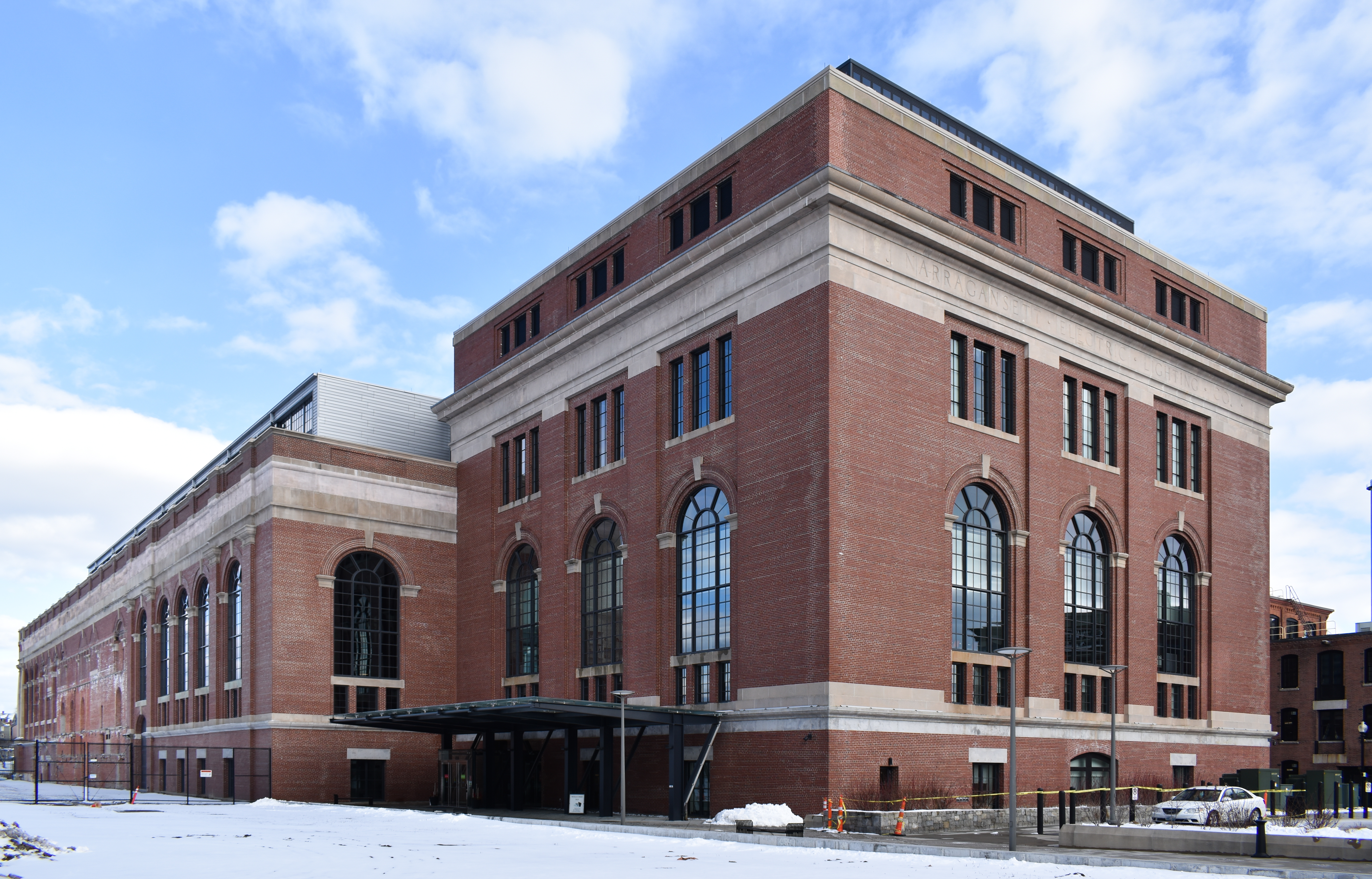
South Street Landing in 2021

The Fox Point Hurricane Barrier is the most prominent feature of this area. The barrier protects Providence from storm surge flooding like that it endured in the 1938 New England Hurricane and again in 1954 from Hurricane Carol. In both storms, downtown flooded to a depth of over eight feet at some locations. Downtown has not suffered substantial flooding since the construction of the barrier.

Additionally recognizable are the three smokestacks of the Manchester Street Generating Station and the large brick form of South Street Station.

South Street Landing is a prominent structure in the neighborhood, located on Eddy Street right on the river, adjacent to the Point Street Bridge. The large building had served as a power station from 1912 to 1995, and subsequently sat vacant and decaying for many years. Various redevelopment projects were proposed which never came to fruition. In 2017 the structure was entirely renovated and re-opened under the name South Street Landing. The building is shared by Brown University, Rhode Island College, and University of Rhode Island. A 750-space parking garage was constructed adjacent to the building.

=== Collier Point Park ===
Collier Point Park is located along the Providence waterfront south of Davol Square. The park was home to a decommissioned Russian submarine, Juliet 484, which was used in 2000 for the filming of the movie K-19: The Widowmaker in Halifax, Nova Scotia. The submarine had been in use as a museum until the submarine sank in a storm April 17–18, 2007. The submarine's owners had planned to salvage the submarine and reopen the museum, but were unable to obtain sufficient funds for the project.

== Gallery ==
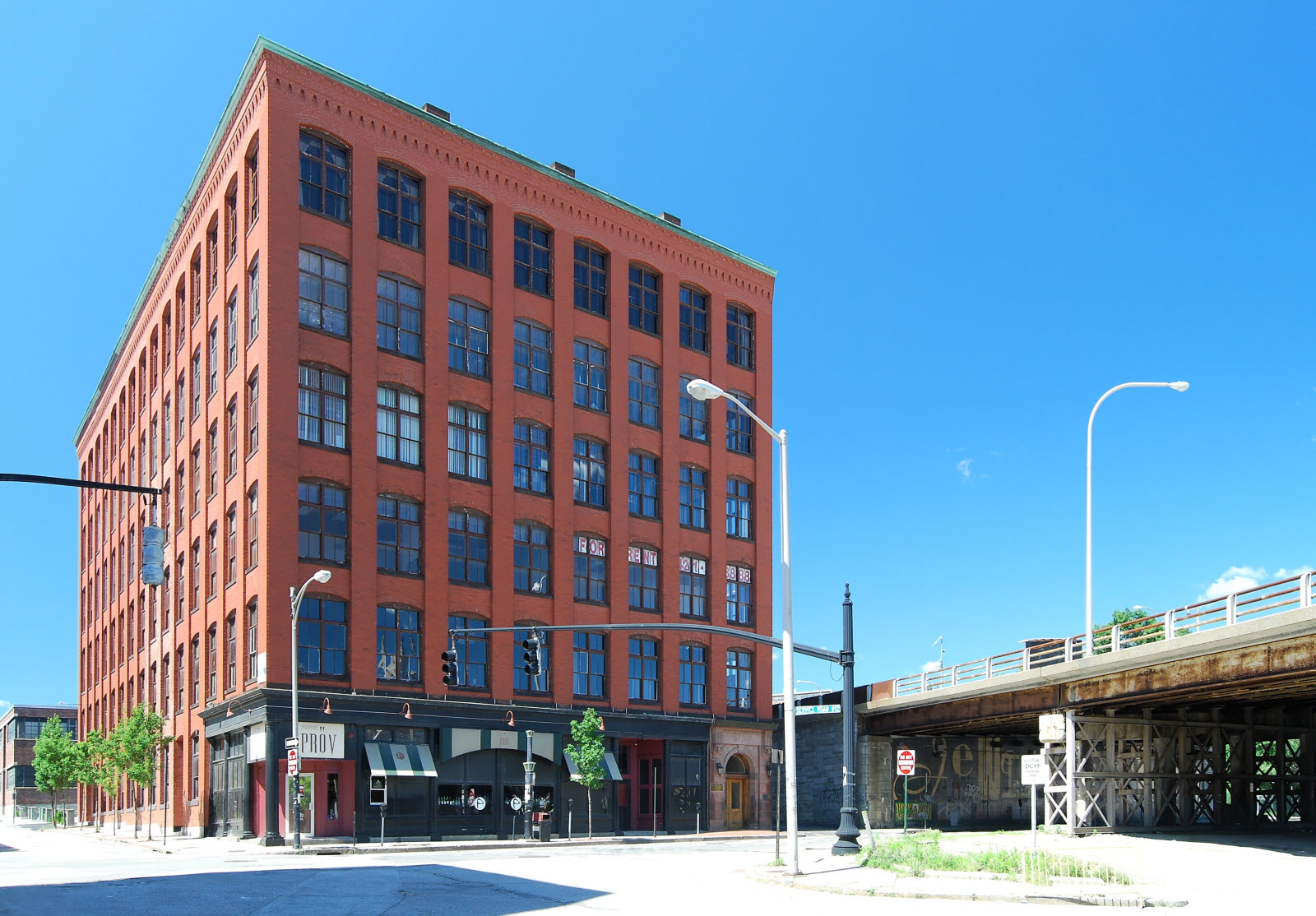
The intersection of Clifford and Chestnut Streets in 2009. I-195 (visible to the left) has since been re-routed.

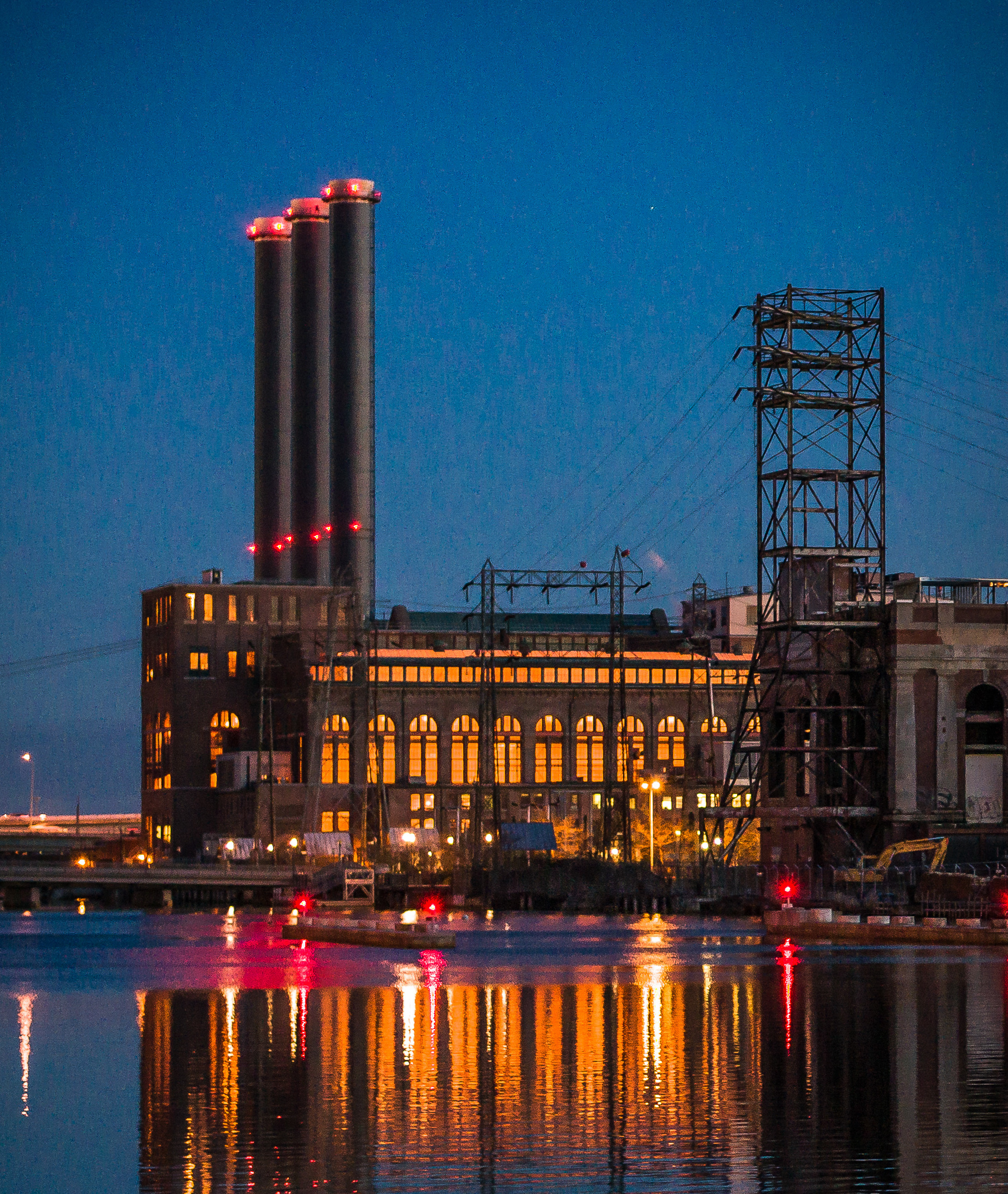
The Manchester Street Generating Station, a gas fired power station

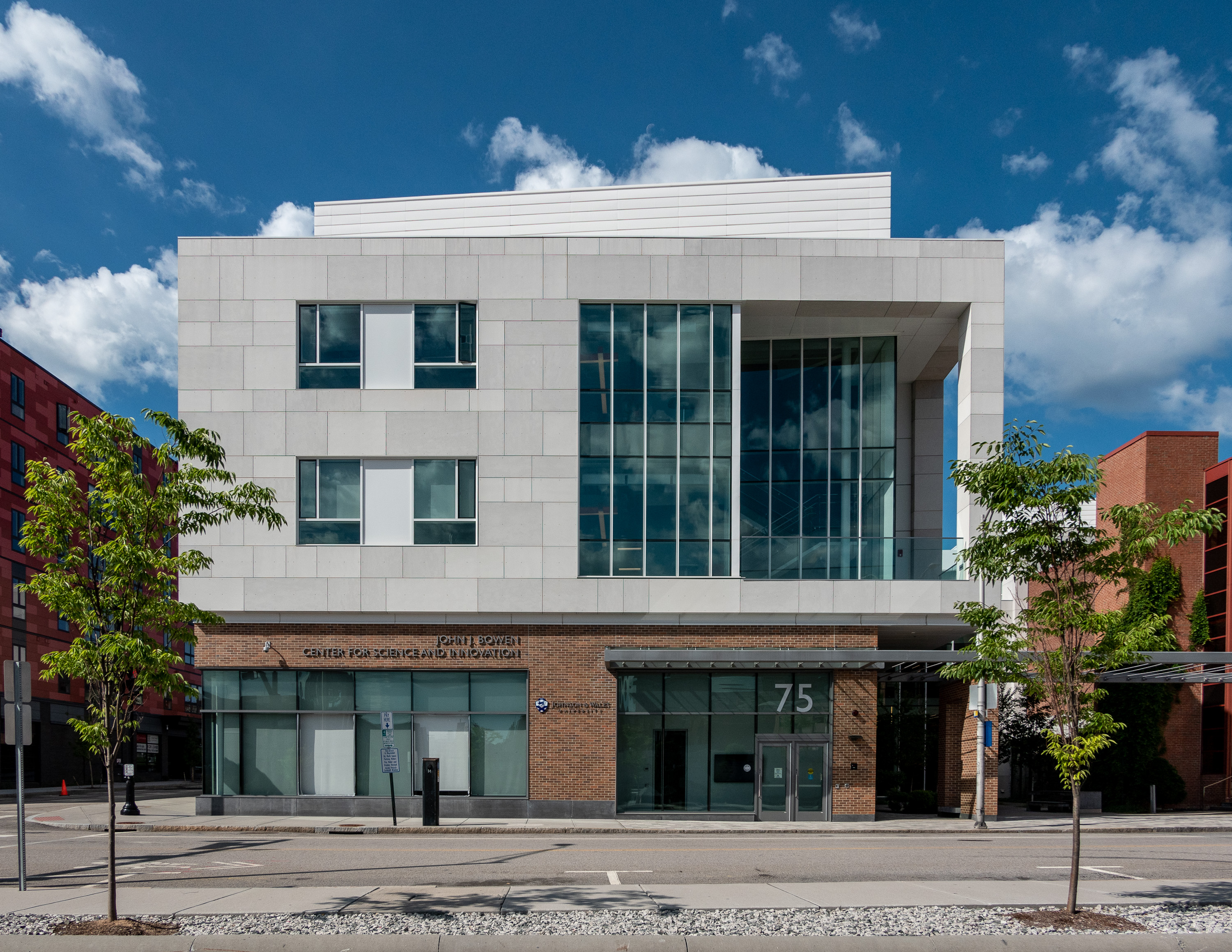
In 2016 Johnson & Wales University opened a new STEM building on land vacated by Interstate 195.

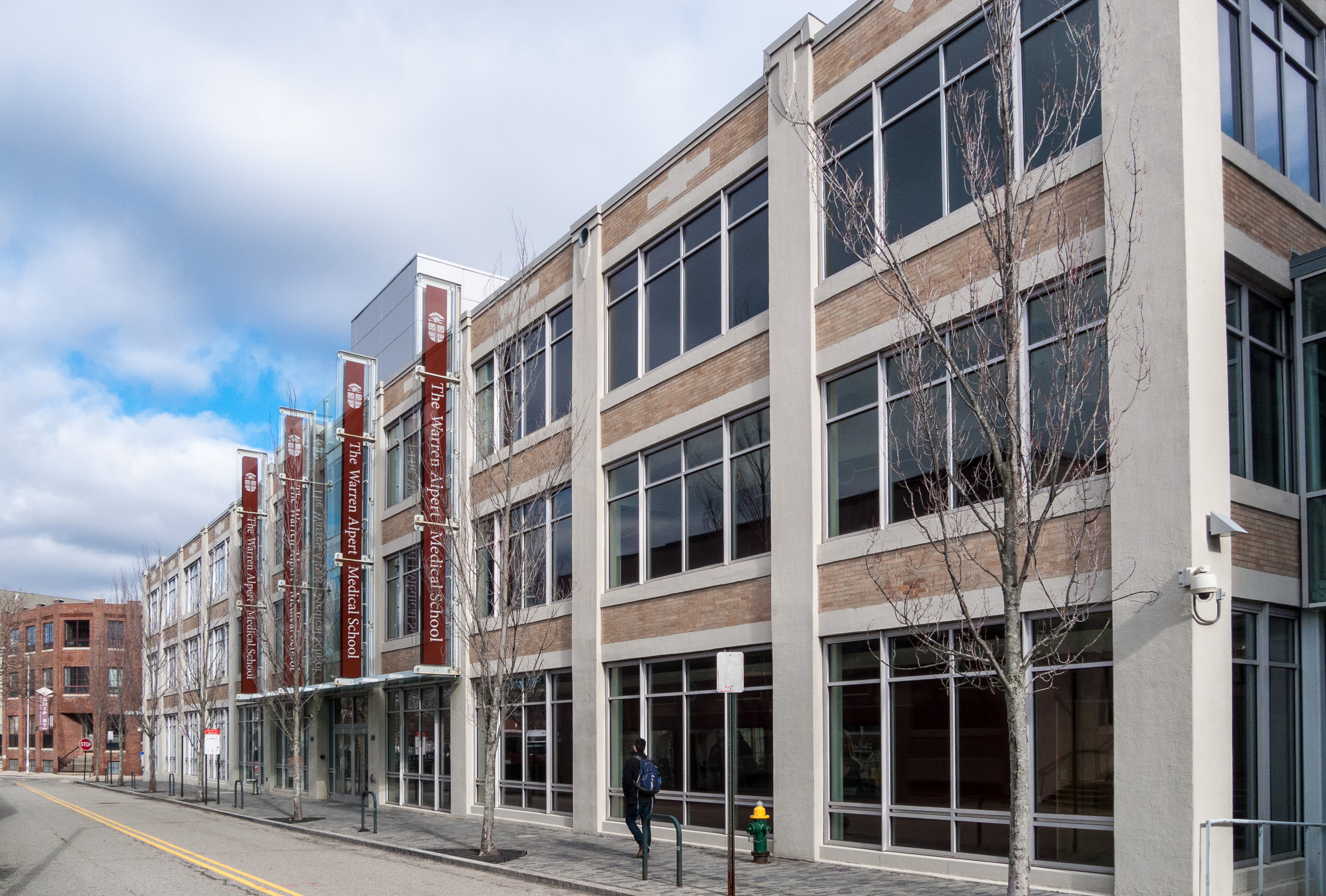
Brown University's Alpert Medical School is located in the Jewelry District

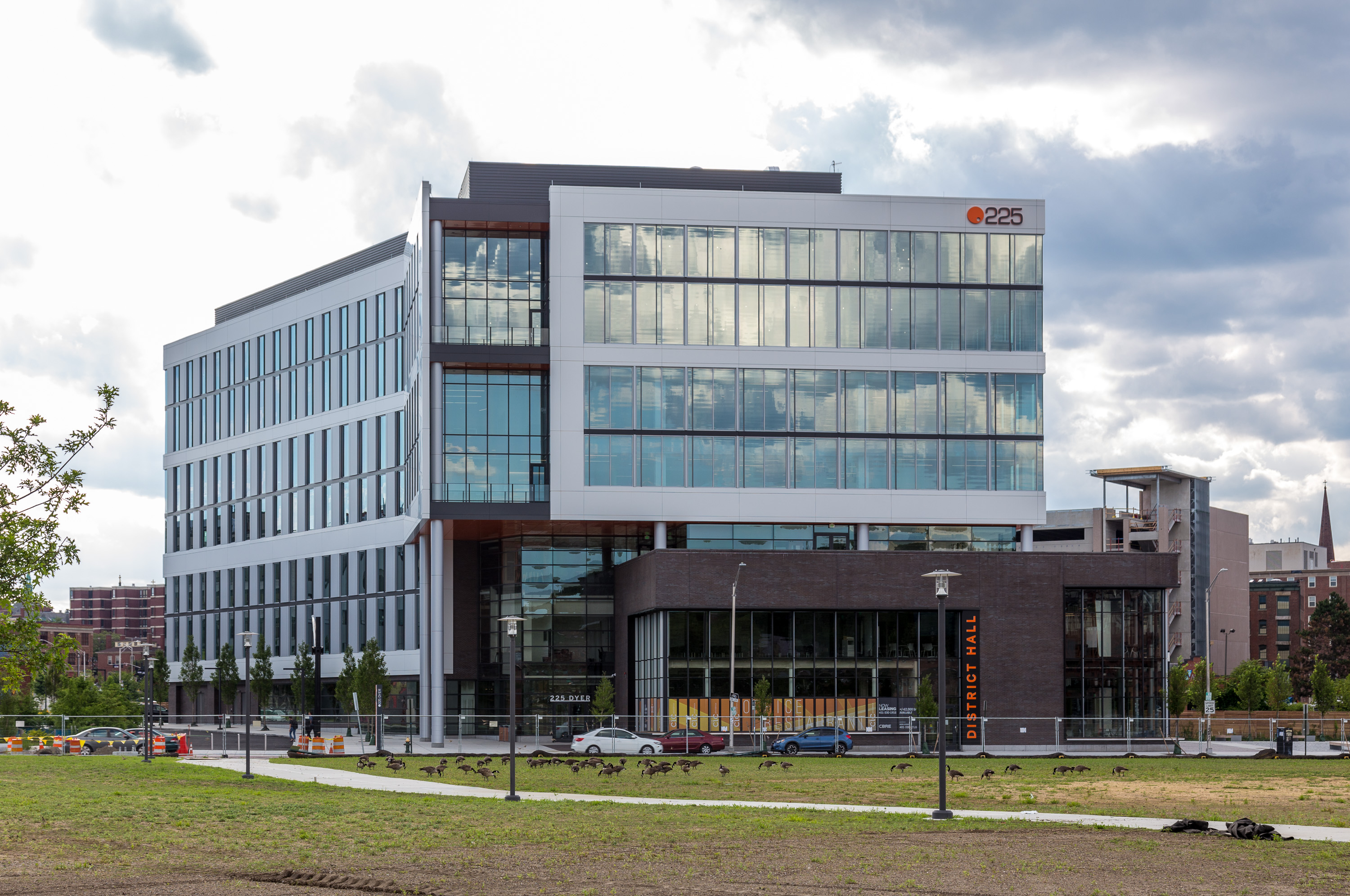
The Wexford Innovation Center is one of the largest new office developments in the area.

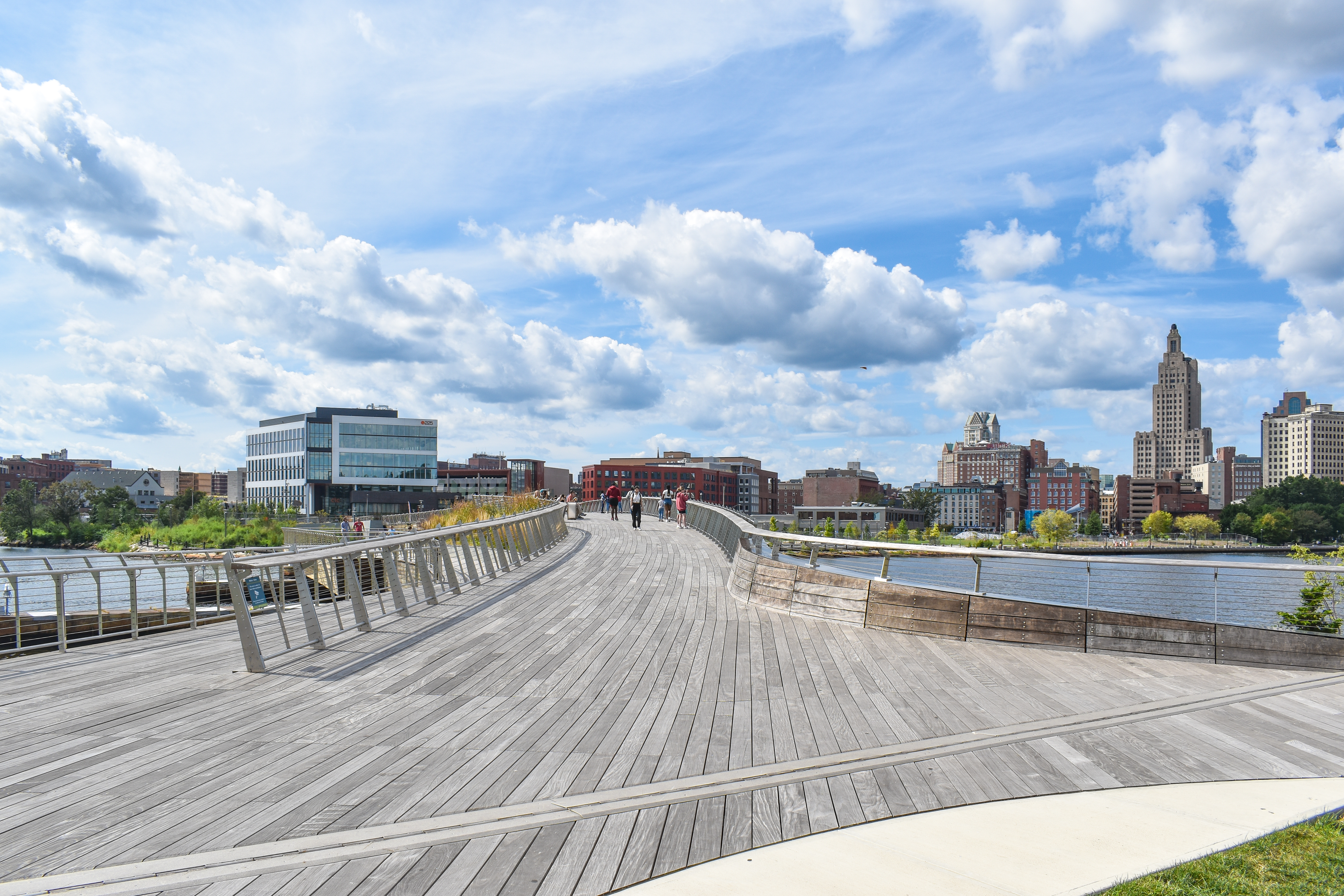
The Michael S. Van Leesten Memorial Bridge connects the neighborhood to the city's East Side
