= South Street station =

South Street station may refer to:

- South Street station (MBTA), Boston
- South Street station (LIRR), Queens, New York City
- South Street station (Pennsylvania Railroad), Newark, New Jersey
- South Street Station (Rhode Island), historic power generation station in Providence, Rhode Island
- South Street Station (South Bend, Indiana)
