= Fox Point Hurricane Barrier =

Dam in Rhode Island, United States

Coordinates: 41.81601°N 71.40149°W

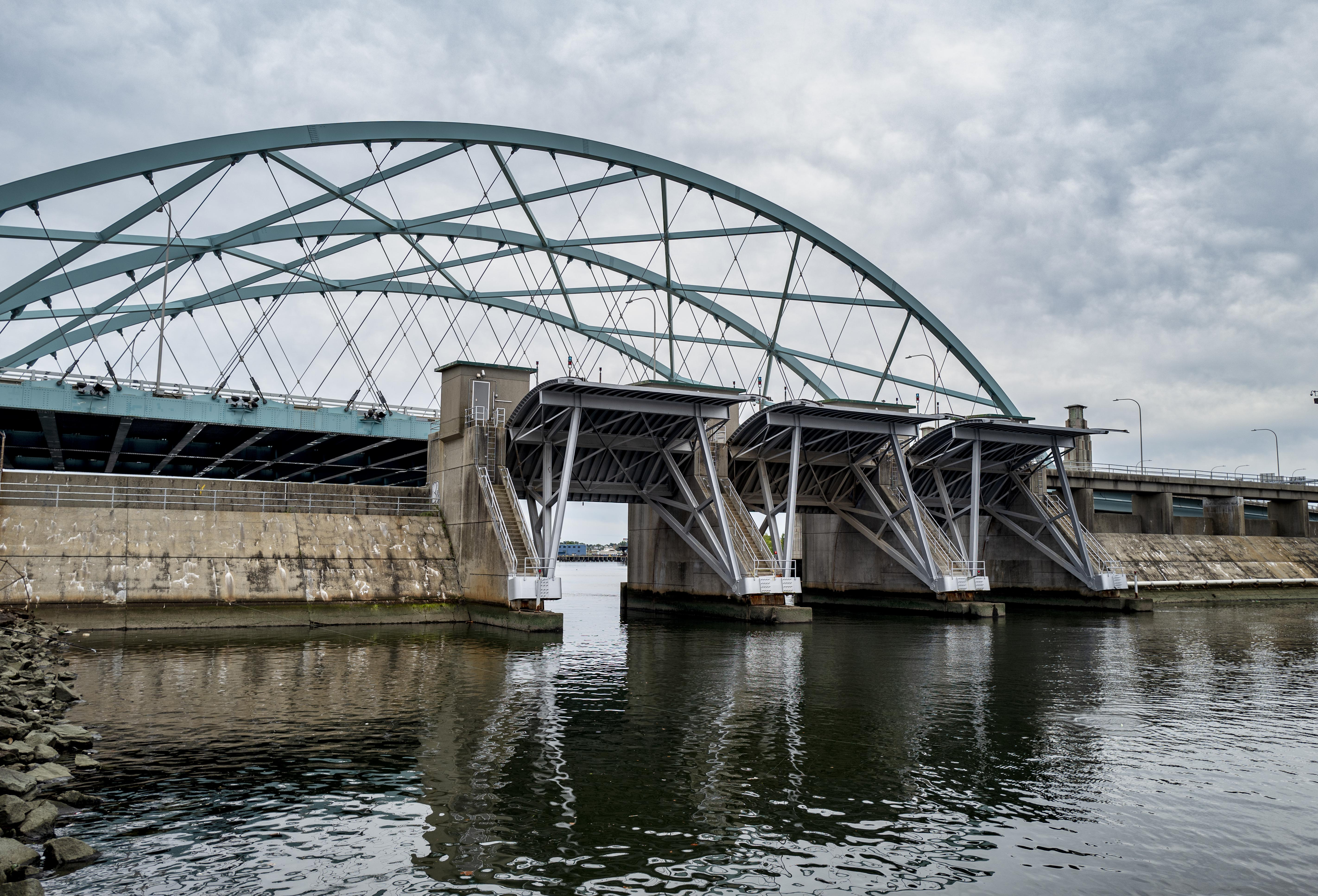
The tainter gates of the Fox Point Hurricane Barrier Gates. The Providence River Bridge is visible in the immediate background.

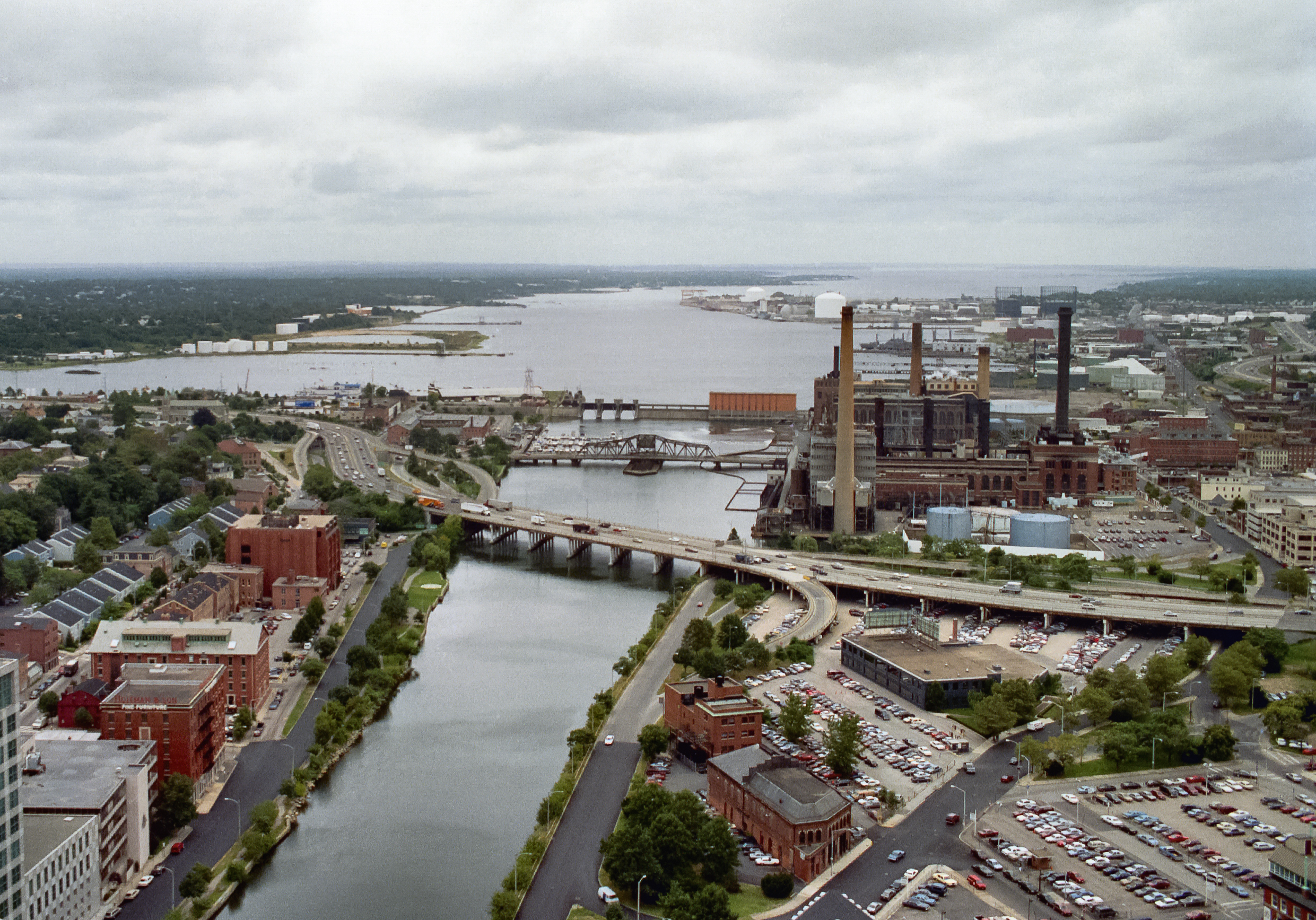
This 1990 view over Providence shows the hurricane barrier as it appeared before the construction of the adjacent Providence River Bridge

The Fox Point Hurricane Barrier is a 3,000-foot (910 m) long tidal flood barrier spanning the Providence River in Providence, Rhode Island, located 750 feet (230 m) upstream from Fox Point. It was constructed between 1960 and 1966 to protect the low-lying downtown area of the city from damaging storm surge and floods associated with hurricanes and other major storm events.

The Fox Point Hurricane Barrier consists of five main parts: river gates, rock and earthen dikes along each shore, vehicular gates along each shore where roads pass through the dikes, canal gates at the west end of the barrier associated with the nearby electric power station, and a pumping station to control the flow of water.

== Historical background ==
Since colonial times, the port of Providence, located at the head of Narragansett Bay, has been a vital part of the city's economy. Ocean-going ships regularly dock along the city's waterfront just south of downtown. During the 19th century, the city became a national leader in industrial output and trade. The downtown area is located in a shallow natural basin with an elevation of only 8–12 feet (2.4–3.7 m) above mean sea level.

In September 1938, the Great New England Hurricane slammed the coast of Southern New England, killing 250 people in the region and causing millions of dollars in damage. Downtown Providence, a bustling center of commerce, was entirely submerged under water, causing about $120 million in damage in the city alone.

Again in 1954, the area was hit by Hurricane Carol, which produced an even higher storm surge of 14.4 feet above mean sea level that resulted in water levels as high as 8 feet (2.4 m) in some parts of Downtown Providence, and resulted in over $41 million in damage.

Local, state and federal officials decided to take action to prevent future devastation. Construction of the barrier was authorized in 1958 under the Flood Control Act.

The $16 million wall has never seen a Category 5 hurricane, but has successfully protected the city in every instance since its construction.

== Features ==
Constructed between 1960 and 1966 at a cost of $14 million, the barrier was the first of its type to be approved for construction in the United States.

=== River gates ===
The main feature of the hurricane barrier is a group of three large movable gates which span the river, allowing boats to pass through during normal periods. Each of the three Tainter gates is 40 feet (12 m) wide and weighs 53 tons with a curved outer portion facing the tide. It takes about 30 minutes to lower each gate. The relatively narrow gates prohibit large ships from passing into the inner downtown harbor as they did in the 19th century. However, modern ocean-going vessels now dock at the Port of Providence, located south of the barrier. The inner harbor is now generally occupied by only small pleasure craft during the summer months.

=== Dikes ===
The majority of the hurricane barrier's length consists of a 25-foot (7.6 m) high rock and earthen dike along the low-lying areas of the waterfront within the Fox Point and Jewelry District neighborhoods of Providence. The original dike located along the eastern shore has been removed and replaced with vertical concrete walls as part of the construction of the new embankment for the Interstate 195 relocation.

=== Vehicular gates ===
Three sets of huge steel vehicular gates are located under the newly constructed portion of Interstate 195, east of the Providence River Bridge, at South Water, South Main and at Benefit Street. On the west shore, vehicular gates are located at Allens Avenue as well as on the property of the Manchester Street Power Plant. The gates are normally in the "open" position to allow traffic to pass through, but are closed to provide a continuous barrier during emergency events.

=== Canal gates ===
On the west side of the river, there are also two large canal gates, which control water used to cool the nearby Manchester Street Power Station, which is operated by Dominion Resources.

=== Pumping station ===
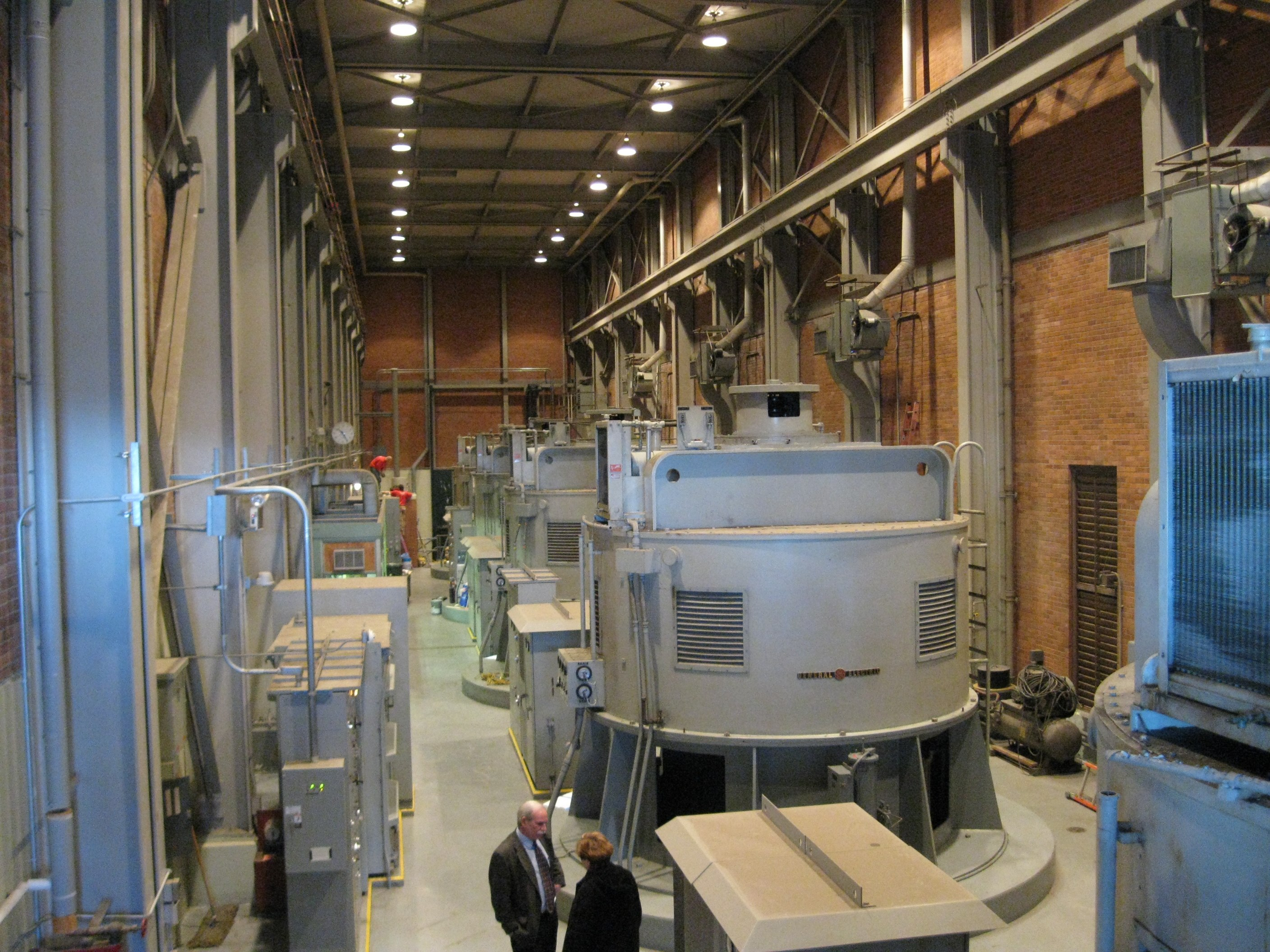
View inside the Fox Point pumping station

The barrier also includes a pumping station, housed within a concrete and brick structure located near the western shore of the river. The pumping station contains five 4500 H.P. pumps with instantaneous starting power, and are designed to convey water from the Providence River over the barrier when the gates are closed. (Otherwise, the continuously flowing river water would have no place to go).

Each pump is about 54.7 feet (16.7 m) high and 20 feet (6.1 m) in diameter, and together they can pump 3.1 million gallons (11,735 cubic meters) per minute.

Gauges inside the pumping station measure the water level inside and outside the barrier, and control the pumps, in order to maintain the water levels on either side as closely as possible.

== Usage in protecting Providence ==
The gate was closed during a gale on Jan. 10, 1978 preventing two feet of water from flooding downtown Providence.

In 1985, the Fox Point Hurricane Barrier was utilized, sparing downtown Providence from being inundated in two feet of water from storm surge brought by Hurricane Gloria, keeping the city dry. In 1991, the Barrier spared the city from Hurricane Bob, which would have covered downtown in four feet of water. The savings has been estimated at several hundred million dollars and the project operates at a cost-benefit ratio of 2.21 to 1.

A $3 million overhaul of the barrier's five massive pumps was completed in 2006.

It is believed by witnesses, during a storm on April 18, 2007, flow from the pumps from the hurricane barrier contributed to the sinking of the Soviet submarine K-77 which was then being used as a museum.

The barrier was closed on August 28, 2011, in preparation for Hurricane Irene.

The barrier was closed on October 29, 2012, due to Hurricane Sandy. The water crested at 9.5 feet, the fifth highest crest on record. The flood stage is 7 feet.

The barrier was closed again on the morning of August 22, 2021, as Tropical Storm Henri arrived.

The barrier is also routinely used to keep the river level higher during low tides, for the benefit of WaterFire events.
