= Crawford Street Bridge (Providence, Rhode Island) =

Former bridge in Providence, Rhode Island

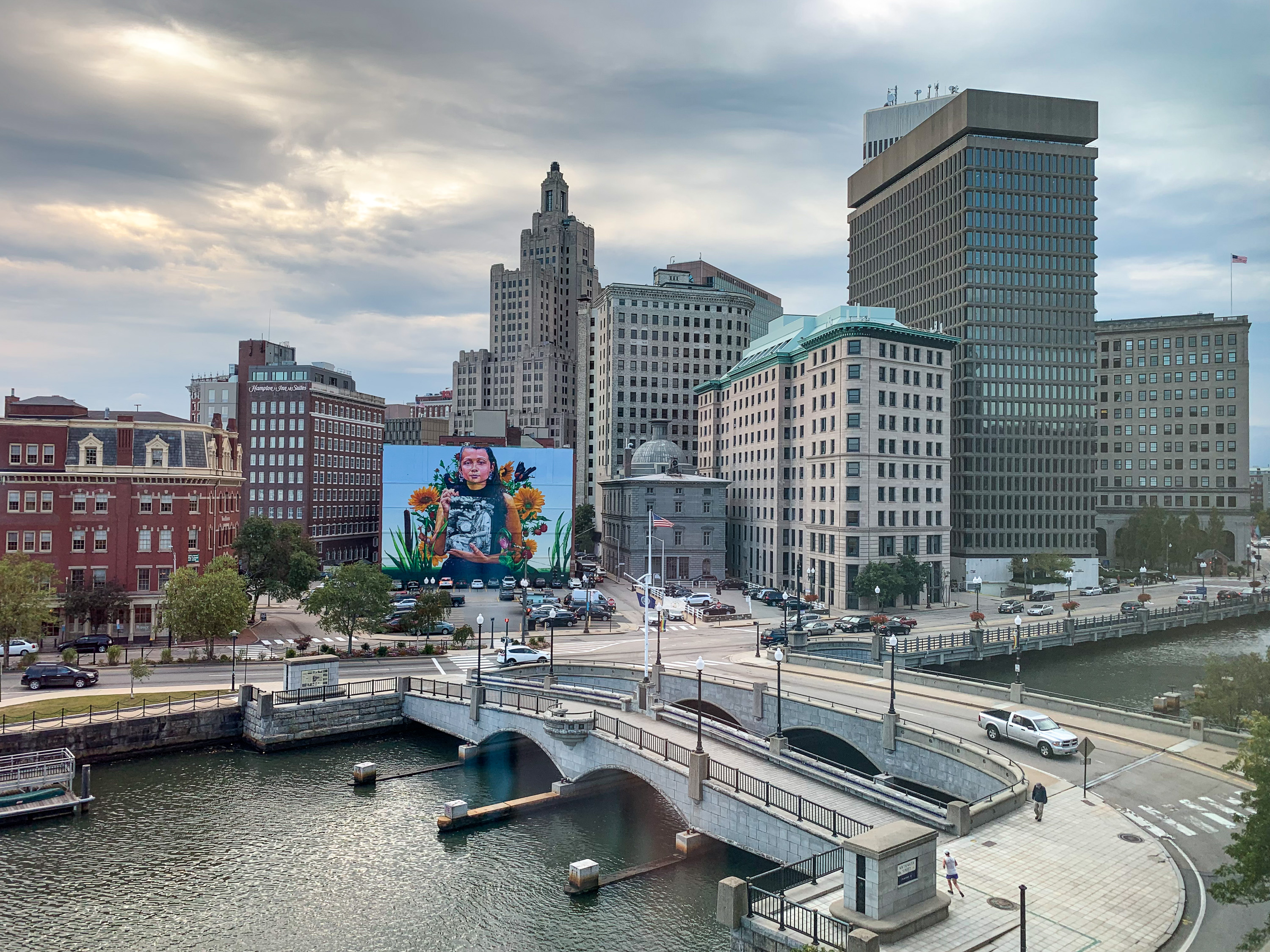
- Crawford Street Bridge in 2019
- Coordinates: 41.8242°N 71.4079°W
- Crossed: Providence River
- Locale: Providence, Rhode Island
- Official name: Robert E. Rowan, P.E. Bridge

History
- Opened: 1873
- Rebuilt: 1930
- Demolished: 1995

Statistics
- Daily traffic: automobiles and pedestrians

Location
- Interactive map of Crawford Street Bridge

The Crawford Street Bridge was a concrete and steel bridge over the Providence River in downtown Providence, Rhode Island. It was originally built from 1873 to 1904 and then rebuilt starting in 1930. Composed of a set of abutting bridges that spanned the river, it had a total area of over 3 acres (1.2 hectares) and covered nearly a quarter of a mile of the river. At 1,147 feet (350 m) wide, it was the world's widest bridge, and listed in the 1988 Guinness Book of World Records.

As part of a downtown redevelopment project, the massive bridge was substantially demolished between 1985 and 1995, replaced with several narrower bridges for individual streets and exposing the Providence River to create a more pedestrian-friendly cityscape.

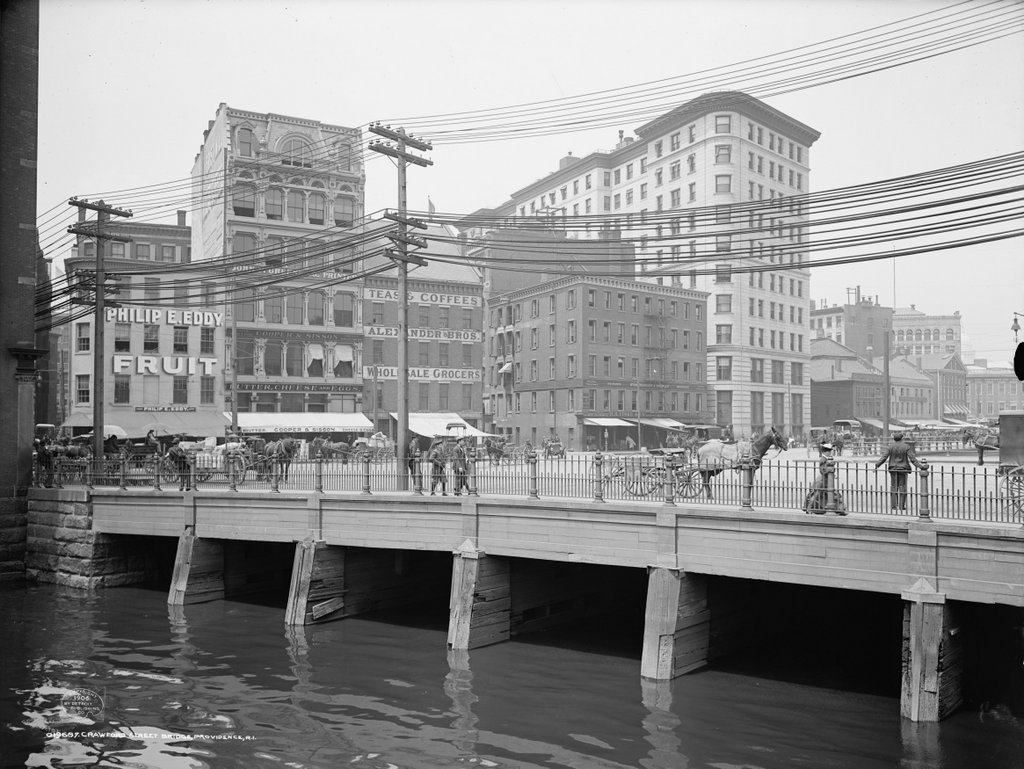
Crawford Street bridge in 1906
