= Manchester Street Generating Station =

Power plant in Rhode Island

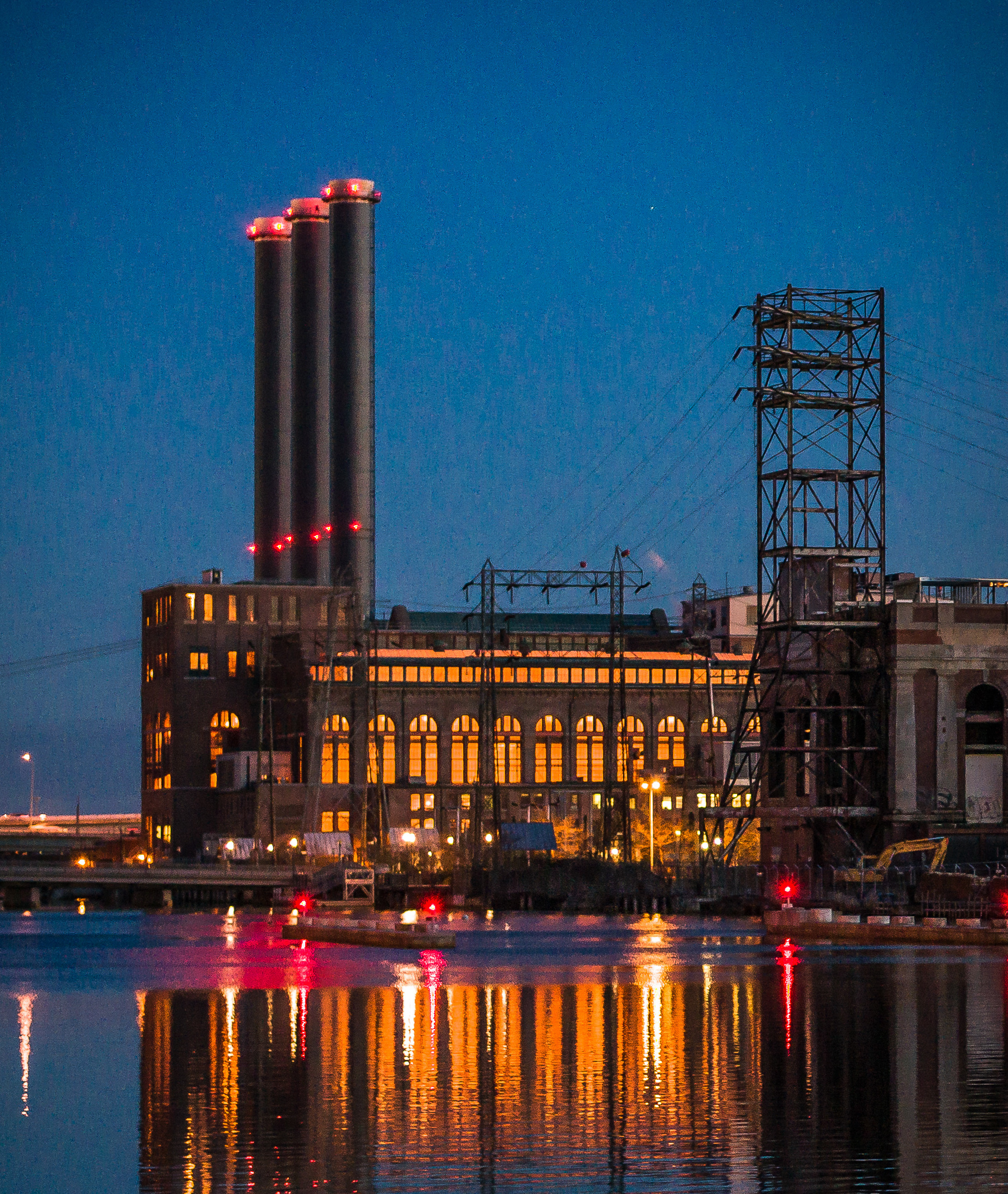
- Manchester Street Generating Station in Providence, Rhode Island
- Country: United States
- Coordinates: 41.815829°N 71.404329°W
- Owner: Starwood Energy Group

Power generation
- Nameplate capacity: 515 MW

External links
- Commons: Related media on Commons

The Manchester Street Generating Station is a 510 MW combined cycle gas-fired power station in the Jewelry District of Providence, Rhode Island. The station's main building is located along the Providence River and defined by three 321 foot (98 m) tall smoke stacks. The plant has three Siemens gas turbines and three ABB steam turbines.

The power station is owned by Starwood Energy Group, which purchased the facility from Dominion Energy in 2018.

== History ==
The Manchester Street Generating Station was constructed as a coal-burning power plant in 1903 by the Rhode Island Company, in part to power trolley lines. The monumental Georgian revival building is thought to be designed by architect Alfred Stone. In 1913, the company constructed two additions to the original power house: a boiler room and a switch house. The facility was purchased from the Rhode Island Company by Narragansett Electric Company in 1926.

In 1940, noted architect Paul Philippe Cret designed an addition to the building's southern facade, as part of renovations to convert the station to fuel oil. A 1996 renovation by William D. Warner Architects & Planners integrated postmodern elements and the structure's three smokestacks.

== See also ==
- South Street Station
