= Providence River =

River in Rhode Island, United States

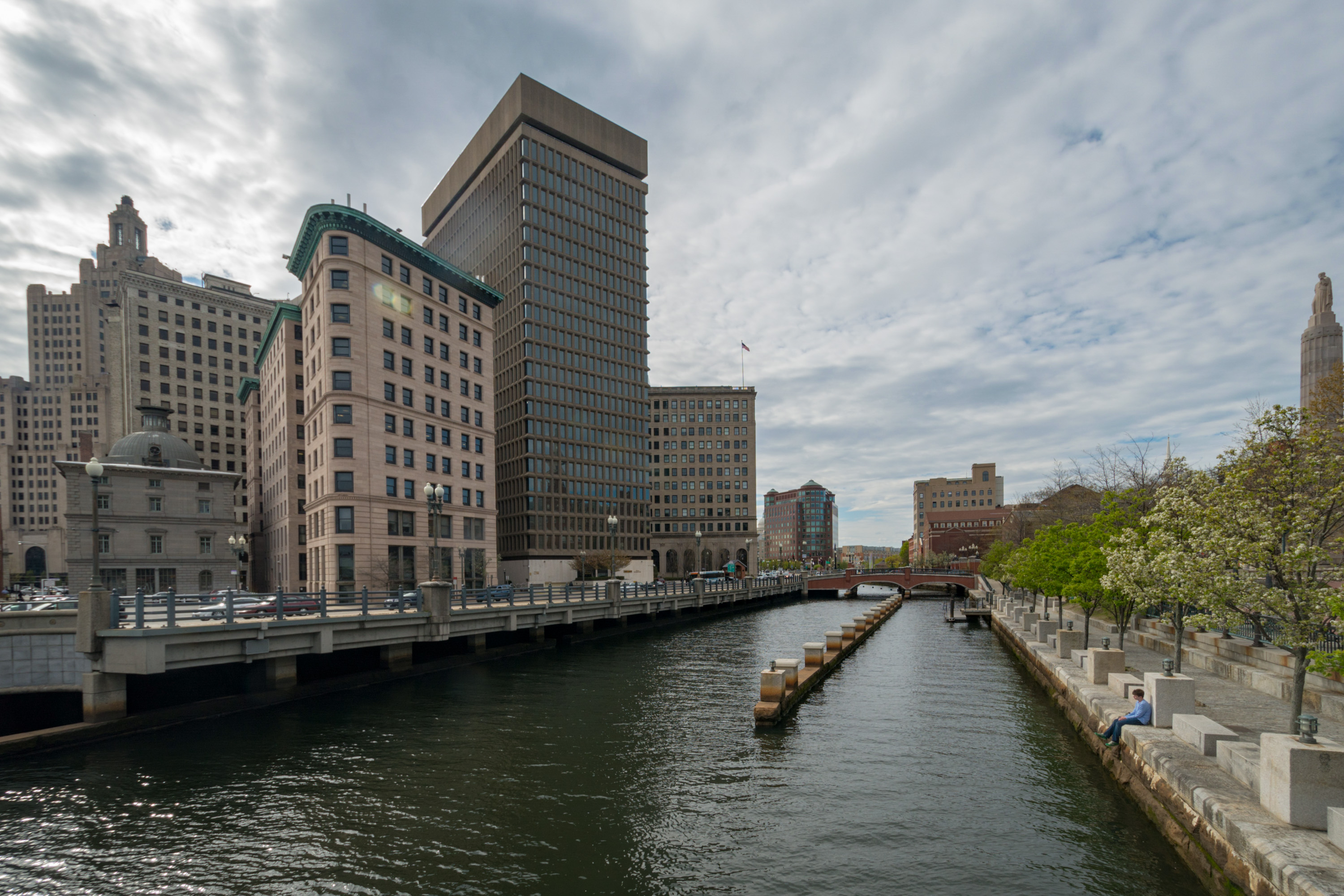
- The Providence River and Downtown Providence in April 2016

Location
- Country: United States
- State: Rhode Island
- County: Providence

Physical characteristics
- Source
  - location: confluence of Woonasquatucket and Moshassuck rivers
  - coordinates: 41.8267°N 71.4100°W
- Mouth
  - location: Narragansett Bay
  - coordinates: 41.721°N 71.348°W
- Length: 8 mi (13 km)

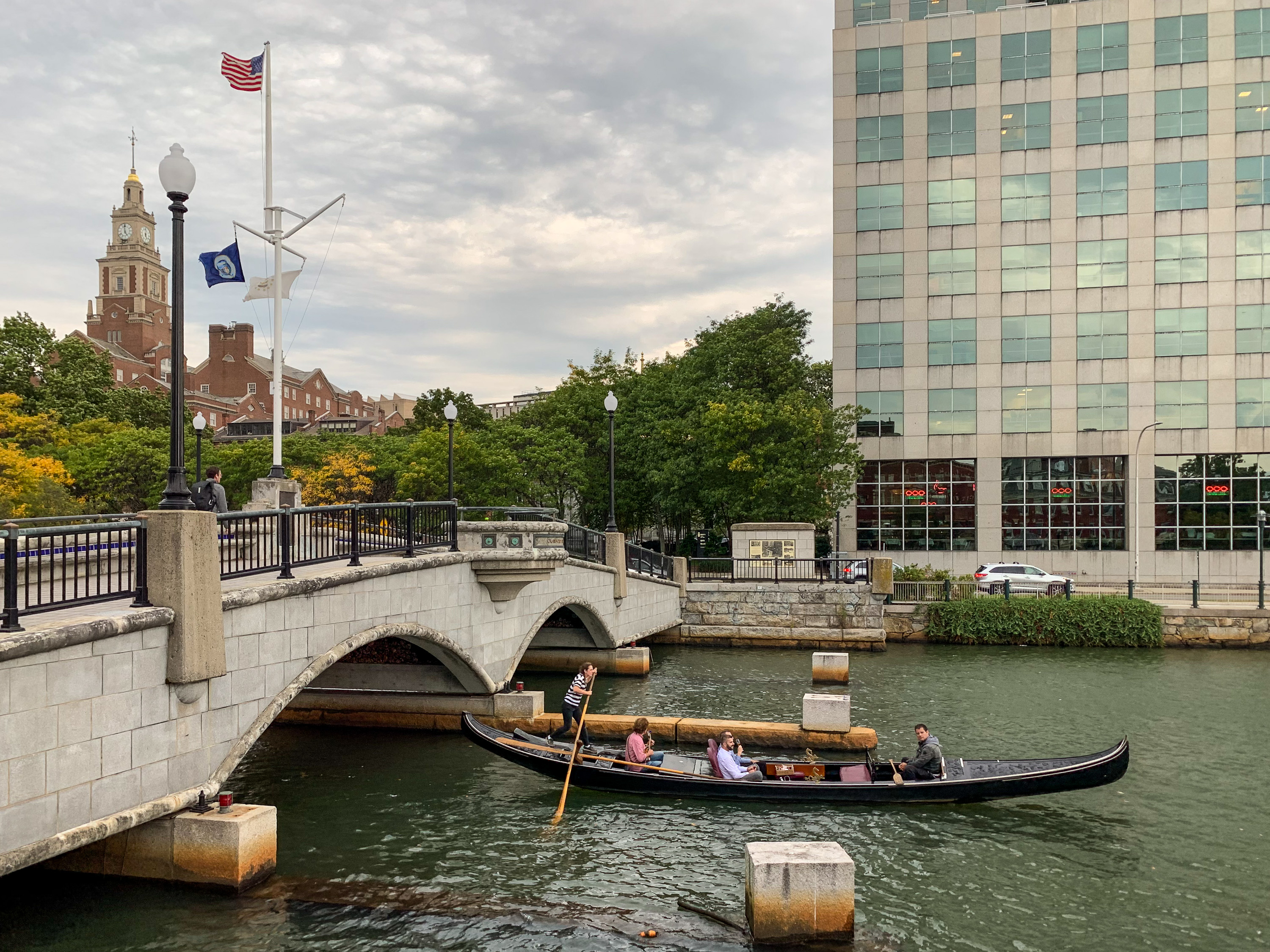
A gondola sails under the Crawford Street Bridge

The Providence River is a tidal river in the U.S. state of Rhode Island. It flows approximately 8 miles (13 km). There are no dams along the river's length, although the Fox Point Hurricane Barrier is located south of downtown to protect the city of Providence from damaging tidal floods.

The southern part of the river has been dredged at a cost of $65 million in federal and state funds to benefit nearby marinas and commercial shipping interests.

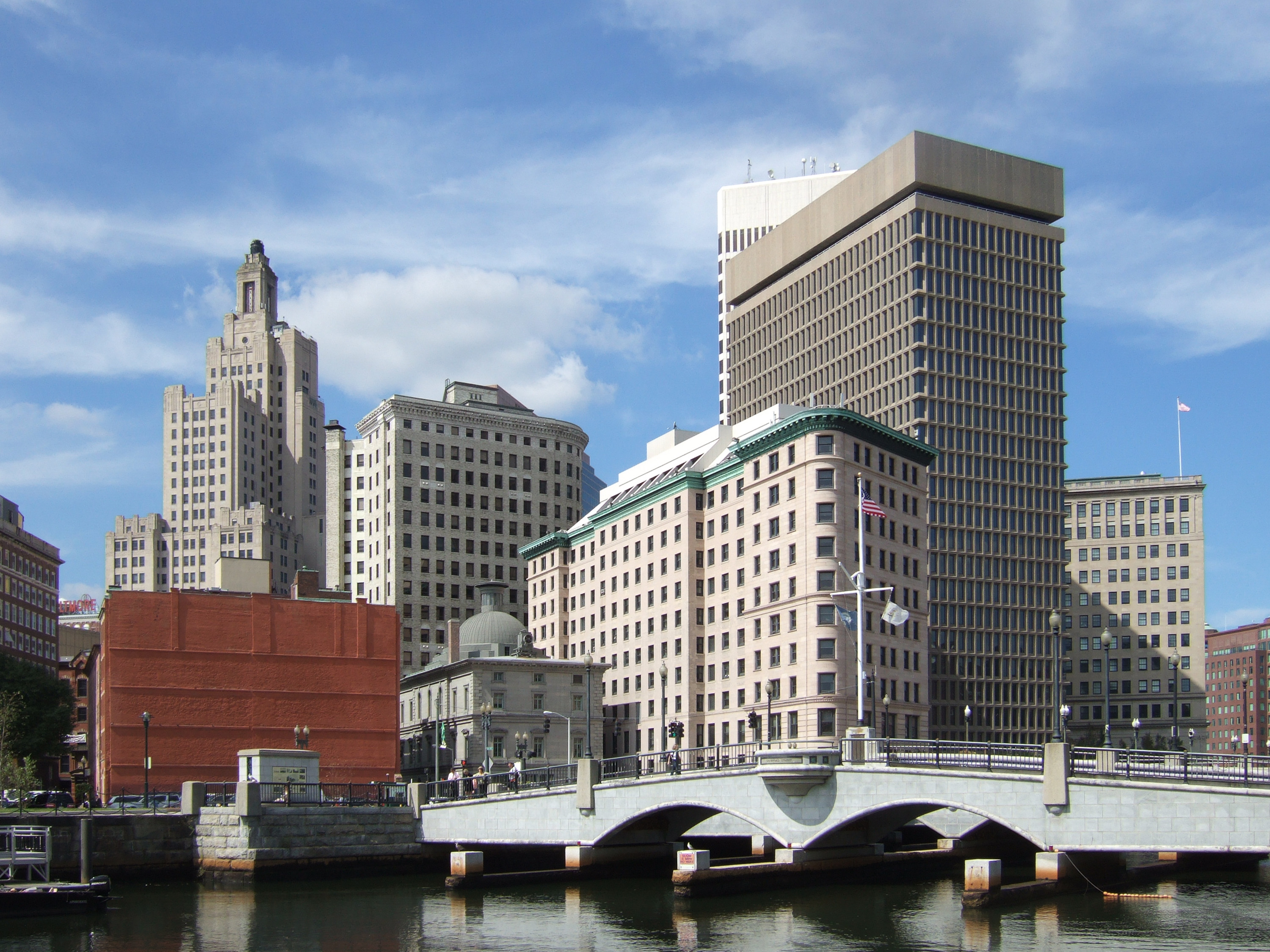
The Crawford Street Bridge extends over the Providence River, connecting Downtown Providence to the East Side

The Dutch called the Providence River the Nassau River. It was the northeastern limit of Dutch claims in the colonial era, owing to Adriaen Block's exploration of Narragansett Bay, from 1614 until the Hartford Treaty of 1650. It can, therefore, be regarded as the original boundary between the English New England colonies and the Dutch colony of New Netherland.

== Course ==
The river is formed by the confluence of the Woonasquatucket and Moshassuck rivers in downtown Providence. One half mile downstream, it is joined from the east by the Seekonk River and continues south. The cities of Providence, Cranston, and Warwick lie to the west of the river, while the city of East Providence and the town of Barrington lie to the east. At the narrows between Conimicut Point, in Warwick to the west and Nayatt Point in Barrington to the east, the Conimicut Shoal Lighthouse marks the entrance to the river from Narragansett Bay.

== Recreation ==
Since the late 1990s, the Providence River has been known for gondola rides, which can be enjoyed by tourists and locals daily in season. Providence's three gondolas and one sandolo are hand made in Italy

== Crossings ==
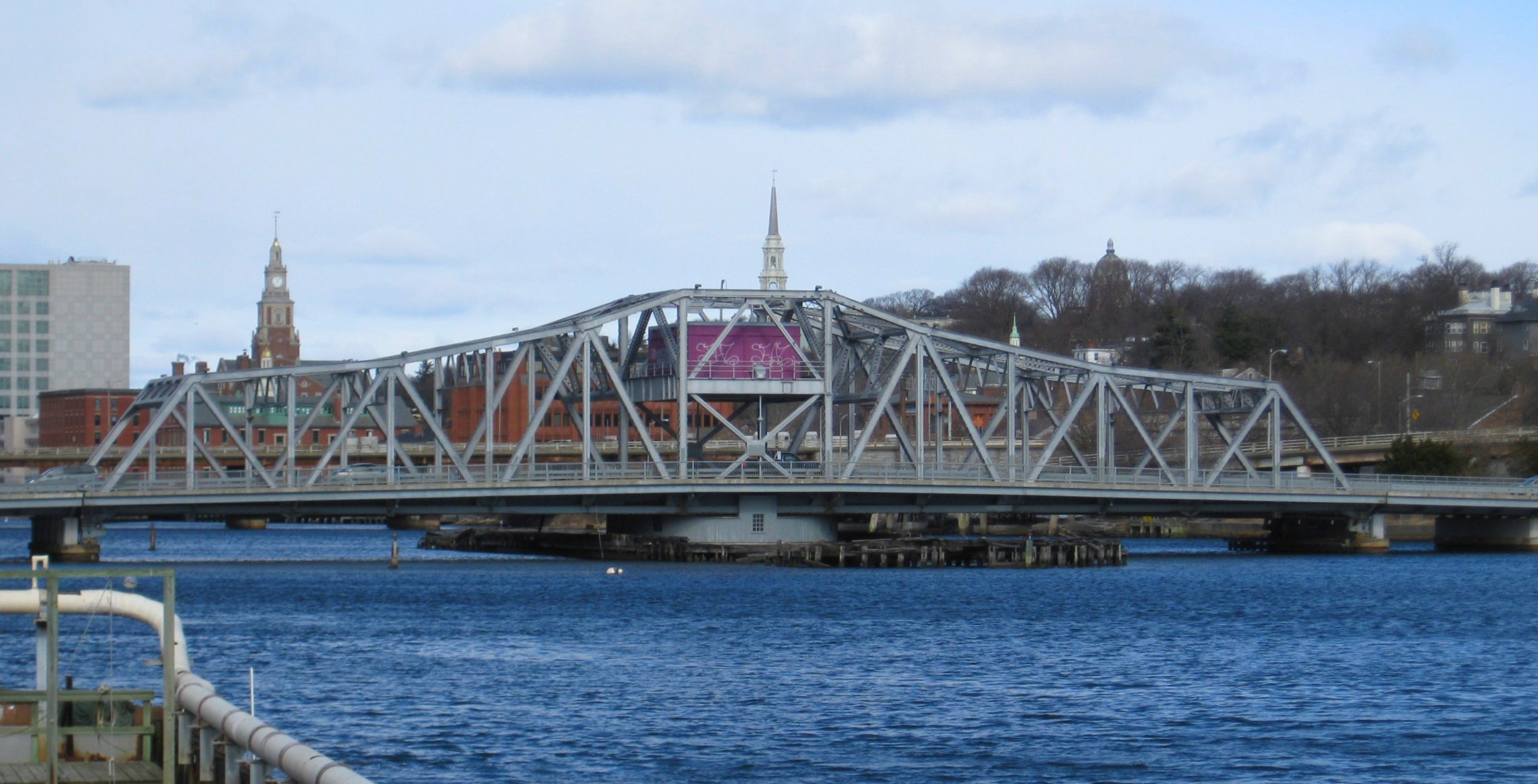
The Point Street Bridge spans the Providence River

Below is a list of all crossings over the Providence River. The list starts at the headwaters and goes downstream.

- Providence
  - Washington Place
  - College Street
  - Crawford Street
  - Old Interstate 195
  - Michael S. Van Leesten Memorial Bridge
  - Point Street Bridge
  - Fox Point Hurricane Barrier
  - Providence River Bridge (I-195)

== Tributaries ==
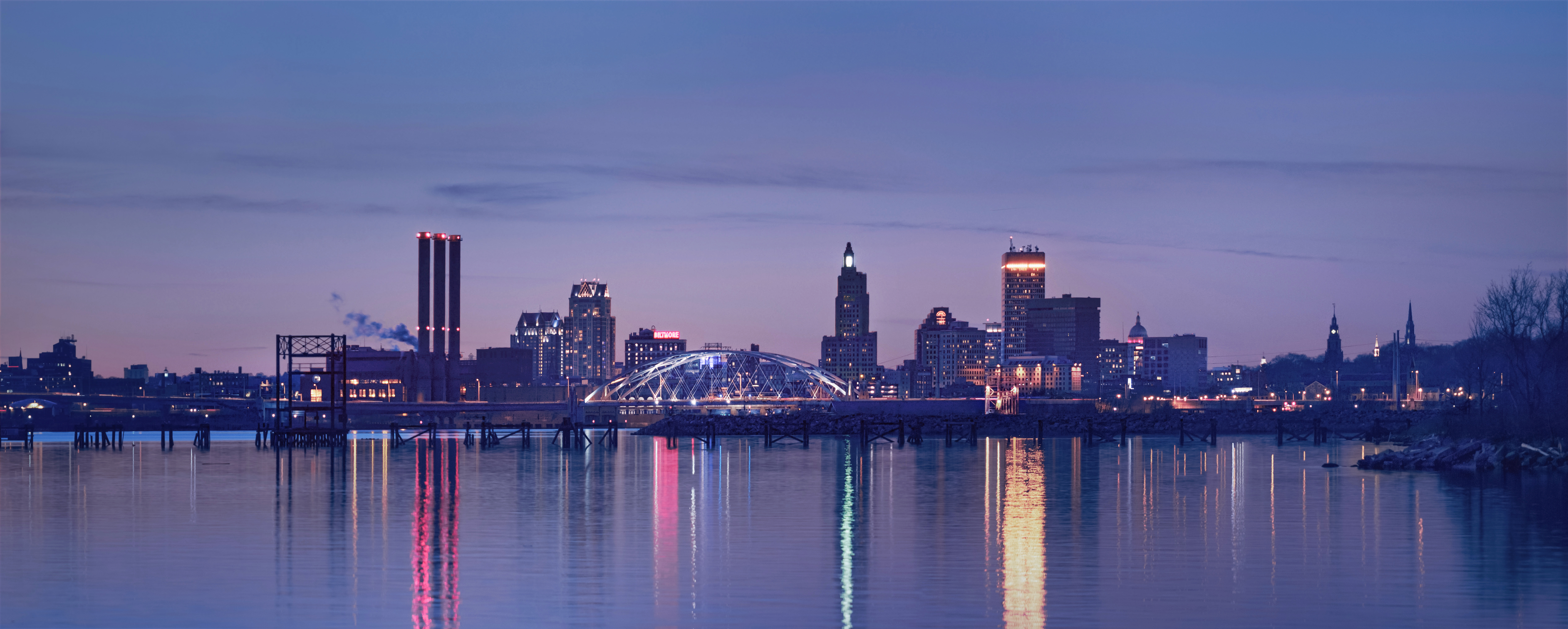
The skyline of the city of Providence viewed from across the Providence River

- Seekonk River
- Pawtuxet River
- Moshassuck River
- Woonasquatucket River

== See also ==
- Green Jacket Shoal
- List of rivers in Rhode Island
- Warren River
- Maps from the United States Geological Survey
