= Providence Jewelry Manufacturing Historic District =

Historic district in Rhode Island, United States

- U.S. National Register of Historic Places
- U.S. Historic district
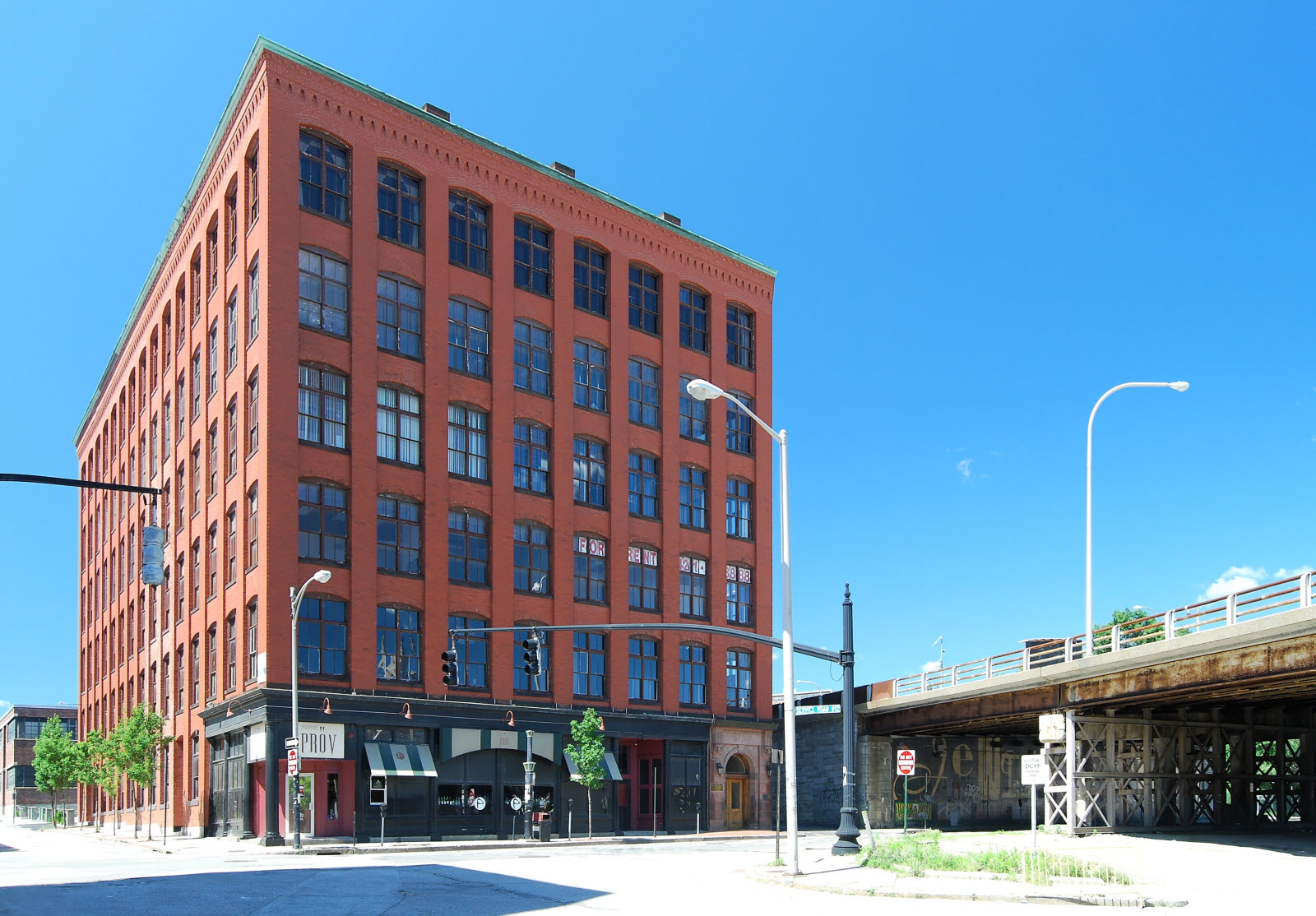

- Location within Rhode Island Location within the United States
- Location: Providence, Rhode Island
- Area: 19.3 acres (7.8 ha)
- Built: 1844
- Architect: Multiple
- Architectural style: Greek Revival, Federal
- NRHP reference No.: 85003088 (original); 12000136 (increase)

Significant dates
- Added to NRHP: December 5, 1985
- Boundary increase: March 20, 2012

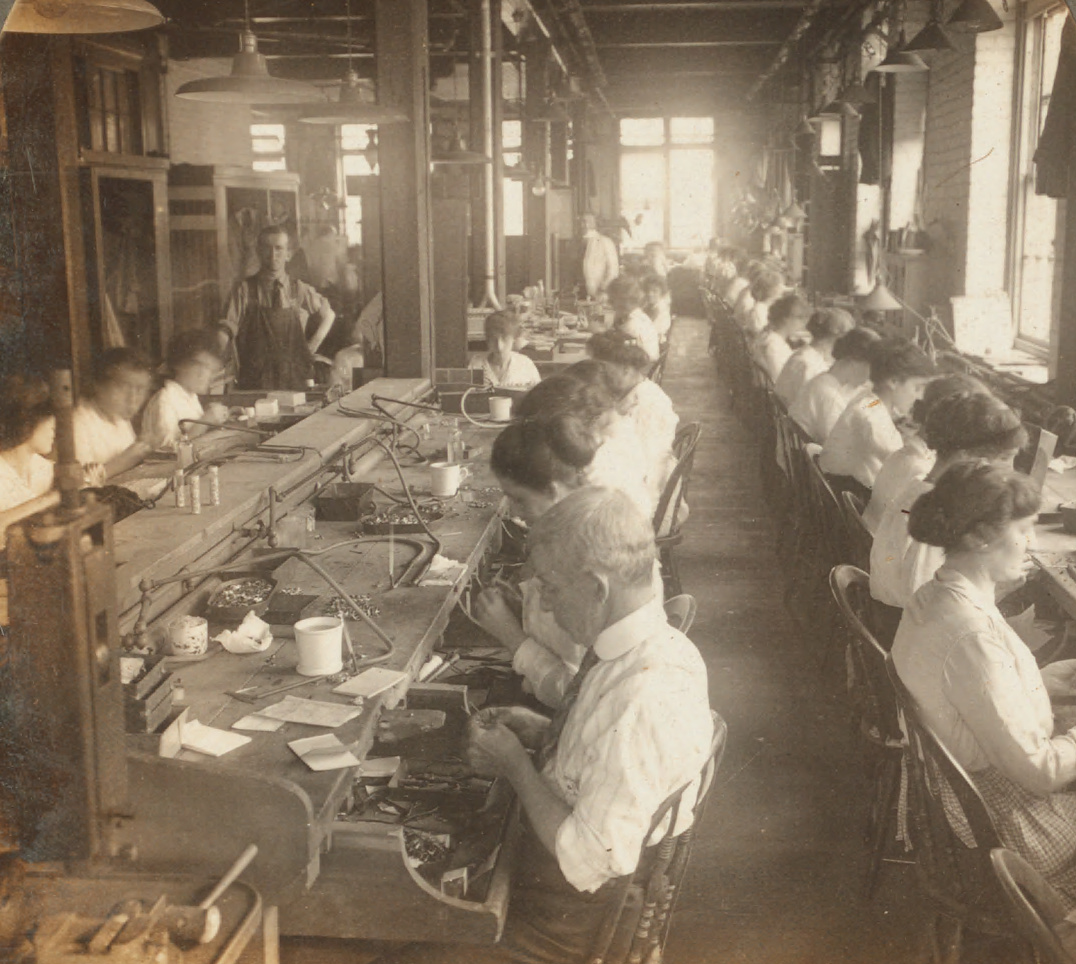
Workers made jewelry by hand at various factories in the area

The Providence Jewelry Manufacturing Historic District is a predominantly industrial historic district in Providence, Rhode Island. It covers a roughly 19-acre (7.7 ha) area in the city's Jewelry District, just south of Downtown Providence. While the area began as a residential neighborhood, it emerged in the late 19th and early 20th centuries as a center of Providence's jewelry manufacturing businesses. The oldest industrial building in the district is the 1848 Elm Street Machine Shop (116 Elm Street), a 2 1/2-story stone structure that now houses offices of Brown University.

The district has an irregular L shape, reflecting a since rerouted portion of Interstate 195. The main north-south section of the district includes properties on Hospital and Imperial Streets between Davol Point Street and Bassett Street, while the east-west section extends along Bassett and Clifford Streets to Chestnut, and then extends further along Ship Street to Eddy. It includes 21 factory buildings, five shops or garages, and three residences.

The district was listed on the National Register of Historic Places in 1985, and expanded by the inclusion of several buildings in 2012.

== Gallery ==
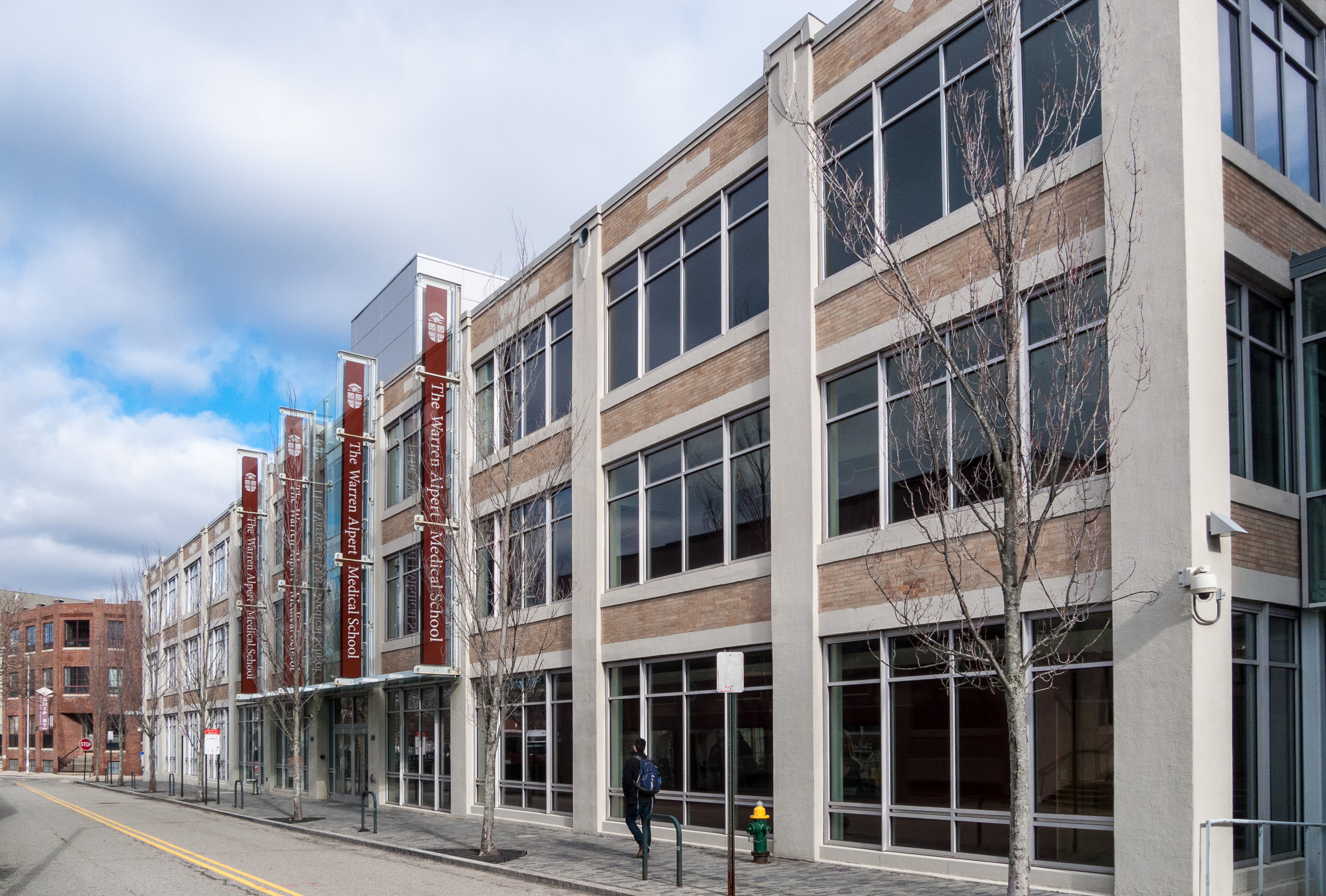
Little Nemo Building (Frank S. Perry, 1928), now part of Brown's Alpert Medical School

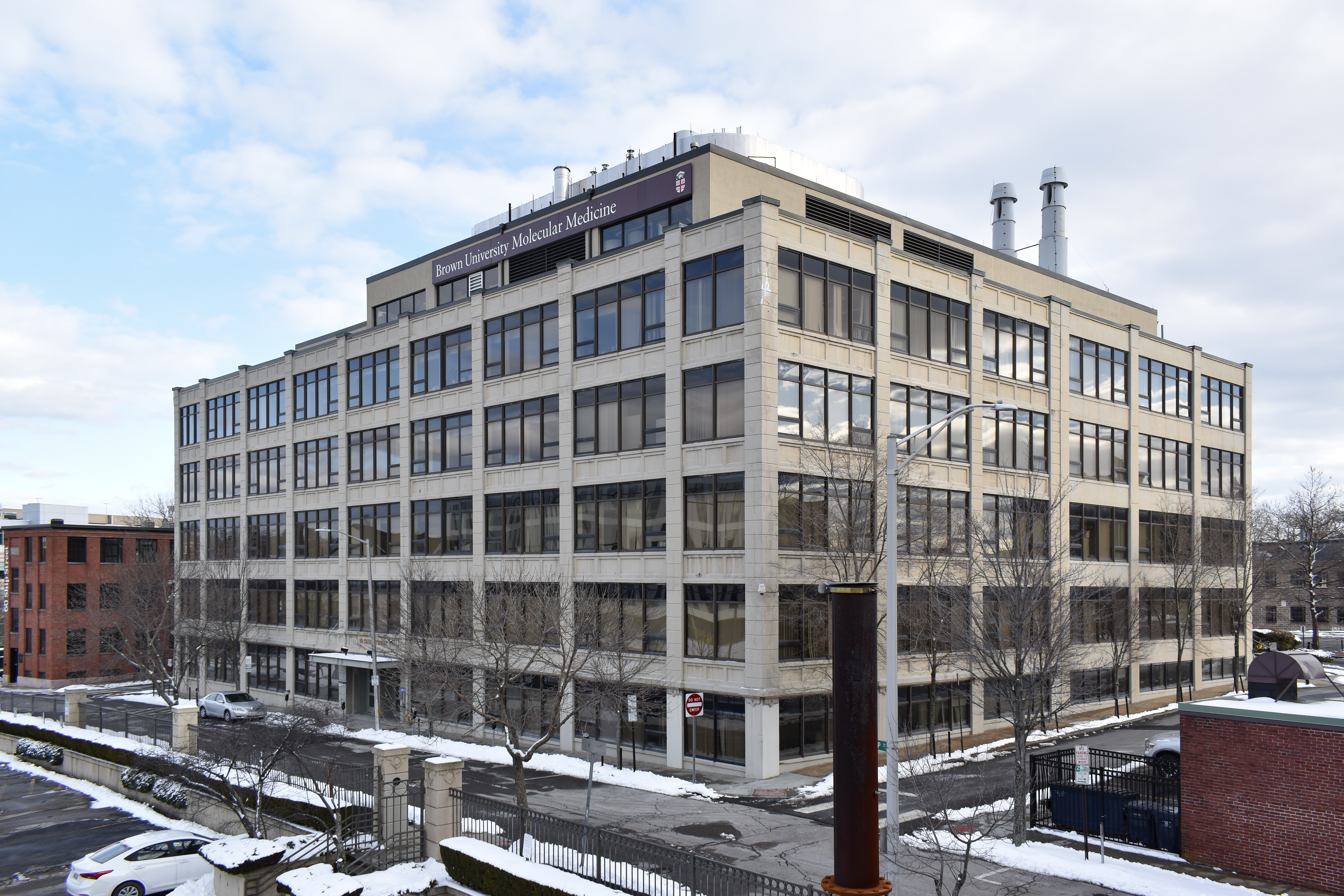
Doran-Speidel Building (1912), now used by Brown University

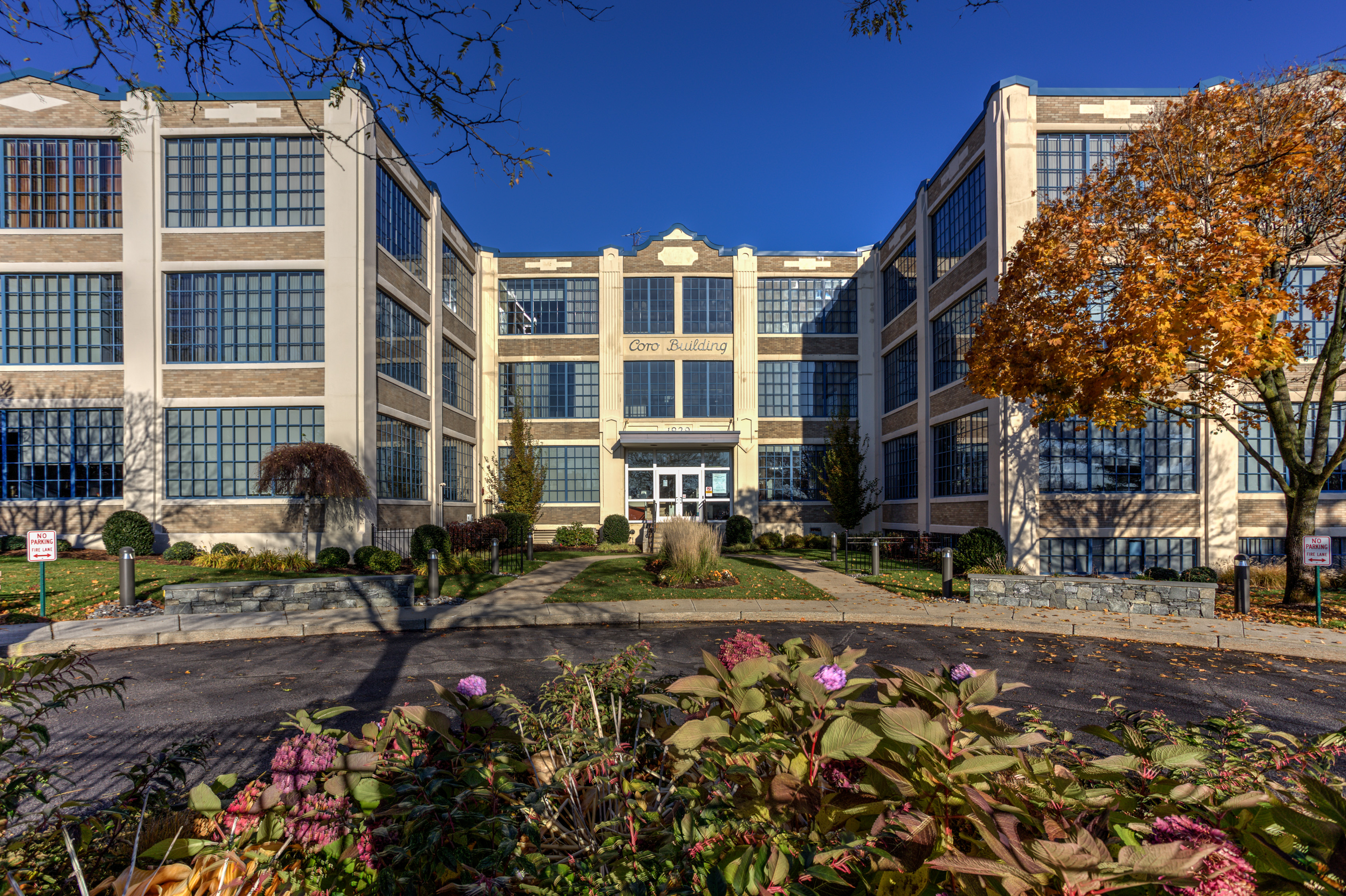
Coro Building (Frank S. Perry, 1929), built for the Cohn & Rosenburger Jewelry Company, now houses Lifespan labs and offices

== See also ==
- National Register of Historic Places listings in Providence, Rhode Island
