= South Street Station (Rhode Island) =

- South Street Landing
- U.S. National Register of Historic Places
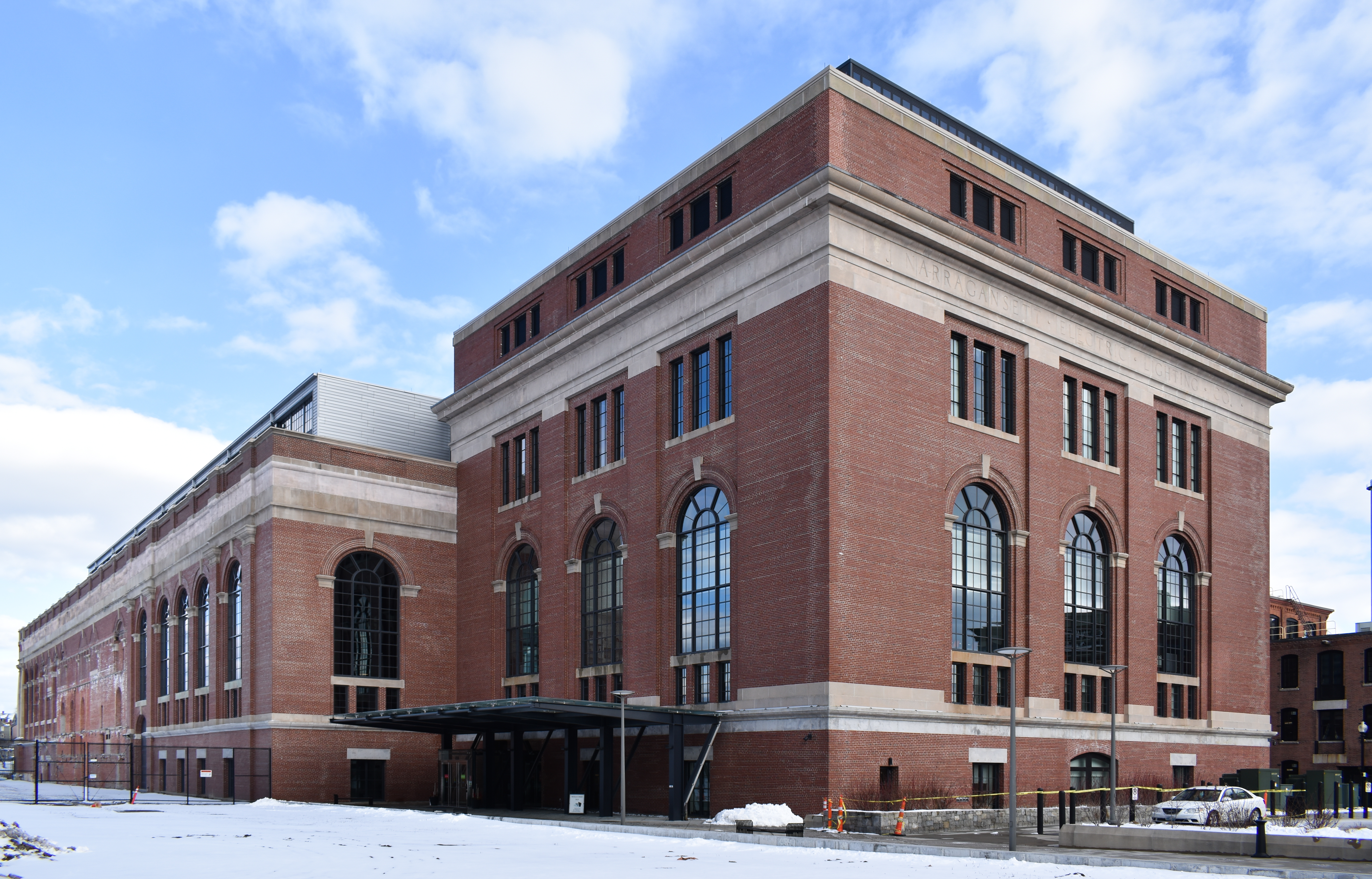
- South Street Landing in 2021

- Location within Rhode Island Location within the United States
- Location: 360 Eddy Street; Providence, Rhode Island
- Coordinates: 41°49′7″N 71°24′24″W
- Area: 2 acres (0.81 ha)
- Built: 1912
- Architect: Jenks & Ballou
- Architectural style: Classical Revival
- NRHP reference No.: 06000553
- Added to NRHP: June 30, 2006

The South Street Station (formerly known as The Narragansett Electric Company Power Station or Narragansett Electric Lighting Company Power Station and rebranded in 2017 as South Street Landing) is an historic electrical power generation station at 360 Eddy Street in Providence, Rhode Island. The structure has since been redeveloped and is now used as an administrative office and academic facility by a number of local universities.

== History ==
The structure is a massive brick and stone building, constructed in stages between 1912 and 1952. Despite its phased construction, the 58,000-square-foot (5,400 m^{2}) building has fairly consistent Classical Revival styling. The building, an excellent example of early 20th-century power plant design, burned coal to provide electrical power to the city. It was gradually taken over by the more modern Manchester Street Station and was decommissioned in 1995.

=== Redevelopment ===
Following the station's decommissioning, the Rhode Island Historical Society planned to convert the building into a museum. As planned, the Heritage Harbor Museum would have been a Smithsonian Affiliate museum devoted to Rhode Island's history and culture. Construction began in 2007 on a combined museum and hotel, but the project was cancelled in 2009 due to lack of funding. The building sat vacant and decaying for many years.

In 2014, Boston developer CV Properties began redeveloping the structure for use by Brown University, Rhode Island College, and University of Rhode Island. The project cost an estimated $220 million and received roughly $27 million and $22 million in state and federal tax credits. The project was completed in 2017. The property was purchased by Chicago–based real investment trust Ventas later that year.

River House—an adjacent 270-bed housing complex—opened in the summer of 2019. In October 2019, the station received the Richard H. Driehaus Foundation National Preservation Award, which recognizes preservation and adaptive reuse projects.

== Gallery ==
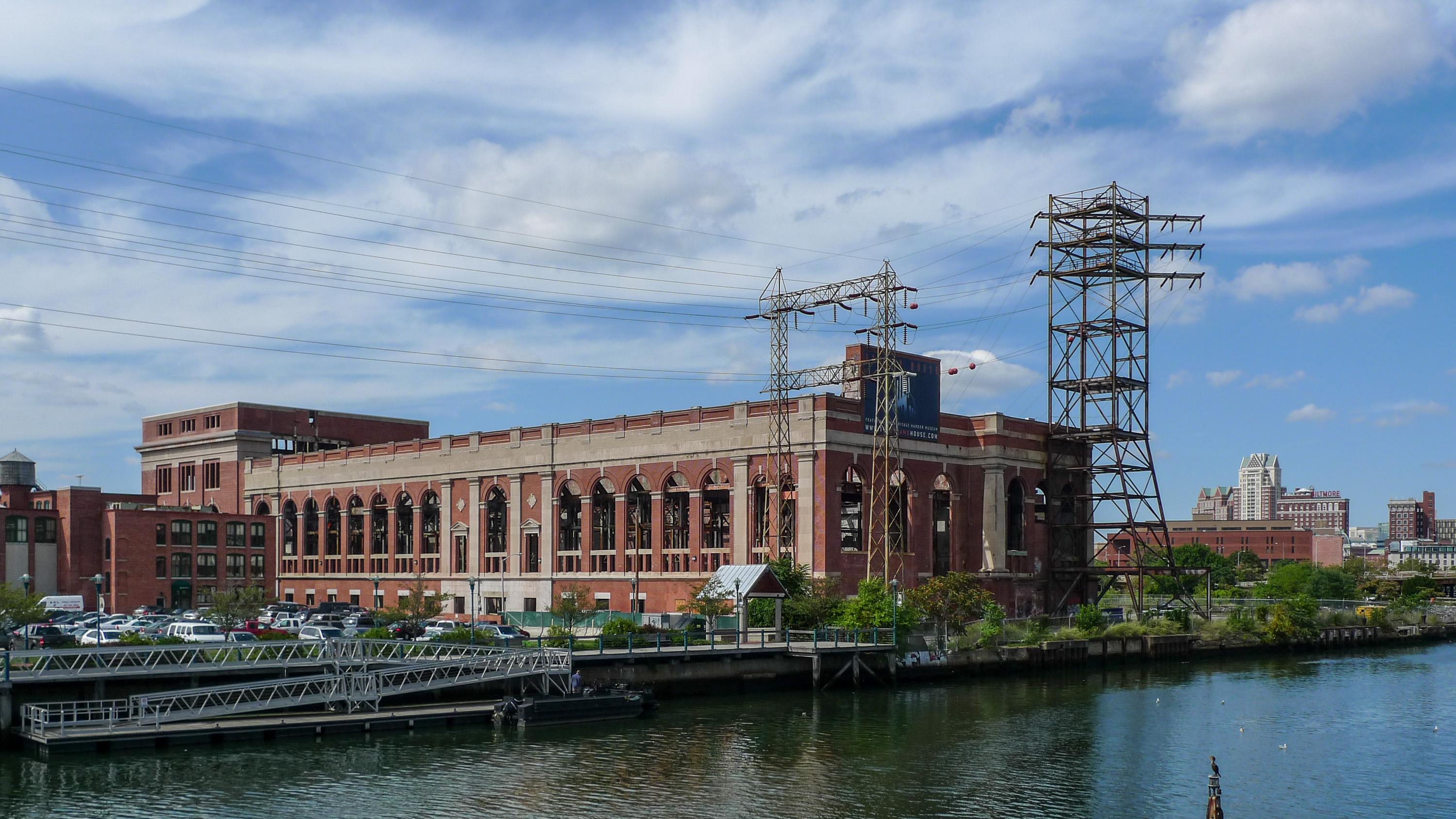
The building in 2008

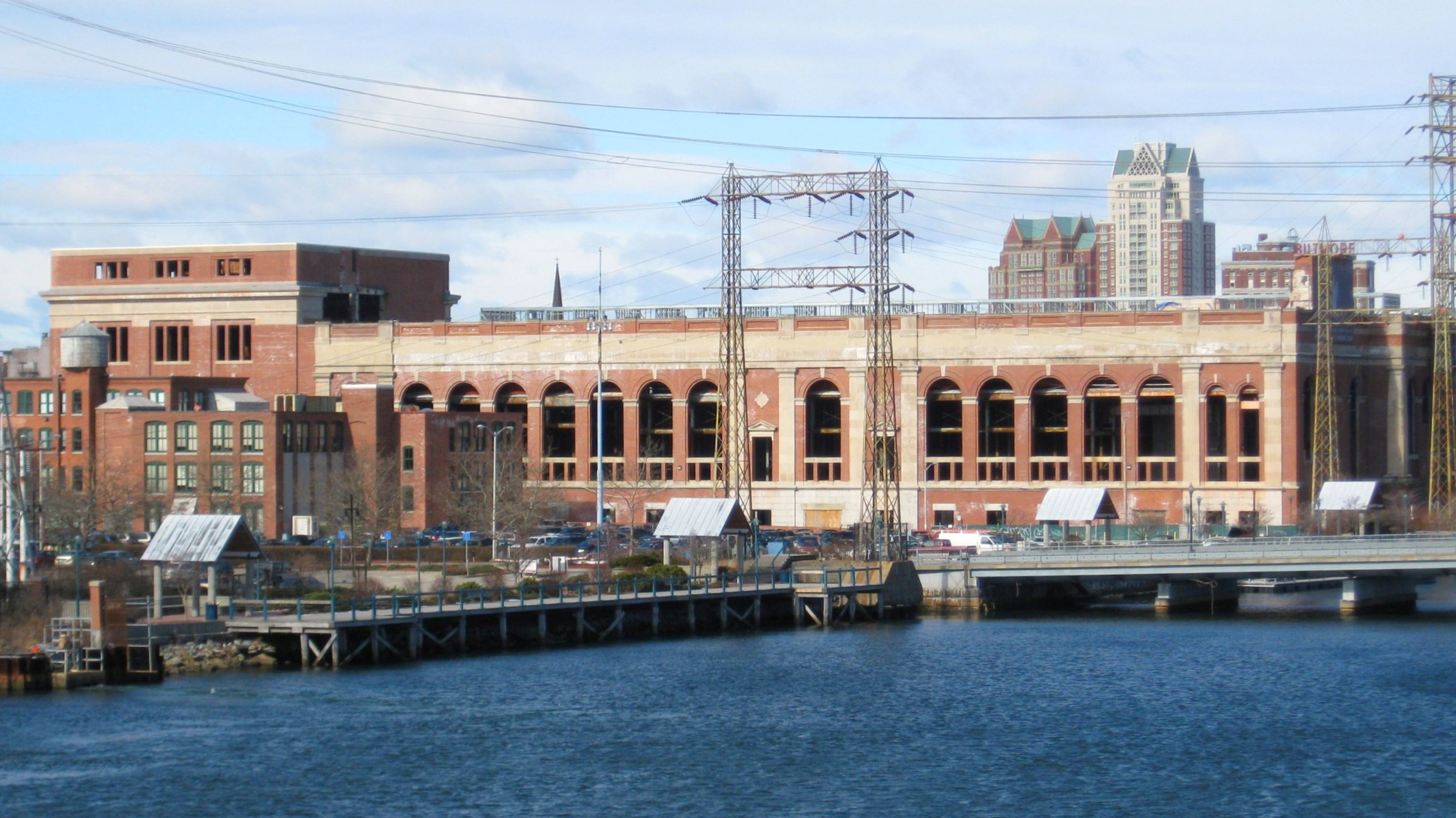
The building in 2010

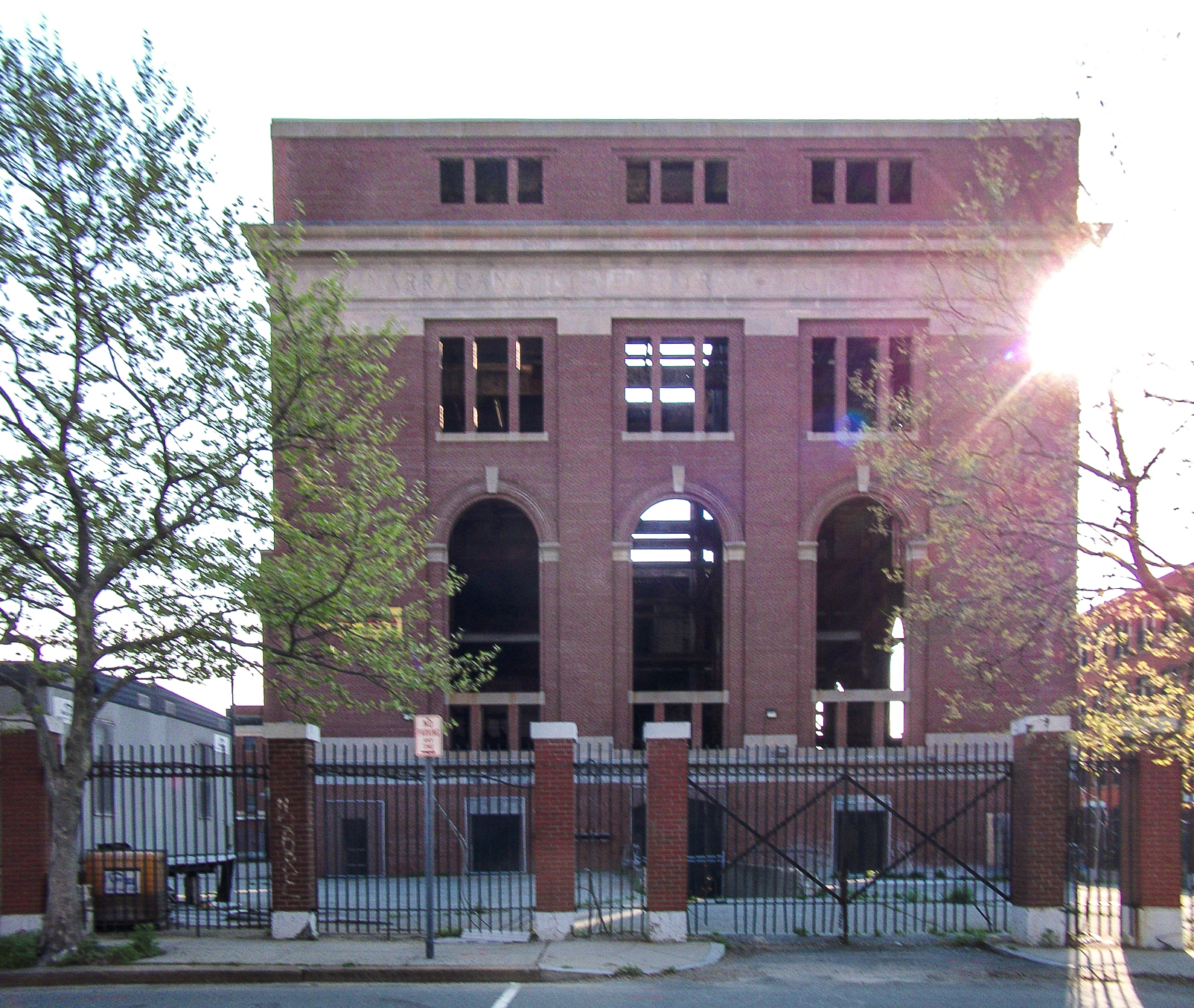
A 2011 view showing the hollow structure

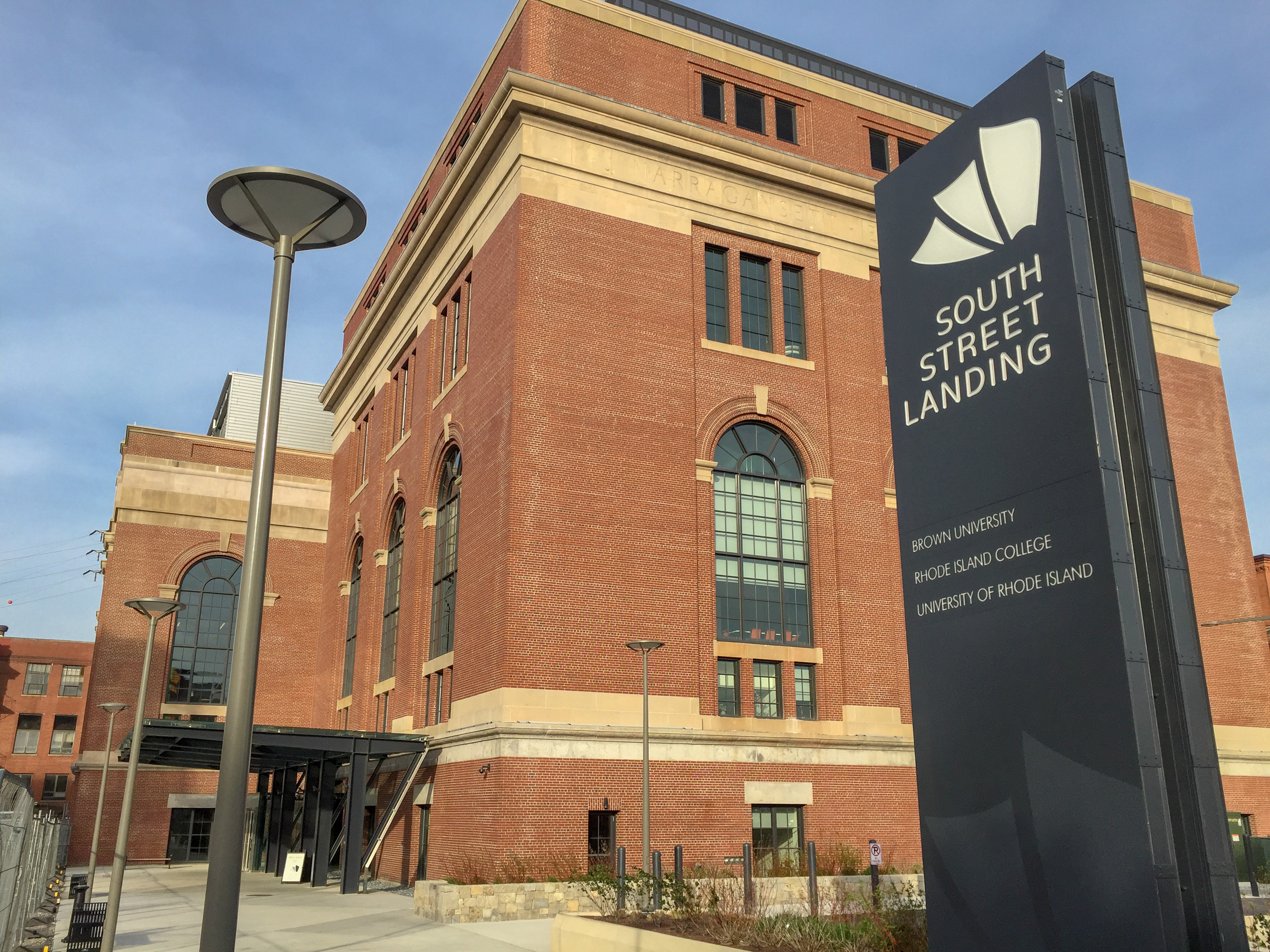
The building in 2018, shortly after its renovation

== See also ==
- National Register of Historic Places listings in Providence, Rhode Island
