= Downtown, Providence, Rhode Island =

- Downtown Providence Historic District
- U.S. National Register of Historic Places
- U.S. Historic district
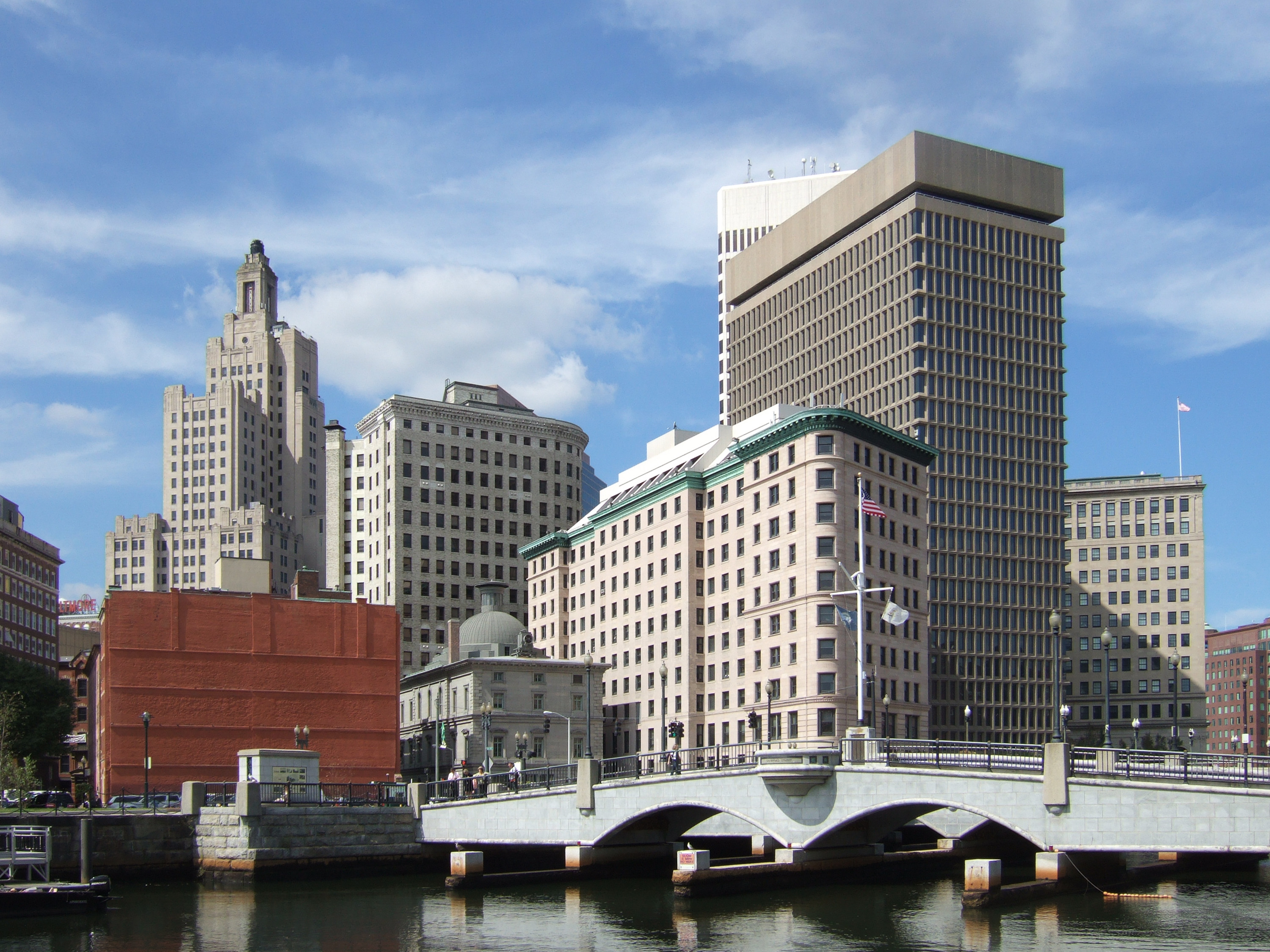

- Location within Providence Location within Rhode Island Location within the United States
- Location: Providence, Rhode Island
- Coordinates: 41.82°N 71.41°W
- Area: 90 acres (36 ha)
- Built: 1800
- Architectural style: Late 19th and early 20th century American movements, late Victorian
- NRHP reference No.: 84001967 (original); 07001081 (increase 1); 12000438 (increase 2)

Significant dates
- Added to NRHP: February 10, 1984
- Boundary increases: October 11, 2007; July 25, 2012

Location of Downtown Providence within Providence

Downtown is the central economic, political, and cultural district of the city of Providence, Rhode Island, United States. It is bounded on the east by Canal Street and the Providence River, to the north by Smith Street, to the west by Interstate 95, and to the south by Henderson Street. The highway serves as a physical barrier between the city's commercial core and neighborhoods of Federal Hill, West End, and Upper South Providence. Most of the downtown is listed on the National Register of Historic Places as the Downtown Providence Historic District.

== History ==
Originally known as "Weybossett Neck" or "Weybossett Side", Downtown was first settled by religious dissidents from the First Congregational Society in 1746. Their settlement was located near present-day Westminster Street.

Downtown did not witness substantial development until the early 19th century, when Providence began to compete with Newport, Rhode Island. British forces had destroyed much of Newport during the American War for Independence, making that city's merchants vulnerable to competition from Providence. This prevented the development of a commercial district along the western bank of the Providence River.

=== Interstate highways ===
Starting in 1956, construction began on both Interstate 195 and Interstate 95. The routes of these two large highways took them directly through several established Providence neighborhoods. Over the next several years, hundreds of homes and businesses and two churches were demolished. The highways isolated Downtown from the South Providence, West End, Federal Hill, and Smith Hill neighborhoods, leaving the city divided.

=== Decline: 1960s and 1970s ===
Providence's population declined from a peak of 253,504 in 1940 to only 179,213 in 1970. The white middle class moved away from the city center, and businesses followed. A downtown address no longer conveyed prestige. By 1970, downtown was widely seen as a dangerous place to be after dark, lacked sufficient parking, and most shopping and movie-going moved to the suburbs. A 1961 master plan called Downtown 1970 recommended massive bulldozing of properties. As hotels and stores were abandoned, Johnson and Wales University purchased many of the vacant properties.

In 1964, Westminster Street was converted to the pedestrianized "Westminster Mall", in an attempt to create a pleasant shopping environment downtown. However, this project was unable to attract shoppers away from the new suburban Midland Mall (1968) and Warwick Mall (1972). Within a decade, all the street's major department stores had closed except Woolworth's, and in 1989 the pedestrian mall was torn up, and the street was returned to vehicular traffic.

=== Remaking downtown ===
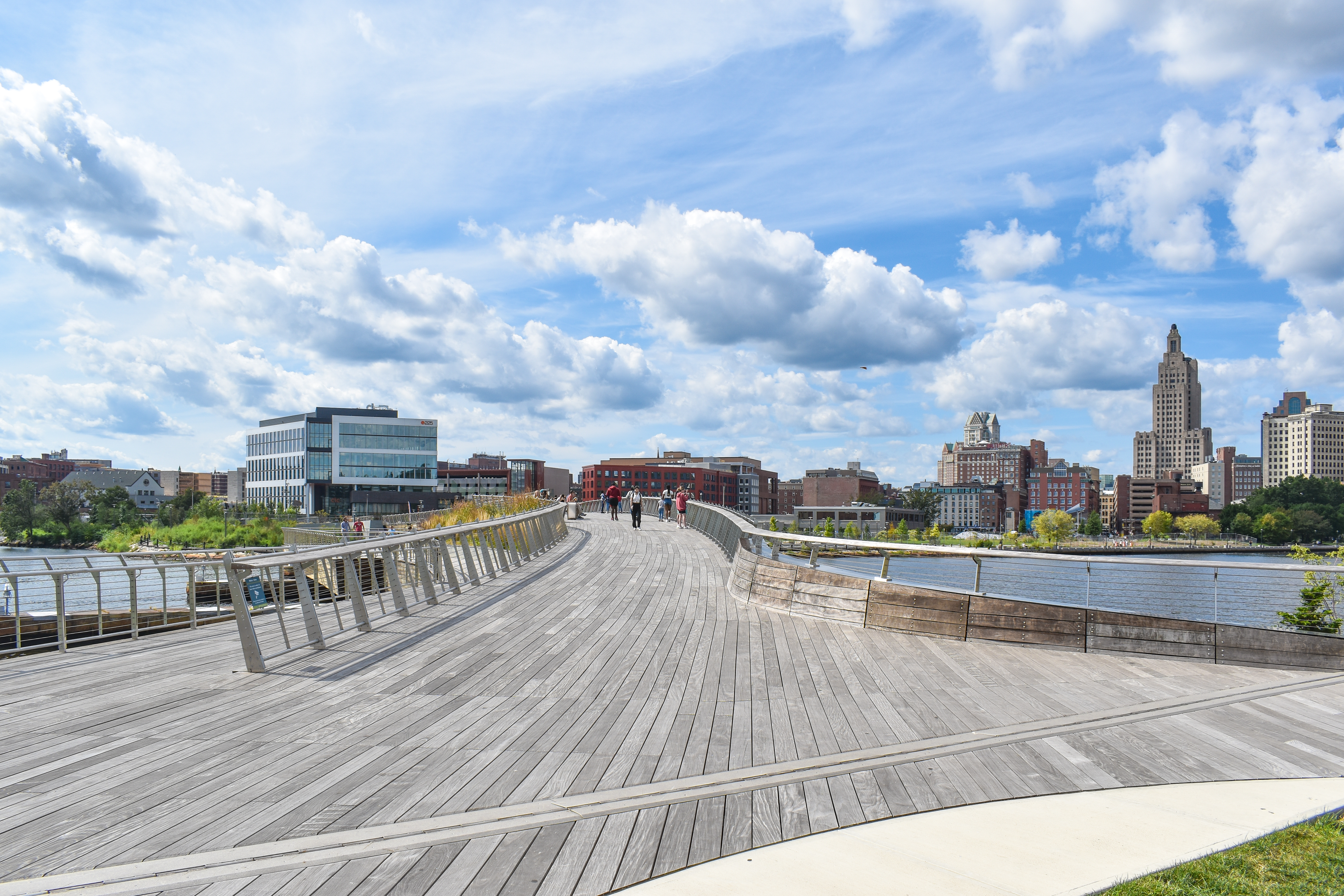
The Michael S. Van Leesten Memorial Bridge opened in summer 2019

During the industrialization of the late 19th century, an ever-expanding railroad industry emanated from Union Station, eventually resulting in the complete paving over of the Great Salt Cove and the two branches of the Providence River. The result of decades of expansion was the isolation of the state Capitol from the rest of downtown by an imposing mass of railroad tracks, often locally referred to as the "Chinese Wall". As rail traffic dropped off 75 percent by 1980, city planners saw an opportunity to open up central land for development and re-unify downtown with the Capitol. A new, smaller train station was built in 1986, located 0.5 miles (0.80 km) north of its predecessor, and tracks were removed or routed underground.

The new land precipitated a massive remaking of the character of the city's downtown. From 1975 until 1982, under Mayor Vincent Cianci, Jr, $606 million of local and national Community Development funds were invested. Roads were removed and the city's natural rivers were opened up and lined with a cobblestone-paved park called Waterplace Park in 1994, which became host to popular WaterFire festivals. Private and public developments followed, and the new area adjacent to the Capitol became known as "Capitol Center".

Ushered in by the construction of the new train station (1986), development brought new buildings: The Gateway Building (1990), One Citizens Plaza (1991), Center Place (1992), a Westin hotel and Providence Convention Center (1993), Providence Place Mall (1999), Courtyard Marriott (2000), GTECH headquarters (2006), The Residences at the Westin (2007), Waterplace Towers condominiums (2007), and Capitol Cove still under construction.

In 2007, the Renaissance Providence Hotel opened in the Masonic Temple building, which had been abandoned amidst the Great Depression a half century prior.

The relocation of Interstate 195 (the "Iway" project) in the early 2000s sparked another boom of construction in the 2010s, including the Michael S. Van Leesten Memorial Bridge, which spans the Providence River, and the Point 225 building in 2019 (aka "Wexford Innovation Center"), designed by Ayers Saint Gross, and a riverfront park. As of September 2020, several other buildings in the area are under construction or proposed.

== Demographics ==
For census purposes, the Census Bureau classifies Downtown as part of the Census Tract 8. This neighborhood had 4,931 inhabitants based on data from the 2020 United States Census.

The racial makeup of the neighborhood was 53.8% (2,655) White (Non-Hispanic), 7.7% ( 379 ) Black (Non-Hispanic), 19.4% (955) Asian, 2.8% (139) from some other race or from two or more races. Hispanic or Latino of any race were 16.3% (803) of the population. 27.5% are foreign born, with most foreign born residents originating from Asia (51%).

The median age in this area is 30.5 years old. Family Households made up 32% of the population, and the average household (family and non-family) had 1.4 persons living there. 21% of the population was married. Out of the 2,795 vacant and non-vacant housing units, 12% were owner occupied, and 88% renter occupied. The average house was worth $536,200, which is higher than the average in Providence. 22.5% of residents are below the poverty line.

== Government ==
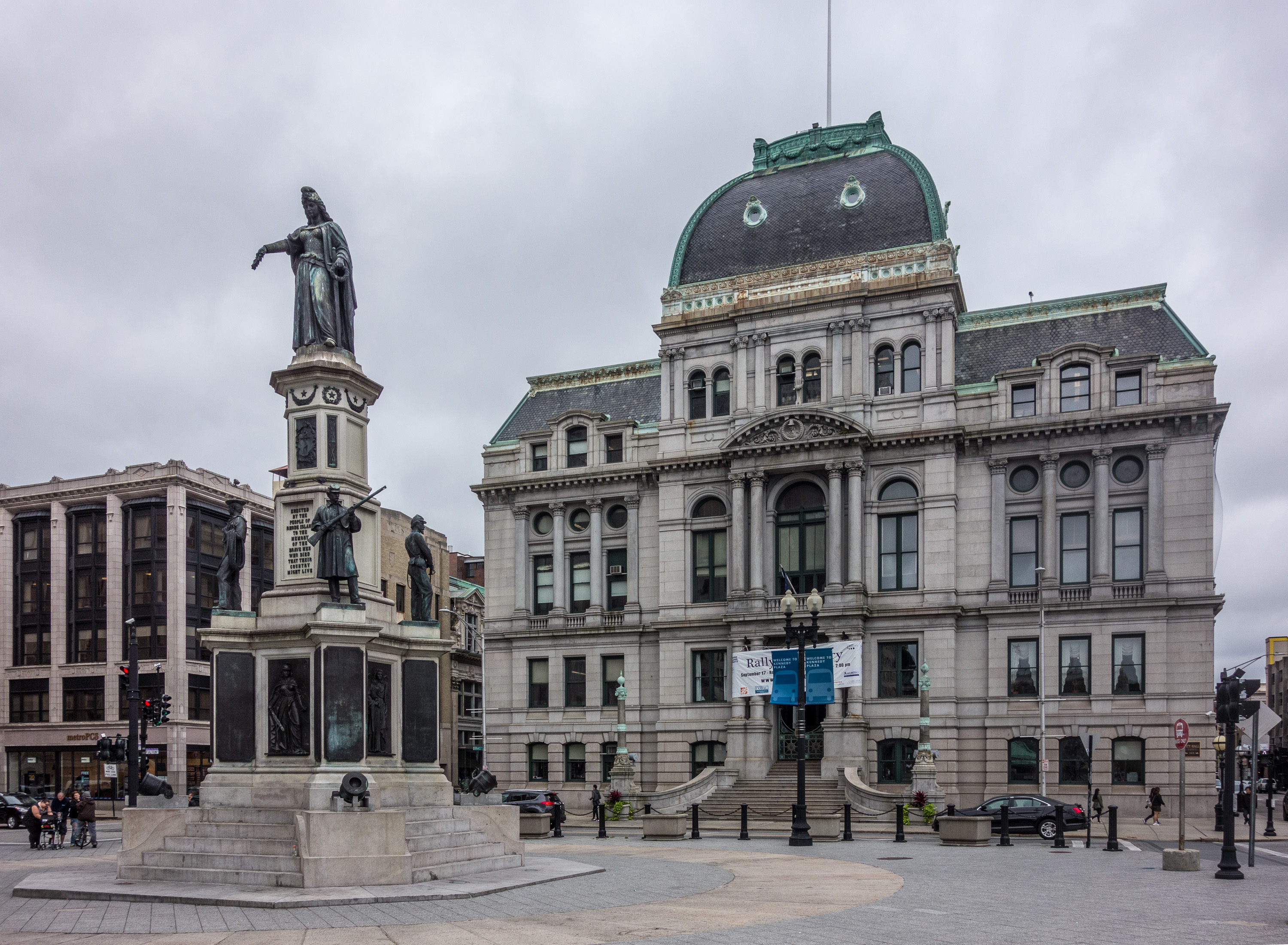
Providence City Hall

From north to south, Downtown includes portions of Wards 12, 13, 11, which are represented in the Providence City Council by Kat Kerwin, John J. Lombardi, and Balbina A. Young. All three councilors are Democrats.

Providence City Hall is located at 25 Dorrance Street, at the corner of Dorrance and Washington Street. It is immediately next to Kennedy Plaza and the Biltmore Hotel. It houses the City Council, the Mayor's Office, and the offices of some municipal agencies.

The Rhode Island State House is located on Smith Street at the northern edge of Downtown. It includes the chambers of the Rhode Island General Assembly and the Governor's Office.

The Rhode Island Department of Education is headquartered in the Shepard Company Building at 255 Westminster Street.

== Universities ==
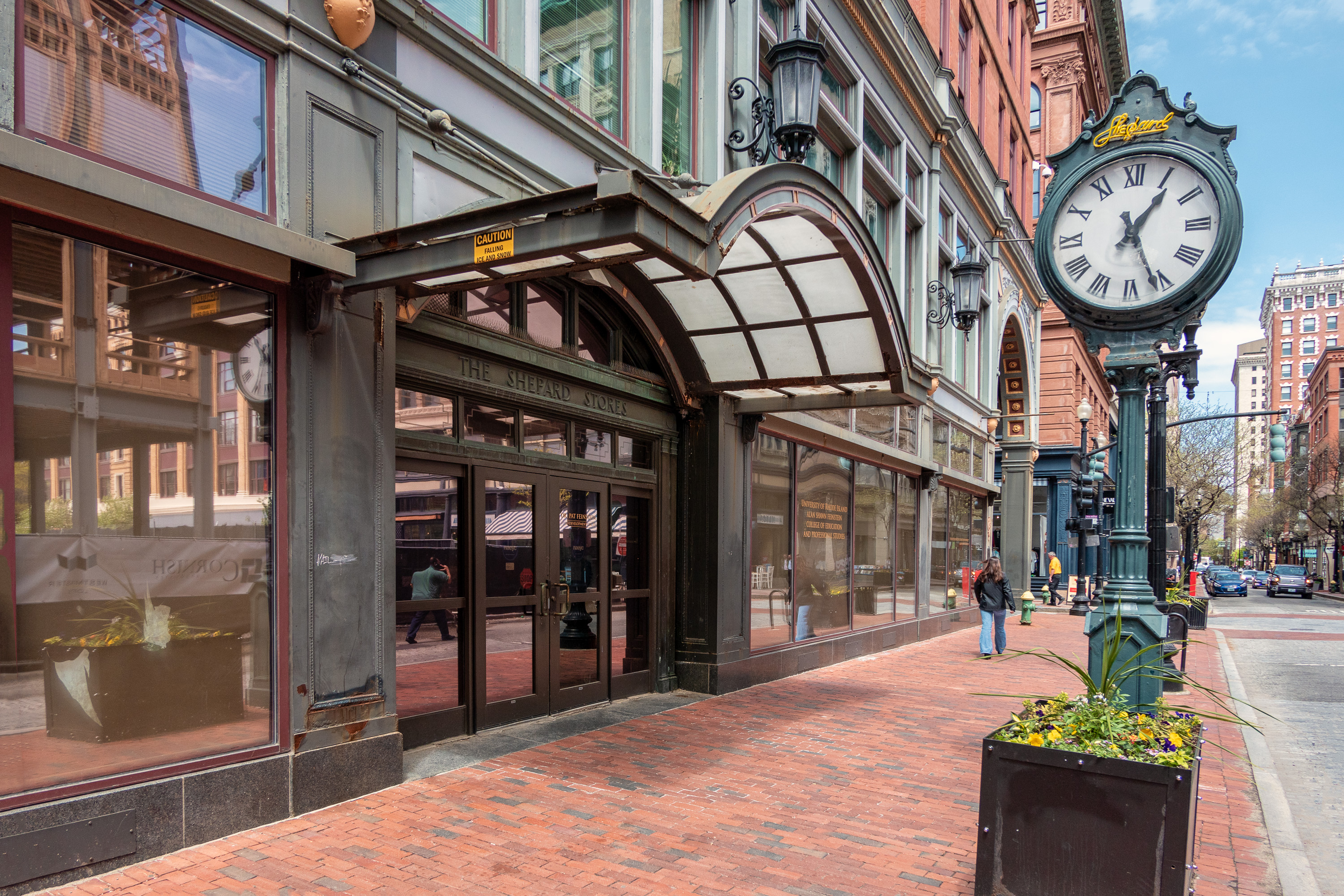
The Shepard Company Building is a historic former department store which is now used by the University of Rhode Island

Various universities have facilities in Downtown Providence. These include:

- Brown University has recently bought several properties in the Jewelry District.
- Johnson & Wales University has its central and largest campus in Downtown. This campus includes the Johnson & Wales School of Business, School of Technology, College of Arts and Science, and School of Hospitality.
- The Rhode Island School of Design (RISD), historically based along the western slope of College Hill, now has extensive facilities in Downtown. These include the RISD Library, founded in 1878, and now relocated at 15 Westminster Street. Dormitories for undergraduates and studios for graduate students are also located in Downtown.
- Roger Williams University includes a small campus in Downtown.
- The University of Rhode Island's Feinstein Providence campus is centered at 80 Washington Street, with other facilities in the Shepard Building. The program is named for Rhode Island philanthropist Alan Shawn Feinstein.

== Sports ==
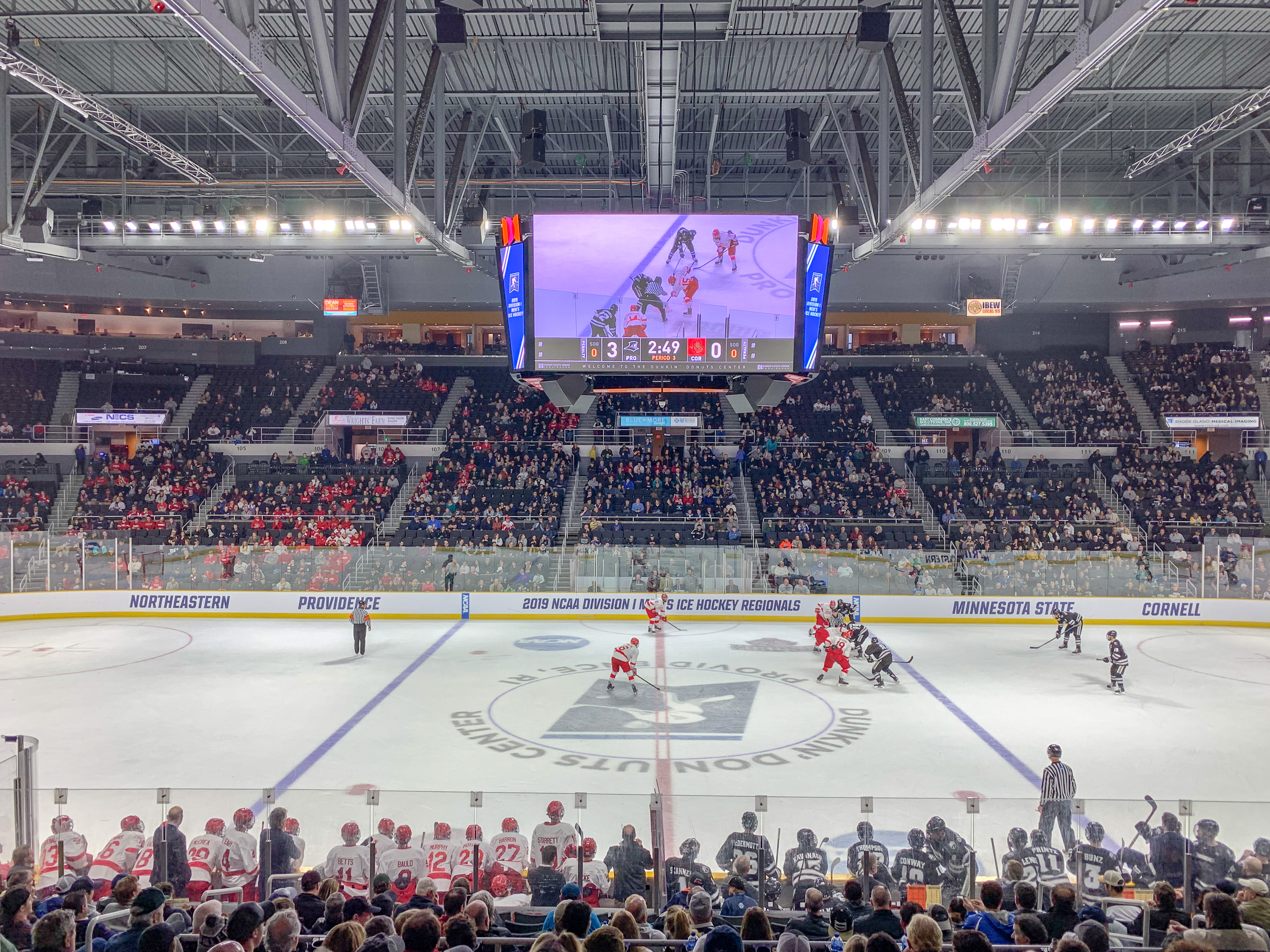
NCAA hockey action at the Amica Mutual Pavilion

The Providence Bruins of the American Hockey League, and the Providence College Friars men's basketball team play out of the Amica Mutual Pavilion (formerly the Dunkin' Donuts Center and Providence Civic Center) at 1 LaSalle Square.

== Arts ==
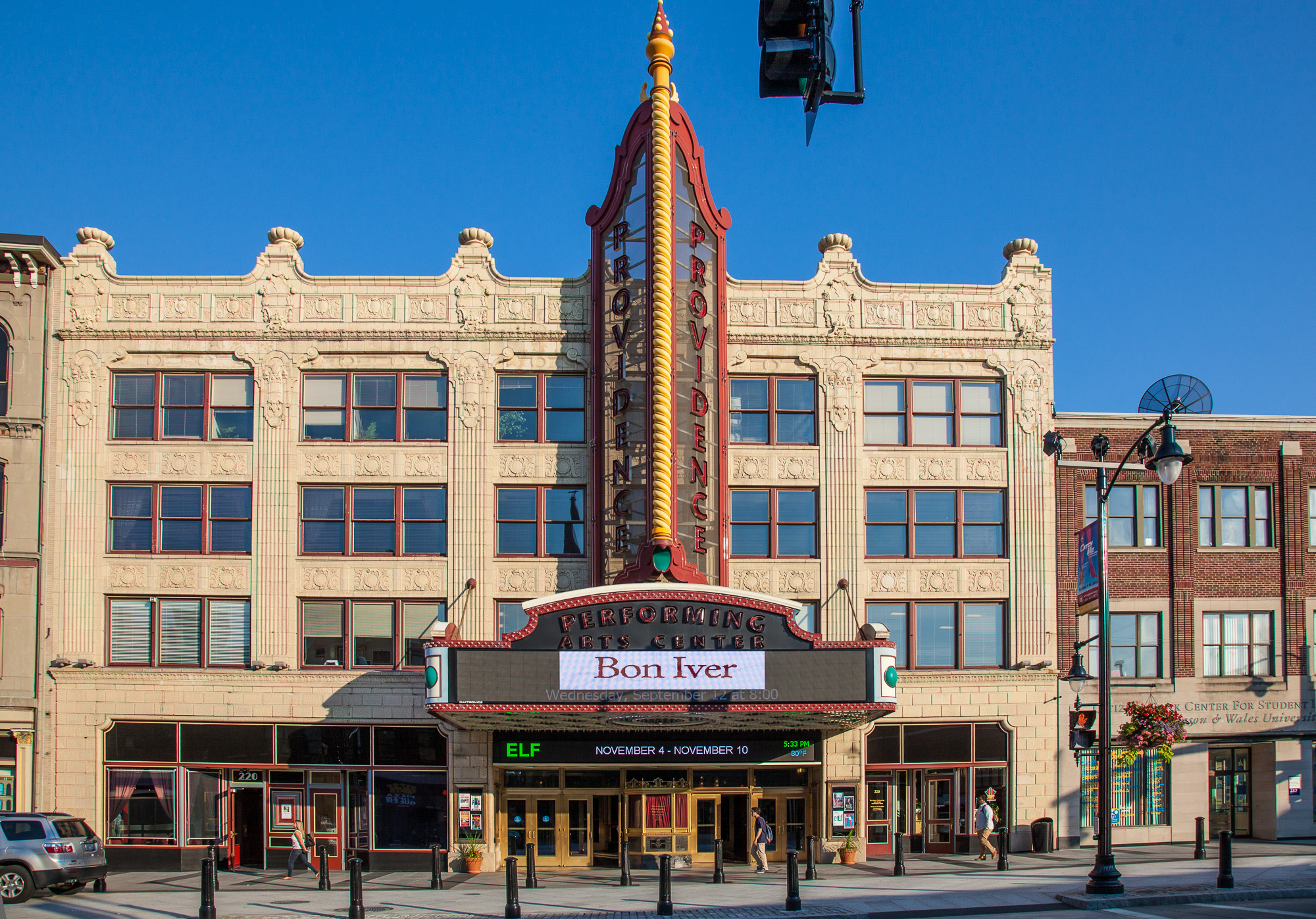
Providence Performing Arts Center

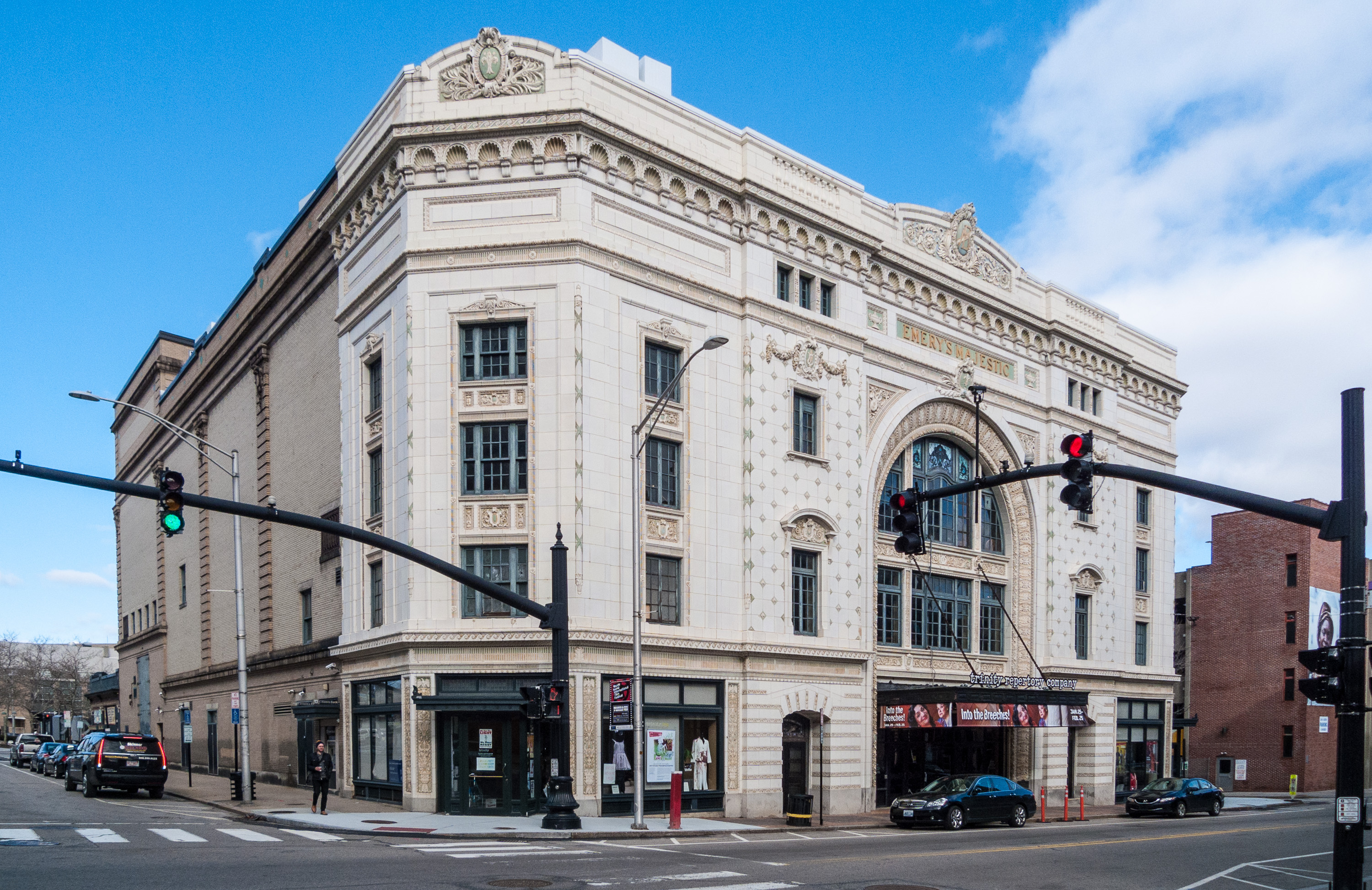
Trinity Repertory Company

As part of the revitalization of Providence, the administrations of Mayors Vincent Cianci and David Cicilline have promoted the city, especially its "Downcity Arts District", as an artistic center. WaterFire, perhaps the most visible symbol of Providence's development, is an environmental art event created by Barnaby Evans which includes bonfires, gondolas, and music. This event has become a major attraction for both Rhode Islanders and tourists from farther away.

The Downcity Arts District includes two centers for the performing arts: the Providence Performing Arts Center and Trinity Repertory Company.

The Downcity Arts District is also home to AS220, a non-profit community arts center that includes 53 artist live/work studios, four galleries, a performance space, a black box theatre, a dance studio, a bar, and restaurant. There is also a makerspace consisting of a print shop, fab lab, media arts lab, and darkroom, with a free after-school arts education program for youth.

== Architecture ==
Downtown Providence has numerous 19th-century mercantile buildings in the Federal and Victorian architectural styles, as well as several post-modern and modernist buildings that are located throughout this area. In particular, a fairly clear spatial separation appears between the areas of pre-1980s and post-1980s development; Fountain Street and Exchange Terrace serve as rough boundaries between the two.

== Parks ==
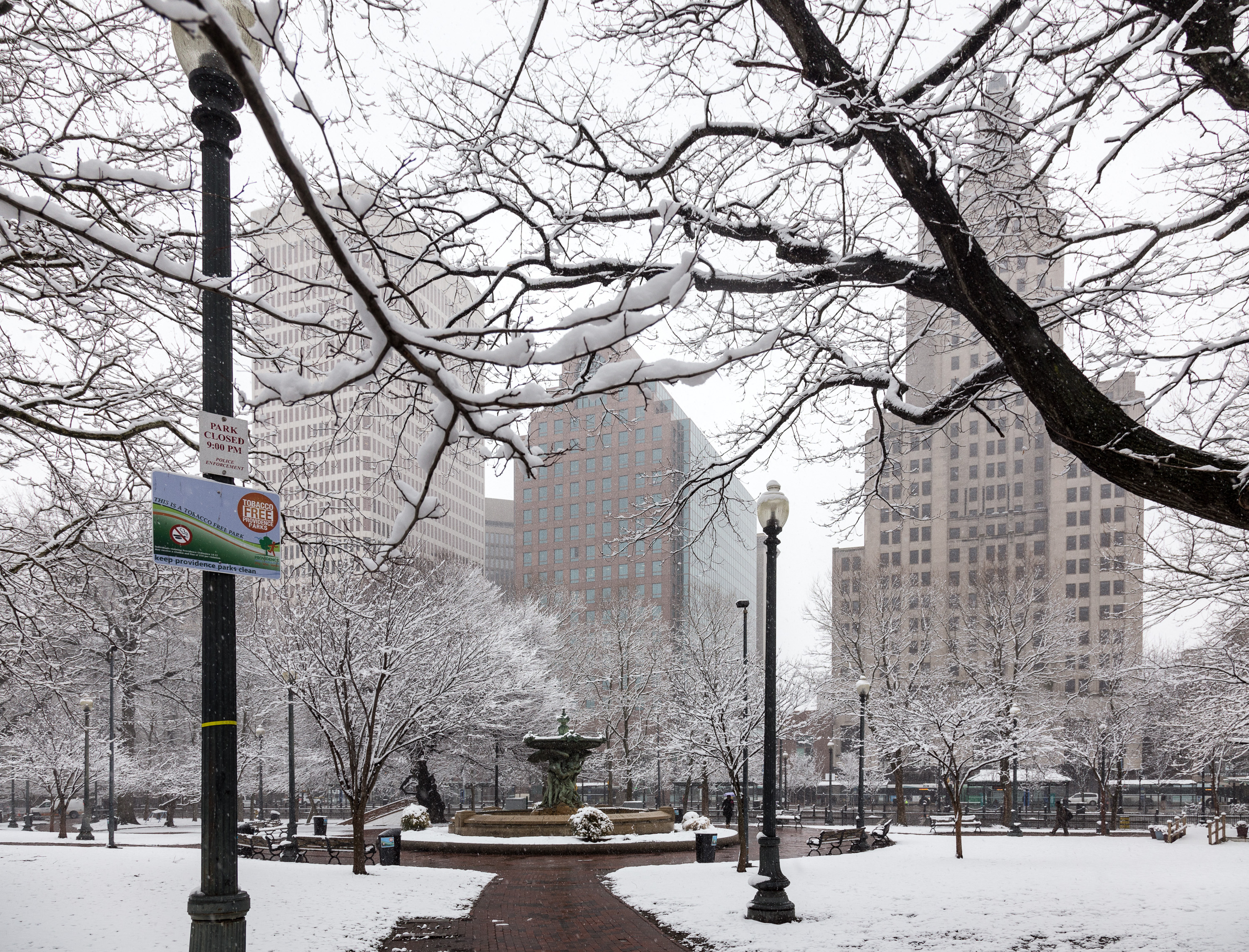
Burnside Park

Downtown Providence contains several parks:

- Burnside Park is located adjacent to Kennedy Plaza. At its center is an equestrian statue of American Civil War general, Rhode Island governor, and United States Senator Ambrose Burnside. Adjacent to the park is an outdoor ice skating rink, the Alex and Ani City Center.
- Waterplace Park extends from the Great Salt Cove to the Riverwalk along the Providence River. The park hosts WaterFire festivals.
- Station Park, a green space adjacent to the Providence Amtrak Station.

In addition, Veterans Memorial Park and Market Square, along the border between Downtown and College Hill, are sometimes counted as Downtown parks.

== Central Downtown ==
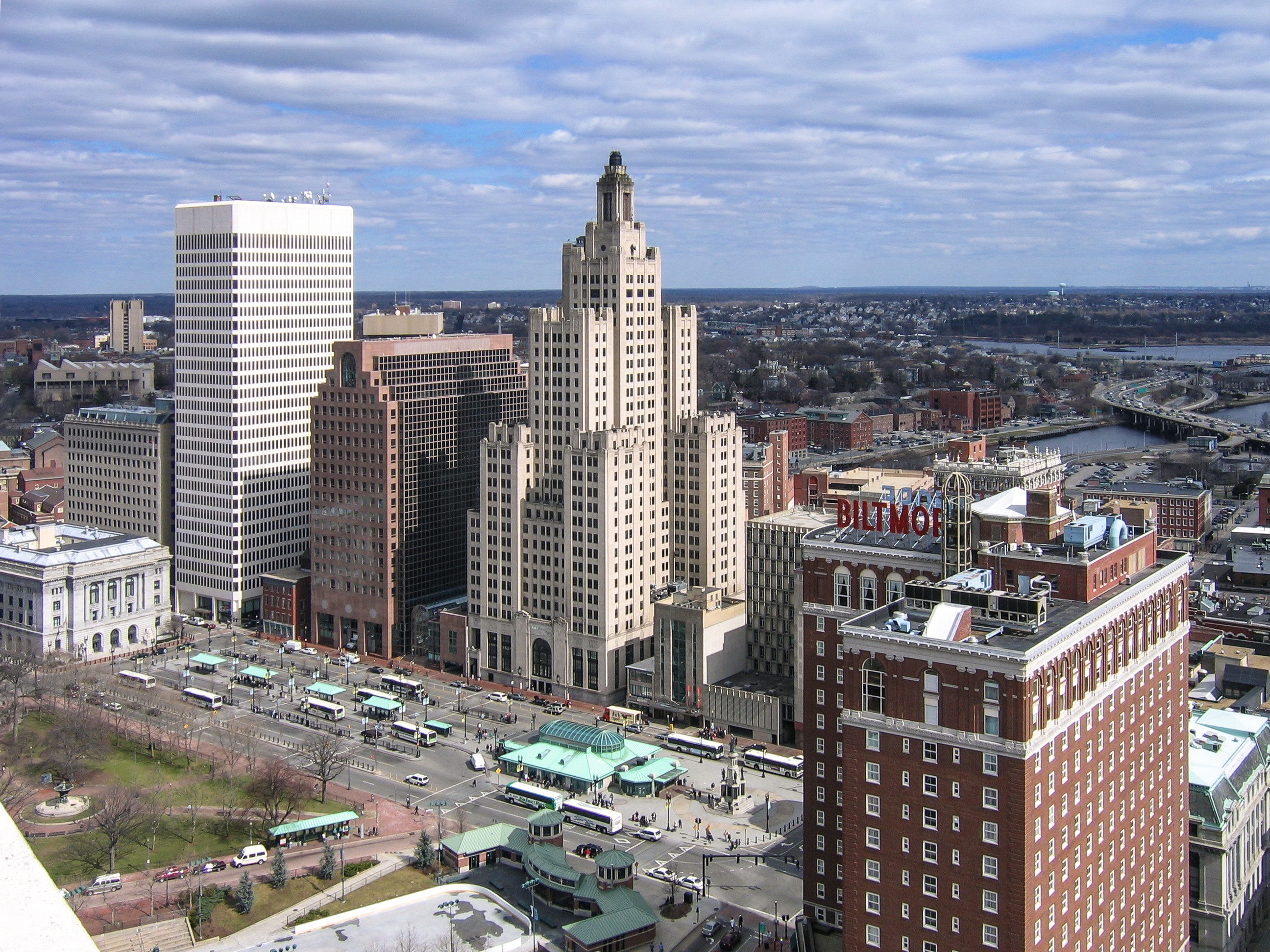
One Financial Plaza, 50 Kennedy Plaza, and the "Superman Building" stand along the southern edge of Kennedy Plaza

The historic part of downtown has many streetscapes that still look as they did 80 years ago. Most of the state's tallest buildings are found in this area. The largest structure, to date, is the art-deco-styled Industrial National Bank Building (commonly called the "Superman Building"), at 426 feet (130 m). A nearby contrast is the second-tallest One Financial Center (Sovereign Bank Tower), designed in modern taut-skin cladding, constructed a half-century later. In between the two is 50 Kennedy Plaza. The Textron Tower is another core building in the Providence skyline.

Downtown is also the home of the Providence Biltmore hotel and the Westminster Arcade, the oldest enclosed shopping mall in the country, built in 1828.

Kennedy Plaza is a major business and transportation hub. Surrounding the plaza are Providence City Hall, Burnside Park, the Bank of America Building, One Financial Center, 50 Kennedy Plaza, Bank of America Ice Skating Rink, and the US District Court building. The plaza itself includes the central transfer hub for the Rhode Island Public Transit Authority (RIPTA) and a police substation.

== See also ==
- Jewelry District, a region sometimes associated with downtown
