= John Pinto =

John Pinto may refer to:

- John Pinto (politician) (1924–2019), American politician
  - John Pinto Highway, New Mexico, United States
- John Pinto (historian), American architectural historian
- John Pinto (basketball) (born 1990), Filipino basketball player
- John L. Pinto, English musician in Noori

== See also ==
- Johnes Pinto, Brazilian footballer
- Jack Pinto (disambiguation)
