= Opening ceremony =

Official opening of a building or event

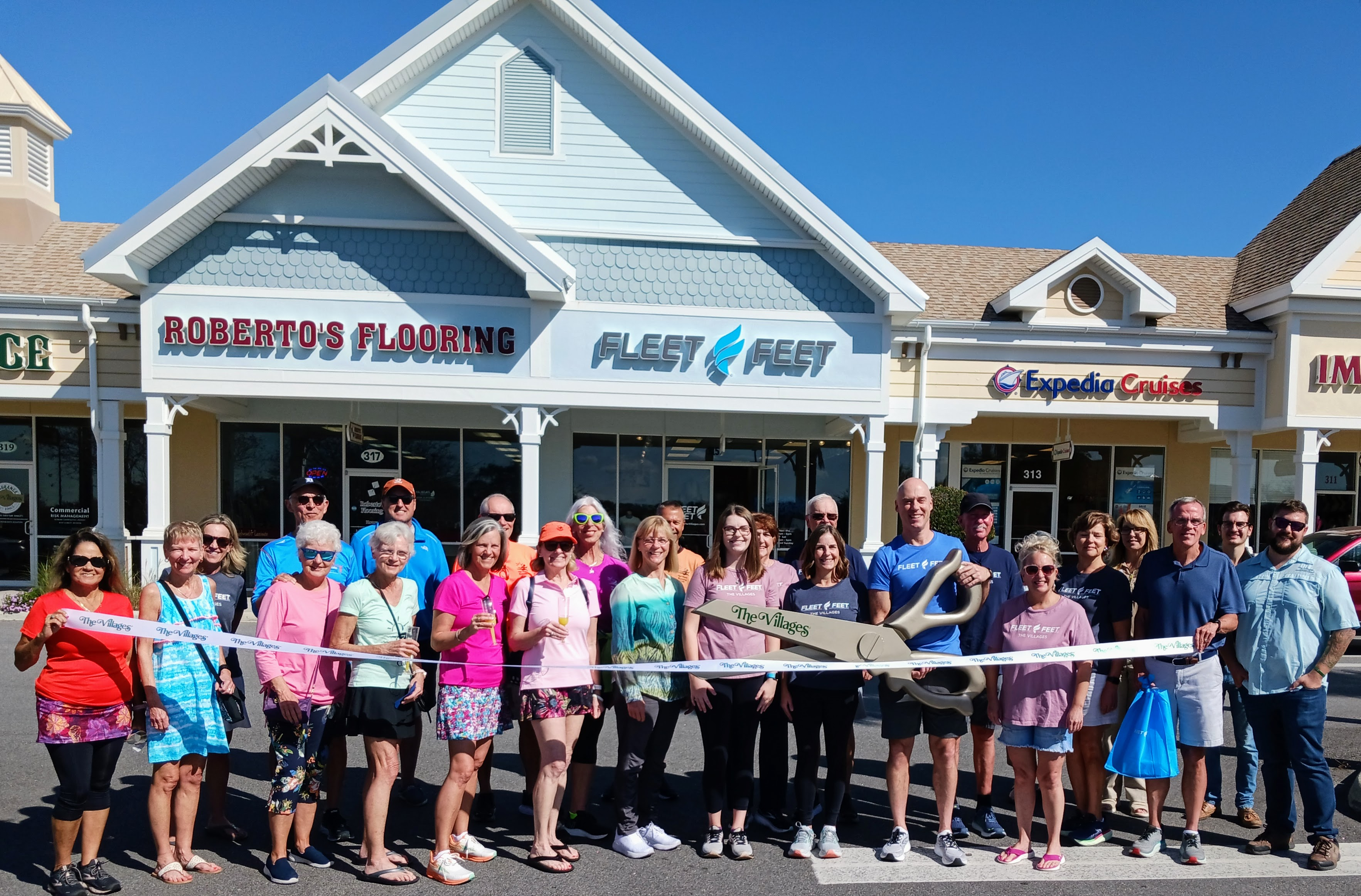
Ribbon-cutting ceremonies often involve an oversized pair of scissors

An opening ceremony, grand opening, or ribbon-cutting ceremony marks the official opening of a newly constructed location or the start of an event. Opening ceremonies at significant events such as the Olympic Games, FIFA World Cup, and the Rugby World Cup might involve thousands of participants and be watched worldwide. Such tournaments often also include a closing ceremony at the end of the event.

== Ribbon cutting ==
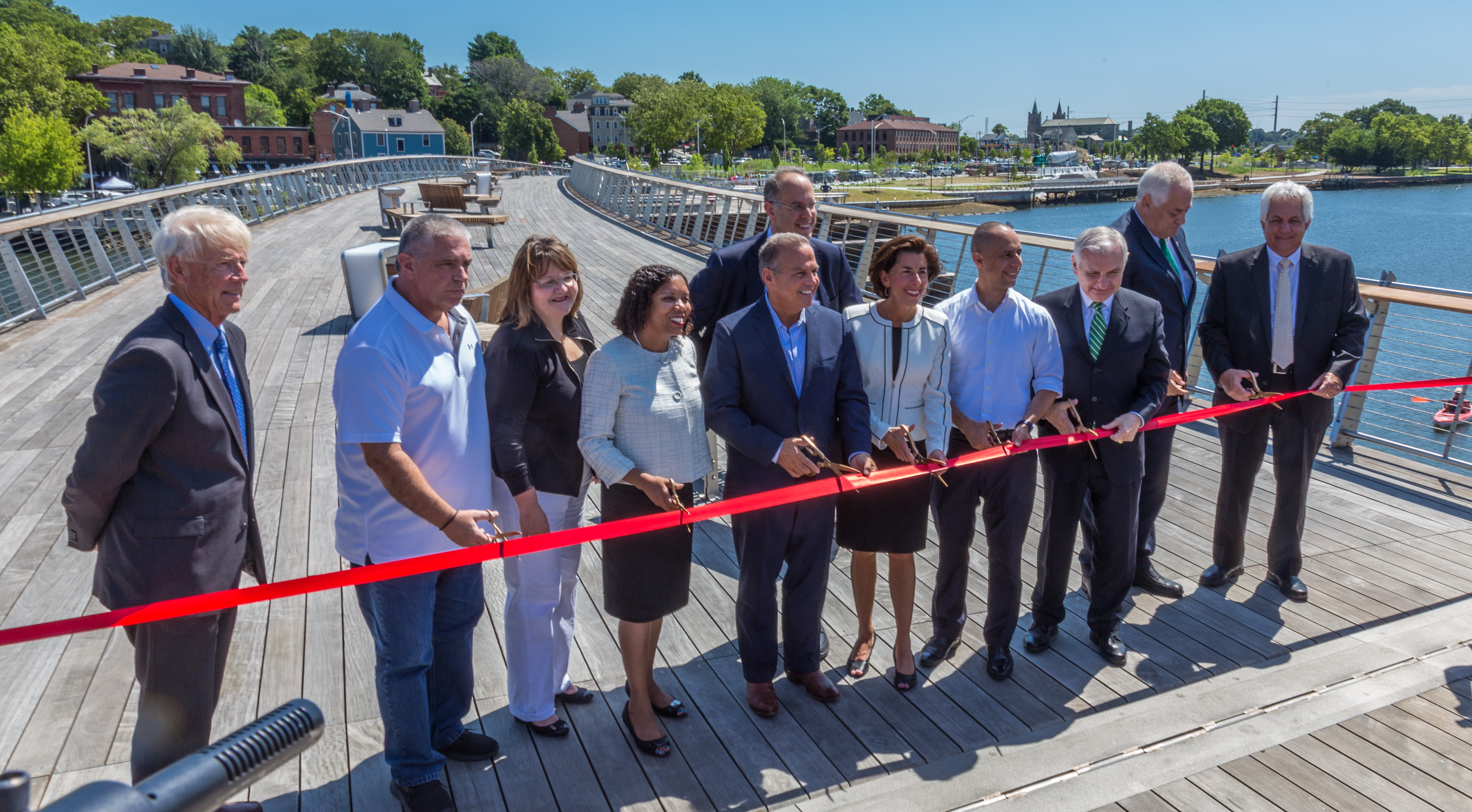
Opening a new pedestrian bridge in Providence, Rhode Island

A ribbon cutting is a ceremonial event to mark the opening of a new business or a newly renovated business location. It typically involves cutting a ribbon with giant scissors, speeches and presentations by local officials and business owners, and tours of the new facilities. Members of the local community often attend the event, the local chapter of the chamber of commerce, the media, and other guests. It is seen as a celebration of the business and the community it serves.

The ritual originated in the ancient ceremony to open the Cloth Fair at Bartholomew the Great, London. Since 1133, the Lord Mayor of London would open the fair each year by ceremonially cutting a piece of cloth.

== Soft launch or opening ==
In the case of physical establishments, its grand opening might be preceded by a "soft opening" or "soft launch" in which the establishment begins to operate with little promotion to allow testing of operations, procedures, and facilities.

== See also ==
- Ceremonial first pitch
- Ceremonial first puck
- Golden spike
- Groundbreaking
- Olympic Games ceremony
- Ship naming and launching
- Topping out
