= Kevin Lynch Award =

The Kevin Lynch Award of the Massachusetts Institute of Technology's Department of Urban Studies and Planning, established in 1988, is named in honor of the urban planner and author Kevin A. Lynch. It is given to individuals or organizations whose work embodies Lynch’s legacy: advancing understanding of how people perceive, navigate, and shape urban spaces. The award celebrates not just technical innovation, but also the capacity to connect theory with practice, and to champion more just, inclusive, and vibrant cities.

== Honorees ==
Starting in 2014, the awards have been presented in five categories. Earlier awards have been retroactively assigned to these categories.

Past winners:

=== Technology and Media in City Imaging ===
Kounkuey Design Initiative (2018)
Jennifer Pahlka and Code for America (2014)
Manuel Castells (2001)
Richard Saul Wurman (1991)

=== Ecological Sustainability in City Form ===
- Randolph T. Hester (2011)
- Richard M. Daley (2005)

=== Preservation and Change in City Image ===
Barnaby Evans and William D. Warner (2003)
Allan Jacobs (1999)
William L. MacDonald (1989)

=== Justice and Efficiency in City Design ===
- Kofi Boone (2025)
- City of Vancouver Planning Department (2007)
- Allan Heskin (1990s)
- Eric Wolf (1989)

=== Urban Events and Ephemera ===
Barnaby Evans (2003)
Boston’s First Night (1990)
