= William L. MacDonald =

American art historian

William Lloyd MacDonald Jr. (1921–March 6, 2010) was an American architectural historian, specializing in Roman architecture.

He was born in Putnam, CT and grew up in Peterborough, NH. He served during WWII in the U.S. Army Air Forces. In 1953, while a graduate student at Harvard, he married Dale Ely. MacDonald earned A.B., A.M., and PhD degrees at Harvard between 1946 and 1956. In the last year he was a Fellow at the American Academy in Rome, where he became acquainted with another Fellow Robert Venturi whose ideas influenced MacDonald's scholarship. He was hired immediately by Yale where he quickly was given tenure, but just as quickly left Yale - along with several other junior scholars - in 1965. That was the year MacDonald's second book, the highly influential first volume of his The Architecture of the Roman Empire, was published. He landed at Smith College, where in 1974 he was named the Alice Pratt Brown Professor of Art. By that time MacDonald had become internationally renowned for his research and publications on the architecture of the Roman Empire and its influence on later architecture. He published a string of highly influential studies on Roman architecture, focusing especially upon how people experienced the built environment in the Roman world and the influence of Roman architecture and urban design in later times.

== Publications ==
The publications of which MacDonald was most proud were:

Architecture of the Roman Empire vol. I (1965, revised edition 1982)

The Pantheon: Design, Meaning, and Progeny (1976)

Architecture of the Roman Empire II (1986), awarded the Society of Architectural Historians' Alice Davis Hitchcock Award and M.I.T.'s Kevin Lynch Award.

Hadrian's Villa and its Legacy, with John Pinto (1995), awarded the Society of Architectural Historians' Alice Davis Hitchcock Award

Other major publications include:

- The Hippodrome at Constantinople, Harvard dissertation 1956
- Early Christian and Byzantine Architecture, 1962
- The Princeton Encyclopedia of Classical Sites, with Richard Stillwell 1976
- Piranesi's Carceri: Sources of Invention, 1979
