= Randolph T. Hester =

- Education: North Carolina State University; Harvard
- Employer: University of California at Berkeley
- Title: Professor

Randolph T. Hester is a professor in the Department of Landscape Architecture and Environmental Planning at the University of California at Berkeley. Hester is also a sociologist, practicing landscape architect and co-director of Community Development by Design, a neighborhood planning organization focused on community participation and input. Randolph Hester has also published a number of books central to the topic of designing neighborhoods, cities and landscapes; his most recent book Design for Ecological Democracy was published in September 2010.

== Biography ==
Hester grew up in rural North Carolina. He acquired a BA in Landscape Architecture and a BA in Sociology from North Carolina State University, and eventually went on to achieve an MA in Landscape Architecture at Harvard. Hester published his first book Neighborhood Space in 1975.

== Awards and distinctions ==
2011 Kevin Lynch Award - presented by MIT School of Architecture and Planning

== Publications ==
- Design for Ecological Democracy, Cambridge, Massachusetts: MIT Press, 2010. ISBN 978-0-262-51500-9
- Living Landscape: Reading Cultural Landscape Experiences, with S. Chang, S. Wang (Eds.), Taipei: Taiwan United Force Culture Enterprise Co. Ltd, 1999.
- A Theory for Building Community, with S. Chang, Taipei: Yungliou Press, 1999.
- Democratic Design in the Pacific Rim, with C. Kweskin (Eds.), Mendocino, California: Ridge Times Press, 1999.
- Techniques for Machizukuri, with M. Dohi, Gendaikikakushitsu Press, 1997.
- The Meaning of Gardens, with M. Fancis (Eds.), Cambridge, Massachusetts: MIT Press, 1990. ISBN 978-0-262-56061-0
- Community Design Primer, Mendocino, California: Ridge Times Press, 1990. ISBN 978-0-934203-06-7
- Community Goal Setting, with F.J. Smith, Stroudsburg, Pennsylvania: Dowden, Hutchinson and Ross Inc., 1982.
- Planning Neighborhood Space with People, New York: Van Nostrand Reinhold Company, 1982. ISBN 978-0-442-23223-8
- Neighborhood Space, Stroudsburg, Pennsylvania: Dowden, Hutchinson and Ross Inc., 1975.
