= Jack Pinto =

Jack Pinto may refer to:

- Jack Pinto, American radio personality at WFJS (AM)
- Jack Pinto, American singer (1967-2011) in Old School (quartet)
- Jack Pinto (2006–2012), victim in the Sandy Hook Elementary School shooting

== See also ==
- John Pinto (disambiguation)
- Pinto (disambiguation)
