= Waterplace Park =

Park in Providence, Rhode Island, United States

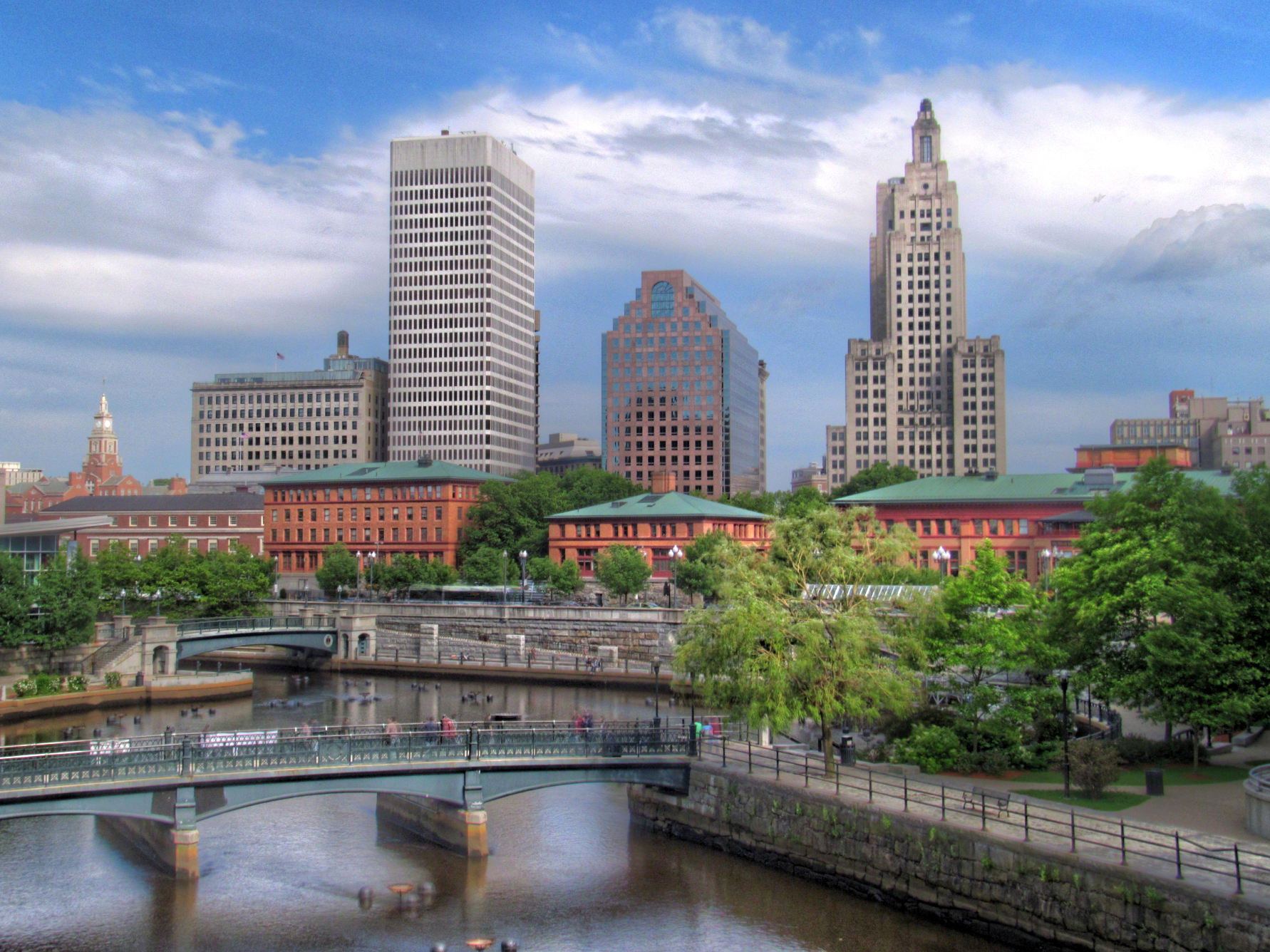
- Interactive map of Waterplace Park
- Location: Providence, Rhode Island
- Coordinates: 41.8237113°N 71.4075563°W
- Created: 1994

Waterplace Park is an urban park situated along the Woonasquatucket River in downtown Providence, Rhode Island at the original site of the Great Salt Cove. Finished in 1994, Waterplace Park is connected to 3/4 mile of cobblestone-paved pedestrian walkways along the waterfront known as Riverwalk. Venice-styled Pedestrian bridges cross the river. Most of Riverwalk is below street level and automotive traffic. Waterplace Park and Riverwalk jointly host the city's popular summertime WaterFire events, a series of bonfires lit on the river accompanied by classical and world music.

== History ==
This is a map from a city atlas of Providence and vicinity, published in 1882 by G.M. Hopkins of Philadelphia. The map shows parts of quarters 4, 5, and 7 of the city, including the "Cove Basin" area.

The City Center of Providence was once covered by water, known as Great Salt Cove. Beginning in 1856, the Cove was gradually filled in and transformed into a smaller circular body of water. By 1900, the entire area had been converted into land. Downtown Providence experienced a decline due to economic conditions, but the River Relocation Project in the 1980s and 1990s aimed to revitalize the city. This project celebrated the city's waterway history and included the construction of Waterplace Park.

== Gallery ==
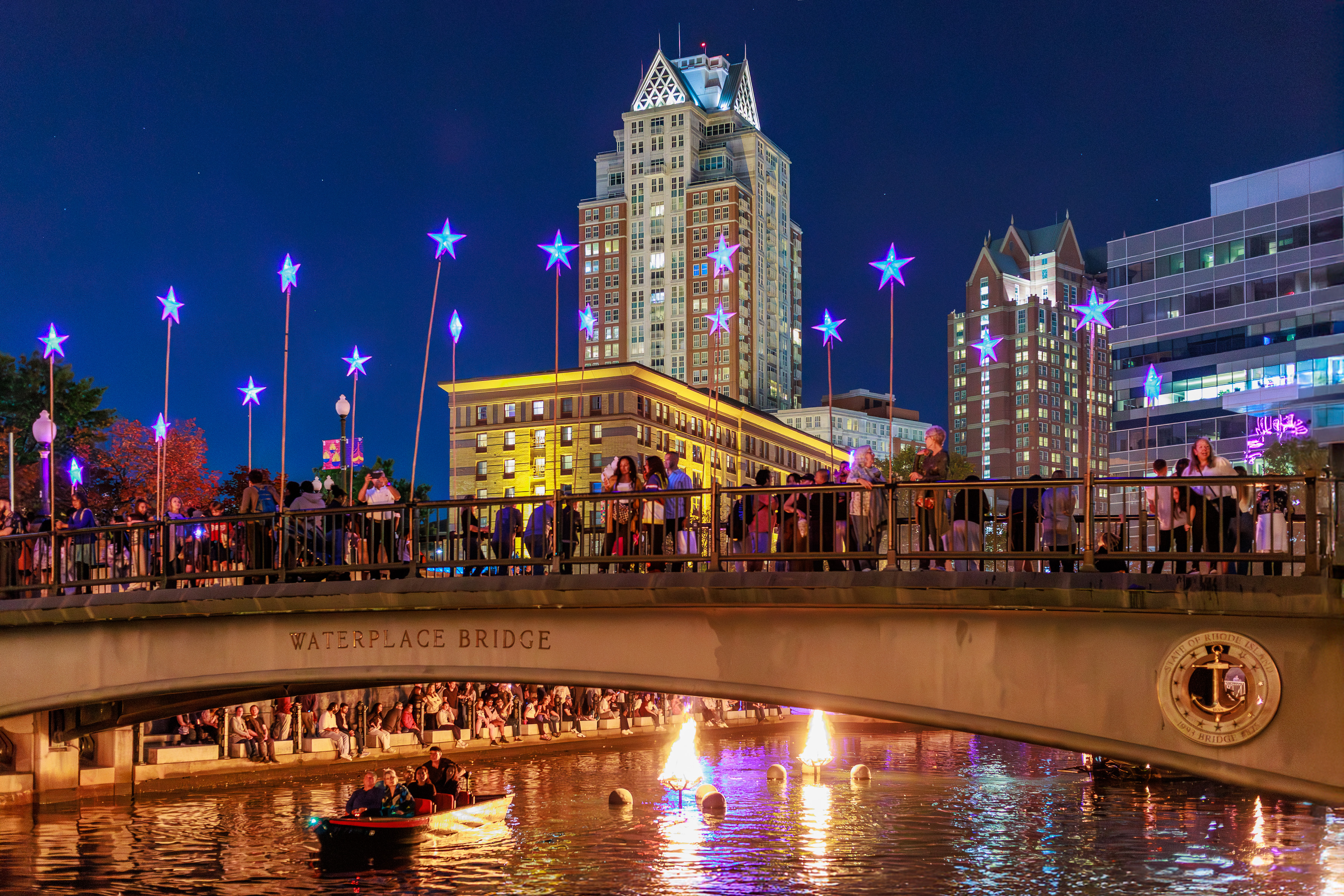
WaterFire transforms Waterplace Park into an immersive outdoor art experience

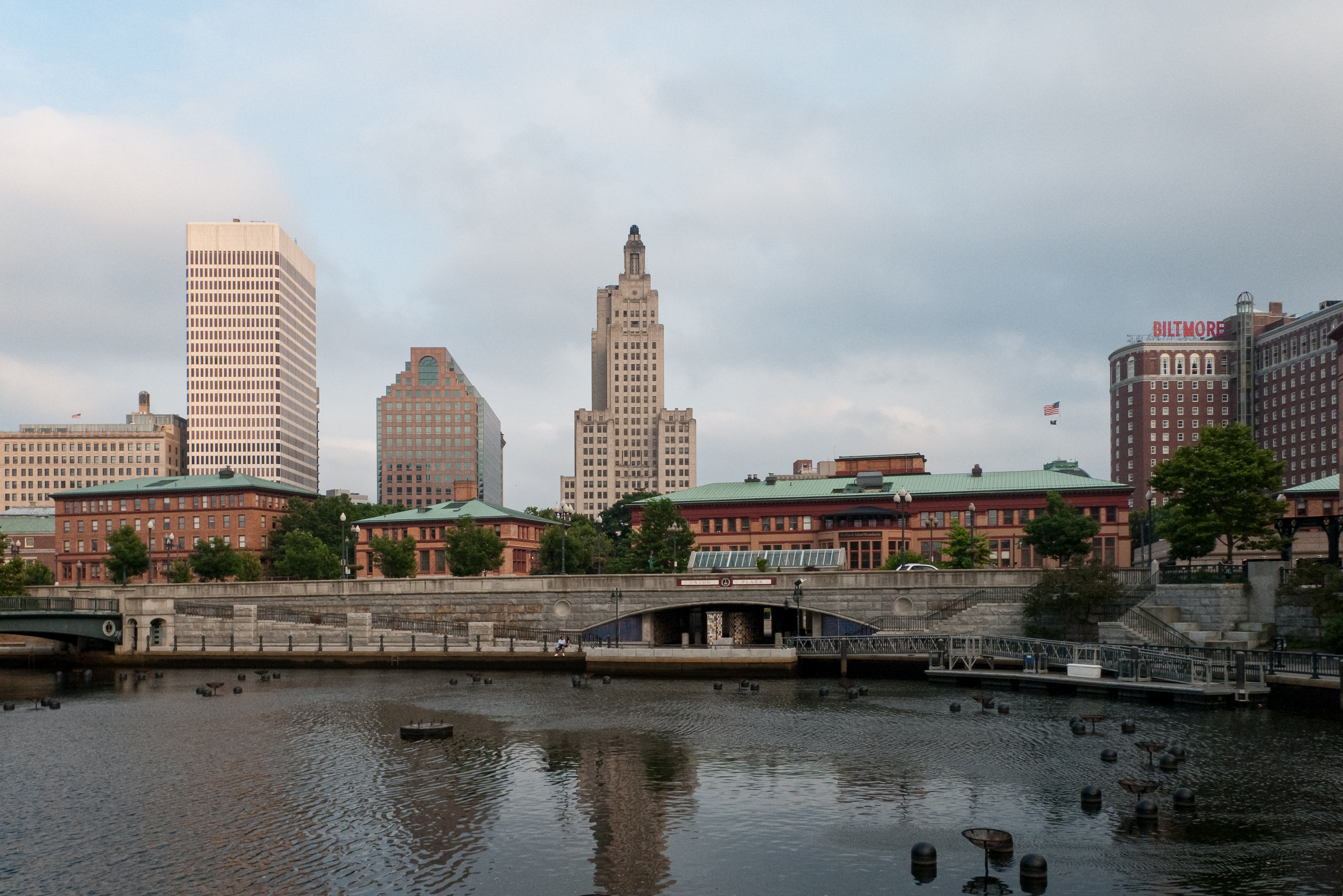
Waterplace Park in 2009

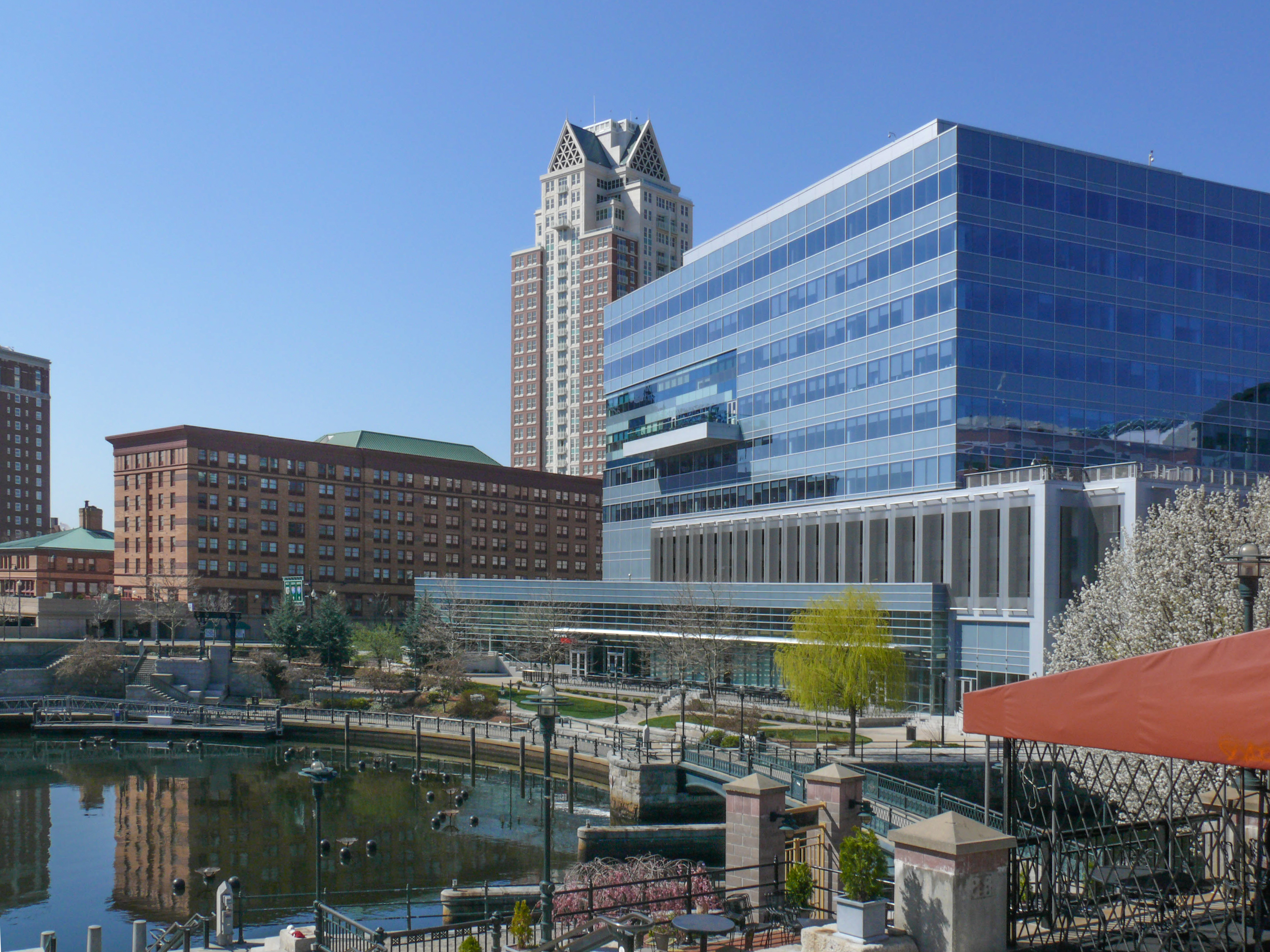
Waterplace Park in 2008.

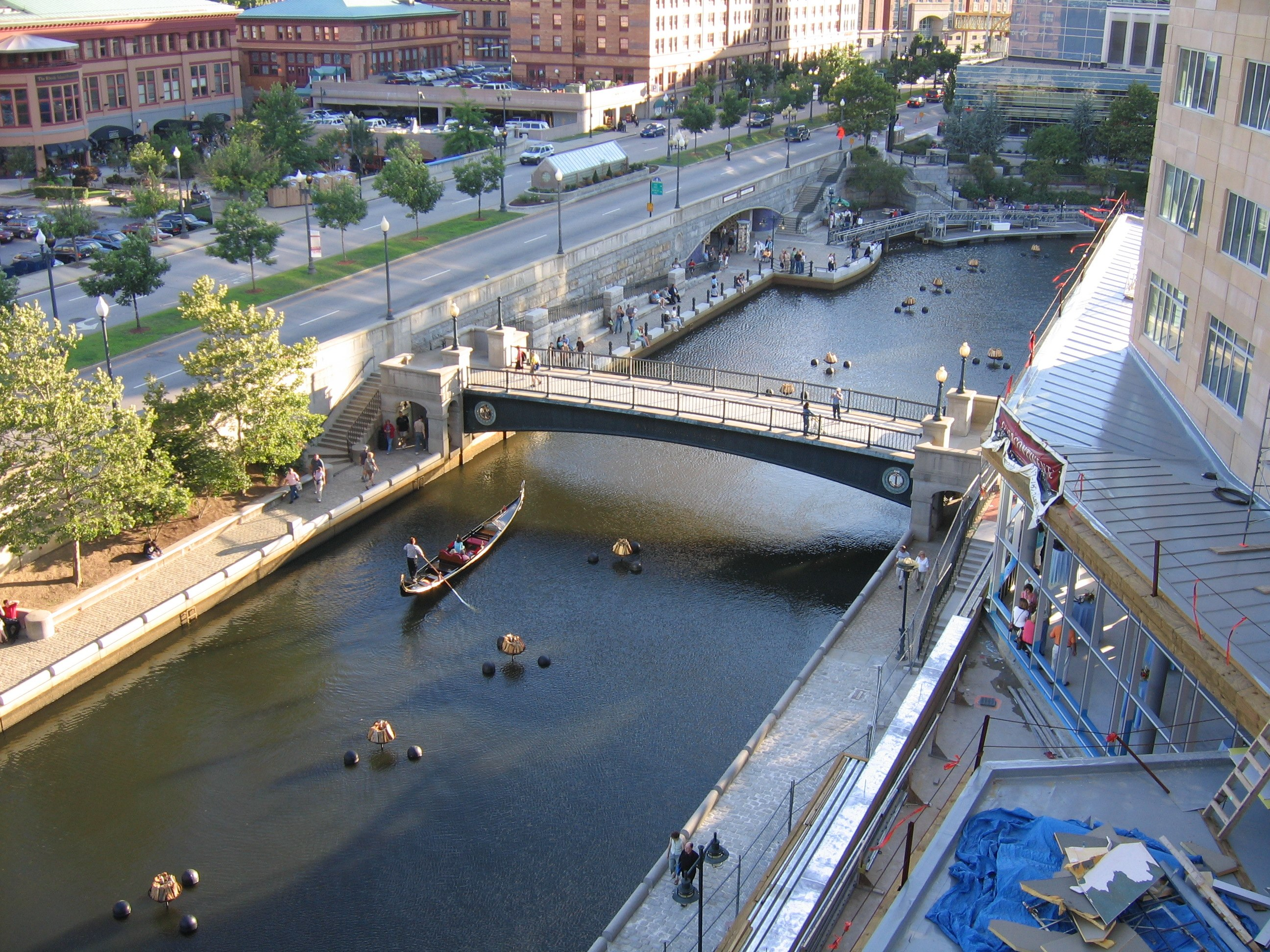
The Woonasquatucket River forms the center of the park

== See also ==
- List of contemporary amphitheatres
