= Michael S. Van Leesten Memorial Bridge =

Van Leesten Memorial Bridge
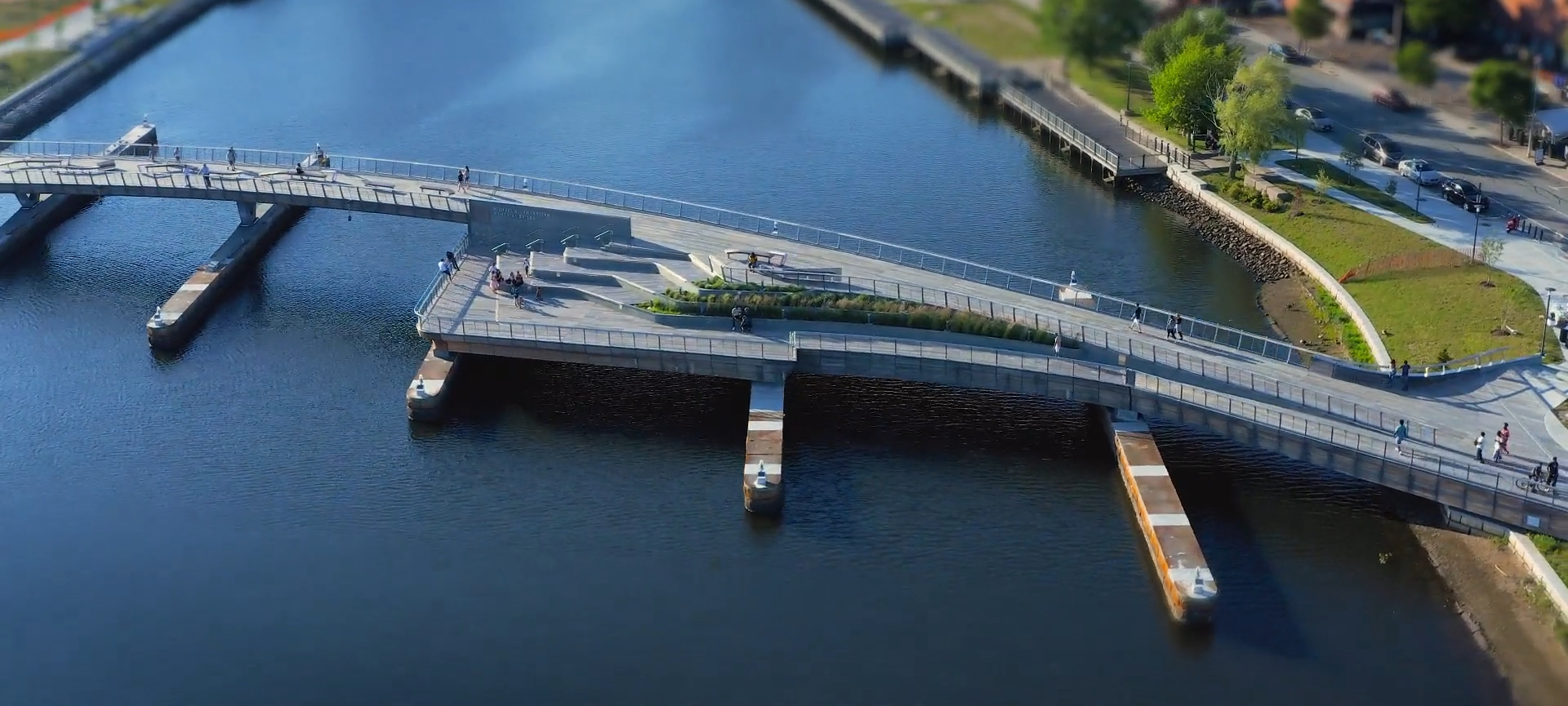
- The bridge as viewed from the southeast
- Coordinates: 41.820364°N 71.405104°W
- Crosses: Providence River
- Locale: Providence, Rhode Island

Characteristics
- Design: Footbridge
- Total length: 450 feet (140 m)

History
- Construction start: 2016
- Construction end: 2019
- Opened: August 9, 2019

Location
- Interactive map of Van Leesten Memorial Bridge

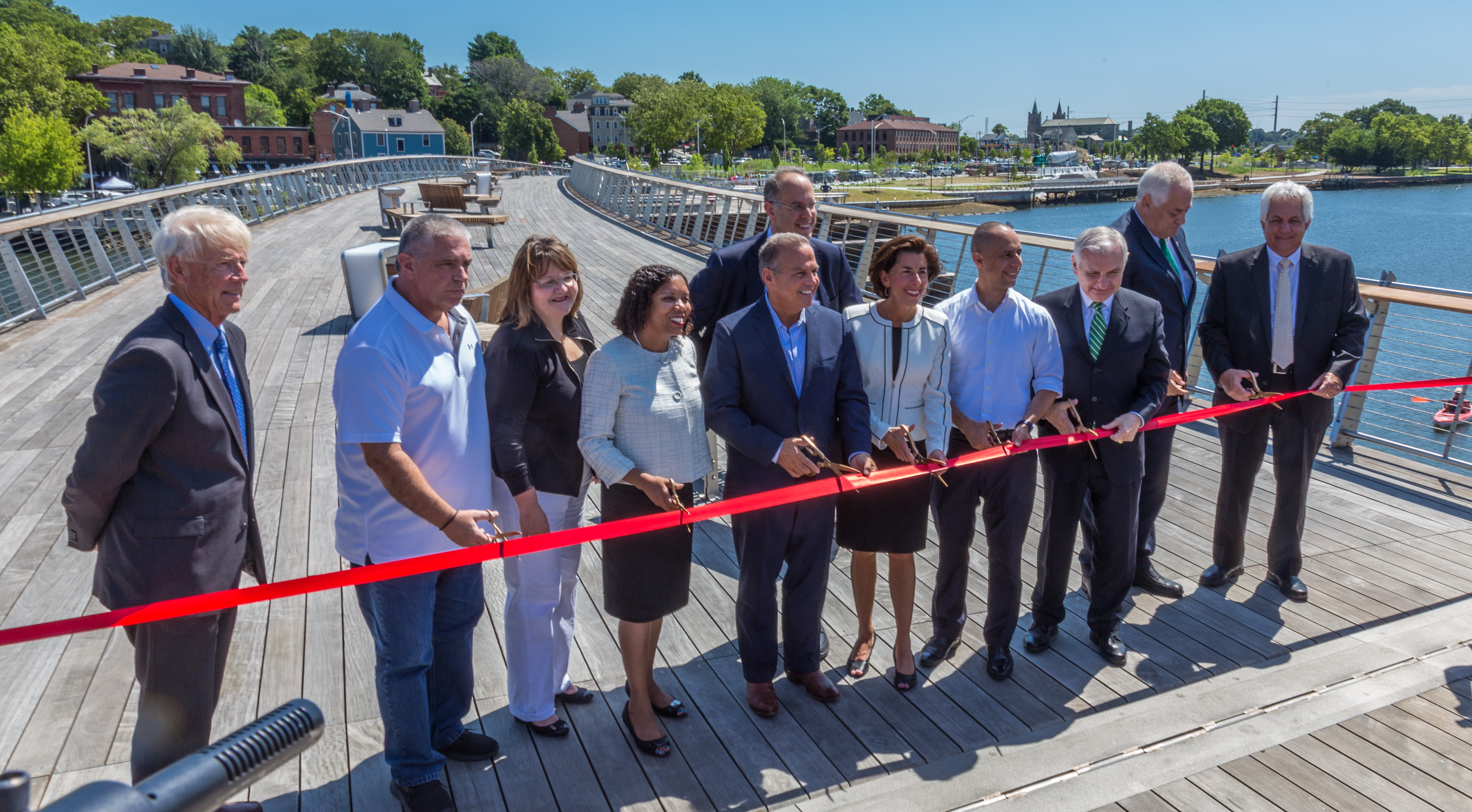
Opening ceremony, August 9, 2019

The Michael S. Van Leesten Memorial Bridge is a footbridge crossing the Providence River located in the city of Providence, Rhode Island. The bridge connects Providence's Fox Point neighborhood to 195 District Park. Originally known as the Providence River Pedestrian Bridge, in July 2020 it was renamed in honor of Michael S. Van Leesten.

The bridge was built on the piers which supported part of Interstate 195 prior to its relocation.

== History ==
The idea of building a pedestrian bridge on the old Interstate 195 (I-195) piers was suggested in 1999 by a Rhode Island School of Design architecture student. Since money would have had to be spent on demolishing the concrete piers, the rationale was to instead build a simple footbridge with those funds. In 2008, the Rhode Island Department of Transportation (RIDOT) allocated US$2 million towards its construction. A Pedestrian Bridge Design Competition was announced in 2010 by then-Providence Mayor David N. Cicilline and then-DOT director Michael P. Lewis, which was entered by 47 design teams from as far away as Barcelona. inFORM Studio from Detroit was chosen as the winner from among the 11 designs that were displayed at Providence City Hall.

The cost grew dramatically due to several factors. First, that design, chosen by the city under then-Mayor Angel Taveras in 2014, increased the cost to $8 million. In 2016, when it was found that the height of the bridge would have to be raised due to rising sea levels, the estimated cost further inflated to $13 million, and the lowest bid the agency received was $16.9 million. In 2018, construction finally began, while changes in the price of steel and other costs led to the final project expense ballooning to $21.9 million.

Per a 2011 agreement, the bridge was transferred from State of Rhode Island to the City of Providence, which will maintain it, for the amount of $1.

The bridge officially opened on August 9, 2019.

The bridge was originally known as the Providence River Pedestrian and Bicycle Bridge. In July 2020 the bridge was named in honor of Michael S. Van Leesten, a local civil rights advocate.

== Structure ==
The bridge is built on the piers of the former stretch of I-195, which was demolished after the Iway was completed. It connects the Fox Point neighborhood on the east end with the Jewelry District on the west end and spans the Providence River. The length is 450 feet (140 m). It contains wooden benches, illuminated tables, built-in chessboards, and stainless-steel railings. The upper deck is made of Brazilian Ipe hardwood, while bluestone steps lead to terraced lower levels containing LED lighting and grass planting. At the time of the opening, a system of parks was being built by the RIDOT as a separate project, which were scheduled to open later in 2019. Enough area of the parks opened with the bridge to allow access by pedestrians and cyclists.

== Controversy ==
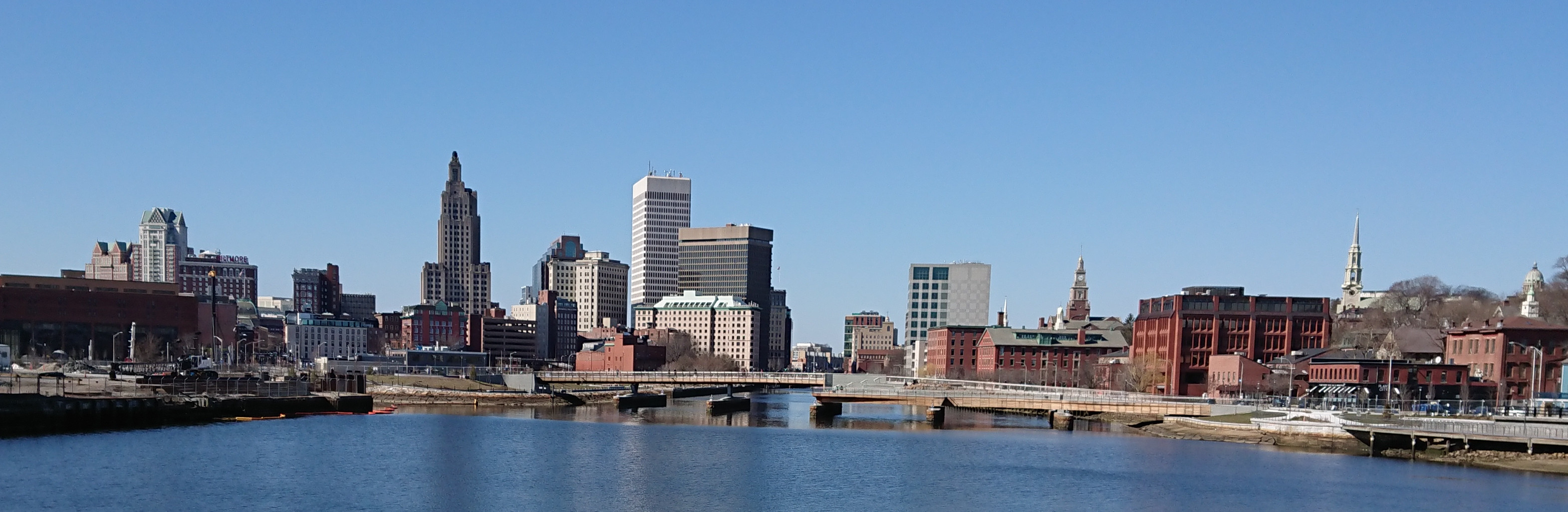
View from the Point Street Bridge

The $21.9 million total cost grew from a 2011 state document estimate stipulating the cost was not to exceed $6 million with any overruns to have been paid by the City.

This has drawn criticism amidst the state having the highest percentage of structurally deficient bridges in the US in 2018 according to the American Road and Transportation Builders Association. West Warwick state representative Patricia Morgan has stated, "We are not walking on pedestrian bridges. We are trying to drive to work safely, and we are tired of going over bad roads and bridges. Until we are at least in the middle of the pack with bridges, it is galling. Everyone should be shaking their heads in disbelief." North Smithfield state representative Brian Newberry added, "A pedestrian bridge seems like extra — bells and whistles. It's nice, but it should not be the priority."

Proponents argue that the bridge will become an attraction in itself. Providence’s Department of Planning and Development Director Bonnie Nickerson believes the footbridge will complete a pedestrian circuit that extends north to the Providence Place mall, while WaterFire could continue south to the bridge. She said "It's going to be a spectacular place to be in itself." DOT director Peter Alviti Jr., while admitting that the DOT's current plans and funding would not let the overrun happen now, said "Look, does it add value to the district newly developing in that area? Yes. I can't deny it is artistic and beautiful from an architectural standpoint." Greater City Providence website founder Jef Nickerson concurs, saying that it will provide stunning views, bicycle and pedestrian connections, and waterfront access. "It's not just a piece of infrastructure — it's a destination. It's a worthy investment."

== Gallery ==
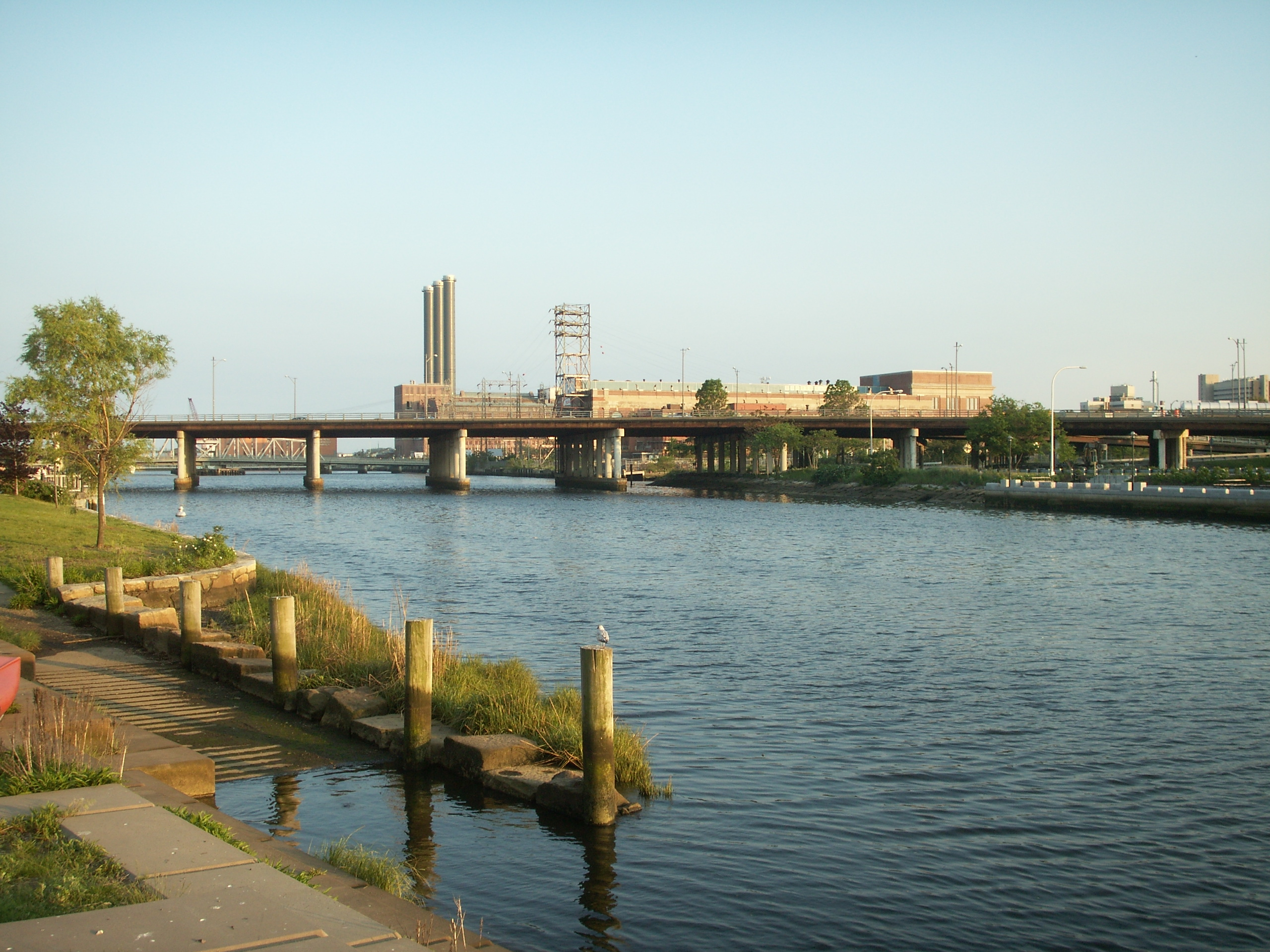
View of the original I-195 Bridge, whose piers the current bridge stands on

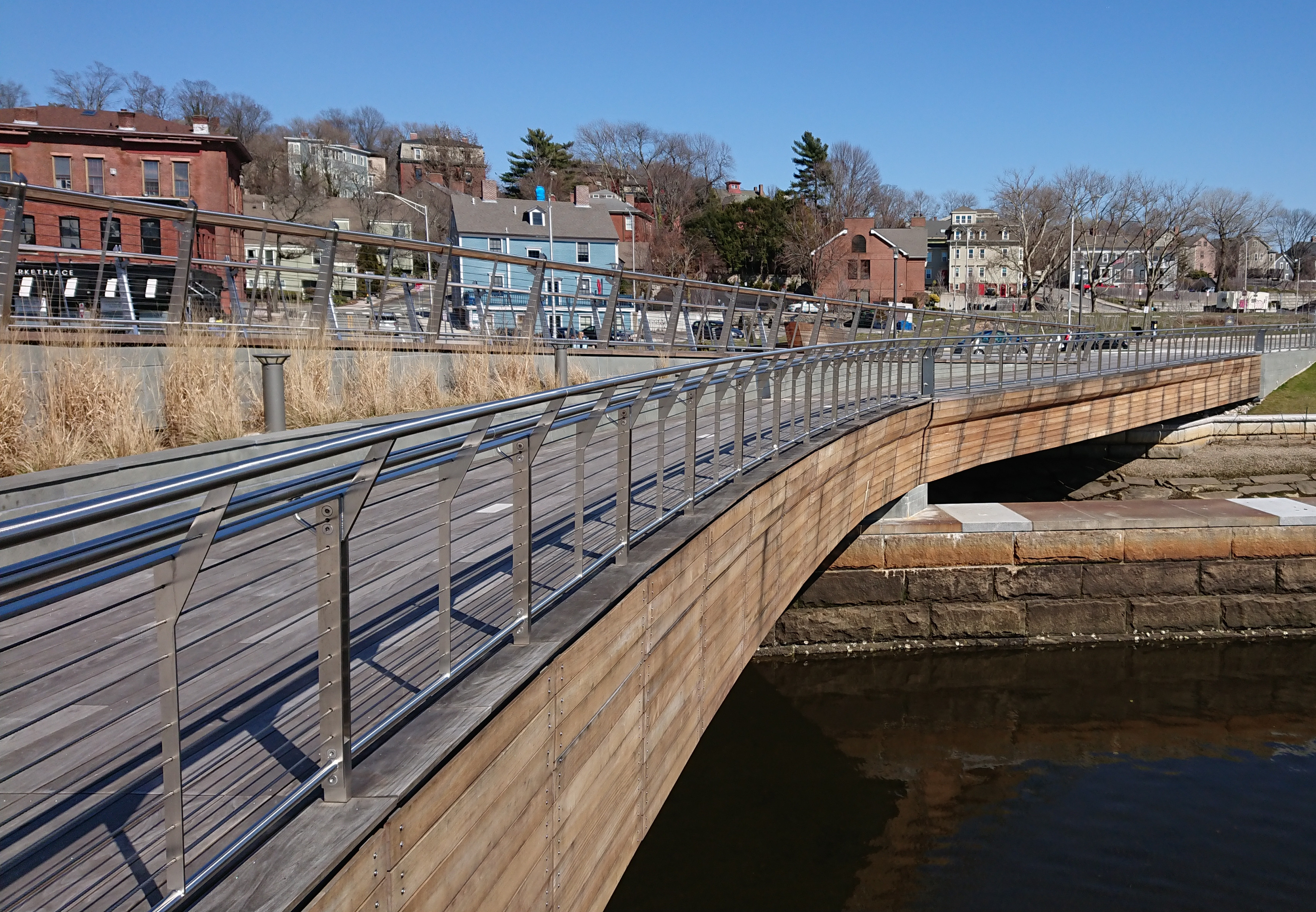
View of the bridge, facing east

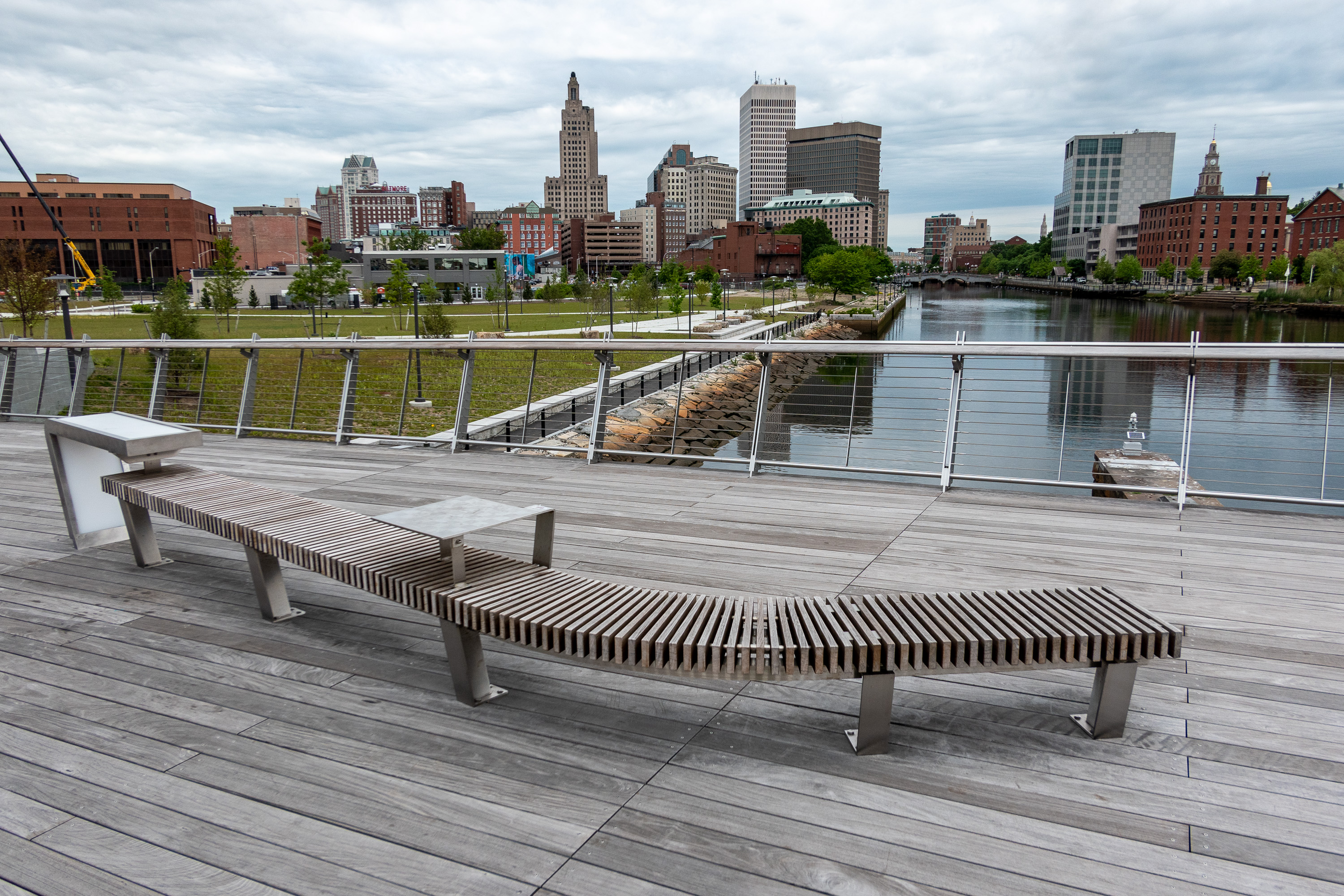
Hardwood benches and chess tables on the bridge

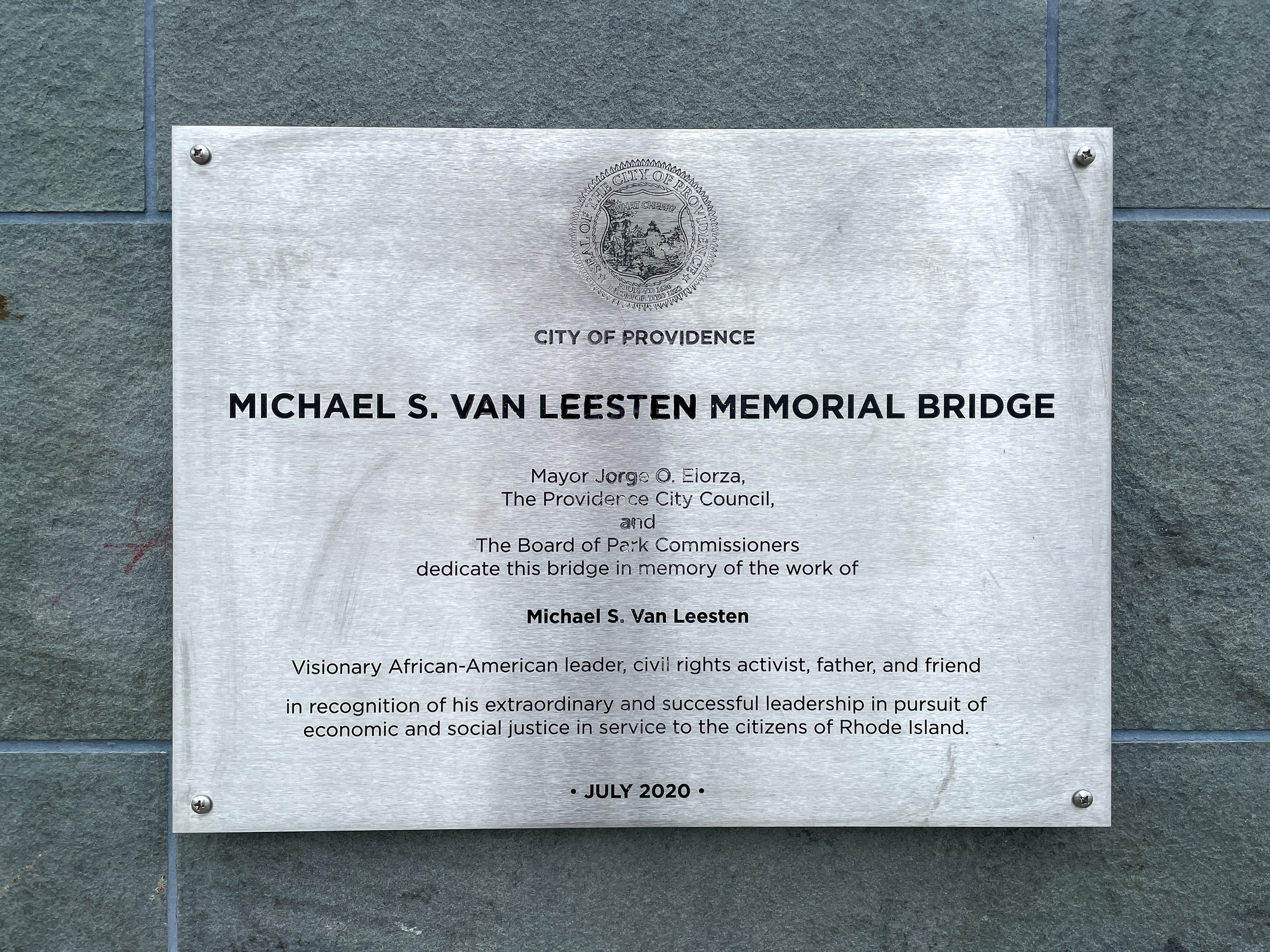
Dedication plaque

== See also ==
- George Redman Linear Park
