= John Pinto (historian) =

American art historian

John Pinto (born February 28, 1948) is an architectural historian specializing in Renaissance and Baroque Rome. He is the Howard Crosby Butler Memorial Professor of Art and Archaeology, Emeritus at Princeton University.

== Education ==
Pinto received his B.A. (1970) and Ph.D. (1976) from Harvard University.

== Career ==
Pinto won the Rome Prize of the American Academy in Rome in 1973. He received the Alice Davis Hitchcock Award of the Society of Architectural Historians in 1996.

Pinto taught at Smith College from 1976 to 1988, and has been at Princeton since then.

== Honors ==
- Fellow (Rome Prize) of the American Academy in Rome
- Ailsa Mellon Bruce Senior Fellow, National Gallery of Art Center for Advanced Study in the Visual Arts, 1984
- Dumbarton Oaks
- Bibliotheca Hertziana
- John Simon Guggenheim Memorial Foundation

== Books ==
- Speaking Ruins: Piranesi, Architects, and Antiquity in Eighteenth-Century Rome, University of Michigan, 2012
- with W. Bruce Lundberg, Steps off the Beaten Path: Nineteenth-Century Photographs of Rome and Its Environs, Charta, 2007
- with Elisabeth Kieven, Pietro Bracci and Eighteenth-Century Rome: Drawings for Architecture and Sculpture in the Canadian Centre for Architecture and Other Collections, Pennsylvania State University Press, 2001.
- with William L. MacDonald, Hadrian’s Villa and Its Legacy, Yale, 1995
- The Trevi Fountain, Yale, 1986.
