= WaterFire =

Public art event by Barnaby Evans

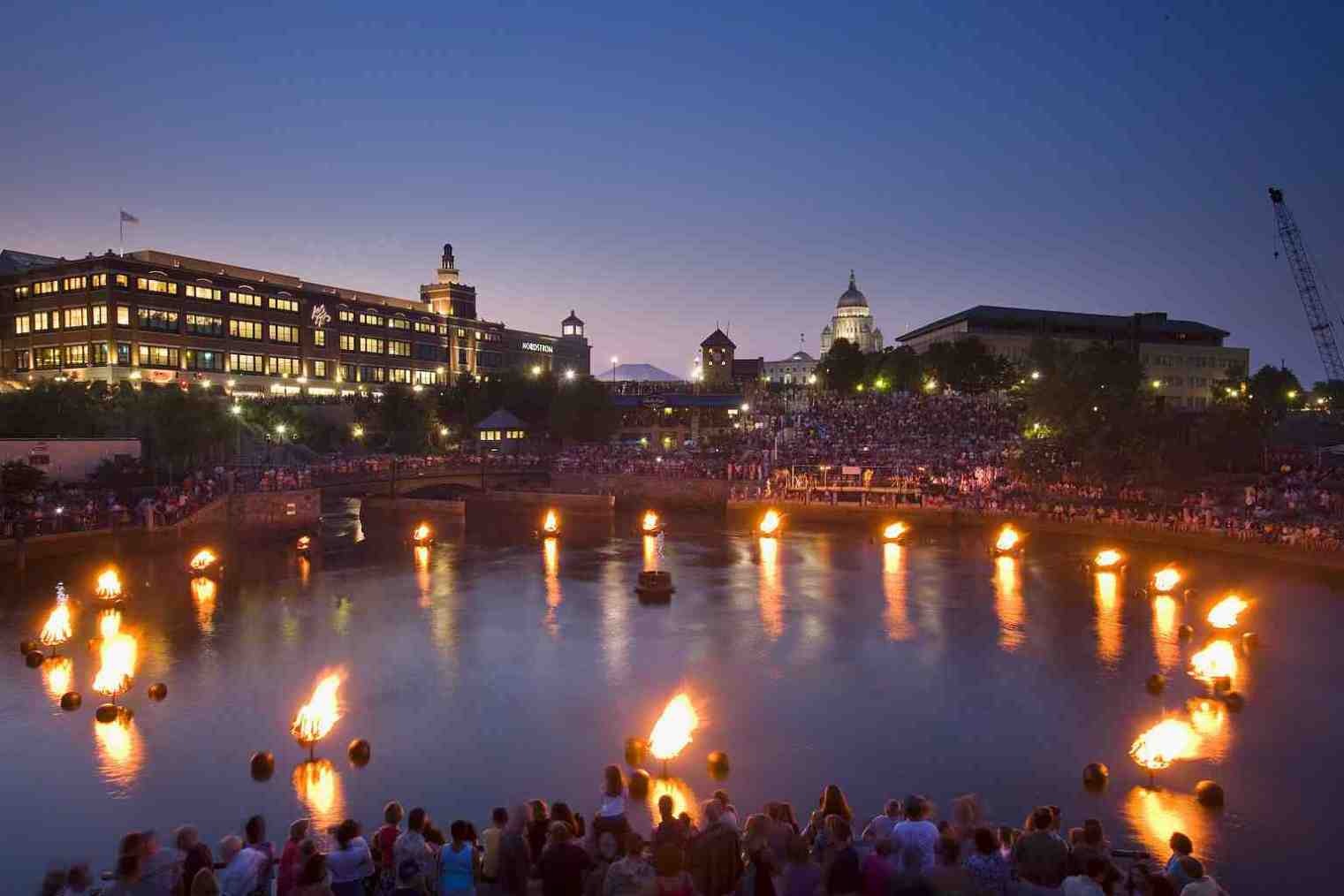
The view of the City of Providence during WaterFire from Waterplace Park

WaterFire is an immersive public art event by Barnaby Evans presented on the rivers of downtown Providence, Rhode Island. It was first created by Evans in 1994 to celebrate the tenth anniversary of First Night Providence, and has since become a free public art installation.

WaterFire evenings consist of eighty-six burning braziers (each with approximately 33 pieces of wood); some float just above the surface of the rivers that flow through Waterplace Park (the Woonasquatucket River) and the middle of downtown Providence (the Moshassuck and Providence rivers; others are mounted on the piers of former bridges.) Average attendance is 40,000 a night, ranging from 10,000 to 100,000.

WaterFire is held May through November, with lightings typically on Saturday evenings once or twice a month. The rivers are tidal, so events are normally scheduled to take place when sunset coincides with an incoming high tide.

== WaterFire Providence ==
WaterFire Providence is the independent 501(C)(3) non-profit arts organization responsible for presenting WaterFire. WaterFire Providence consists of about 15 staff members and relies heavily upon volunteers for the production of WaterFire. On a given night, up to 160 volunteers assist with production.

== History ==
Evans created the first WaterFire, named First Fire on New Year's Eve 1994 as part of the tenth annual of First Night Providence. First Fire consisted of 11 braziers on steel tripods stretching from WaterPlace Basin to Steeple Street. In June 1996, Barnaby created Second Fire for the Convergence Art Festival and the International Sculpture Conference.

Through the support of volunteers, WaterFire returned as a seasonal event. WaterFire gained regional attention and a coordinated effort to fund the project began. In 1997, WaterFire expanded to 42 braziers, and had an estimated attendance of 350,000 people over the entire season. Evans received The Renaissance Award for his effort to revitalize downtown Providence, and WaterFire became the symbol of the city's renaissance.

For the 1998 installation, WaterFire expanded to include 81 fires, with extensions up the Moshassuck River and into the basin at Waterplace Park. WaterFire now enjoys national and international renown, thanks in part to exposure on the part of PBS, of the Washington Post, and much earlier of a Style piece in The New York Times. Likely as among both the causes and effects of the event's broadening reputation, Rome and Singapore have been overseas scenes, joining others in different U.S. cities, of Evans-created programs that were rooted in WaterFire.

== Other locations ==
- In June 1998 Barnaby Evans installed WaterFire in Houston, Texas on the Buffalo Bayou.
- In July 2005 Barnaby Evans designed a WaterFire installation in Columbus, Ohio, called WaterFire Columbus.
- In 2007, Barnaby Evans created a new installation in Kansas City, Missouri on Brush Creek near Country Club Plaza and the Nelson Atkins Museum of Art.
- On September 24 and 25, 2011, Barnaby Evans installed WaterFire in Singapore. The flame from Singapore was sent electronically to Providence to light WaterFire there. The next day, the flame from Providence was sent electronically to Singapore to light WaterFire there.
- On September 21 and 22, 2012, Barnaby Evans installed WaterFire in Rome on the Tiber River between Ponte Sisto and Ponte Giuseppe Mazzini on the Vatican side of the river near the old city.
- In August 2013, Barnaby Evans designed a WaterFire installation in Sharon, Pennsylvania on the Shenango River, called WaterFire Sharon.

== Gallery ==
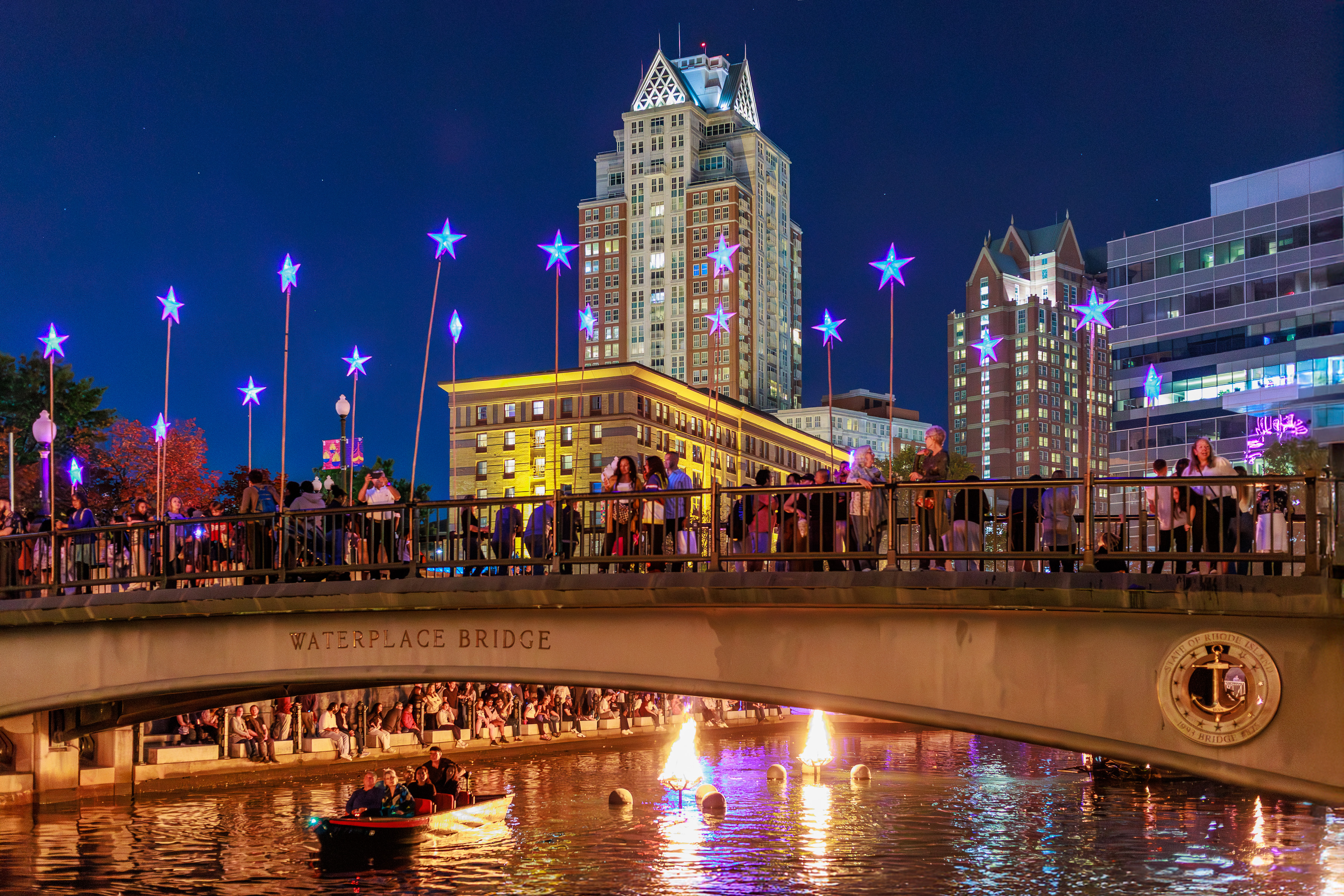
Moody music and star decorations are part of the experience

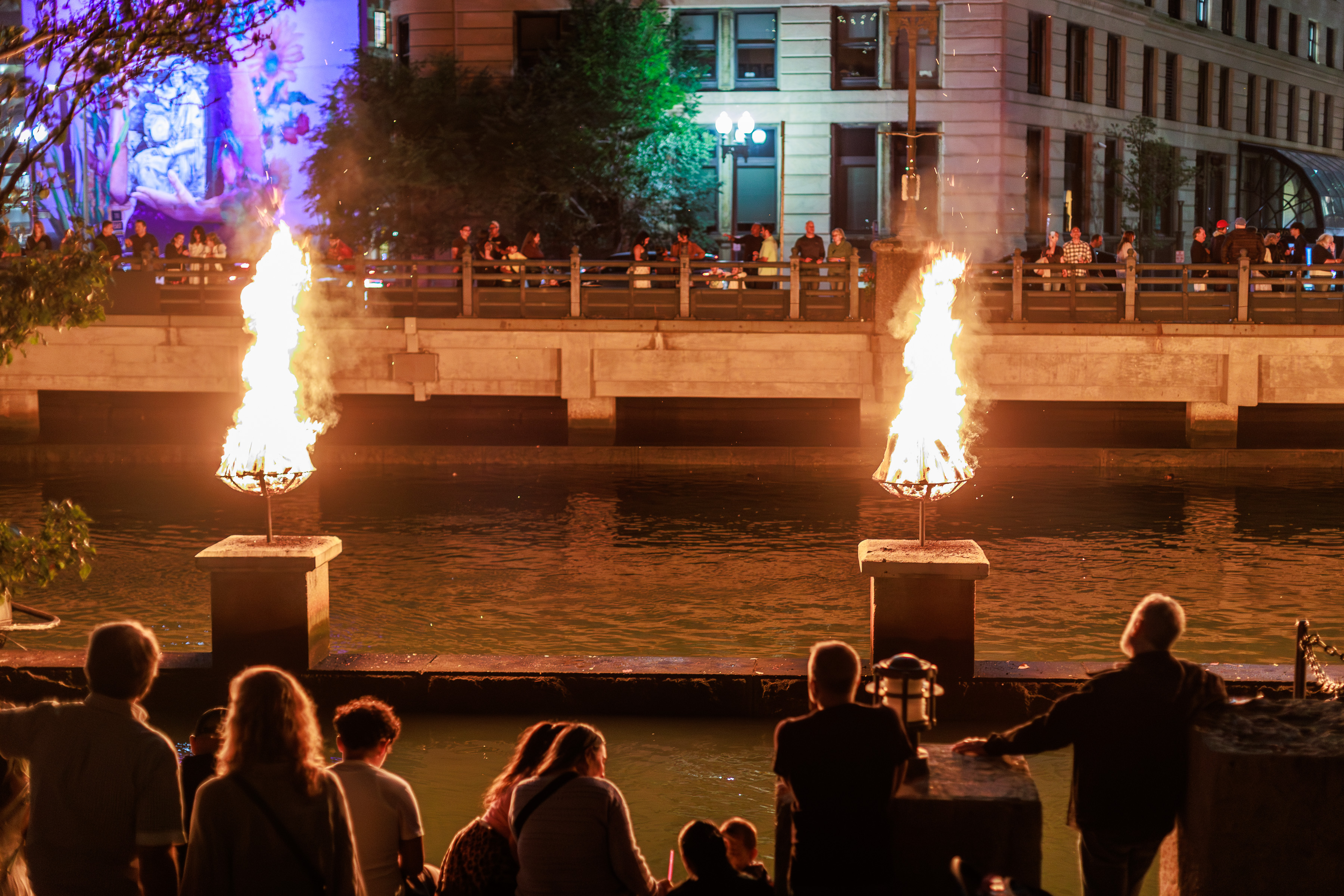
People line the river to quietly sit and watch the burning braziers

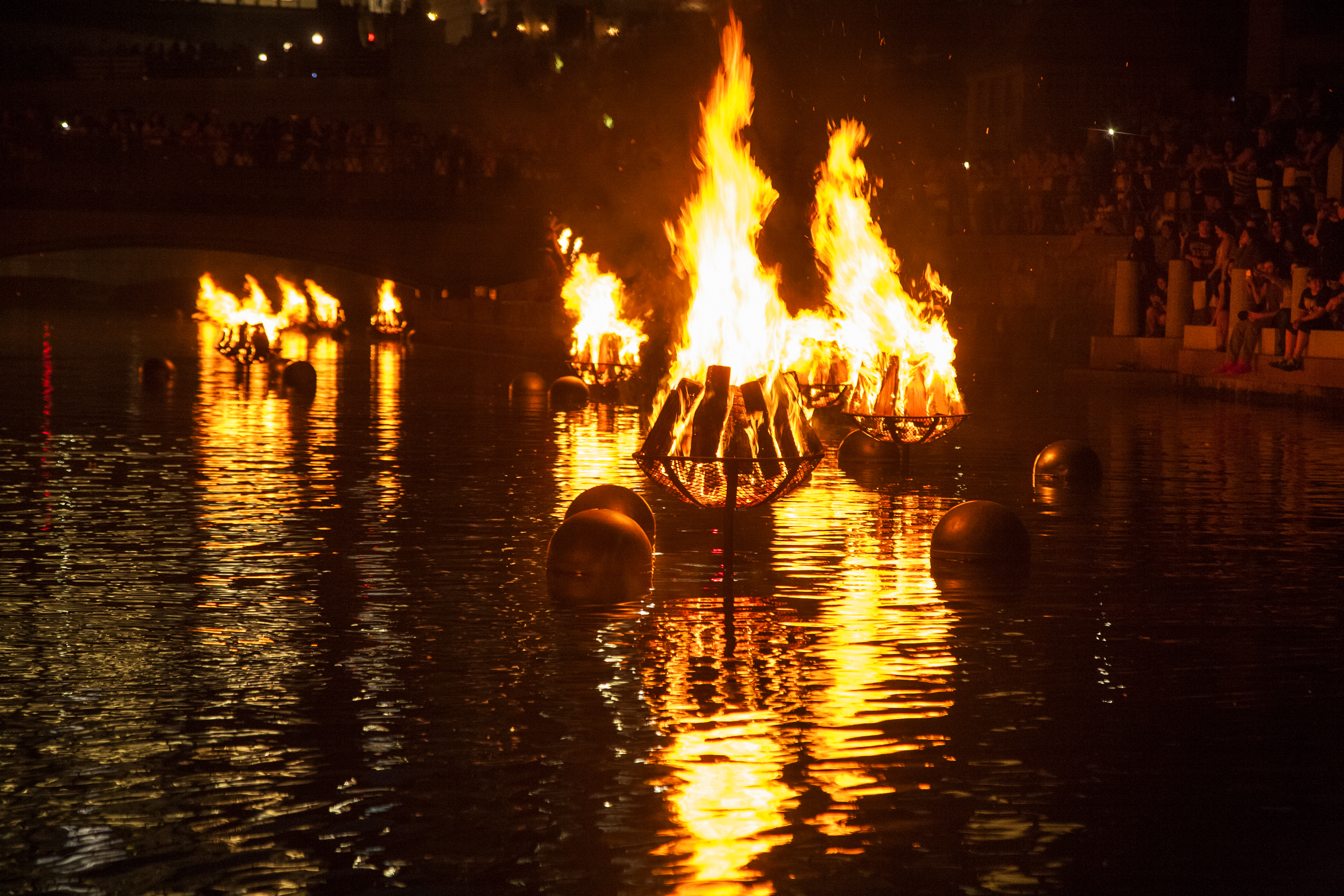
The bonfires as seen from the water during the June 13, 2015 lighting
