= Barnaby Evans =

American artist

- Born: 1953 (age 72–73); U.S.
- Education: Brown University
- Known for: WaterFire installation in Providence, Rhode Island
- Style: Site-specific sculpture, Photography, Film, Garden Design, Architectural Projects

Barnaby Evans (born 1953) is an American artist who works in many media including site-specific sculpture installations, photography, film, garden design, architectural projects, writing and conceptual works. Evans is known for WaterFire, a sculpture that he installed on the three rivers of downtown Providence, Rhode Island.

== Work ==
His original training was in the sciences, but he has been working exclusively as an artist for more than twenty-five years.

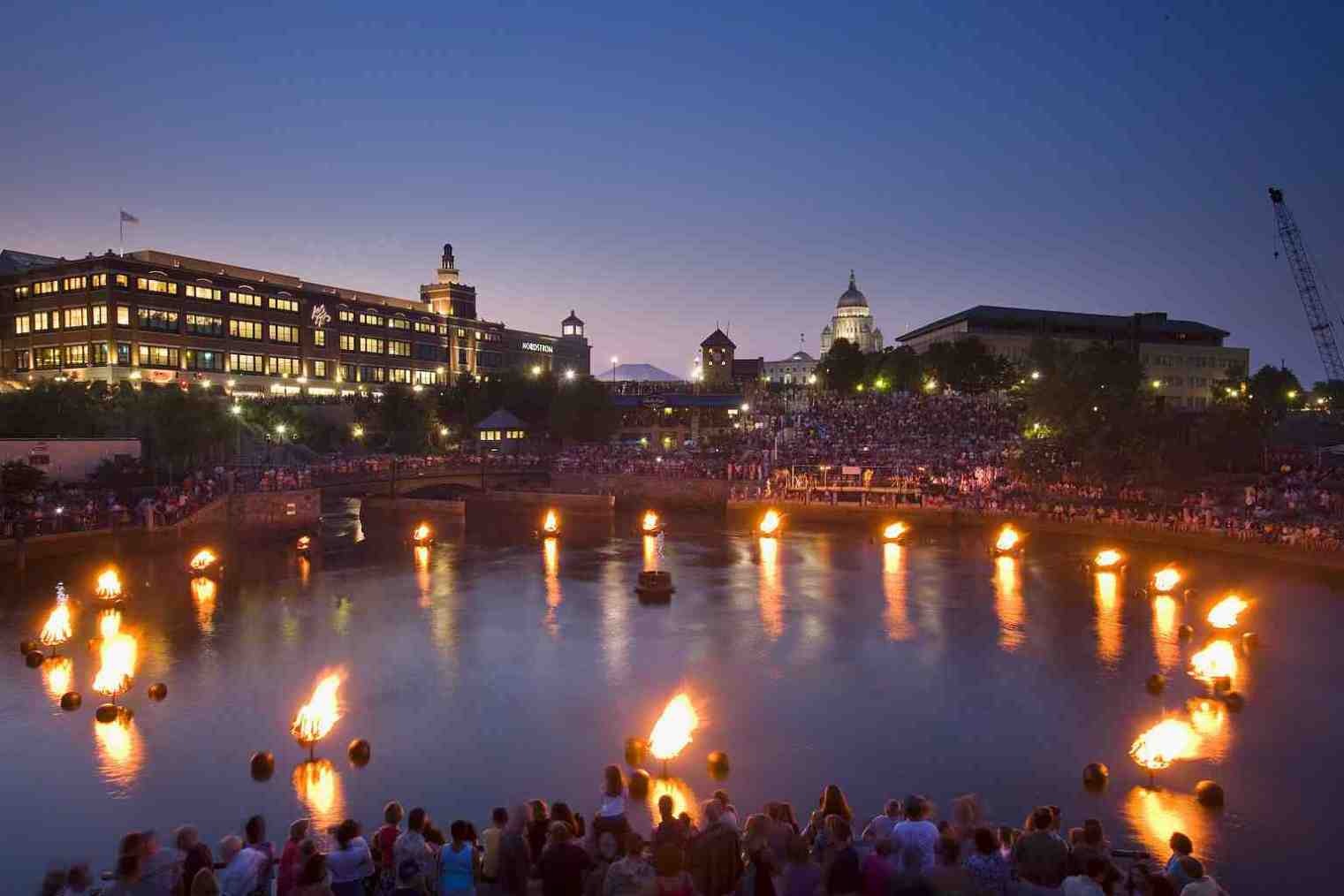
The view of the City of Providence during WaterFire from Waterplace Park

In 1994, he created First Fire to celebrate the tenth anniversary of First Night Providence; in June 1996, he created Second Fire for the International Sculpture Conference and the Convergence International Arts Festival in Providence. With hundreds of volunteers and the broad support of the community he established WaterFire as an ongoing installation in 1997. Evans also created WaterFire Houston in 1998 and installed Moving Water for the Institute of Contemporary Art's Vita Brevis Program in Boston in 2001. Among other installation works, Barnaby Evans created Temple to Milk in 1989, Protecting the Flag in 1990, Execution Coda (with artist Irene Lawrence) in 1993, and Solstice Courtyard in 1997. Evans created Rikyu's Second Dream for the Rhode Island School of Design Museum of Art for the summer of 1999, a related work, 613 Lengths of Bamboo, at the Brattleboro Museum of Art, and Heart of Glass for the Museum of Glass in Tacoma, Washington, both in 2001. Evans is currently exploring art installations for a number of other cities including St. Petersburg, Barcelona, and Seoul.

Barnaby Evans is also known for his photography which is included in the permanent collections of the Victoria and Albert Museum, London; the Bibliothèque nationale, Paris; the Musee' d'art et d'histoire, Fribourg, Switzerland; the Addison Gallery of American Art, Andover, Massachusetts; and the Museum of Art, Rhode Island School of Design among others. His photographs have also been nationally and internationally exhibited and published in Camera, Lucerne, Switzerland; Photokina, Cologne, Germany; Photography Annual, New York; and Schweizerische Photorundschau / Revue Suisse de Photographie.

Barnaby Evans received his bachelor's degree in biology and environmental science from Brown University in 1975, where he was a member of the Brown Association for Cooperative Housing. He was awarded an honorary Doctorate of Humanities by Brown University and an honorary Doctorate of Fine Arts by Rhode Island College, both in 2000. Evans has also received the Aaron Siskind Fellowship in Photography, several fellowships from the Rhode Island State Council on the Arts, the Silver Prize for Colour Photography at the International Triennial Exhibition (in Switzerland) and Providence's Renaissance Award in 1997. Evans received the 2003 Kevin Lynch Award from the Massachusetts Institute of Technology, and WaterFire was honored with the 2003 Rudy Bruner Award for Urban Excellence silver medal from the Bruner Foundation, given to Providence for the renaissance of its downtown. Evans has lectured at many universities including Brown University, the Rhode Island School of Design, MIT, Harvard, Cornell, McGill, and the University of Barcelona. Evans was a 2003/2004 Artist in Residence at MIT where he co-taught a course at the Department of Urban Studies with the late Mark Schuster at MIT on the impact of ephemera on the urban environment. In 2008 Evans created a new work on the Boston Common for First Night Boston. Evans was inducted into the Rhode Island Heritage Hall of Fame in 2011.
