= James D. Hathaway House =

Historic house in Massachusetts, United States

- U.S. National Register of Historic Places
- U.S. Historic district – Contributing property
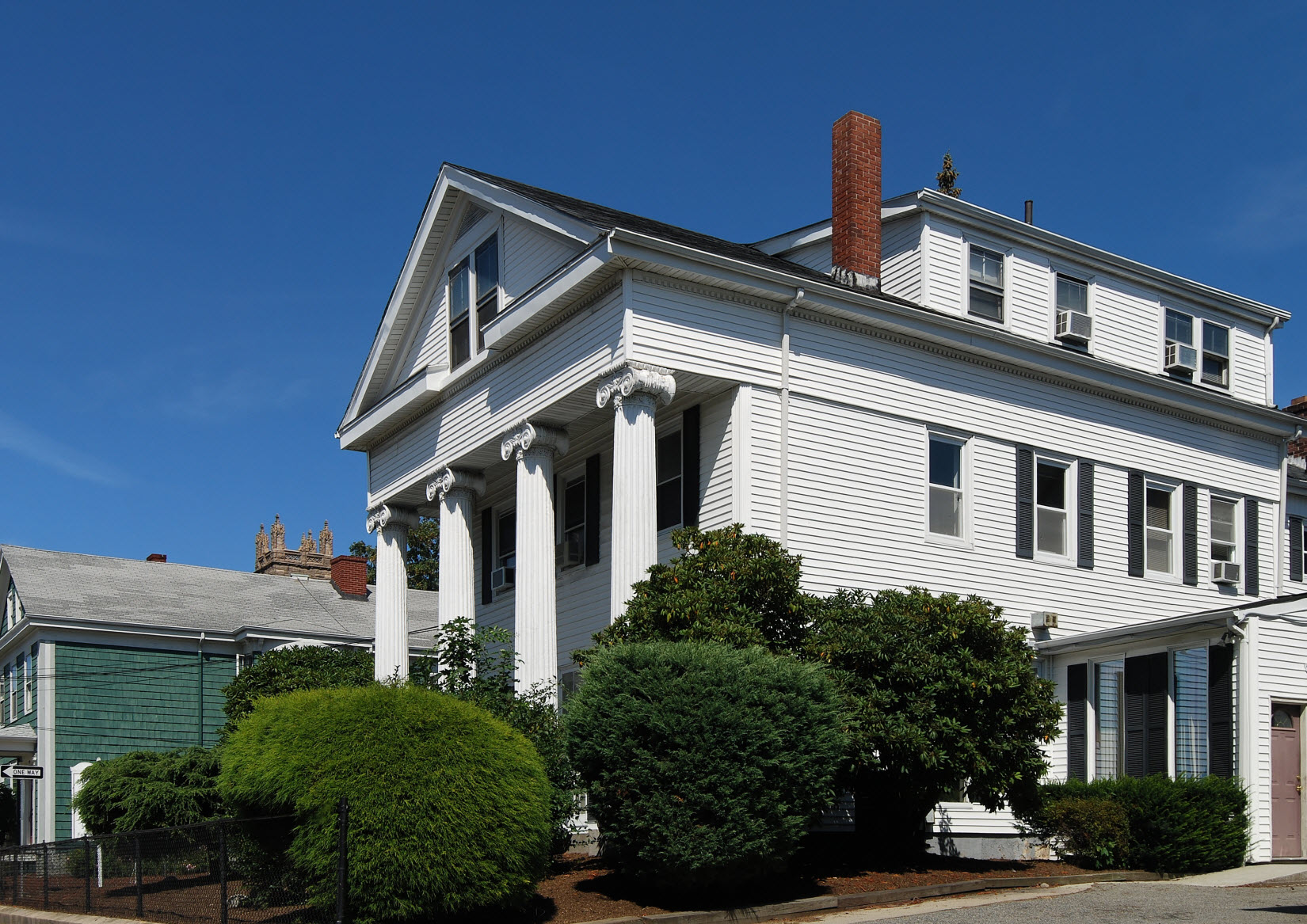

- Location within Massachusetts Location within the United States
- Location: 311 Pine St., Fall River, Massachusetts
- Coordinates: 41°42′15.3″N 71°9′11.9″W
- Built: 1843
- Architect: Warren, Russell
- Architectural style: Greek Revival
- Part of: Lower Highlands Historic District (ID84002171)
- MPS: Fall River MRA
- NRHP reference No.: 83000676

Significant dates
- Added to NRHP: February 16, 1983
- Designated CP: January 10, 1984

The James D. Hathaway House is a historic house located at 311 Pine Street in Fall River, Massachusetts.

== Description and history ==
It is a 2 1/2-story, wood-framed structure, three bays wide, with a front-gable roof and a flush-boarded facade sheltered by a monumental two-story, Greek Revival style portico with fluted Ionic columns. It was built in 1843 by James D. Hathaway, a carpenter, and was perhaps designed by Russell Warren or copied by Hathaway from his designs. It is one of seven extant monumental temple-fronted Greek Revival houses in Fall River. It is also located within the Lower Highlands Historic District.

The house was added to the National Register of Historic Places in 1983. It currently functions as a law office.

== See also ==
- National Register of Historic Places listings in Fall River, Massachusetts
- William Lindsey House (Fall River, Massachusetts)
- John Mace Smith House
- Osborn House
