= William Lindsey House =

William Lindsey House may refer to:

- William Lindsey House (Fall River, Massachusetts), listed on the National Register of Historic Places in Bristol County, Massachusetts
- William Lindsey House (Yakima, Washington), listed on the National Register of Historic Places in Yakima County, Washington
