= Benjamin Barker House =

Historic house in Rhode Island, United States

- U.S. National Register of Historic Places
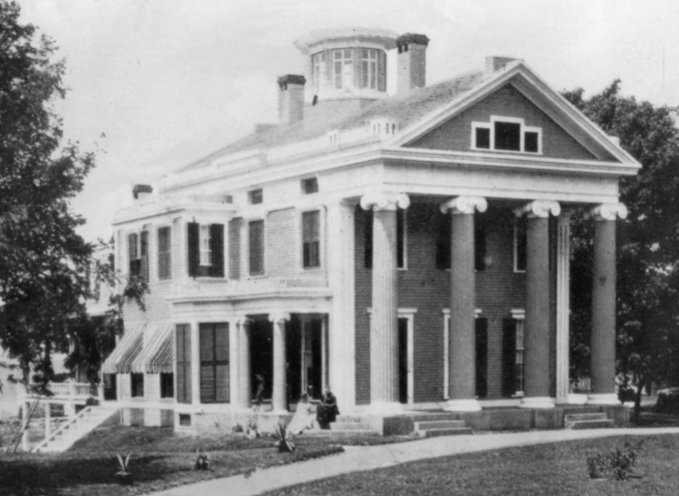
- c. 1905 postcard view of house

- Location within Rhode Island Location within the United States
- Location: Tiverton, Rhode Island
- Coordinates: 41°38′30″N 71°12′19″W
- Built: 1850
- Architect: Warren, Russell
- Architectural style: Greek Revival
- NRHP reference No.: 80000081
- Added to NRHP: October 31, 1980

The Benjamin Barker House was a historic house on Main Road in Tiverton, Rhode Island. Built c. 1850, it was a two-story wood-frame structure with an impressive Greek Temple front, with full-height fluted Ionic columns supporting a full triangular pediment. The pediment (as did the gable at the opposite end of the house) had an astylistic triple window in it. The roof was topped by an octagonal cupola with belvedere, with two narrow chimneys piercing the ridge line. It is possible the house was designed by Russell Warren, who is documented to have designed a number of other high-style Greek Revival houses in the region. The purchaser is believed to be Benjamin Barker, a lumber merchant operating in nearby Fall River, Massachusetts.

The house was listed on the National Register of Historic Places in 1980, after it was extensively destroyed by fire. It was demolished in 1981. The property it stood on, at the northwest corner of the junction of Main Road and Rhode Island Route 24, was associated with The Coachman, a restaurant, and is now the site of an assisted living facility.

== See also ==
- National Register of Historic Places listings in Newport County, Rhode Island
