= Levi H. Gale House =

Historic house in Rhode Island, United States

- U.S. National Register of Historic Places
- U.S. National Historic Landmark District – Contributing property
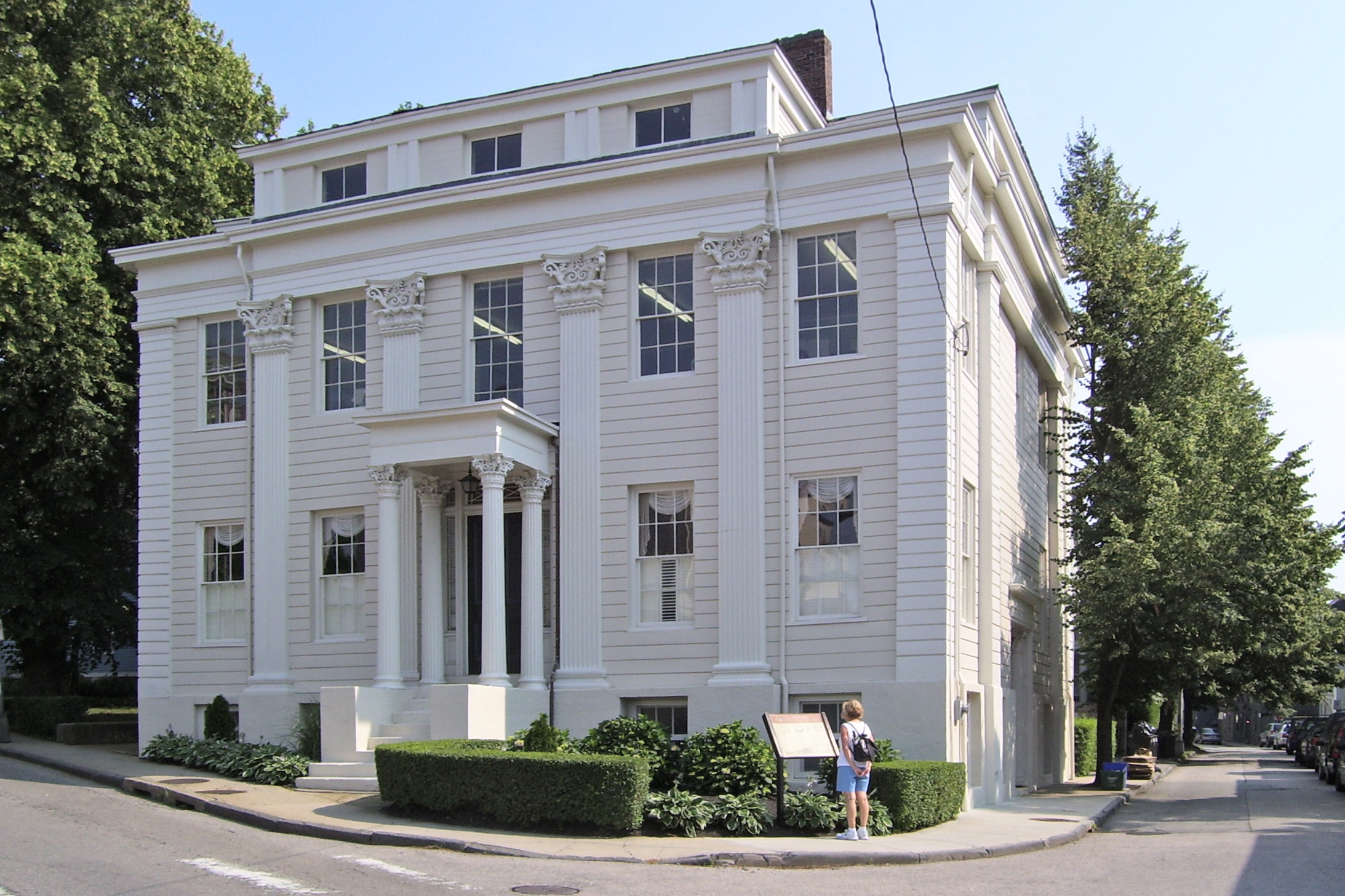

- Location within Rhode Island Location within the United States
- Location: Newport, Rhode Island
- Coordinates: 41°29′22″N 71°18′44″W
- Part of: Newport Historic District (ID68000001)
- NRHP reference No.: 71000022

Significant dates
- Added to NRHP: May 6, 1971
- Designated NHLDCP: November 24, 1968

The Levi H. Gale House is a historic house at 85 Touro Street in Newport, Rhode Island, United States.

Russell Warren designed the house, which was built in 1835 for attorney Levi Gale. In 1925–26 the building was moved from its original location on Washington Square because of the erection of the Courthouse. By direction of the Rhode Island General Assembly, the Abraham Touro Fund paid to move the building and preserve it for use as a Jewish Community Center. The house is now located at the corner of Touro and Division Street. The Levi Gale House was added to the National Register of Historic Places in 1971 and continues to be used as a Jewish community center.

== See also ==
- National Register of Historic Places listings in Newport County, Rhode Island.
