= Longfield (Bristol, Rhode Island) =

Historic house in Bristol, Rhode Island, US

- U.S. National Register of Historic Places
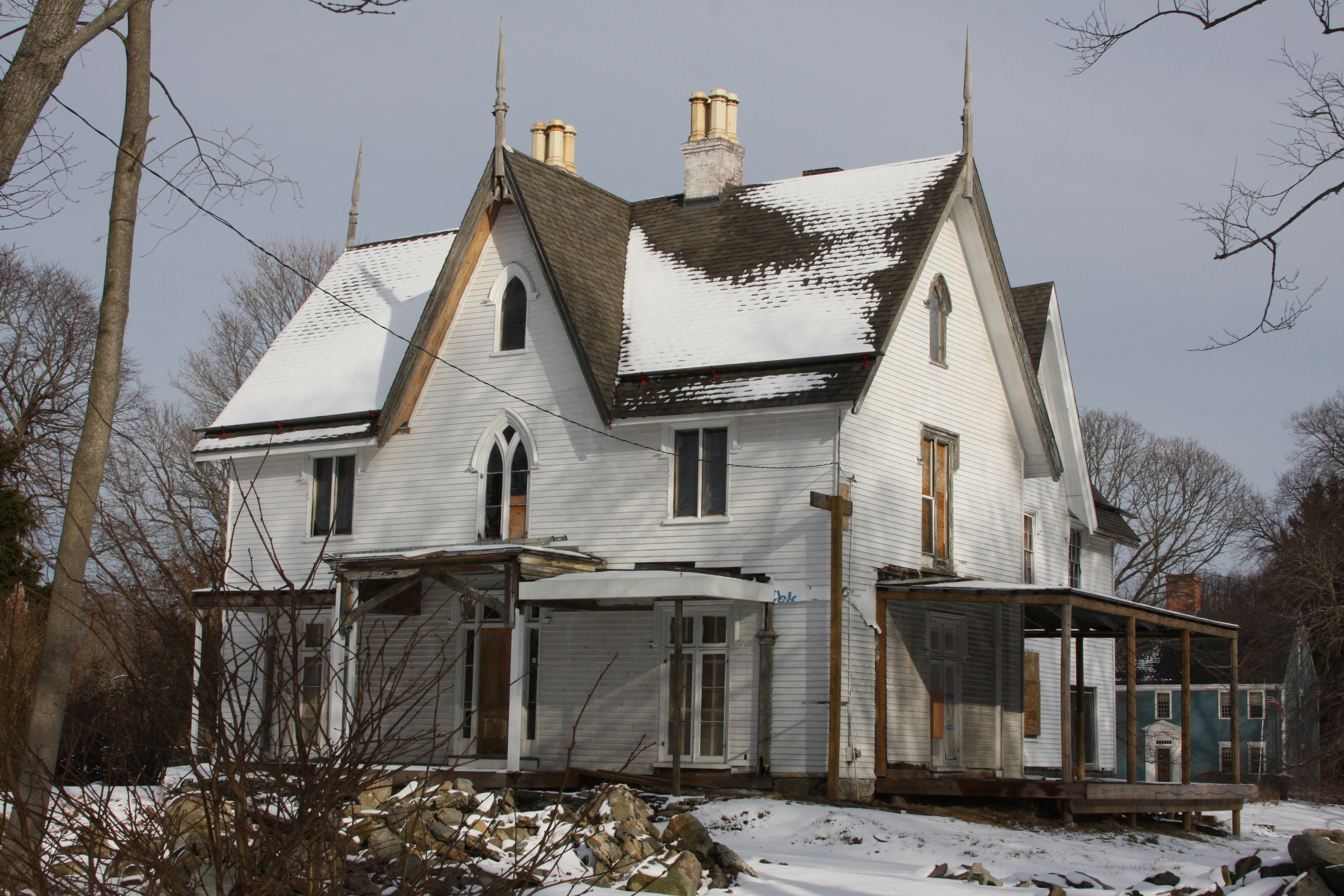
- Location: Bristol, Rhode Island
- Coordinates: 41°41′49″N 71°16′47″W
- Built: 1848
- Architect: Russell Warren & Son
- Architectural style: Gothic Revival
- NRHP reference No.: 72000016
- Added to NRHP: July 17, 1972

Longfield (or Charles Dana Gibson House) is an historic house at 1200 Hope Street in Bristol, Rhode Island.

== History ==
The large house was designed in 1848 by architects Russell Warren & Son on sixty acres of DeWolf family land; it was given to Charles Dana Gibson (the grandfather of the famous artist and namesake) upon his marriage to Abbey DeWolf, the daughter of the late US Senator James DeWolf. Warren had built many other important buildings in Bristol for the DeWolf family, who rose to prominence through wealth gained from the Atlantic slave trade.

In 1901, the house was passed down from Abbey DeWolf Gibson to granddaughter Josephine Gibson, who became the longtime chatelaine of the estate. Josephine was one of the models of the "Gibson Girl" illustrated by her brother, named Charles Dana Gibson after their paternal grandfather.

Josephine Gibson married a Mr. Knowlton and made Longfield a center of social and artistic gatherings until her death in 1969. Her son, bookbinder Daniel Gibson Knowlton, sold the house in 1972. In May of that year, it was nominated to the National Register of Historic Places. The property includes smaller houses and cottages, originally constructed to house servants and caretakers.

Knowlton built an adjacent home and bookbindery, named Longfield Studio, on the property at 1202 Hope Street.

The property has been sold several times since it passed out of the family. Various owners announced intentions to convert the property to a single-family house, a "green inn", a place for weddings and functions, or an artists' residency. In the early 21st century, renovations were begun, then halted, and the property was sold twice in 2012. By January 2014 the structure was seriously neglected and derelict, missing windows and the porch floor. Its future is uncertain.

There is a nearly identical house, built c. 1845, at 64 Kay Street in Newport.

== Architecture ==
The house is a slightly altered example of Gothic Revival architecture interpreted in wood. According to a National Park Service survey, the foundation of the house is of stuccoed stone and the walls are constructed of wood clapboards. The house has four chimneys. The original cut-out bargeboard trim was removed from the gables around 1907. The front porch was rebuilt with a steeper shingled roof and its Gothic bracing and wooden crockets were removed. The Gothic window over the front porch may have had its sill-level raised. The south side porch was enlarged from a half-octagon shaped protrusion, which had been accessible from only the south parlor window. Its Gothic balustrade, bracing and parapet railing were kept. The original exterior window blinds of the house are stored in the attic. The rear entrance porch was rebuilt in 1963. The original partition separating the front southwest bedroom from a dressing room was removed. The house originally had a wood-shingled roof and was painted light red with darker trim. As of 1979, the house was painted white with black trim.

== Literature ==
Josephine Gibson Knowlton and Andrea Hurley recorded the history of the house and the family in a number of books.

- Longfield: The House on the Neck (1956)
- Butterballs and Finger Bowls (1960)
- What a Life: The Incredible Story of Josephine "Dadie" Jordan (2004)
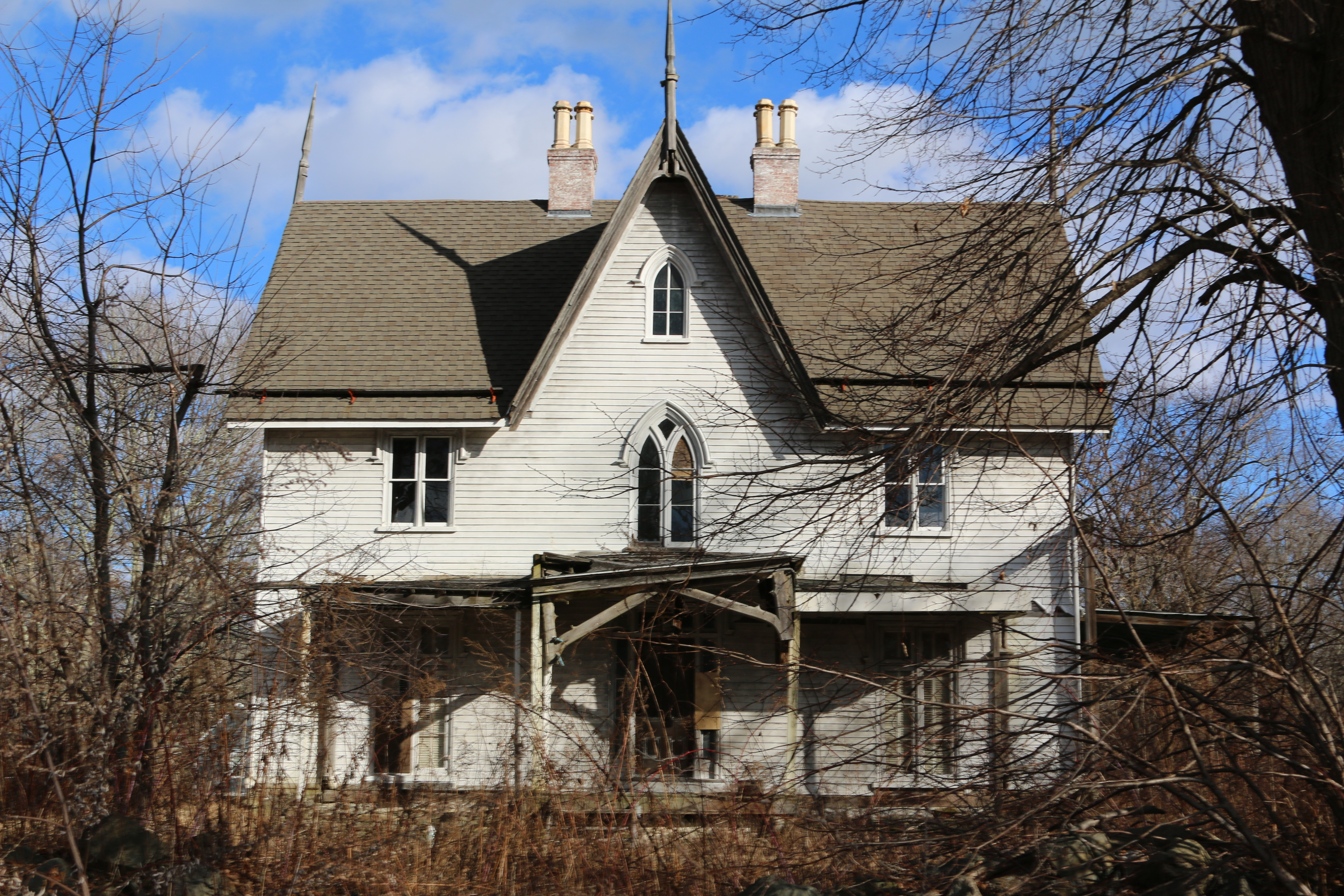
Front

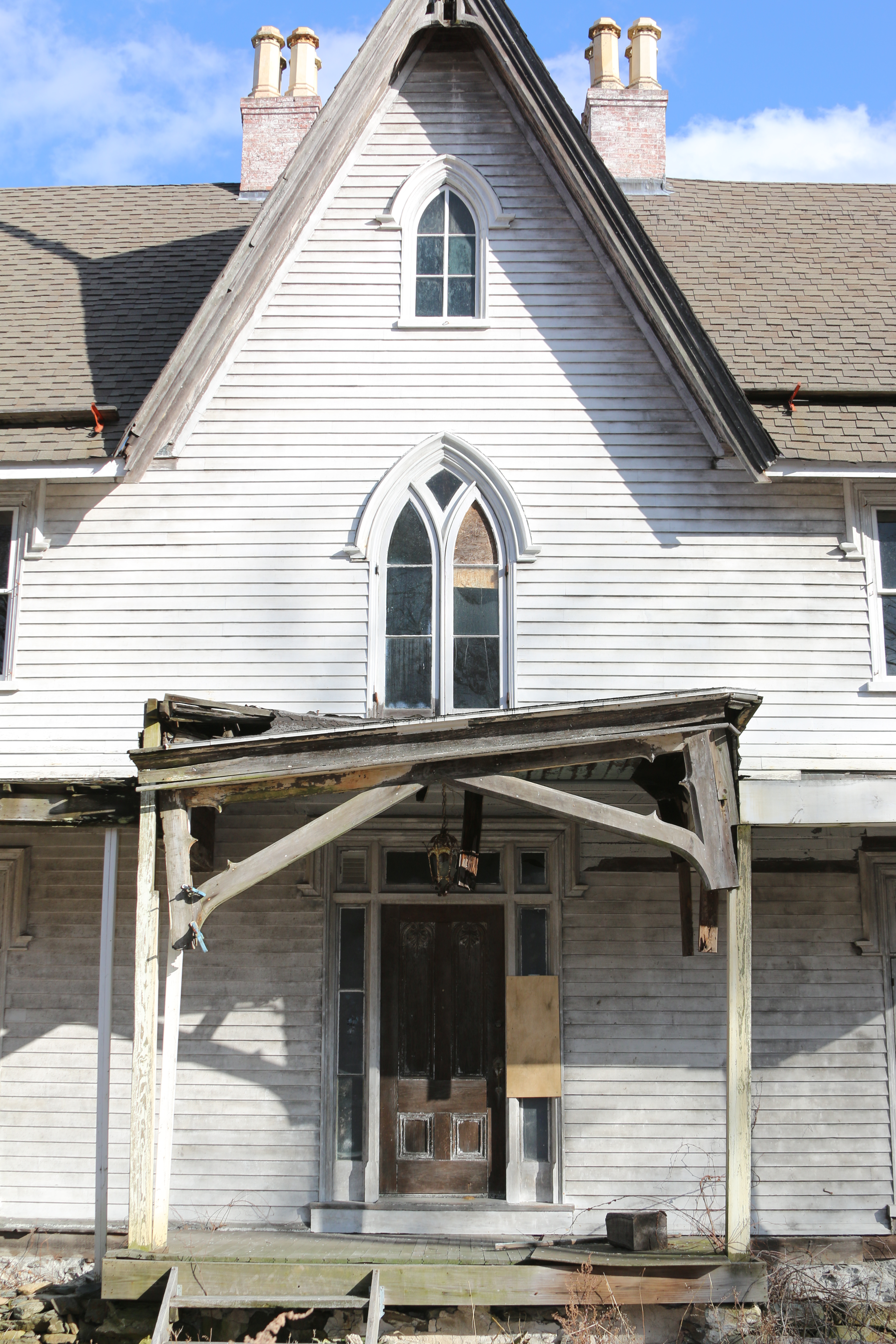
Porch Close Up

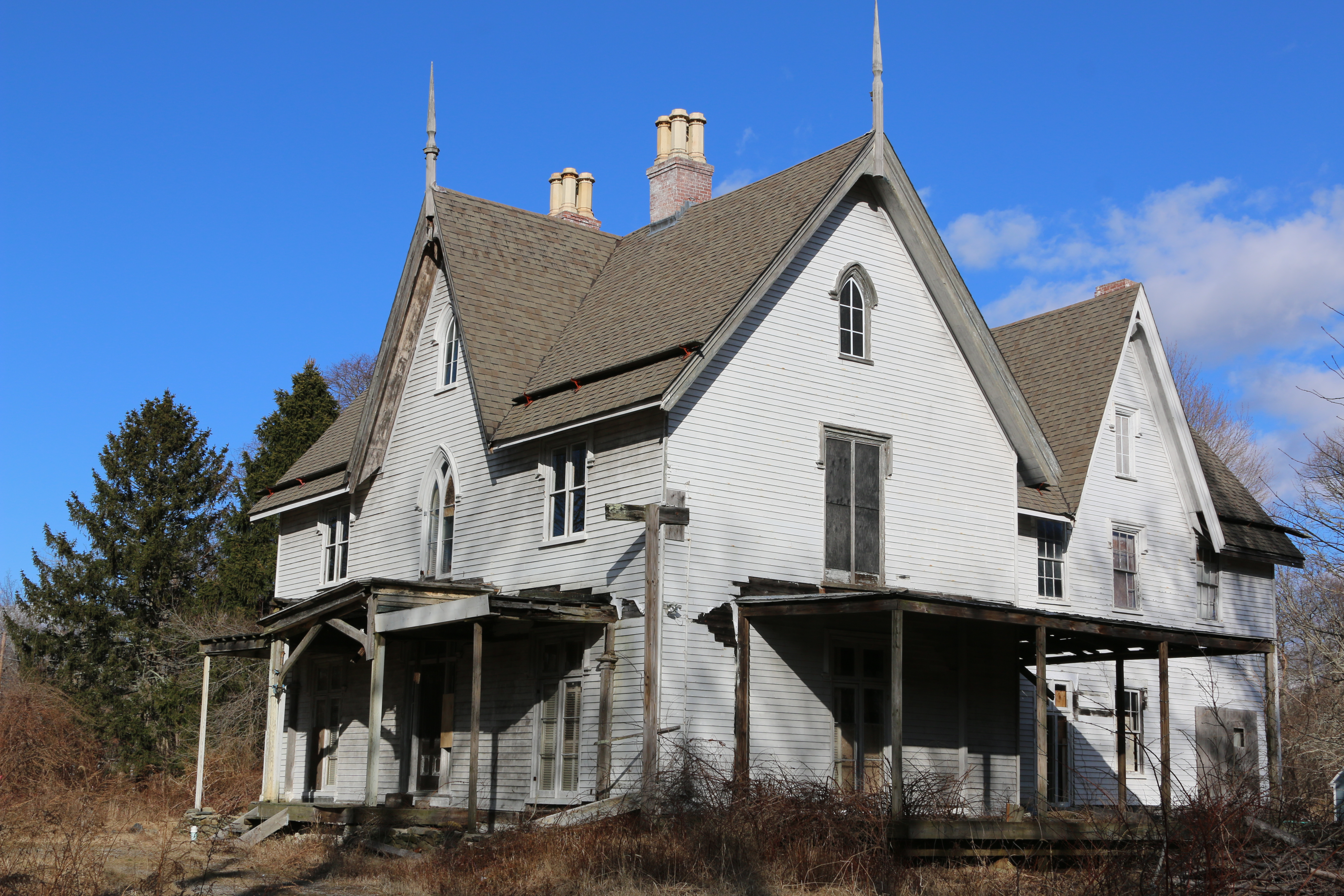
Side View

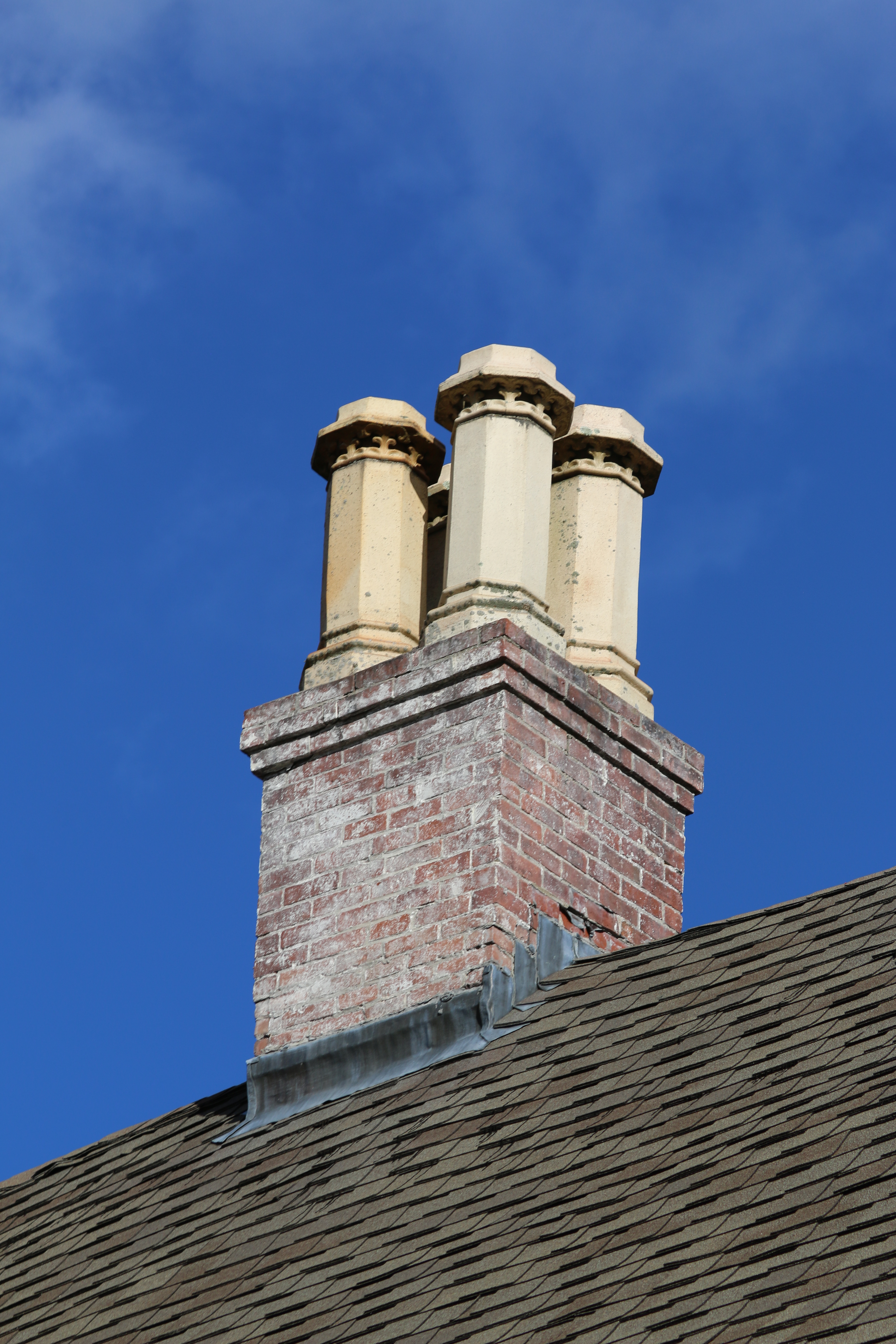
Chimney

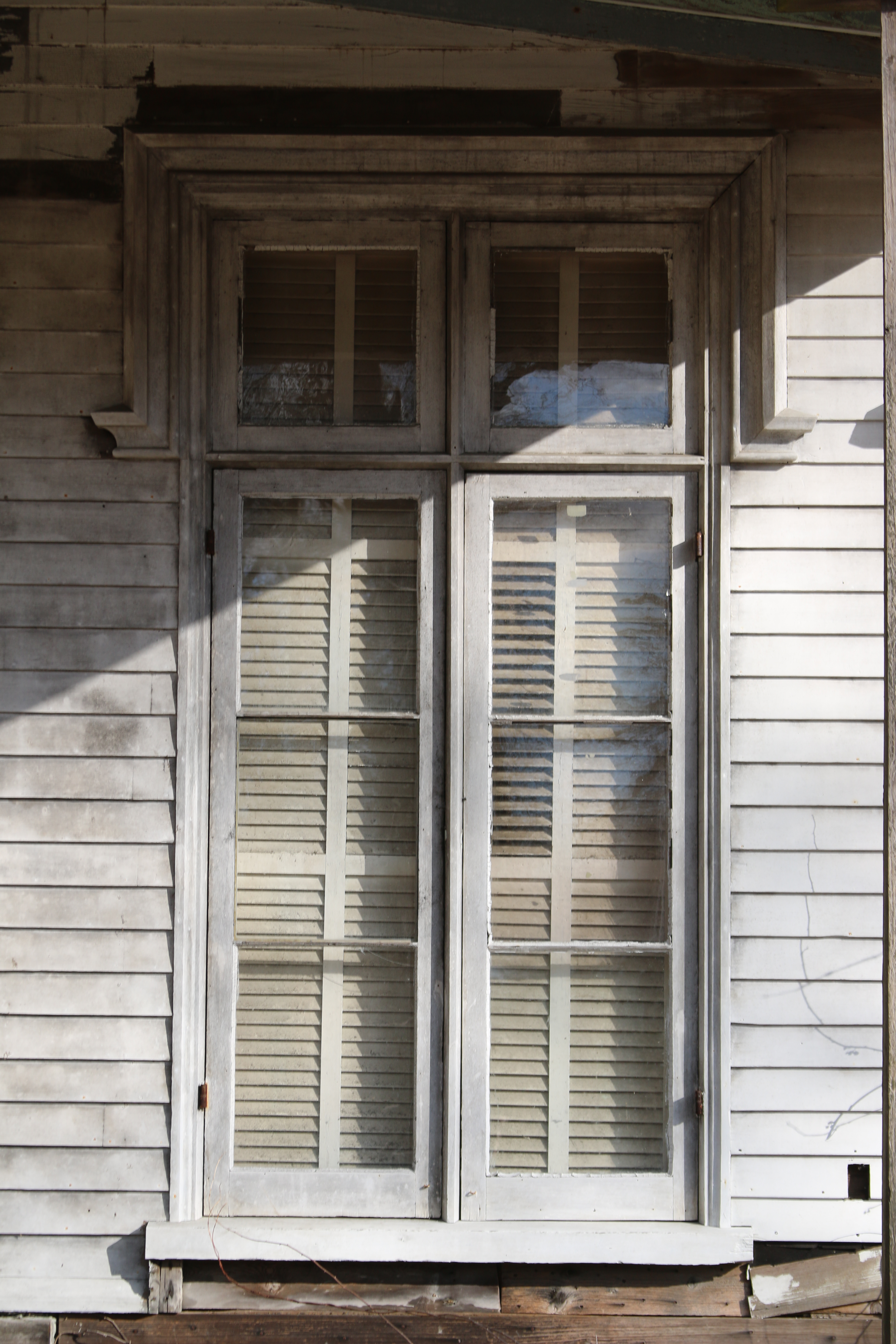
Front Window

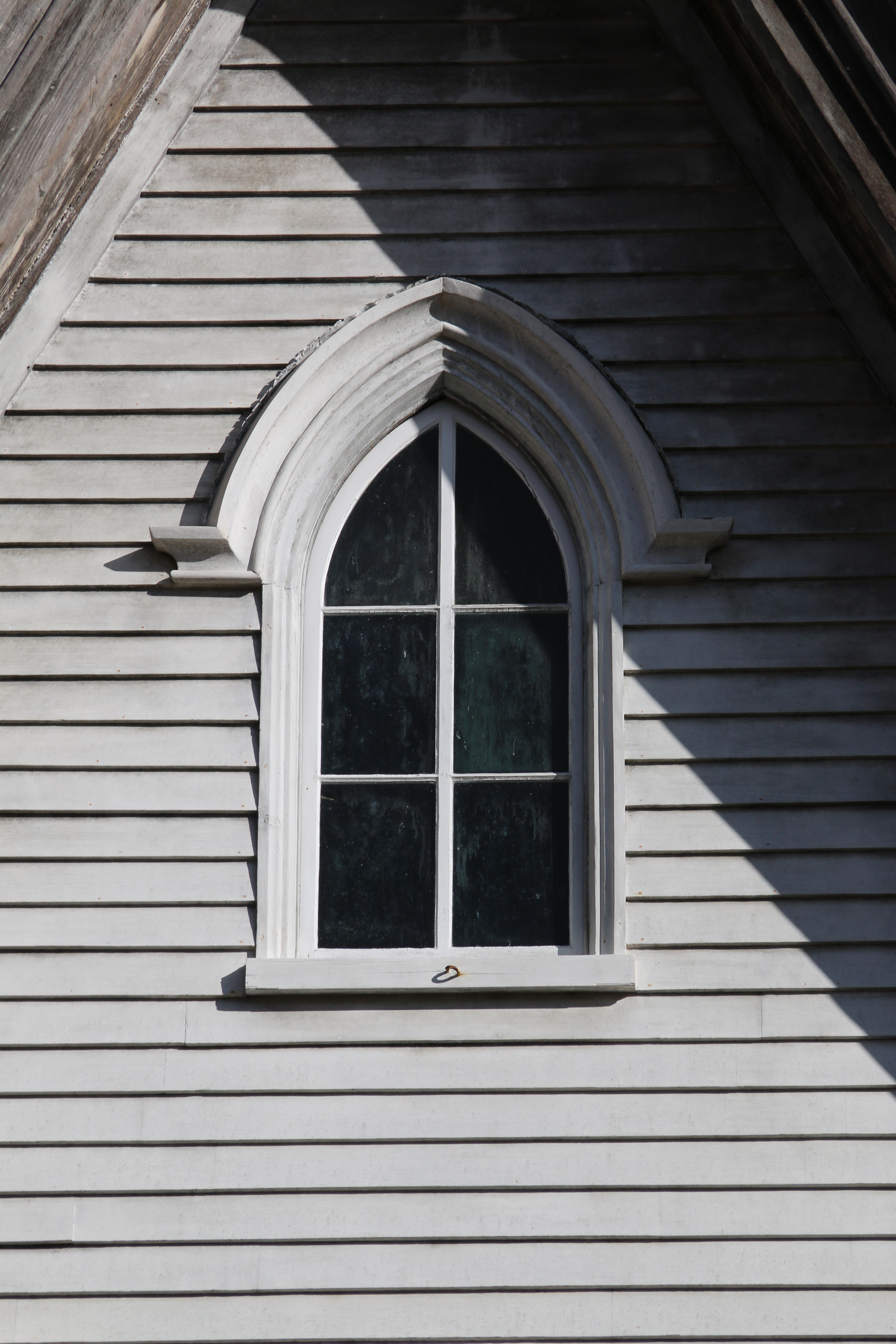
Small Window

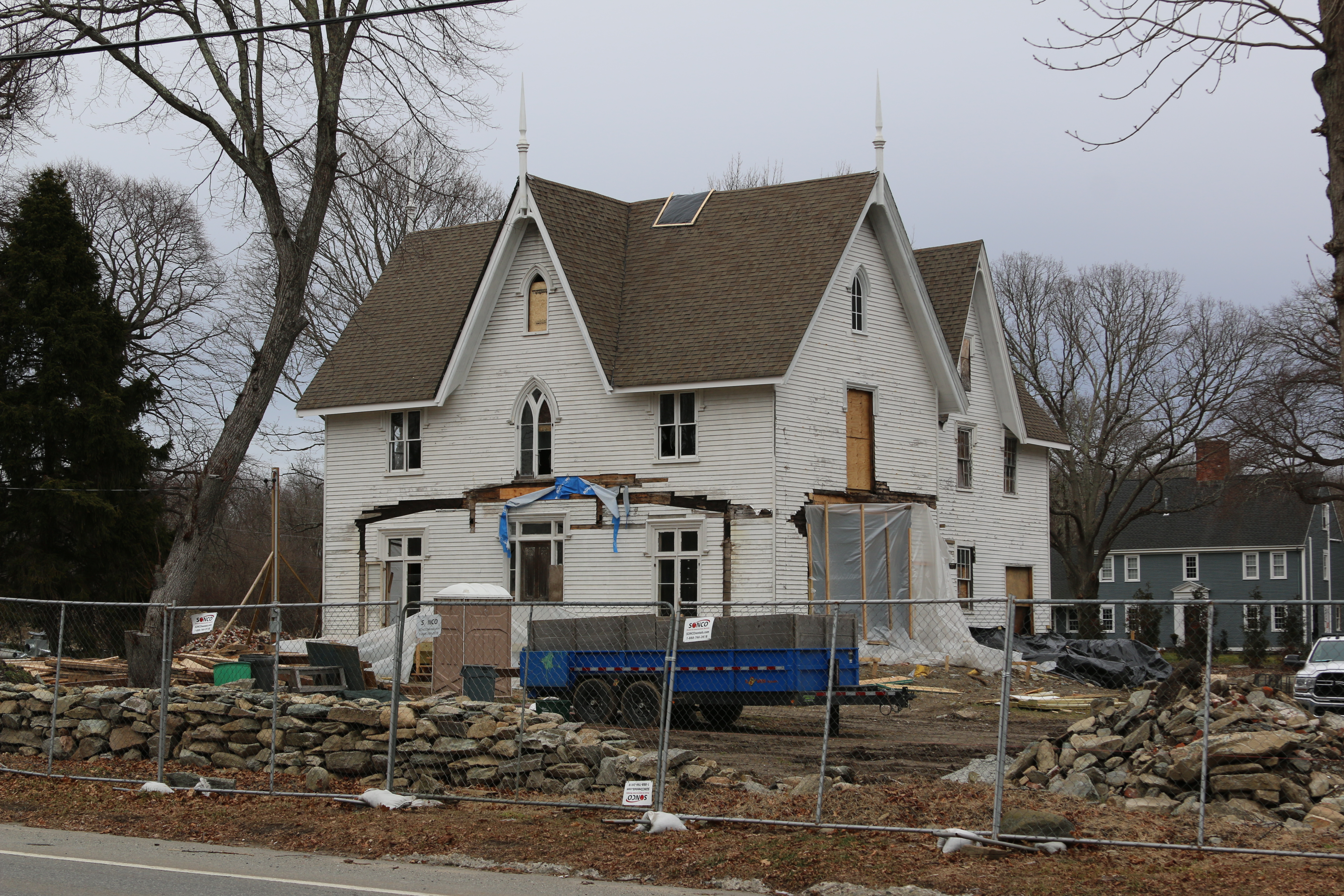
January 2023 renovation

== See also ==
- National Register of Historic Places listings in Bristol County, Rhode Island
