= William Lindsey House (Fall River, Massachusetts) =

Historic house in Massachusetts, United States

- U.S. National Register of Historic Places
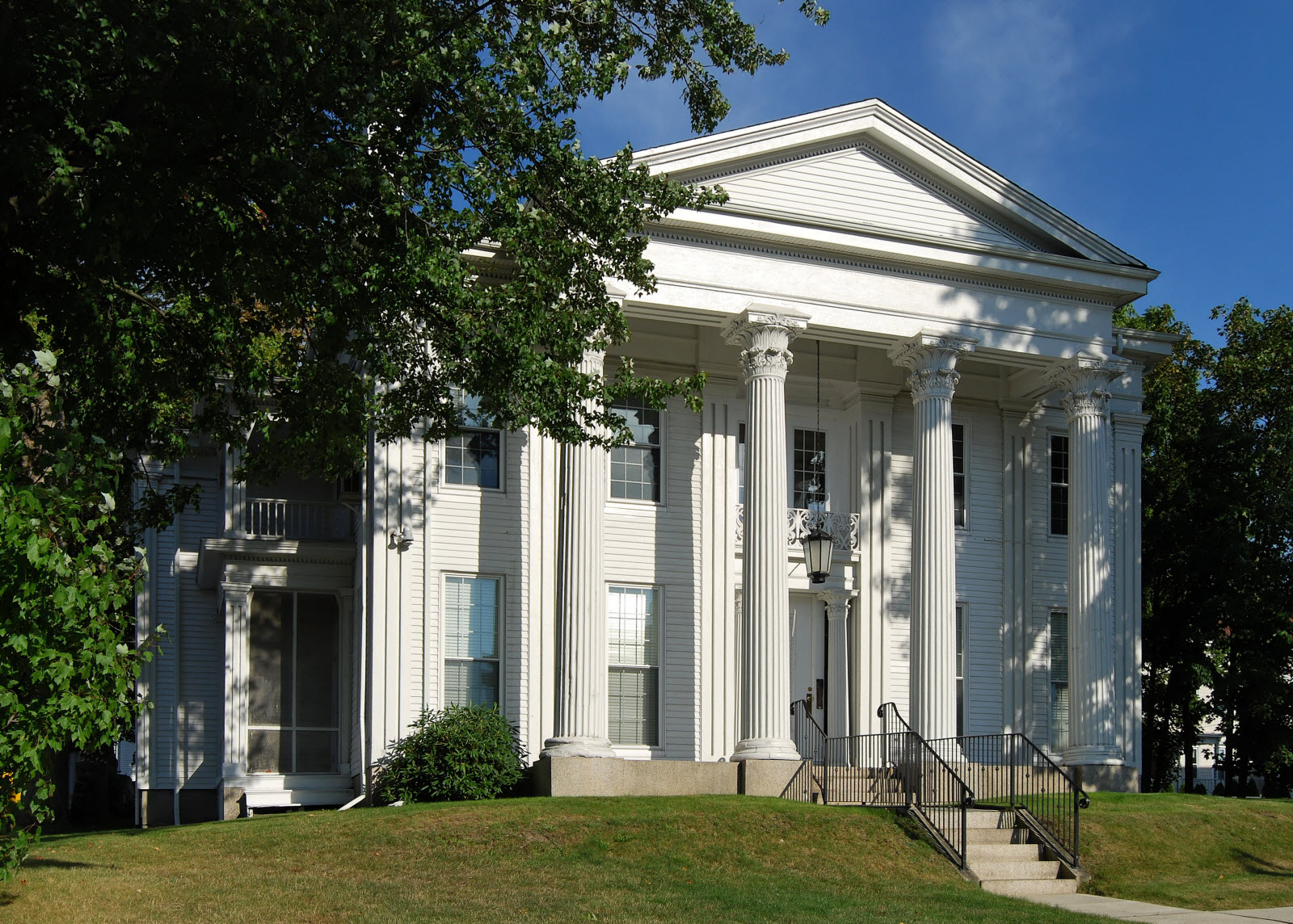

- Location within Massachusetts Location within the United States
- Location: Fall River, Massachusetts
- Coordinates: 41°42′25.3″N 71°9′15.5″W
- Built: 1844
- Architect: Russell Warren
- Architectural style: Greek Revival
- MPS: Fall River MRA
- NRHP reference No.: 83000690
- Added to NRHP: February 16, 1983

The William Lindsey House is a historic house located at 373 North Main Street in Fall River, Massachusetts. It was designed by Rhode Island architect Russell Warren in 1844 for William Lindsey, a local merchant. It is one of seven extant monumental temple-fronted Greek Revival houses in Fall River, along with the John Mace Smith House next door. It is a 2 1/2-story wood-frame structure, five bays wide, with a hip roof topped by an octagonal cupola. The Greek temple front consists of a fully pedimented gable and entablature supported by four fluted Corinthian columns.

The house was added to the National Register of Historic Places in 1983. It is used for law offices.

== See also ==
- National Register of Historic Places listings in Fall River, Massachusetts
- List of historic houses in Massachusetts
