= Osborn House =

Historic house in Massachusetts, United States

- U.S. National Register of Historic Places
- U.S. Historic district – Contributing property
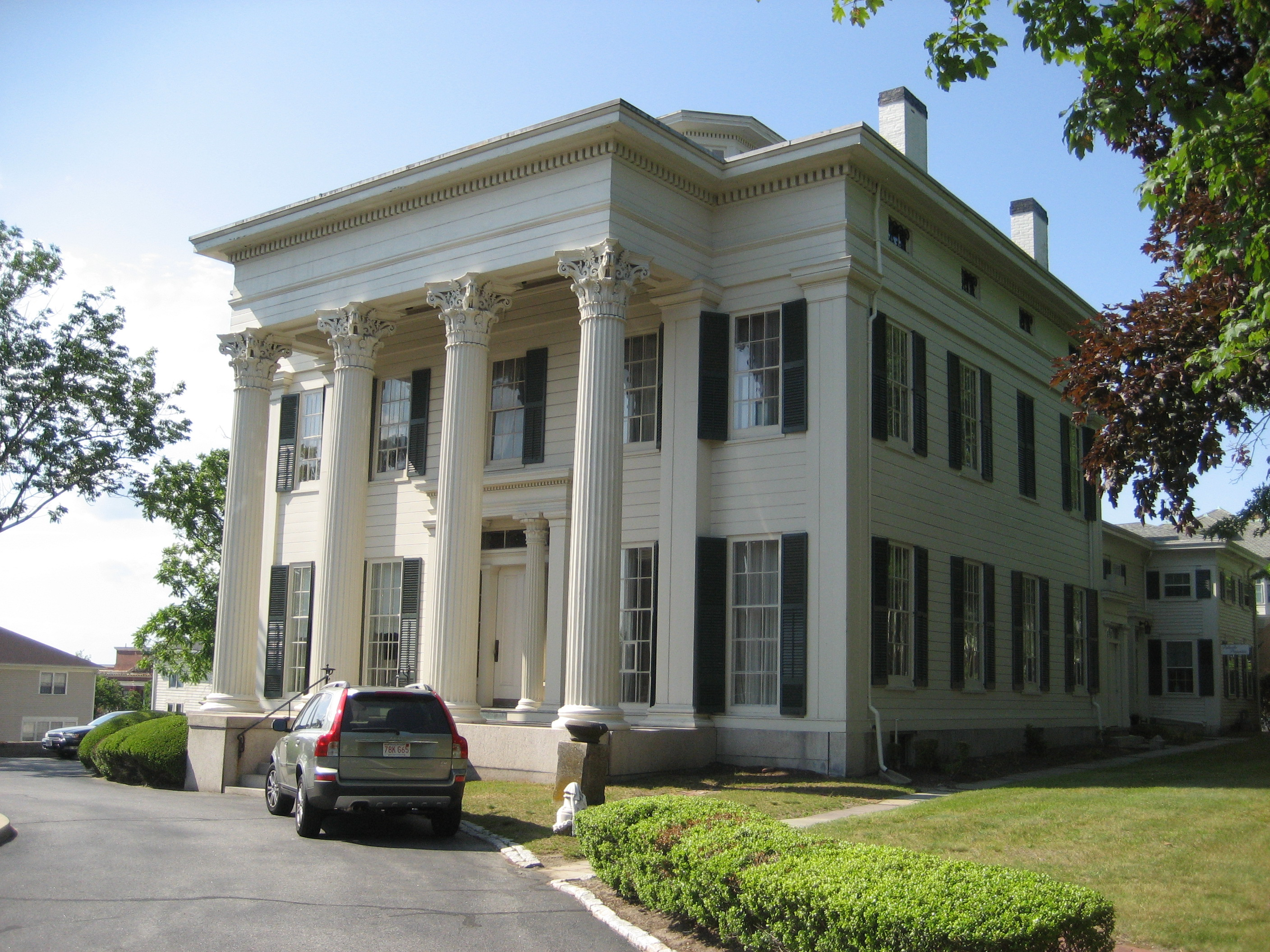
- Carr-Osborn House

- Location within Massachusetts Location within the United States
- Location: 456 Rock St., Fall River, Massachusetts
- Coordinates: 41°42′28″N 71°9′7″W
- Built: 1843
- Architect: Warren, Russell
- Architectural style: Greek Revival
- Part of: Highlands Historic District (ID83000677)
- NRHP reference No.: 80000431

Significant dates
- Added to NRHP: April 4, 1980
- Designated CP: February 16, 1983

The Osborn House is a historic house at 456 Rock Street in Fall River, Massachusetts, built in the Greek Revival style.

== Description and history ==
The house was designed by Rhode Island architect Russell Warren for Joseph Durfee in 1843. Four years after the house was built, Joseph Durfee died, and the house was then occupied by his daughter Elizabeth who had married William Carr in 1848. In 1880 the Carr's daughter Delia married James Osborn. The house remained in the Osborn family until 1951 when it was given to the Presbyterian Church, next door.

The church sold the house in 1977 to Federico Santi & John Gacher who restored the house and had it placed on the National Register of Historic Places in 1980. They sold the house in 1985.

Today, the house is occupied by several offices, and is commonly known as the Carr-Osborn House.

== See also ==
- National Register of Historic Places listings in Fall River, Massachusetts
- Highlands Historic District (Fall River, Massachusetts)
- List of historic houses in Massachusetts
