= John Mace Smith House =

Historic house in Massachusetts, United States

- U.S. National Register of Historic Places
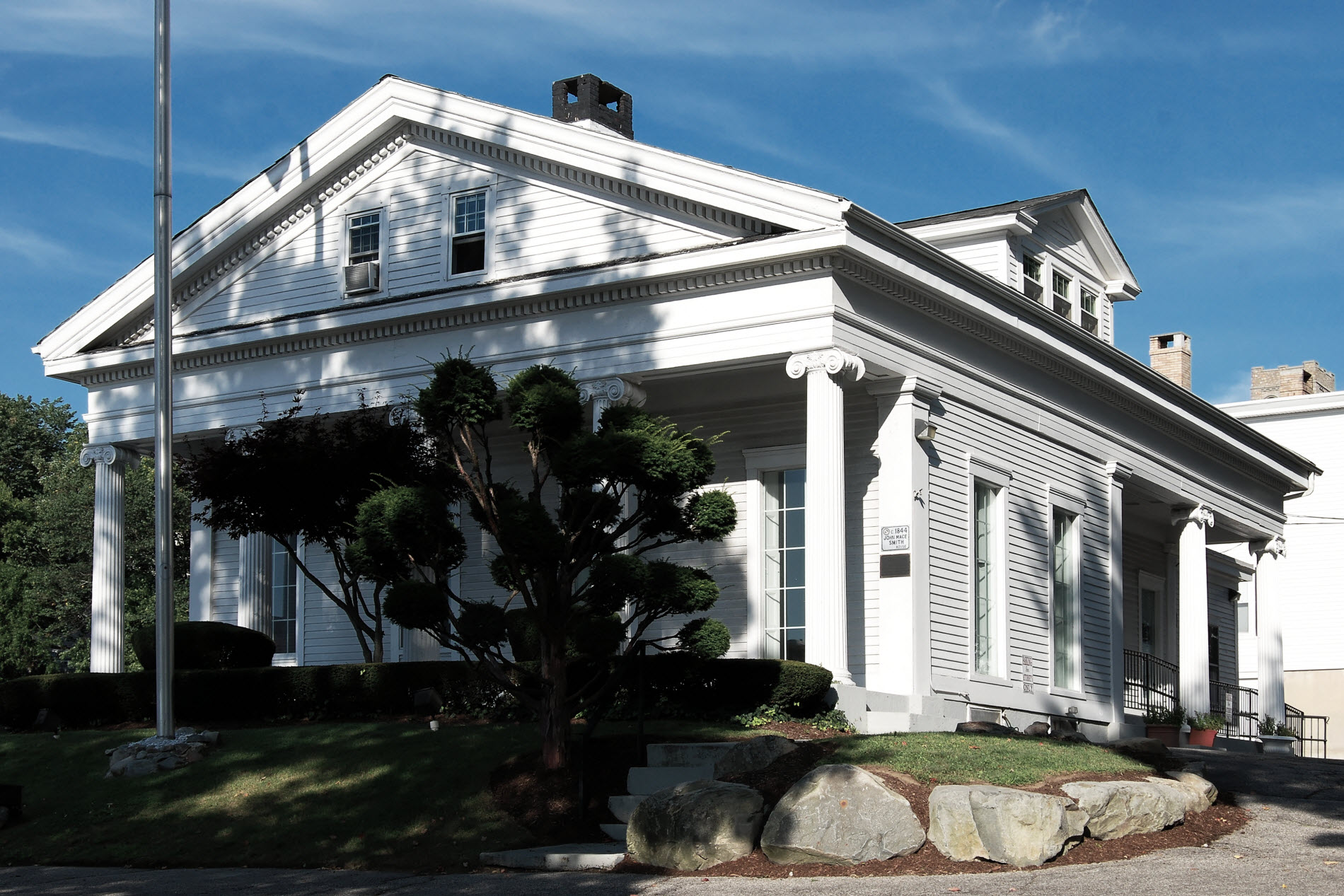

- Location within Massachusetts
- Location: Fall River, Massachusetts
- Coordinates: 41°42′26.2″N 71°9′15.2″W
- Built: 1844
- Architectural style: Greek Revival
- MPS: Fall River MRA
- NRHP reference No.: 83000717
- Added to NRHP: February 16, 1983

The John Mace Smith House is a historic house at 399 N. Main Street in Fall River, Massachusetts. The house was built in 1844 and added to the National Register of Historic Places in 1983.

It is a small Greek Revival "temple front" house. Deeds show that the land, part of the Rodman Farm was surveyed in 1837 and sold by Samuel Rodman to John M. Smith for $1200 on 11/6/1843. Not much is known about Smith - he was associated with the American Print Works in 1859. The house was passed on the Lydia P. Fellows, the daughter of Smith, and wife of the Rev. H. S. Fellows. In the 1890s John Coughlin, a physician lived here: he may be responsible for the building of the ell, as he kept his office and home here.

One of a cluster of outstanding Greek Revival houses on North Main Street, built by early mill-owners and prosperous merchants in the downtown area after the 1843 fire. This building, like the majority of the others has certain signature elements reminiscent of Russell Warren's work, most notably the cantilevered "flying staircase", floor plan and moulding details. The high quality of design and workmanship may be attributable to Russell Warren, a prominent Rhode Island architect and proponent of the Greek Revival. The high architectural quality, the relative scarcity of buildings of this age and type, and their association with figures important in the industrial and commercial development of Fall River.

== See also ==
- National Register of Historic Places listings in Fall River, Massachusetts
