= Russell Warren (architect) =

American architect

- Born: 1783; Tiverton, Rhode Island, US
- Died: 1860 (aged 76–77); Providence, Rhode Island, US
- Occupation: Architect
- Practice: Russell Warren; Warren, Tallman & Bucklin; Davis & Warren; R. Warren & Son
- Buildings: Linden Place; Westminster Arcade; Chatham County Courthouse; Manning Hall; New Bedford City Hall; Smithville Seminary; Longfield; Ocean House

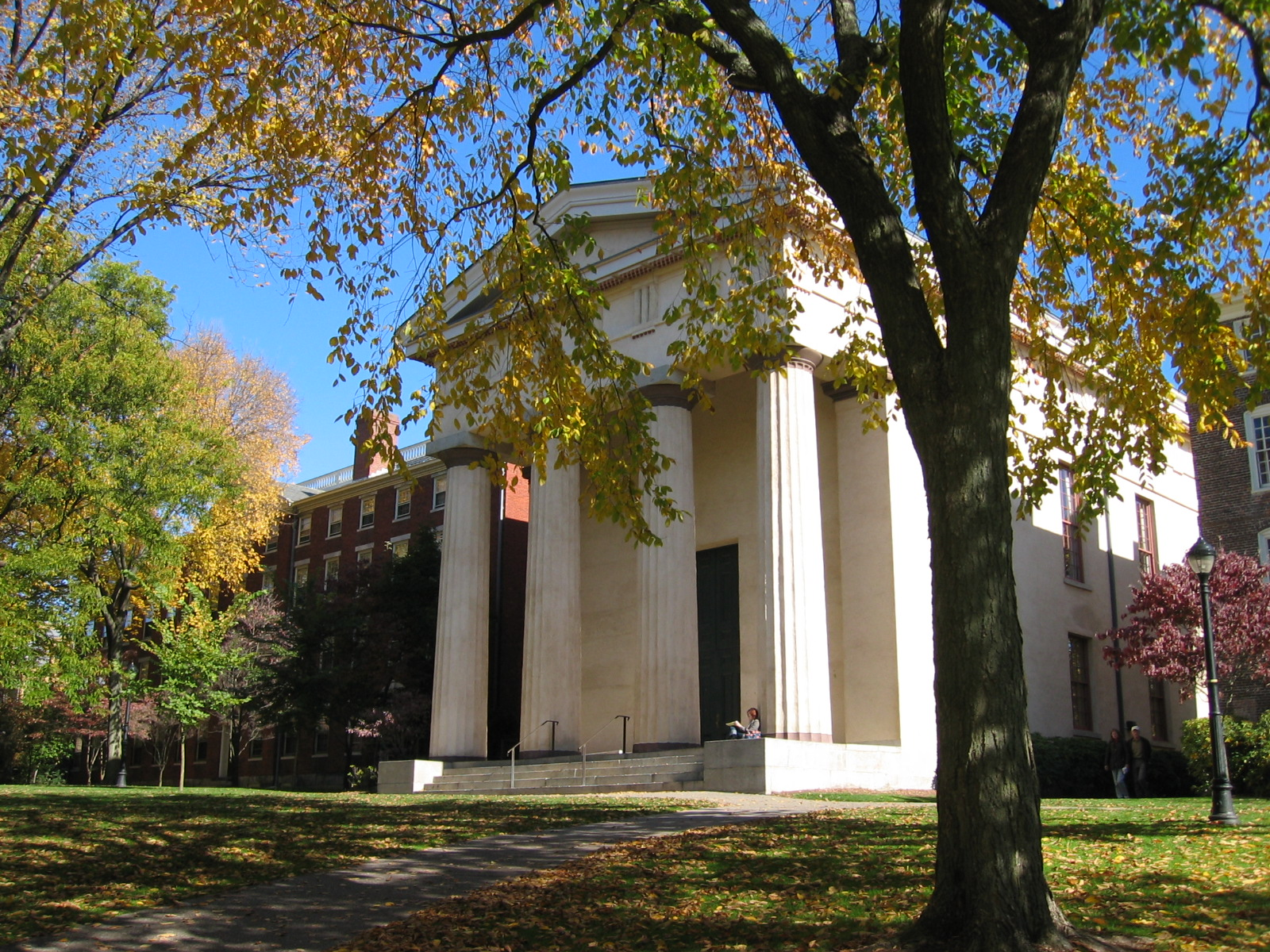
Manning Hall, Brown University, 1834.

Russell Warren (1783–1860) was an American architect, best known for his work in the Greek Revival style. He practiced in Bristol and Providence.

== Life and career ==
Warren was born in Tiverton, Rhode Island. He arrived in Bristol in 1800, and began to design and build unique Federal-style houses for the upper and middle class residents of that town. In 1823, Warren left Providence and went south to Georgetown, South Carolina, where he became a building contractor. In 1826 Warren moved back to Rhode Island, opening an architect's office in Providence. In 1828, he collaborated with fellow Providence architect James C. Bucklin of Tallman & Bucklin in the design of the Westminster Arcade, designing the Westminster Street facade. He joined Tallman & Bucklin formally in 1830, the firm becoming Warren, Tallman & Bucklin. This firm was dissolved the following year, although they occasionally collaborated in later years. Warren would become the foremost architect in southeastern New England, working as far away as Plymouth.

For a few months in 1835 and 1836, Warren worked with Alexander J. Davis in New York, who had recently left his partnership with Ithiel Town. The Congregational Church in New Bedford was conceived under Davis at this time, but was built by Warren after he had returned to Providence.

Although he had never been to Greece, Warren was a master of Greek architectural styles. In 1838, he designed a set of three Greek Revival houses within 50 feet of each other on Hope Street in Bristol. Each house represented one of the different Greek styles: an Ionic house for future governor Francis M. Dimond, a Corinthian house for Captain Josiah Talbot, and a Doric house for Captain John Fletcher. The latter is now demolished.

Warren continued in solo practice until 1846, when he took his son Osborn Warren as partner. The new firm was known as Russell Warren & Son, and lasted for two years, when Russell and Osborn are listed separately in the directory. From then until his death, Warren practiced independently. His commissions waned in the 1850s, owing to the emergence of other architects such as Thomas A. Tefft and Alpheus C. Morse.

Warren died in 1860. He is buried in Grace Church Cemetery, Providence, Rhode Island.

In 1842, at the dedication at New Bedford of Warren's new Parker House, the president of the corporation said of Warren and Providence, "Her architects have made it a “City of Palaces”; she has furnished us with hosts who will give to the world a stranger’s welcome."

== Architectural works ==
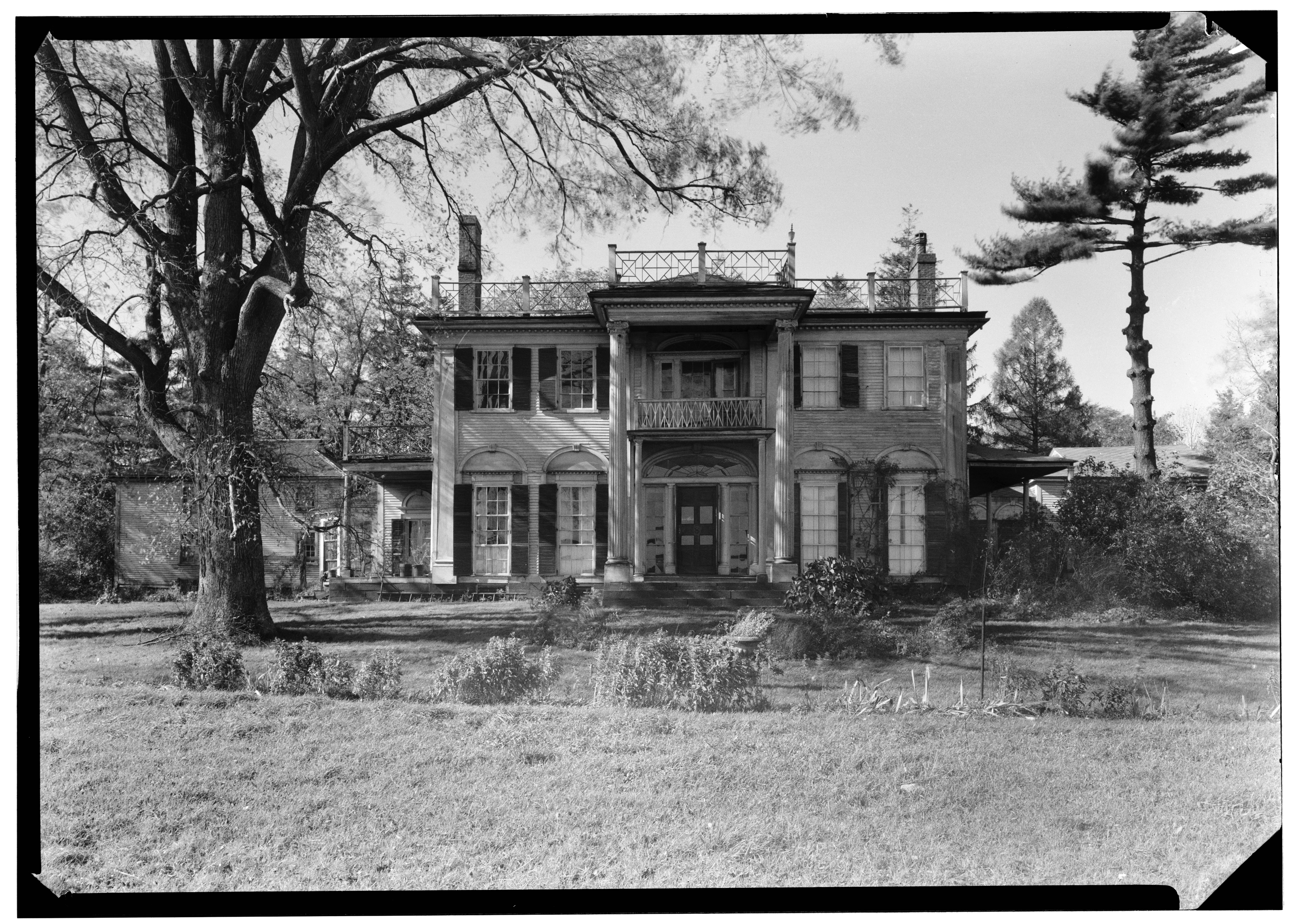
William DeWolf House (1808, demolished)

=== Russell Warren, 1800–1823 and 1826–1830 ===
- William van Doorn House, 86 State St., Bristol, RI (1807)
- Hey-Bonnie Hall (William DeWolf House), 127 Poppasquash Rd., Bristol, RI (1808) – Demolished 1944.
- Russell Warren House, 92 State St., Bristol, RI (1810)
- Thomas Nelson House, 82 State St., Bristol, RI (1810)
- Linden Place (George DeWolf House), 500 Hope St., Bristol, RI (1810)
- Benjamin Bosworth House, 515 Hope St., Bristol, RI (1815) – Demolished.
- Westminster Arcade, 130 Westminster St., Providence, RI (1827–28) – Designed in association with Tallman & Bucklin.
- Bristol County Courthouse, 441 County St., New Bedford, MA (1828–31)
- Westminster Congregational Church, 121 Mathewson St., Providence, RI (1828–29) – Later the Rialto Theatre. Mostly demolished.
- St. Mark's Episcopal Church, 21 Lyndon St., Warren, RI (1829) – Altered.
- Joseph Grinnell House, 379 County St., New Bedford, MA (1830)

=== Warren, Tallman & Bucklin, 1830–1831 ===
- Chatham County Courthouse, 133 Montgomery St., Savannah, GA (1830–33) – Demolished in 1889.
- City Hotel, 164 Weybosset St., Providence, RI (1831) – Demolished in 1903.

=== Russell Warren, 1831–1835 ===
- Mechanics' and Merchants' Banks Building, 56-62 N. Water St., New Bedford, MA (1831) – Built as the home of these two competing institutions.
- Grace Episcopal Church, 175 Mathewson St., Providence, RI (1832) – Demolished only a decade later for the Upjohn church.
- Pilgrim Hall (Portico), 75 Court St., Plymouth, MA (1833–34) – The building stands, but Warren's portico was replaced in 1922.
- Elmhyrst (William Vernon, Jr. House), 23 Freeborn St., Middletown, RI (1833)
- North Christian Church, Purchase & Middle Sts., New Bedford, MA (1833) – Demolished 1923.
- St. Michael's Episcopal Church, 399 Hope St., Bristol, RI (1833) – Burned 1858.
- St. Paul's Episcopal Church, 2679 E. Main Rd., Portsmouth, RI (1833) – Altered.
- William R. Rodman House, 188 County St., New Bedford, MA (1833–36)
- John Avery Parker House, County & Pearl Sts., New Bedford, MA (1834) – Demolished c.1902.
- Levi H. Gale House, 89 Touro St., Newport, RI (1834)
- Manning Hall, Brown University, Providence, RI (1834)
- North Baptist Church, N. Baptist & Farewell Sts., Newport, RI (1834) – Demolished 1906.
- Linden Place (Remodeling), 500 Hope St., Bristol, RI (1834)
- Warren Ladies' Seminary, 340 Main St., Warren, RI (1834) – Burned in 1863.
- Zion Episcopal Church, 49 Touro St., Newport, RI (1834) – Later St. Joseph's, now the Jane Pickens Theatre. Altered.
- Grace Episcopal Church, Union St., New Bedford, MA (1835) – Demolished.

=== Davis & Warren, 1835–1836 ===
- Dutch Reformed Church, 132 Grand St., Newburgh, NY (1835)
- White Hall, Bristol College, Croydon, PA (1835) – Largely demolished.
- First Congregational (Unitarian) Church, 71 8th St., New Bedford, MA (1836)

=== Russell Warren, 1836–1845 ===
- John Fletcher House, 601 Hope St., Bristol, RI (c.1836) – Demolished.
- Edwin L. Kerrison House, 138 Wentworth St., Charleston, SC (1838)
- Francis M. Dimond House, 617 Hope St., Bristol, RI (1838)
- Josiah Talbot House, 647 Hope St., Bristol, RI (1838)
- New Bedford City Hall, 613 Pleasant St., New Bedford, MA (1839) – Now the Free Public Library.
- Rhode Island State Arsenal, 176 Benefit St., Providence, RI (1839)
- Smithville Seminary, 29 Institute Ln., North Scituate, RI (1839)
- Atlantic House, 141 Pelham St., Newport, RI (1840) – Demolished in 1876.
- Jonathan R. Bullock House, 15 John St., Bristol, RI (1840) – Moved from Hope Street in 1900, for construction of Belvedere Hotel. Altered.
- Mark Anthony DeWolf House, Poppasquash Neck, Bristol, RI (1840) – Burned 1919.
- Nathan Durfee House, Prospect St. at Rock, Fall River, MA (c.1840) – Demolished.
- Pearl Street Depot, Pearl St. between Purchase & Acushnet, New Bedford, MA (1840) – A rare Egyptian Revival design. Demolished 1886.
- William Foster House, 19 Charlesfield St., Providence, RI (1840) – Demolished.
- Parker House, 888-908 Purchase St., New Bedford, MA (1841–42) – Demolished.
- St. Patrick R. C. Church, Davis & State Sts., Providence, RI (1841) – Demolished in 1906.
- Joseph Durfee House, 456 Rock St., Fall River, MA (1843)
- Warren Baptist Church, 407 Main St., Warren, RI (1844)
- William Lindsey House, 373 N. Main St., Fall River, MA (1844)
- Athenaeum Row, 257-259-261-263-265 Benefit St., Providence, RI (c.1845)

=== Russell Warren & Son, 1846–1848 ===
- Ocean House, 250-284 Bellevue Ave., Newport, RI (1846) – Burned in 1898.
- Longfield (Charles D. Gibson House), 1200 Hope St., Bristol, RI (1848)
- Providence City Hall, 122 Weybosset St., Providence, RI (1848) – Not built.

=== Russell Warren, 1849–1860 ===
Building	Location	Year	Notes	References
Jonathan R. Bullock House	Bristol, RI	1849	89 State St. Now a bed & breakfast, the Wissing House.	
Charles Smith House	Warren, RI	c. 1850	624 Main St.	
Richmond Street Congregational Church	Providence, RI	1852	34 Richmond St. Demolished.	
Stewart Street Baptist Church	Providence, RI	1852	Stewart St. Demolished.	
Henry Lippitt Duplex	Providence, RI	1855	198–200 Hope St.	
Richard James Arnold House	Newport, RI	1858	80 Rhode Island Ave. Demolished.	

=== Attributed to Warren ===
Building	Location	Year	Notes	References
John Howe House	Bristol, RI	1807	341 Hope St. Often called "The Four Eagles"	
David Augustus Leonard House	Bristol, RI	1806-7	366 Hope St. Known today as Leonard Place	
George Devol House	Bristol, RI	1811	132 High St.	
Stephen S. Fales House	Bristol, RI	1811	139 High St.	
Bristol County Courthouse	Bristol, RI	1816	260 High St. Also attributed to John Holden Greene.	
Washington Bank Building	Westerly, RI	1836	Dixon House Sq. Demolished.	
Alfred Bosworth House	Warren, RI	c. 1840	21 Federal St.	
Benjamin Barker House	Tiverton, RI	c. 1840	1229 Main Rd. Demolished 1981.	
James D. Hathaway House	Fall River, MA	1843	311 Pine St.	
William B. Spencer House	Phenix, RI	1847	2 Ames St.	

== Gallery ==
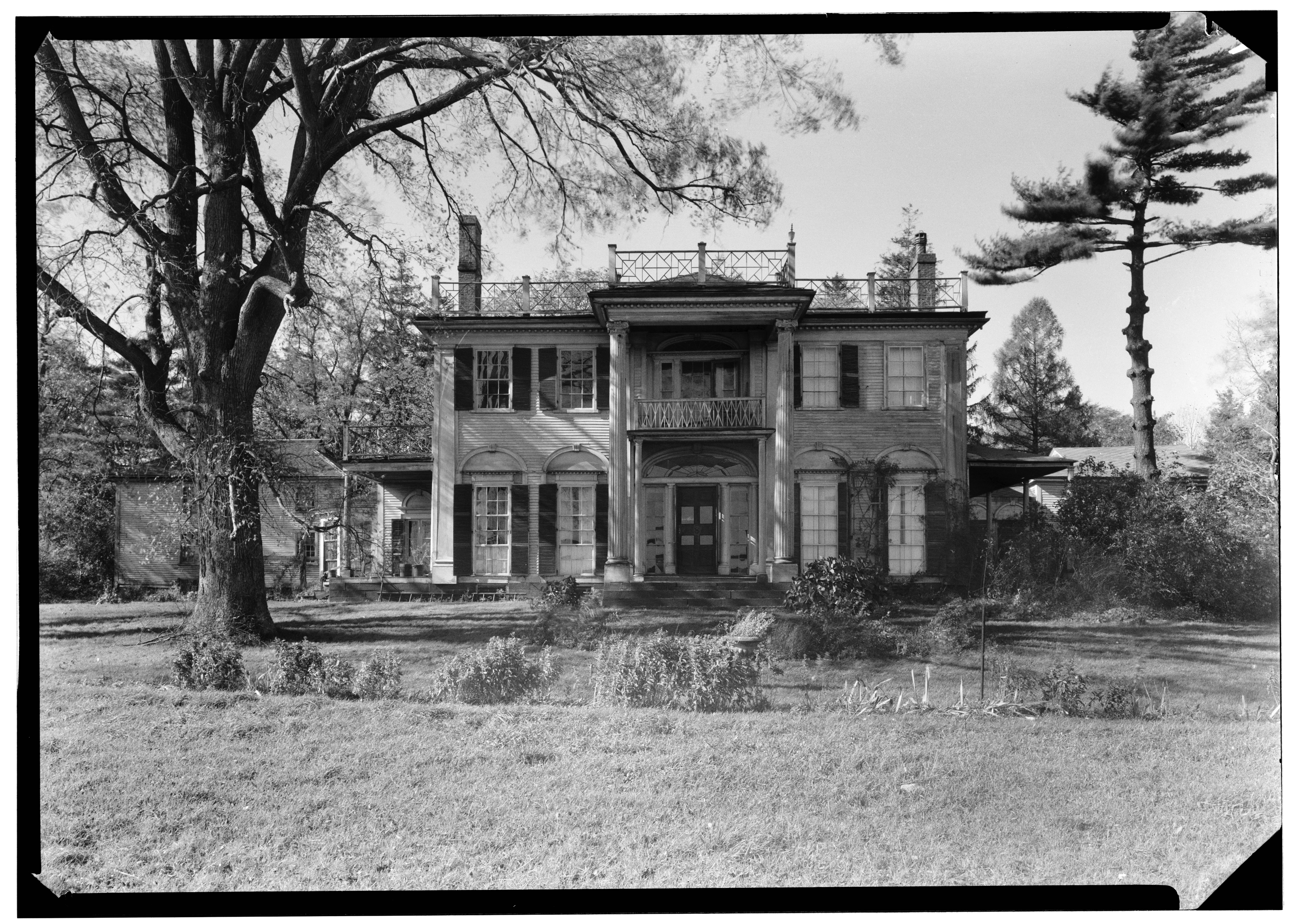
Hey-Bonnie Hall, Bristol, 1808.

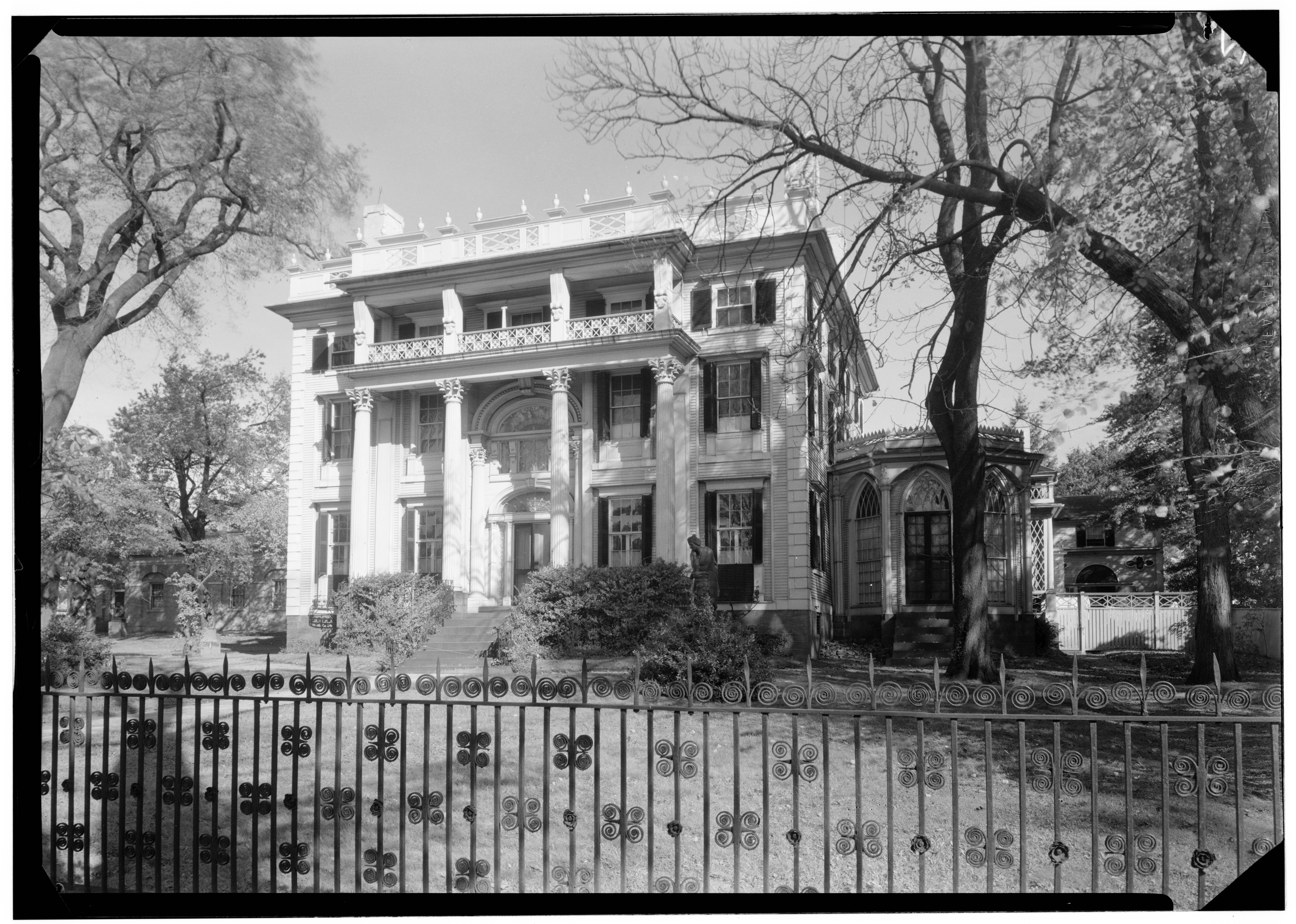
Linden Place, Bristol, 1810.

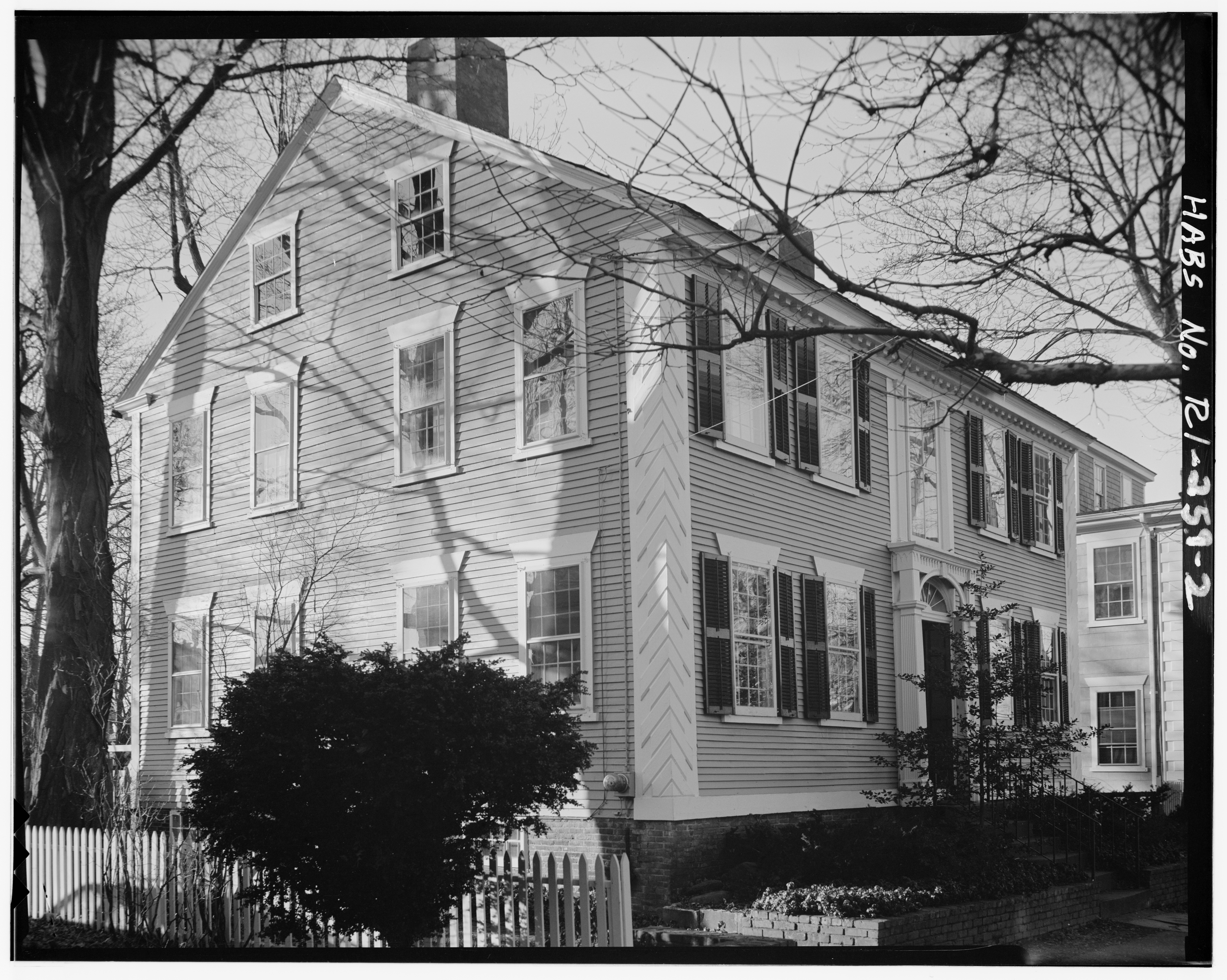
Russell Warren House, Bristol, 1810.

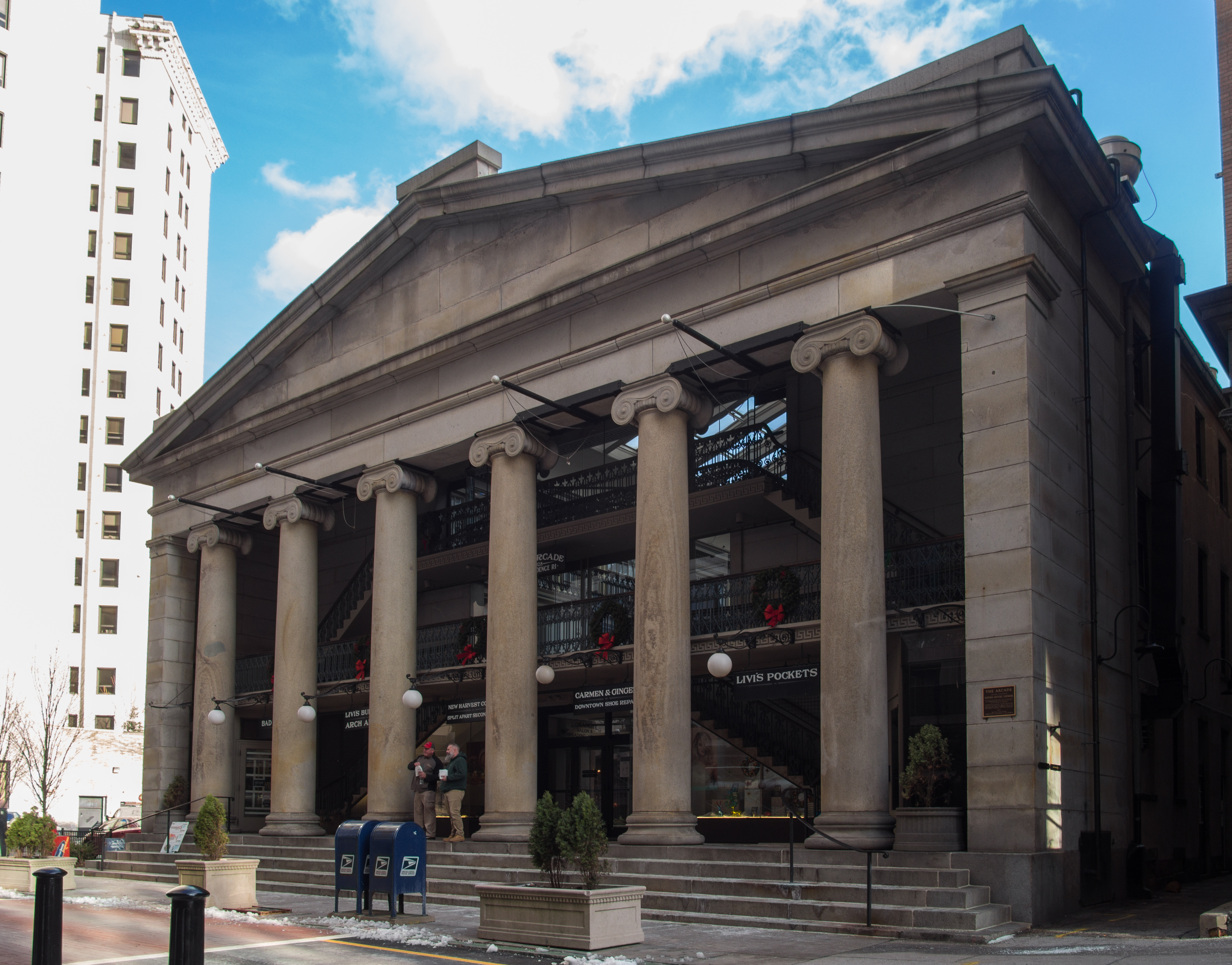
Westminster Arcade, Providence. 1828.

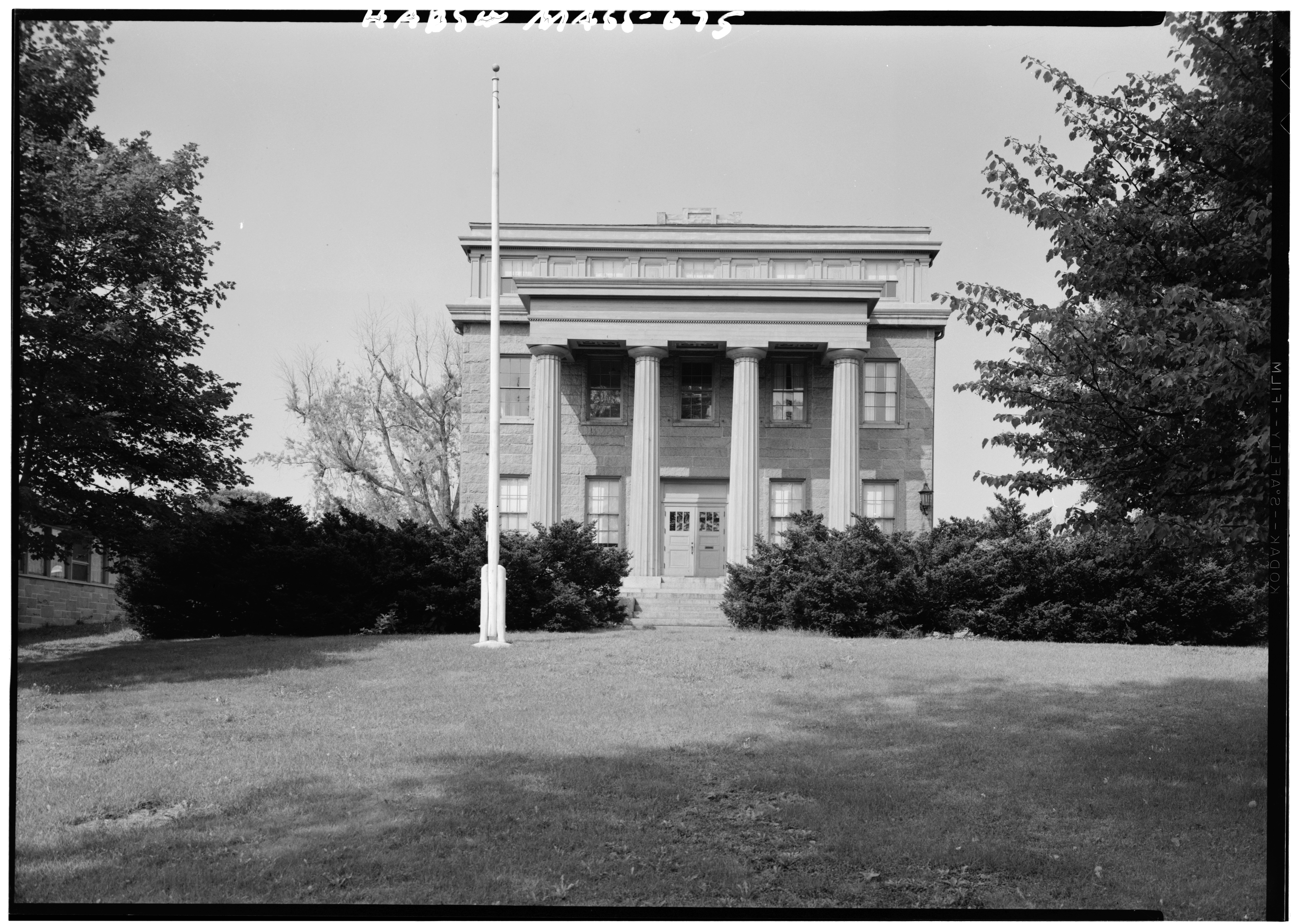
Joseph Grinnell House, New Bedford, 1830.

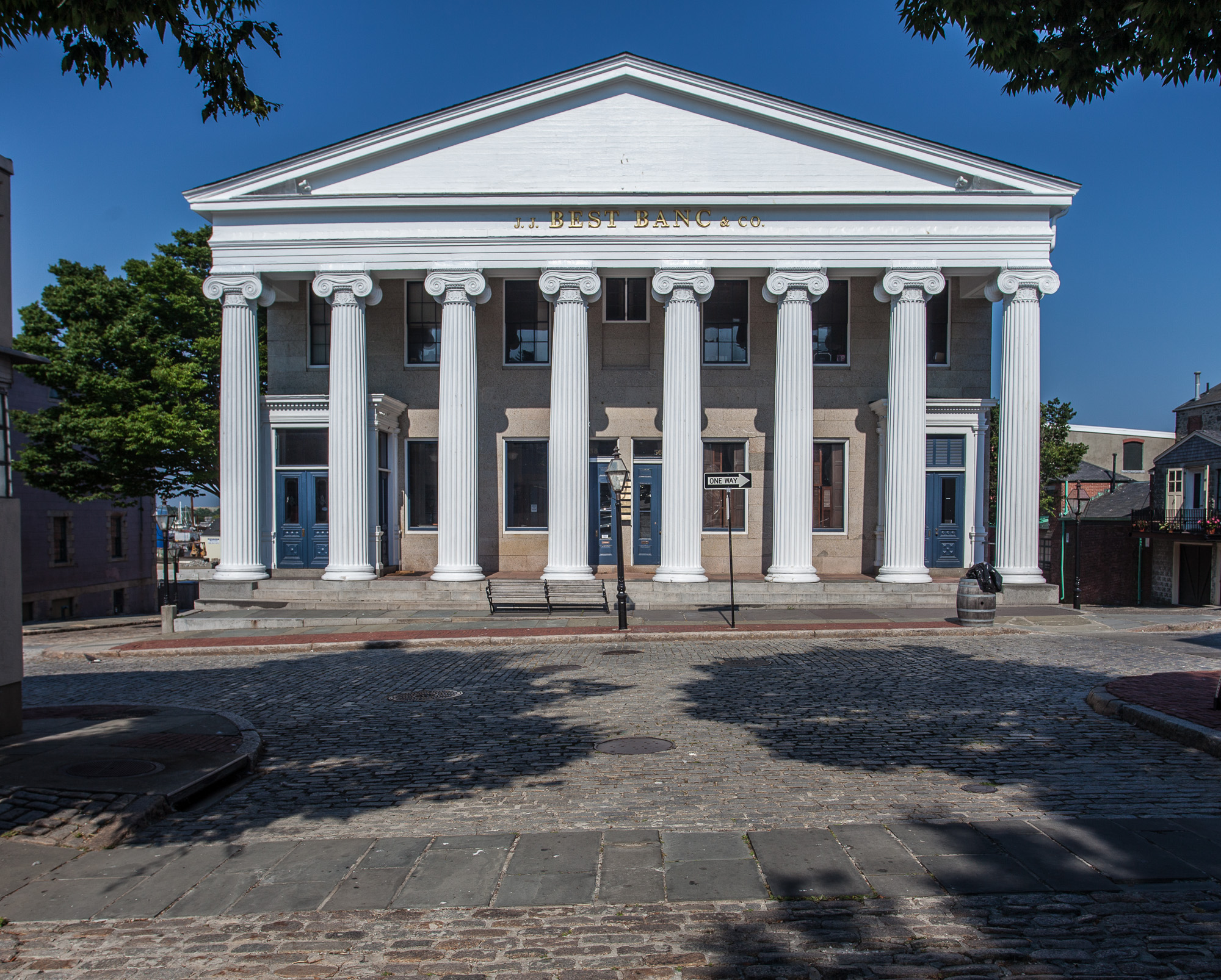
Mechanics' and Merchants' Banks Building, New Bedford, 1831.

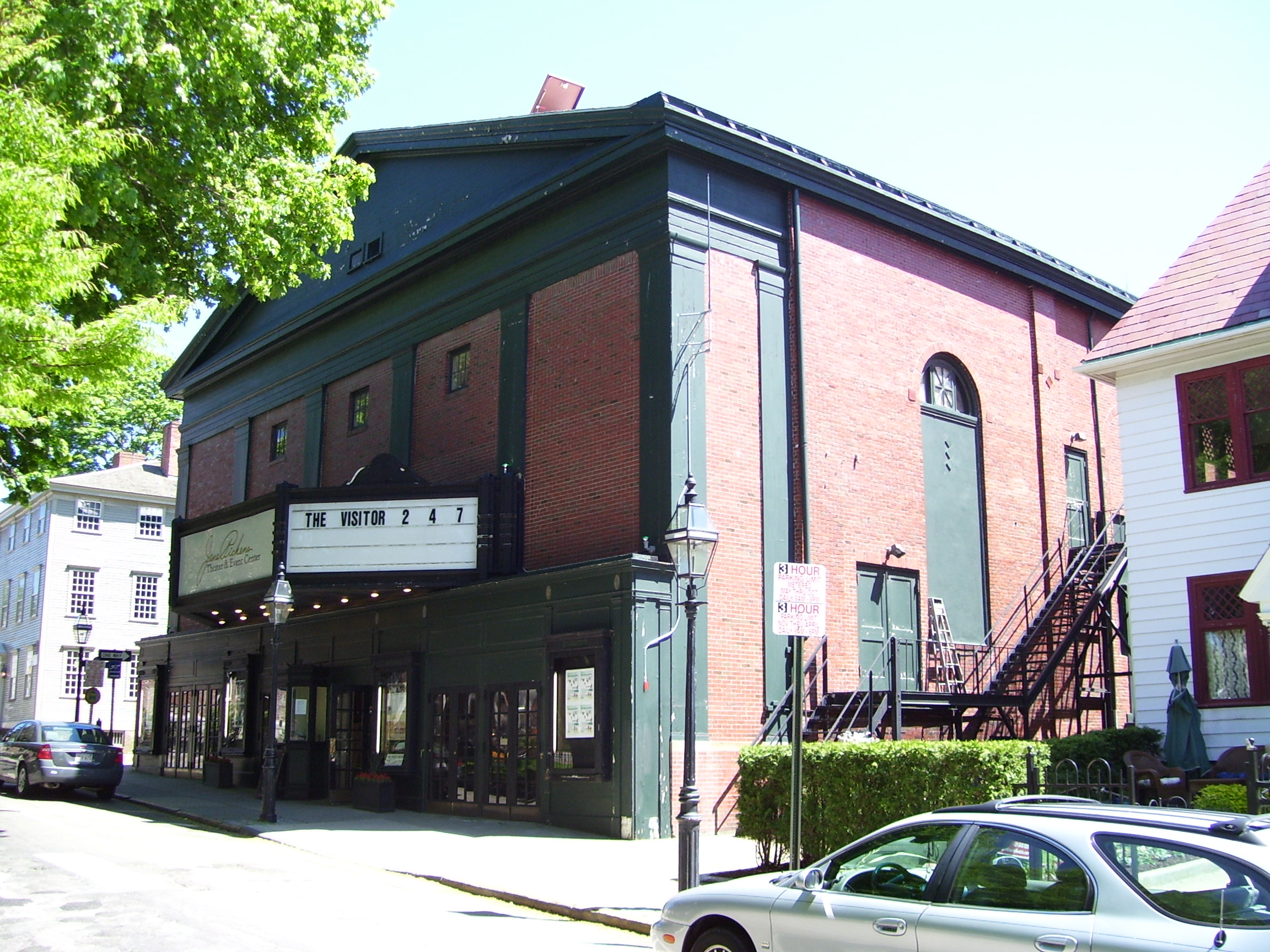
Zion Episcopal Church, Newport, 1834.

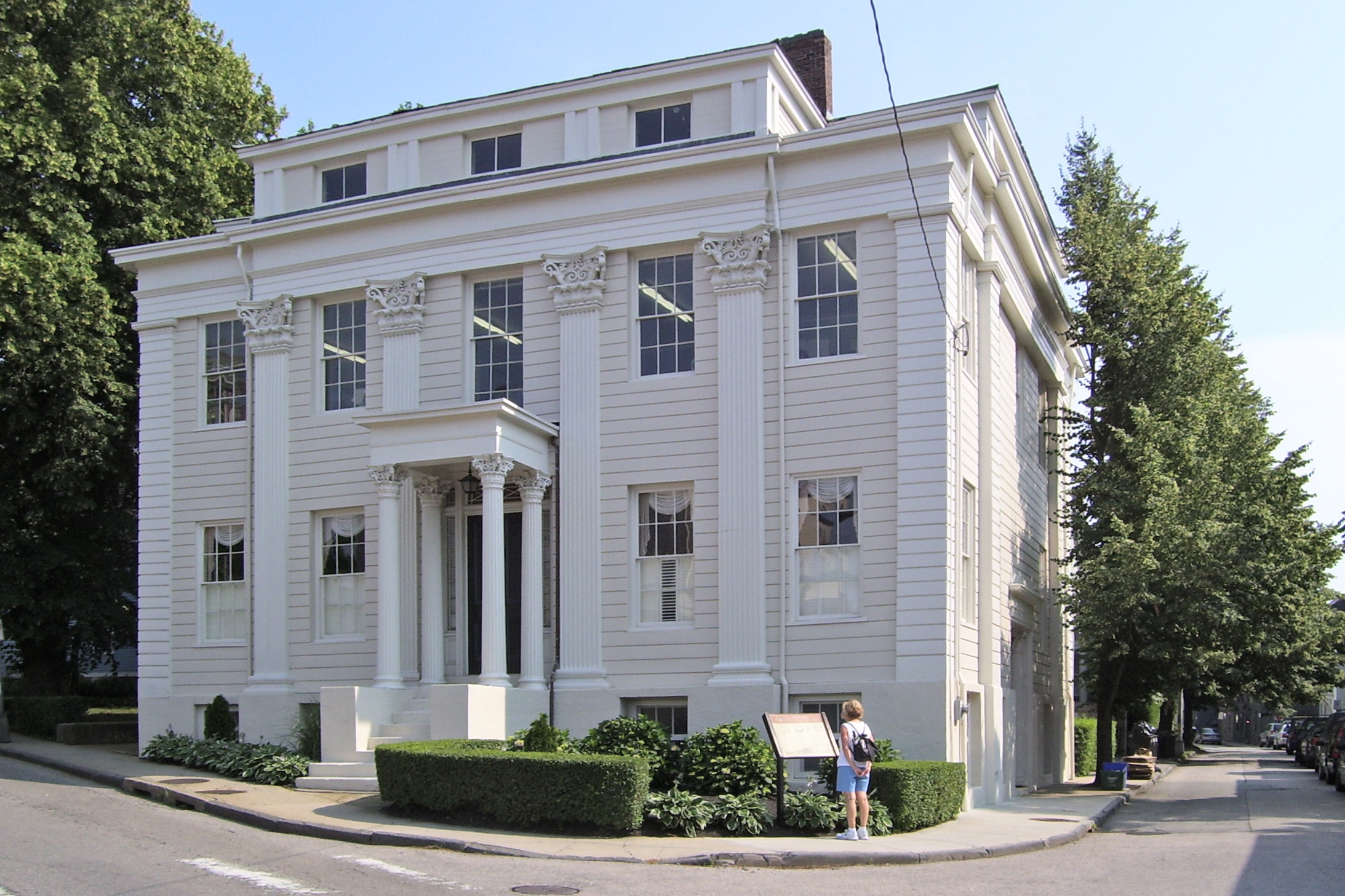
Levi H. Gale House, Newport, 1835.

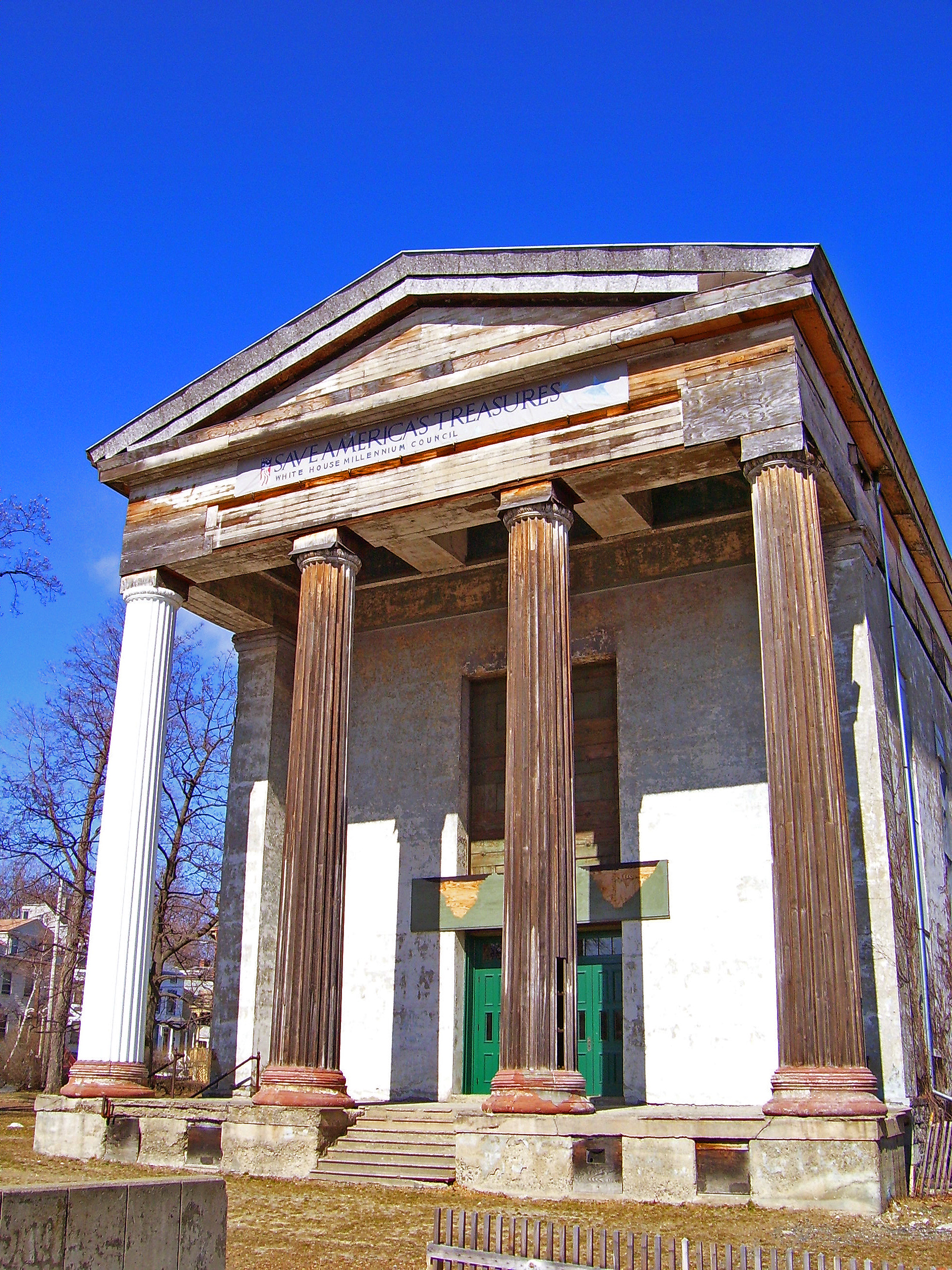
Dutch Reformed Church, Newburgh, 1835.

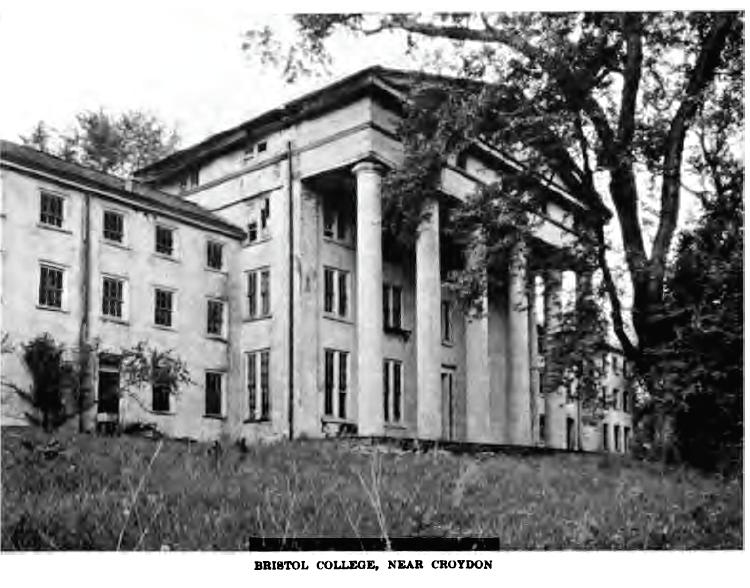
White Hall, Bristol College, 1835.

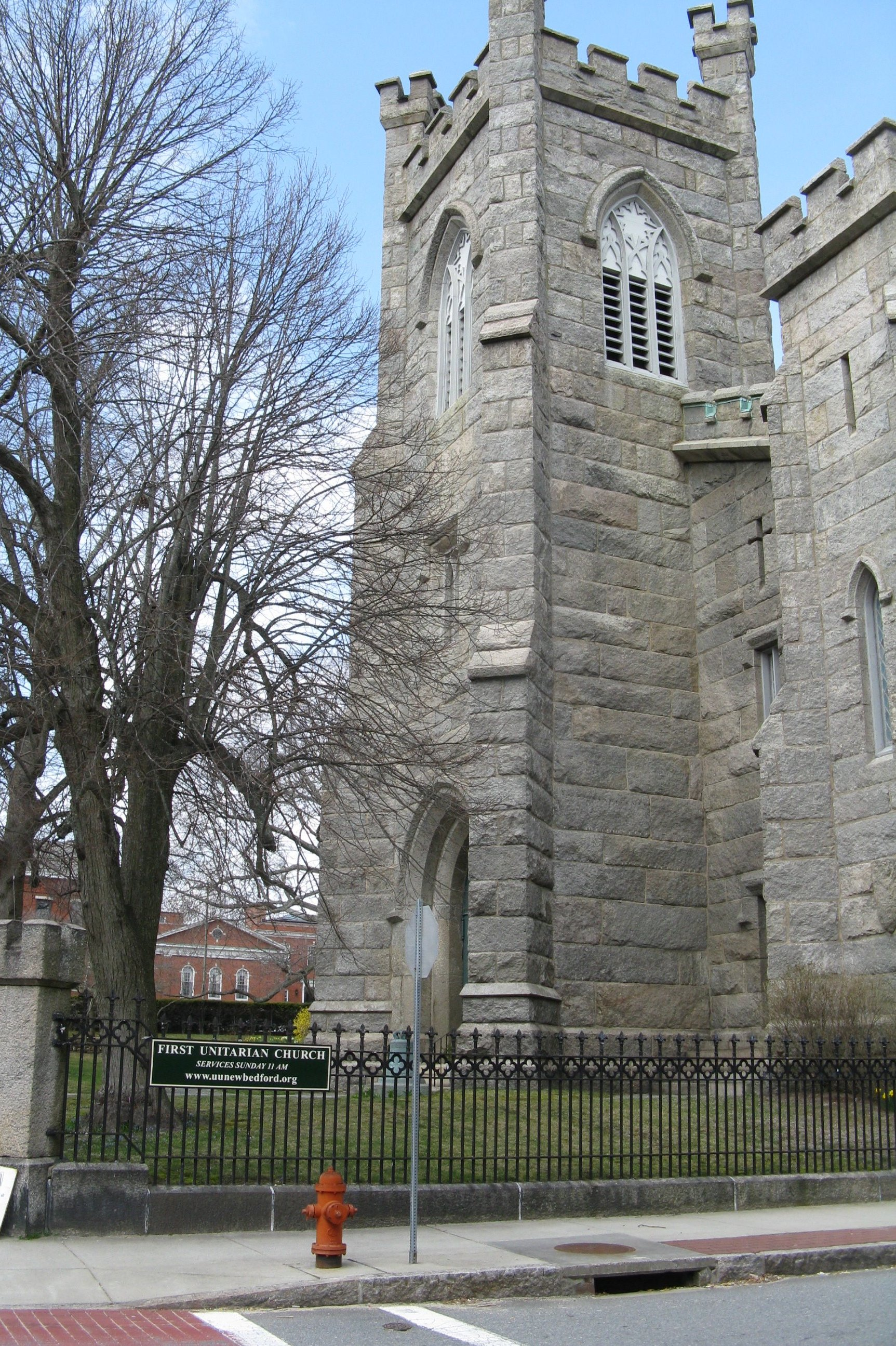
First Congregational Church, New Bedford, 1836.

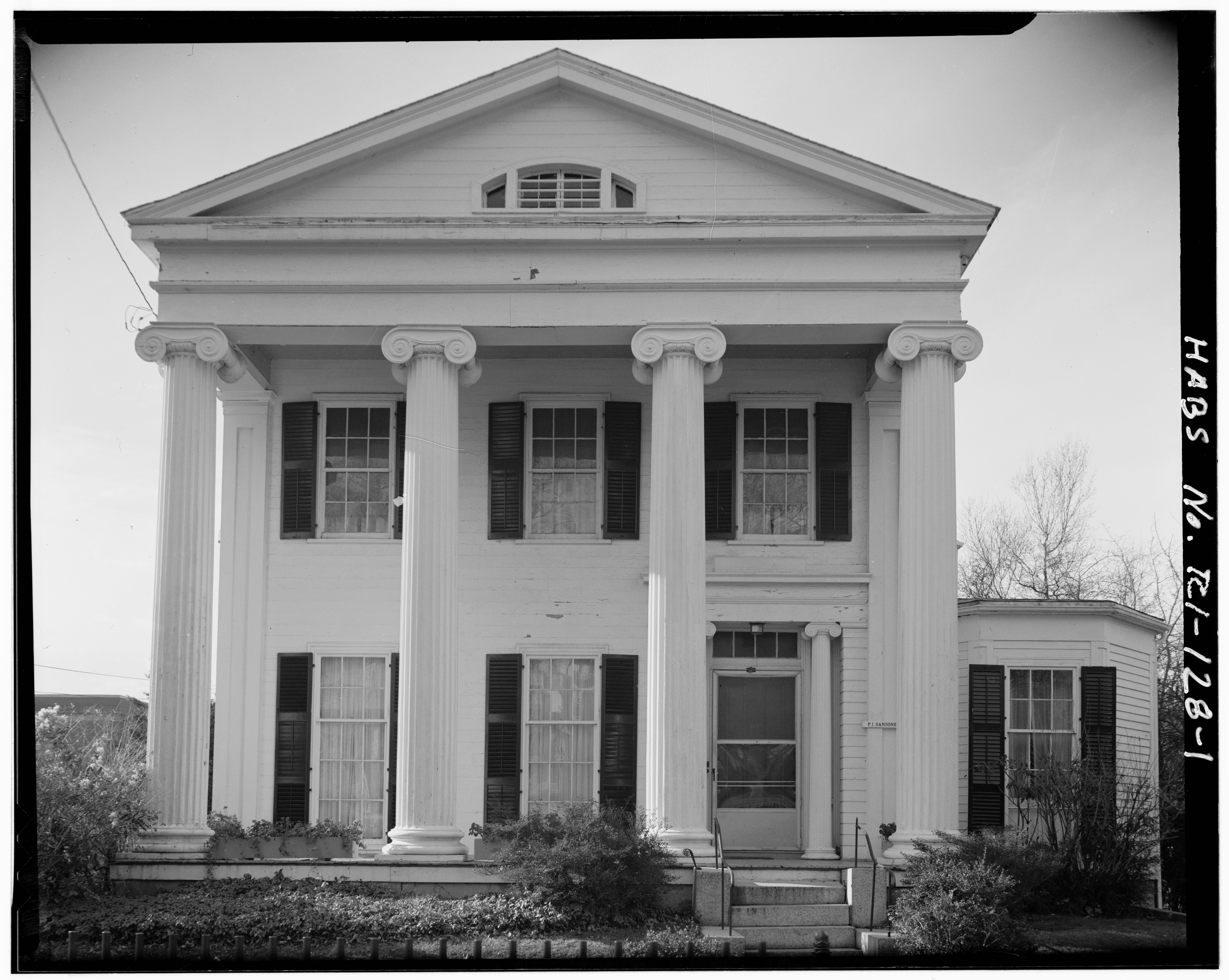
Francis M. Dimond House, Bristol. 1838.

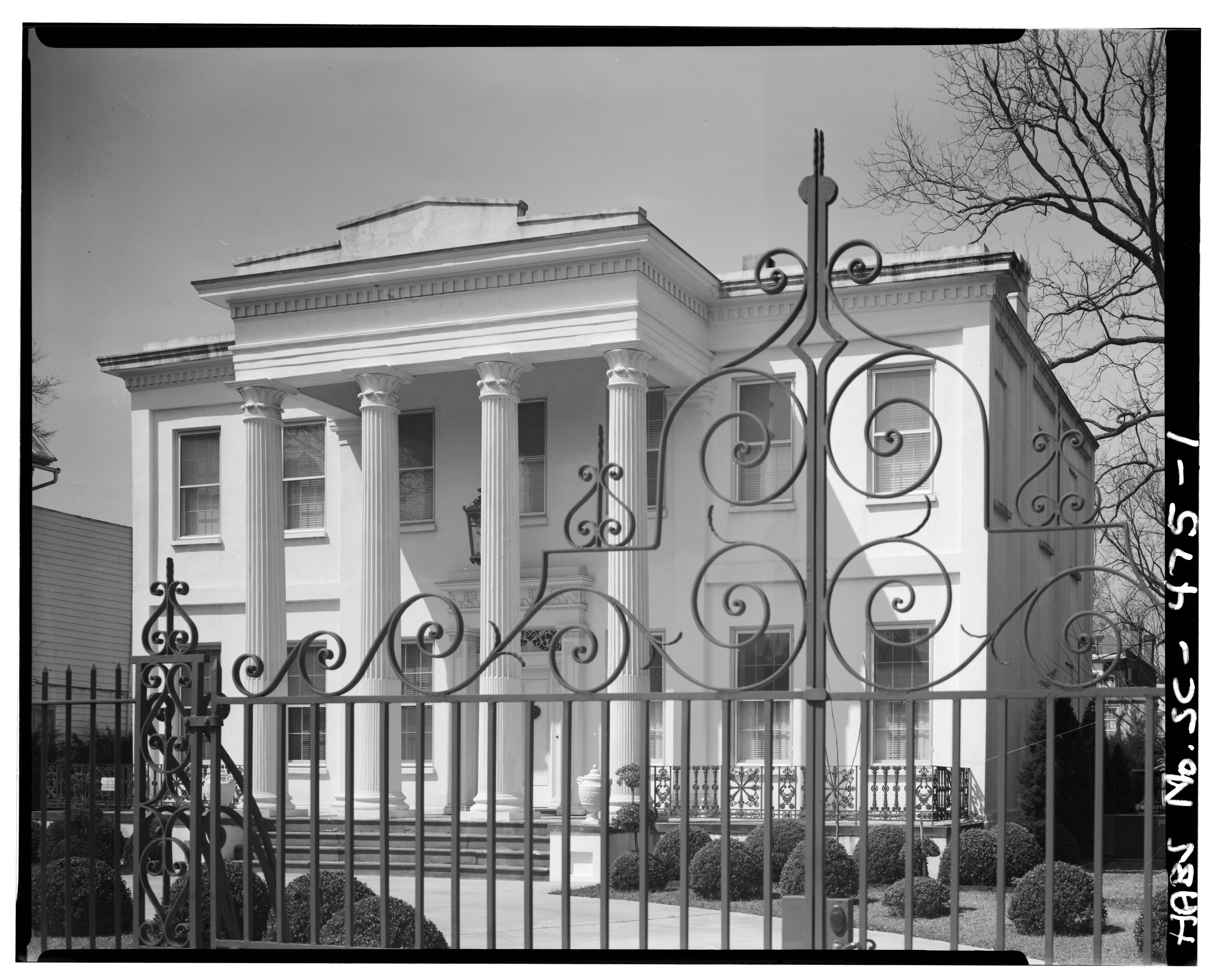
Edwin L. Kerrison House, Charleston, 1838.

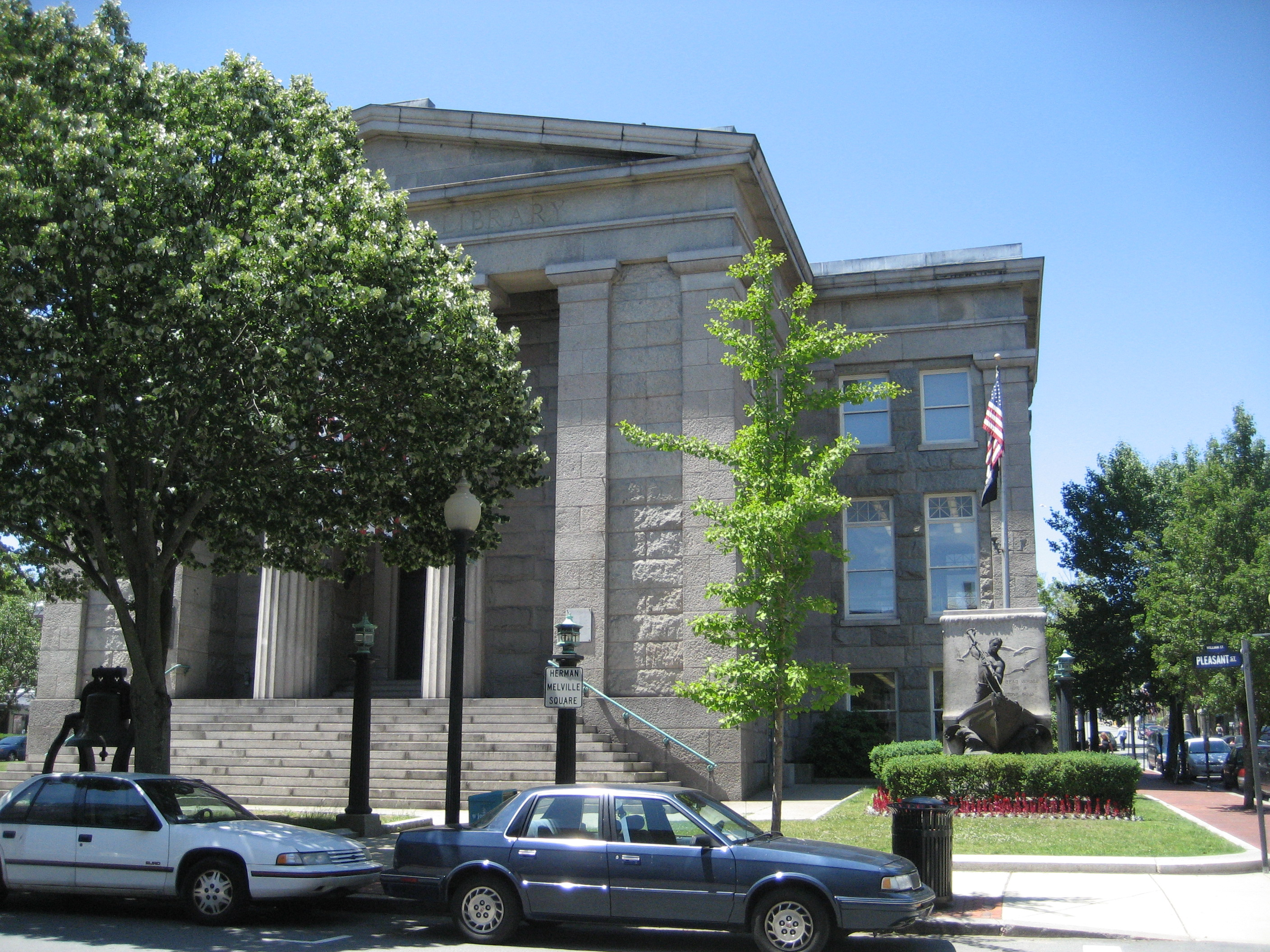
New Bedford City Hall, New Bedford, 1839.

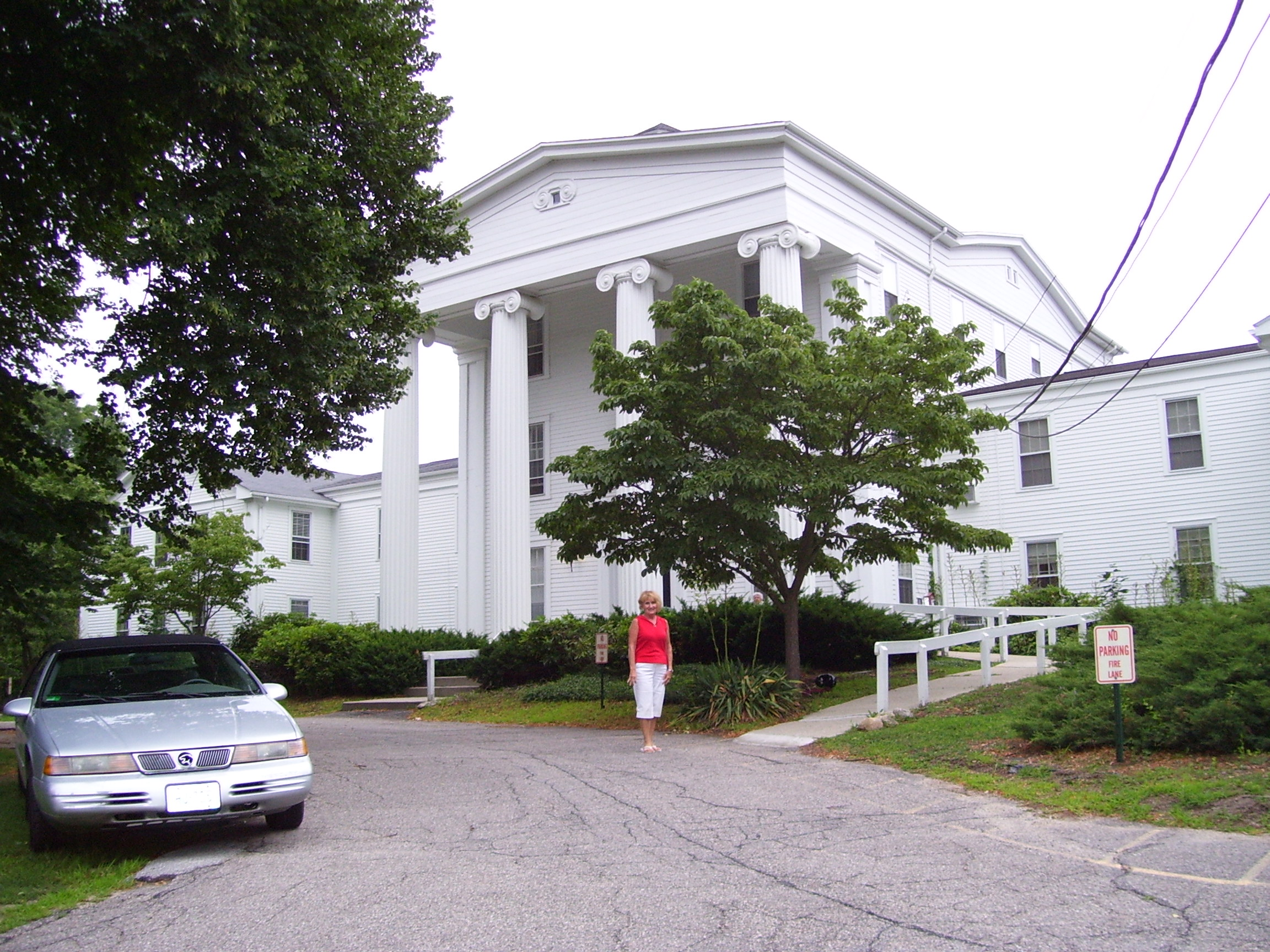
Smithville Seminary, North Scituate, 1839.

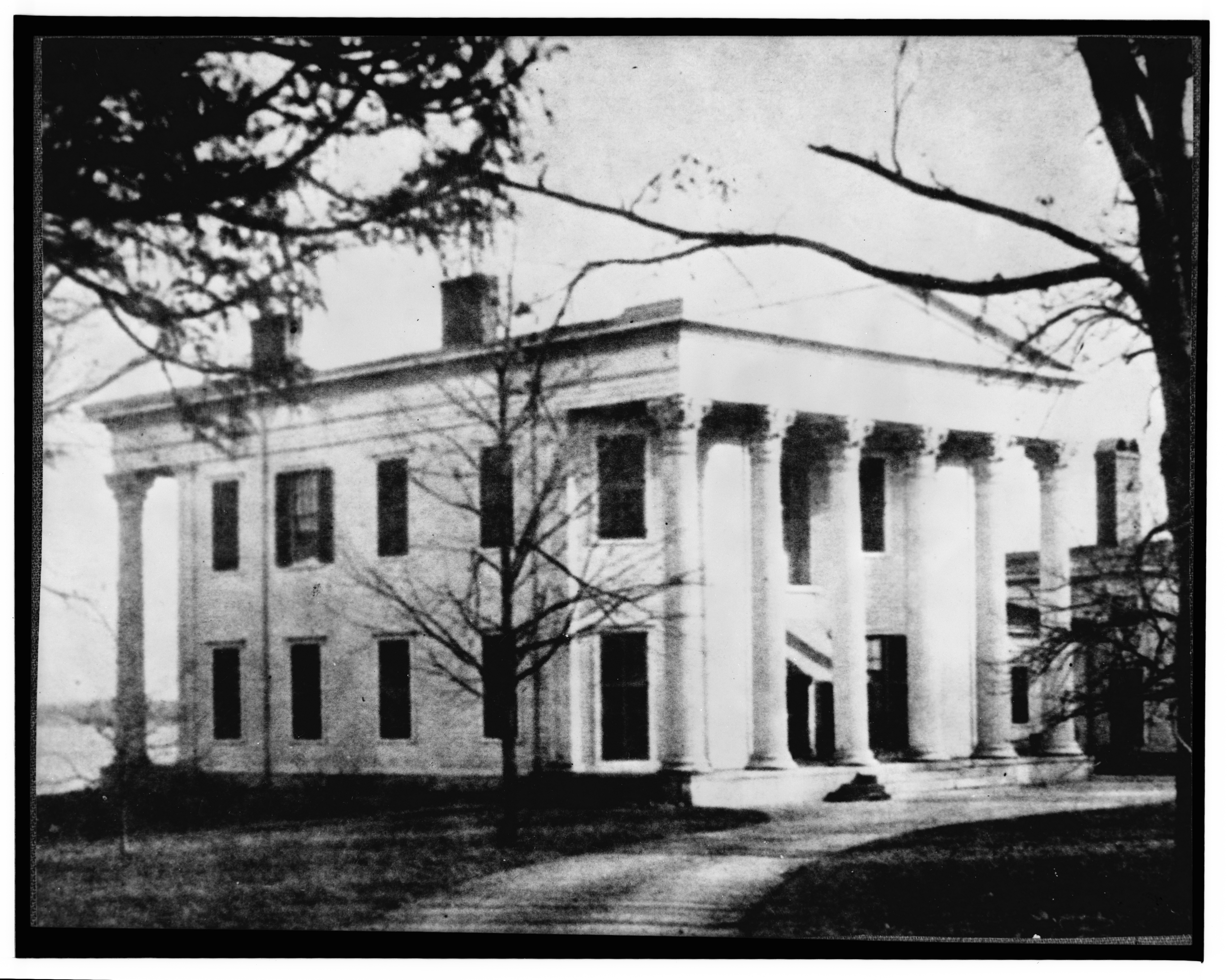
Mark Anthony DeWolf House, Bristol, 1840.

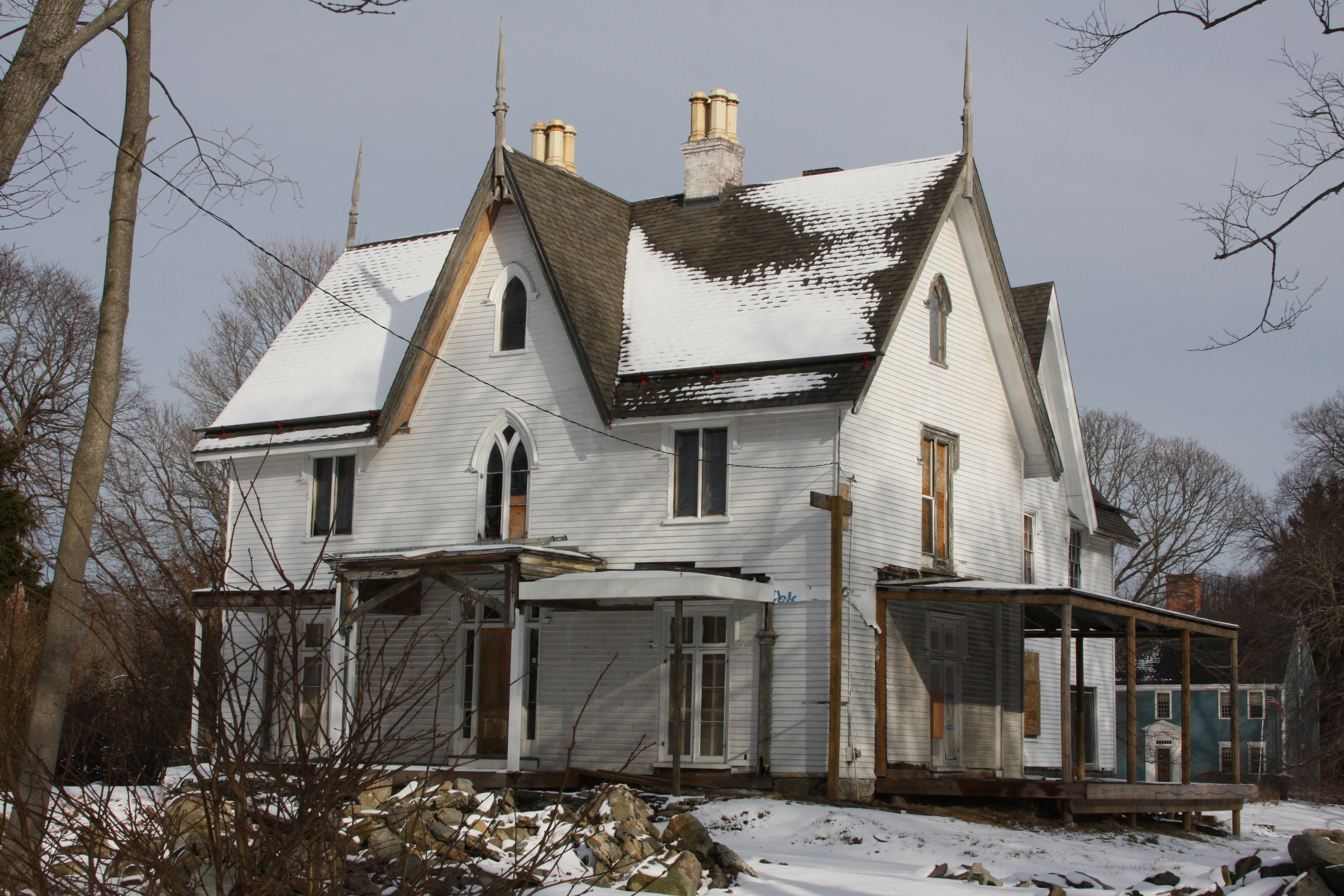
Longfield, Bristol, 1848.

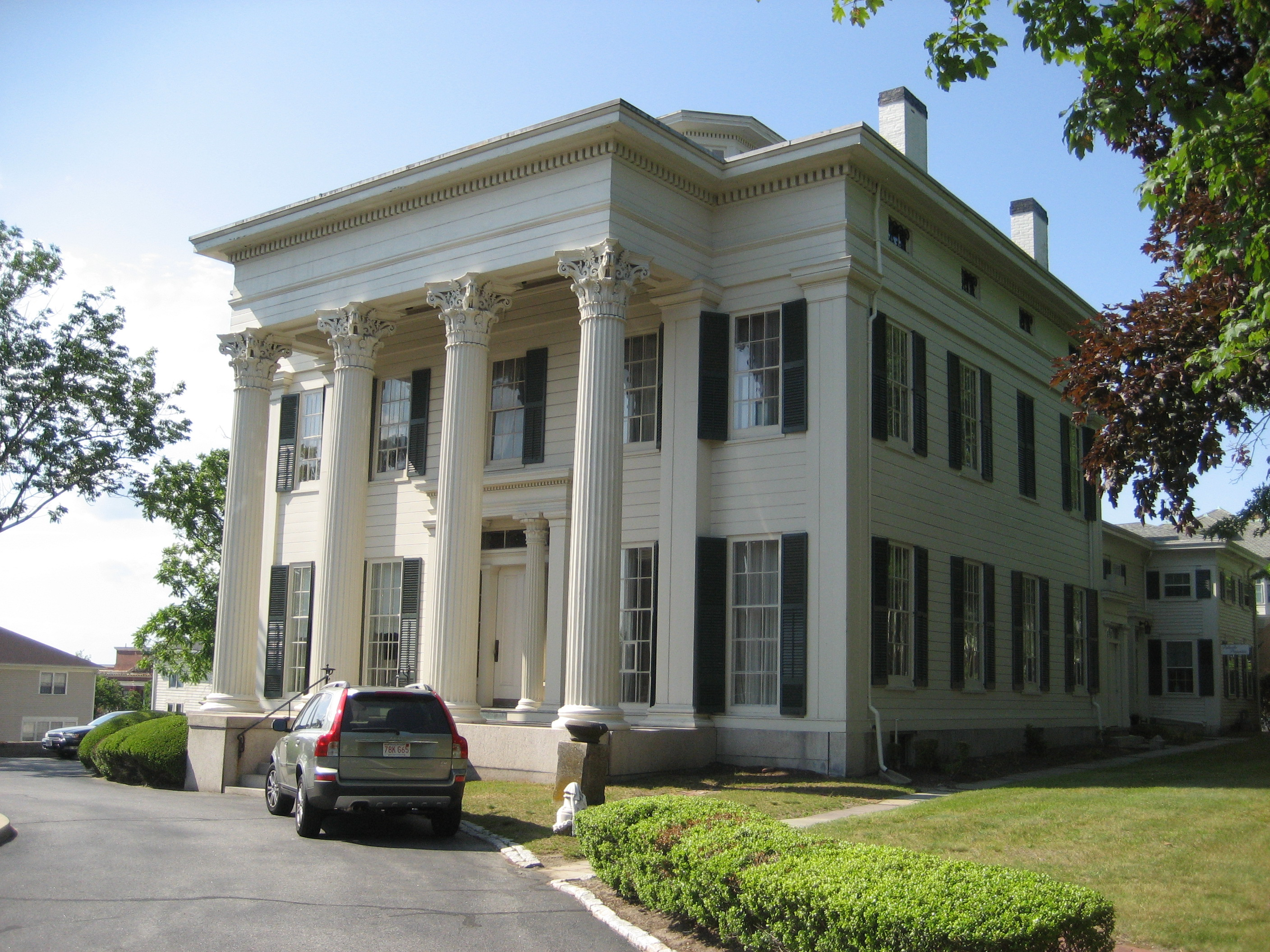
Joseph Durfee House, Fall River, 1843.

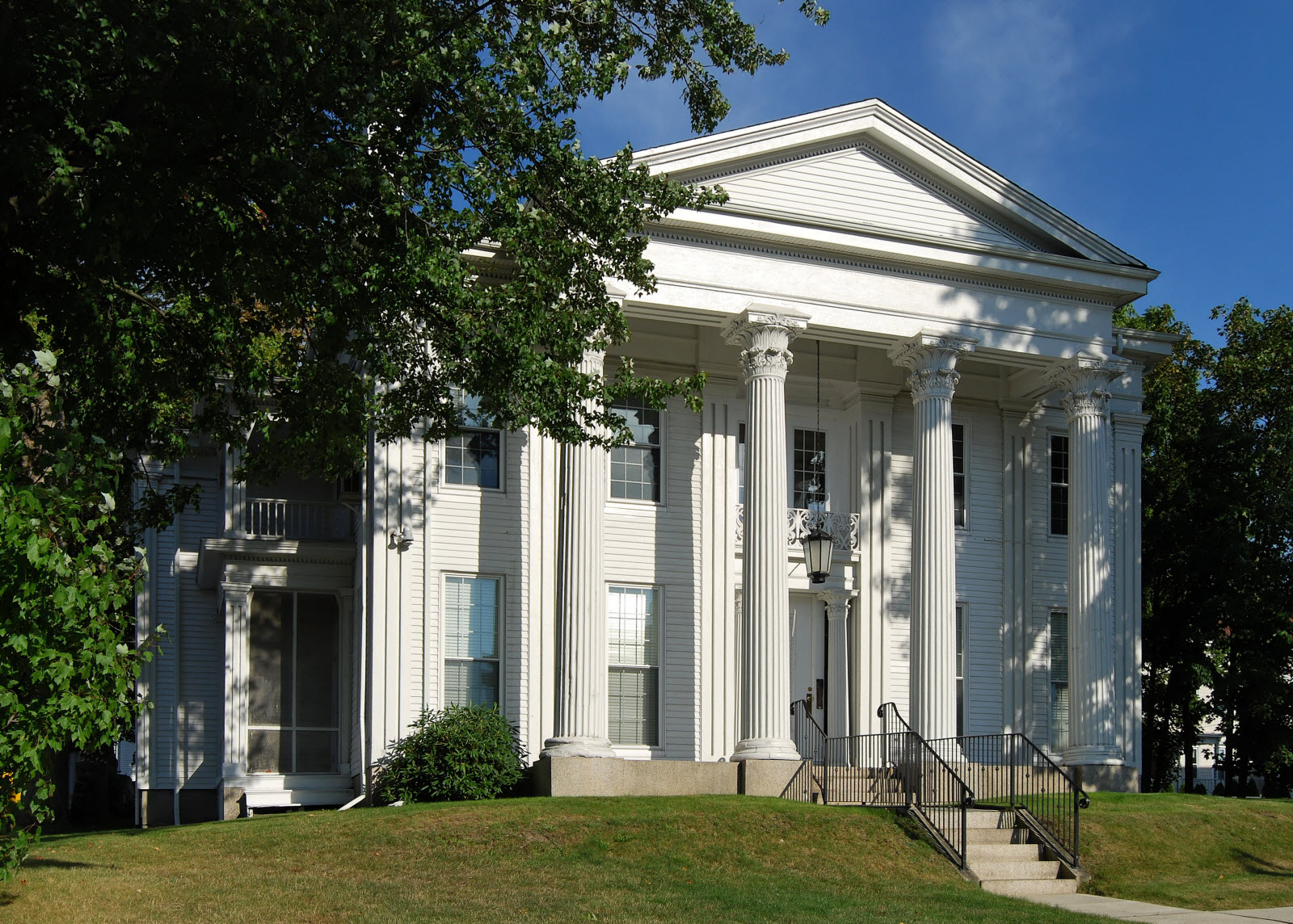
William Lindsey House, Fall River, 1844.

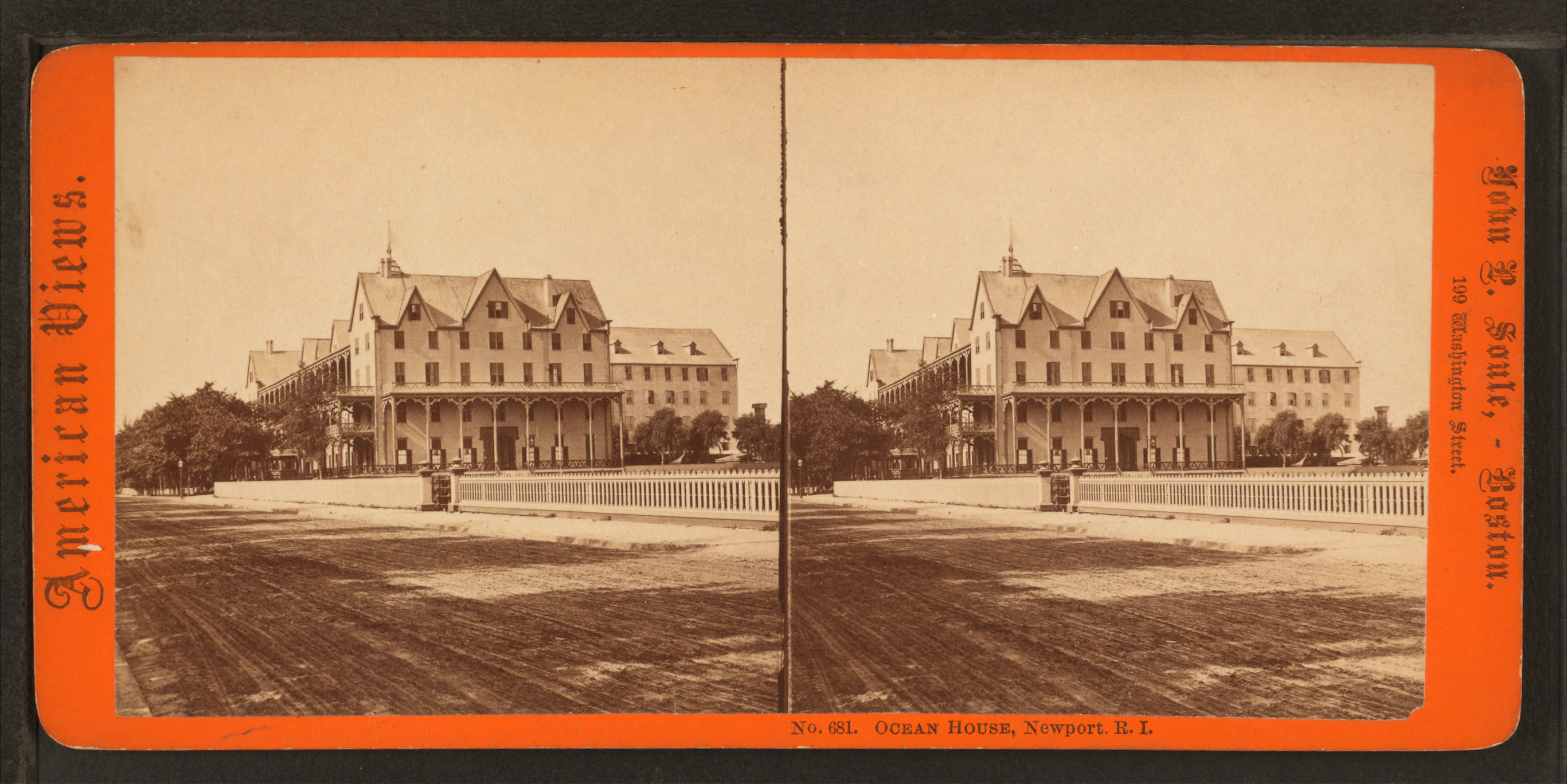
Ocean House, Newport, 1846.
