= Bristol County Courthouse =

Bristol County Courthouse may refer to:

- Bristol County Courthouse (Rhode Island)
- Bristol County Courthouse Complex, Taunton, Massachusetts
