= Candace Allen =

Candace Allen may refer to:

- Candace Allen (beauty queen), Miss District of Columbia USA
- Candace Allen (author) (born 1950), American novelist
- Candace Allen House, historic house in Providence, Rhode Island, United States
