= Aldrich Mansion =

Coordinates: 41°40′53.41″N 71°22′36.17″W

- Indian Oaks
- U.S. National Register of Historic Places
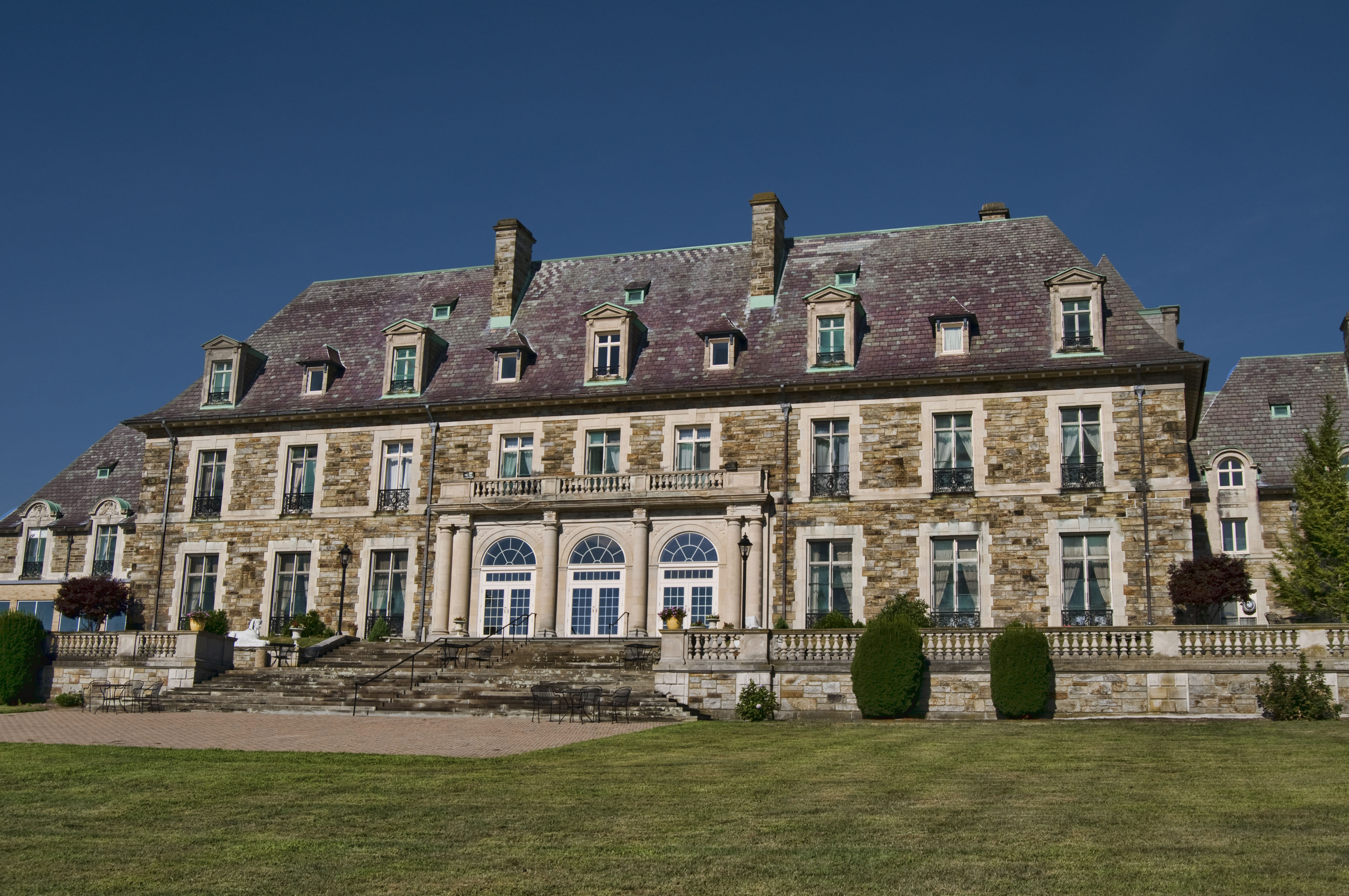
- Main house

- Location within Rhode Island Location within the United States
- Location: 836 Warwick Neck Ave., Warwick, Rhode Island
- Area: 74.3 acres (30.1 ha)
- Built: 1899
- Architect: Carrère_and_Hastings; Stone, Carpenter & Willson
- Architectural style: Renaissance
- MPS: Warwick MRA
- NRHP reference No.: 83000174
- Added to NRHP: August 18, 1983

Aldrich Mansion is a late 19th-century property owned by the Roman Catholic Diocese of Providence since 1939. It is located by the scenic Narragansett Bay at 836 Warwick Neck Avenue in Warwick, Rhode Island, south of Providence, Rhode Island. Originally called Indian Oaks, and once the Senator Nelson W. Aldrich Estate, the extensive estate was developed in 1899 by Nelson W. Aldrich (1841–1915), a Republican Party politician who dominated state politics of the period. The main estate house is a sprawling stone French Renaissance structure with lavish interior decoration, designed by prominent architecture firm Carrère and Hastings and local architects Stone, Carpenter & Willson. The estate's surviving outbuildings include a boathouse and a caretaker's house, the latter located across Warwick Neck Avenue from the main estate. Aldrich's heirs sold the property to the Roman Catholic church in 1939, and it was adapted for use as a seminary. The property now known as "The Aldrich Mansion" still belongs to the Diocese of Providence, and is now available as a site for weddings, formal occasions, business conferences, etc. It is also occasionally used for film and television productions.

The estate was listed on the National Register of Historic Places in 1983.

== Brief history ==
The estate was originally built and owned by Senator Nelson W. Aldrich of Rhode Island and consisted of over 225 acres. The construction of the estate began in 1896 and was completed some 16 years later. In 1901, his daughter, Abby Aldrich, married John D. Rockefeller Jr. at the mansion. In 1939, the Senator's heirs transferred the Aldrich Mansion and 100 acres to the Roman Catholic Diocese of Providence for approximately $75,000. From 1946 to 1983, Our Lady of Providence Seminary was housed at the Aldrich Mansion. In 1955, the seminary relocated to a new, 100,000 square feet (9,300 m^{2}), purpose built school in Providence; the Bishop Hendricken High School then used the estate as its "Senior Campus" for a decade. The facilities were later leased to the Overbrook Academy, a Catholic boarding school for girls, for almost 20 years.

The estate is currently set on 74.3 acres (30.1 ha). It consists of the French-inspired mansion, a gatehouse, 10,000 square feet (930 m^{2}) stables, a 7,500 square feet (700 m^{2}) boathouse, a 15,000 square feet (1,400 m^{2}) seminary chapel, as well as the former seminary's classrooms, dormitories, gymnasium, and dining facilities.

It stood in as William Parrish's mansion in the 1998 motion picture Meet Joe Black.

== Usage today ==
Still owned by the Roman Catholic Diocese of Providence, the Aldrich Mansion is currently used for wedding receptions, conferences, fund raisers, as well as occasional television and film production work. Since the venue is owned by the Diocese, no same-sex marriages are allowed to be performed on the premises.

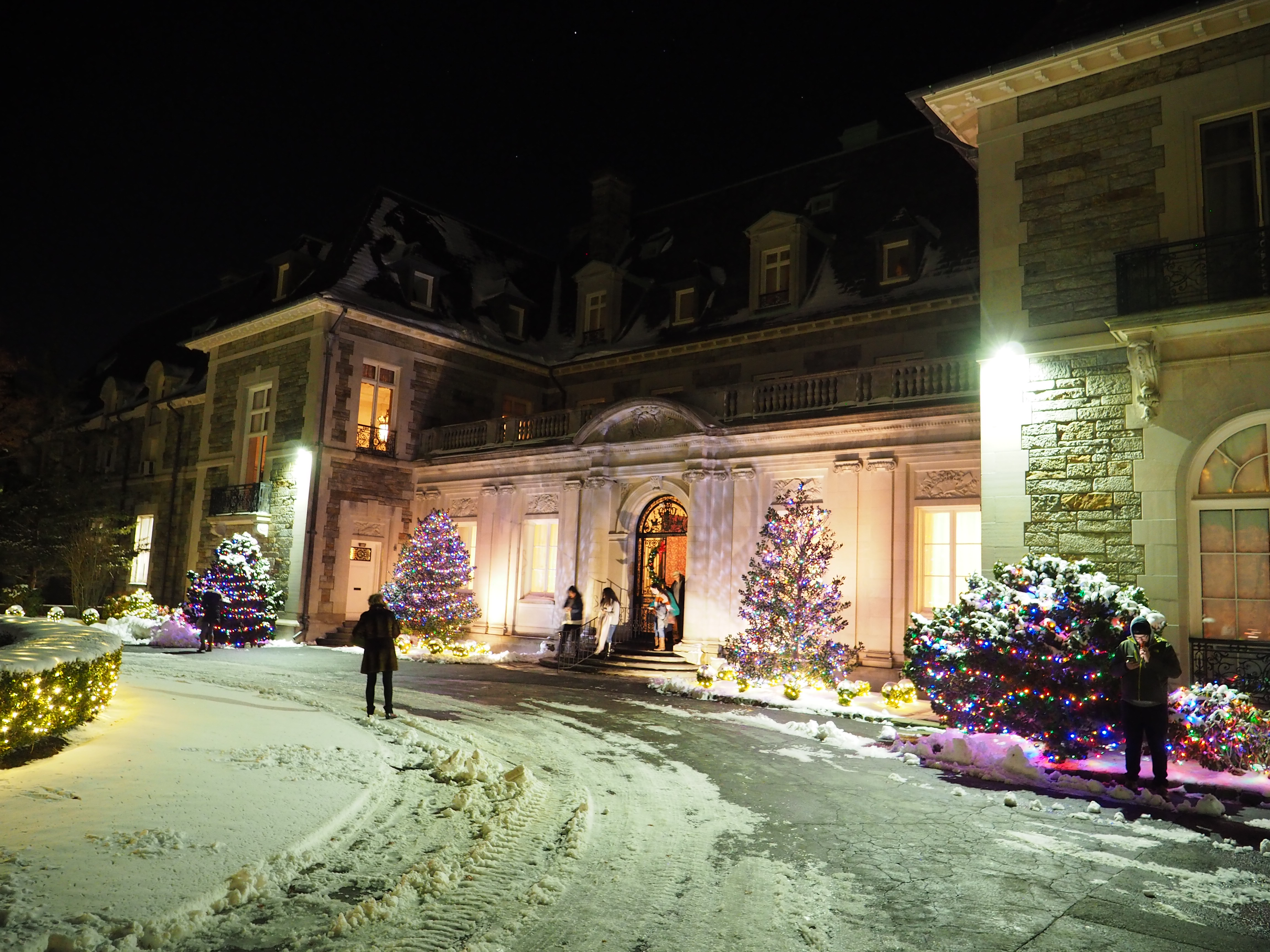
Aldrich Mansion, Warwick Rhode Island, December 2019

== See also ==
- Nelson W. Aldrich House, his primary residence in Providence
- National Register of Historic Places listings in Kent County, Rhode Island
