= Arnold–Palmer House =

Historic house in Rhode Island, United States

- U.S. National Register of Historic Places
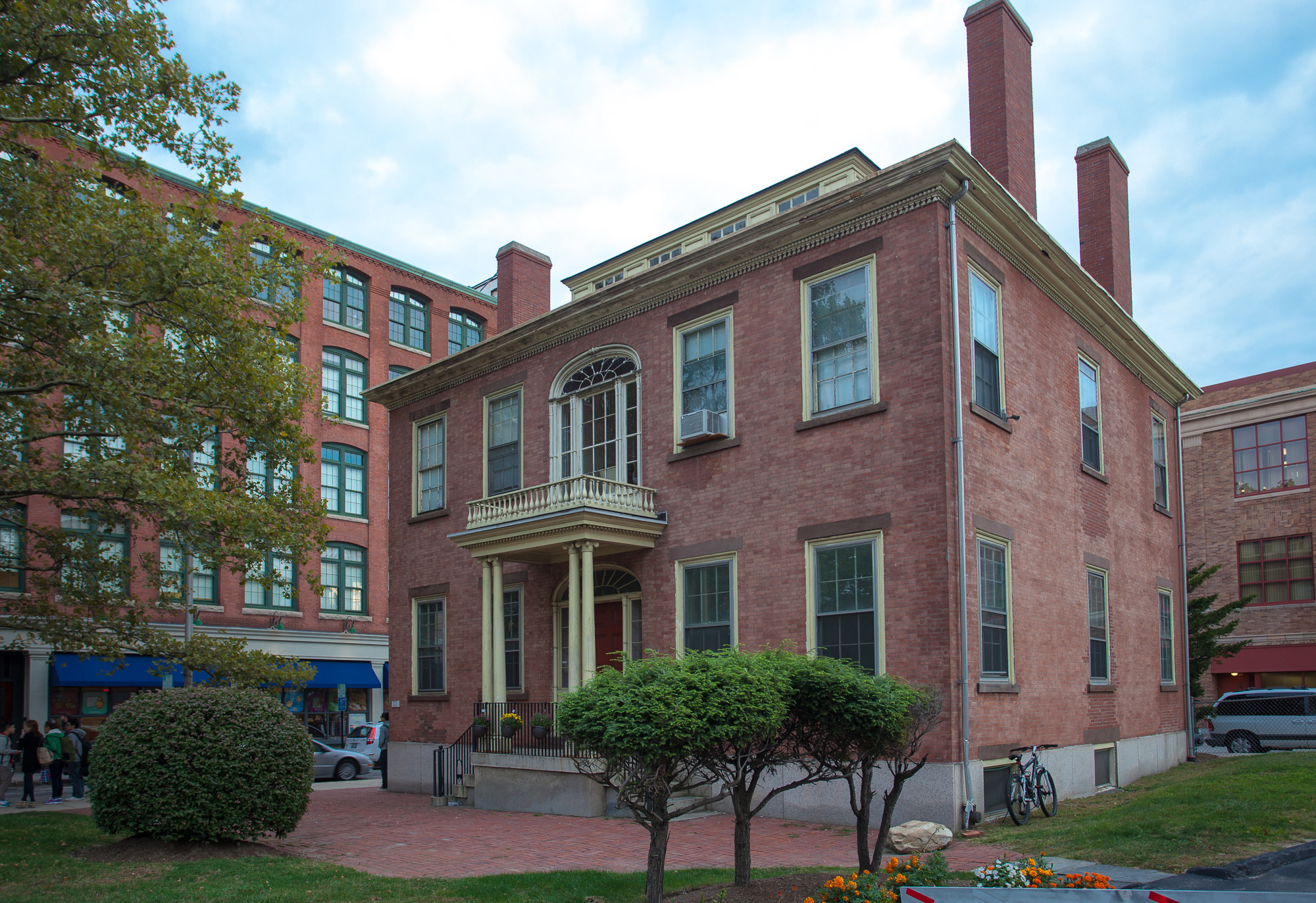

- Location within Rhode Island Location within the United States
- Location: Providence, Rhode Island
- Coordinates: 41°49′9″N 71°24′50″W
- Built: 1826
- Architect: Greene, John Holden
- Architectural style: Federal
- NRHP reference No.: 72000034
- Added to NRHP: January 20, 1972

The Arnold–Palmer House is an historic house at 33 Chestnut Street in Providence, Rhode Island. The Federal style house was built in 1826 for wealthy Providence merchant Daniel Arnold at a location on upper Westminster Street, where it was one of four nearly identical houses whose design was attributed to prominent local architect John Holden Greene by preservationist Norman Isham. This house is the only one of the four still standing, having been moved to its present location in 1967 as part of the Weybosset Hill urban redevelopment project.

The house is a brick structure, two stories high and five bays wide, with a hip roof topped by a small monitor. It has four chimneys rising from its exterior side walls. Its center entry is flanked by sidelight windows, topped by a fanlight window, and sheltered by a portico supported by paired Ionic columns. The window above the entry is a 1968 alteration salvaged from a house of similar vintage in Pawtucket. The interior has retained much of its original woodwork, despite the numerous uses the house has seen.

The house was listed on the National Register of Historic Places in 1972.

== Gallery ==
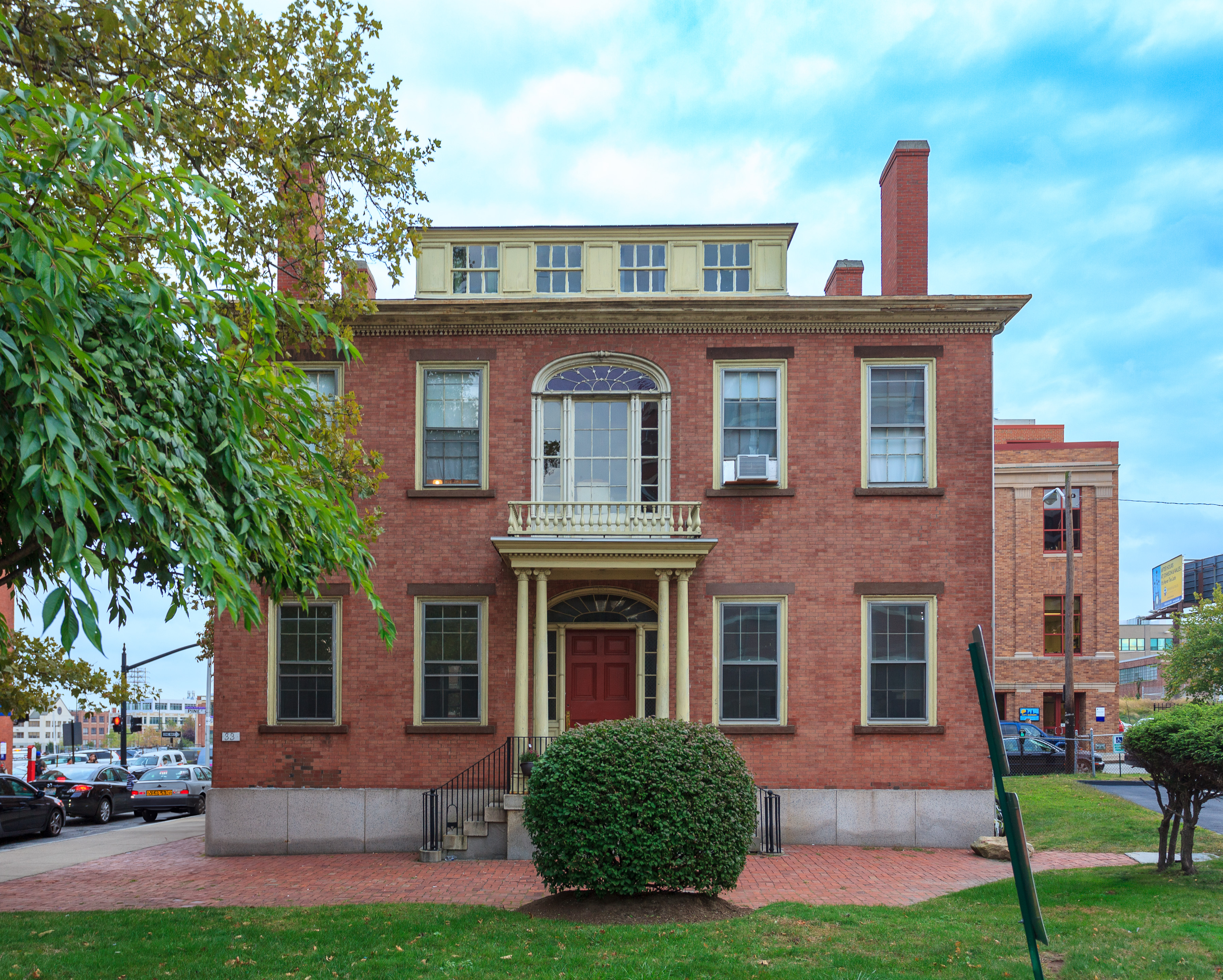
Front view

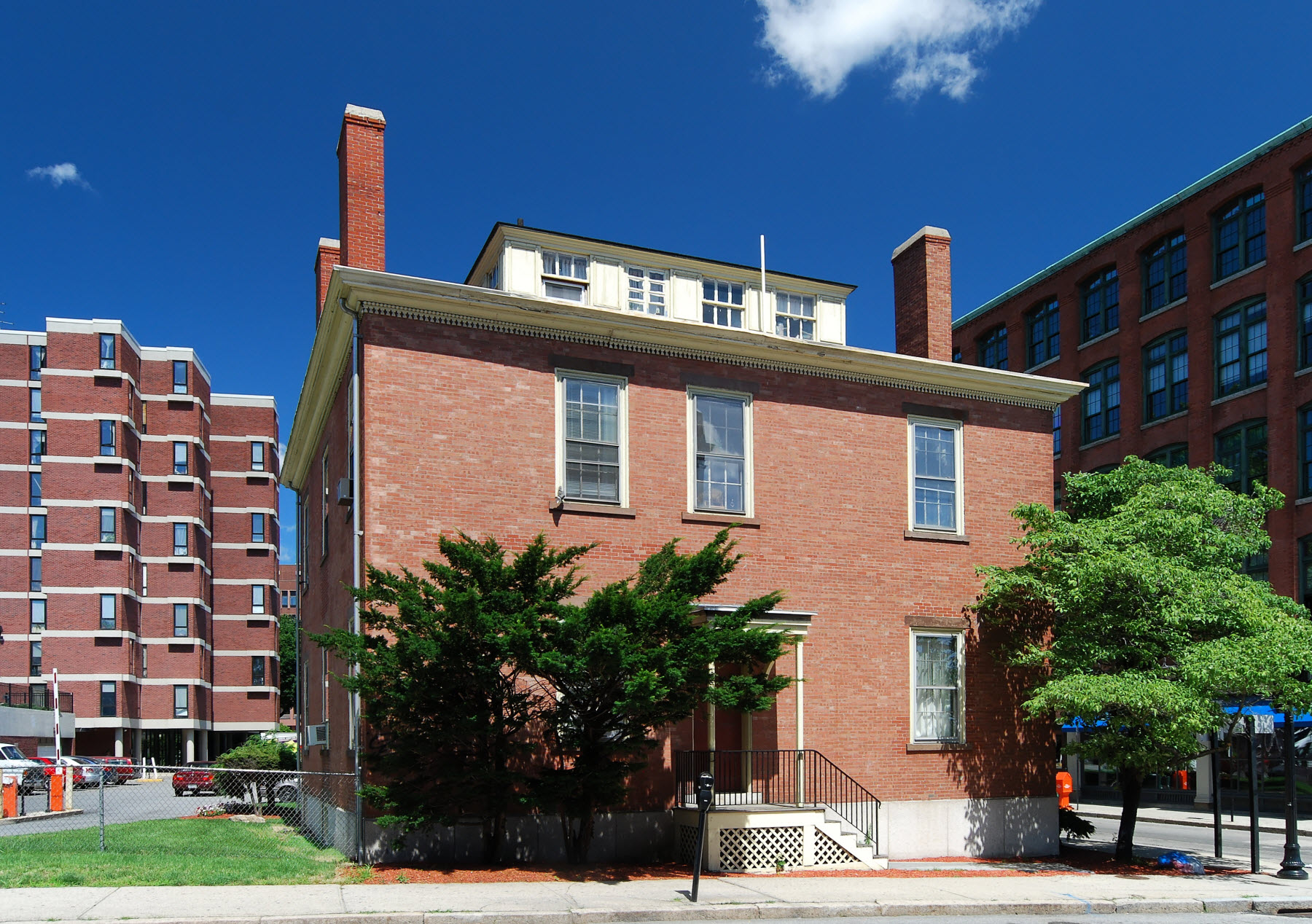
Side view

== See also ==
- National Register of Historic Places listings in Providence, Rhode Island
