= Albert Gorton Greene =

American writer

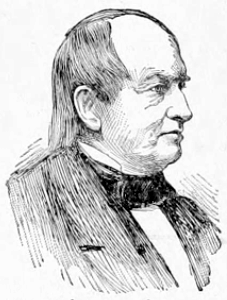
- Born: February 10, 1802; Providence, Rhode Island
- Died: January 3, 1868 (aged 65); Cleveland, Ohio
- Education: Brown University
- Occupations: Judge, poet
- Spouse: Mary Ann Clifford (m. 1824)

Albert Gorton Greene (February 10, 1802 – January 3, 1868) was an American judge and poet.

== Biography ==
Albert Gorton Greene was born in Providence, Rhode Island, on February 10, 1802. Graduating from Brown University in 1820, Greene was admitted to the bar of Rhode Island in 1823. In 1832 he was elected clerk of the City Council and clerk of the Municipal Court. He was Judge of the Municipal Court from 1858 to 1867, when he retired from ill-health to live with his daughter in Cleveland, Ohio. He is said to have drafted Rhode Island's original school bill.

In 1833 he published a quarterly, the Providence Literary Journal, but discontinued it after a year. He helped to found the Providence Athenaeum and the Rhode Island Historical Society, of which he was president from 1854 until his death. His library of 20,000 volumes included a collection of American poetry which eventually passed to Brown University, where it is known as the Harris Collection.

He wrote several popular poems, including the humorous poem "Old Grimes", "The Militia Muster", "Adelheid", "The Baron's Last Banquet", and "Canonchet".

== Family life ==
Greene was the son of John Holden and Elizabeth (Beverly) Greene. At the time of his birth, his father was at the beginning of a fifty-year career as an architect. In 1824 Albert Greene married Mary Ann Clifford of Providence. Their daughter, Arazelia, married Governor of Rhode Island Charles Collins Van Zandt.

Greene died in Cleveland on January 3, 1868.

== Works ==
- Recollections of the Jersey prison-ship; taken, and prepared for publication, from the original manuscript of the late Captain Thomas Dring, 1829
- Old Grimes, 1867
