= Nelson W. Aldrich House =

Historic house in Rhode Island, United States

- U.S. National Register of Historic Places
- U.S. National Historic Landmark
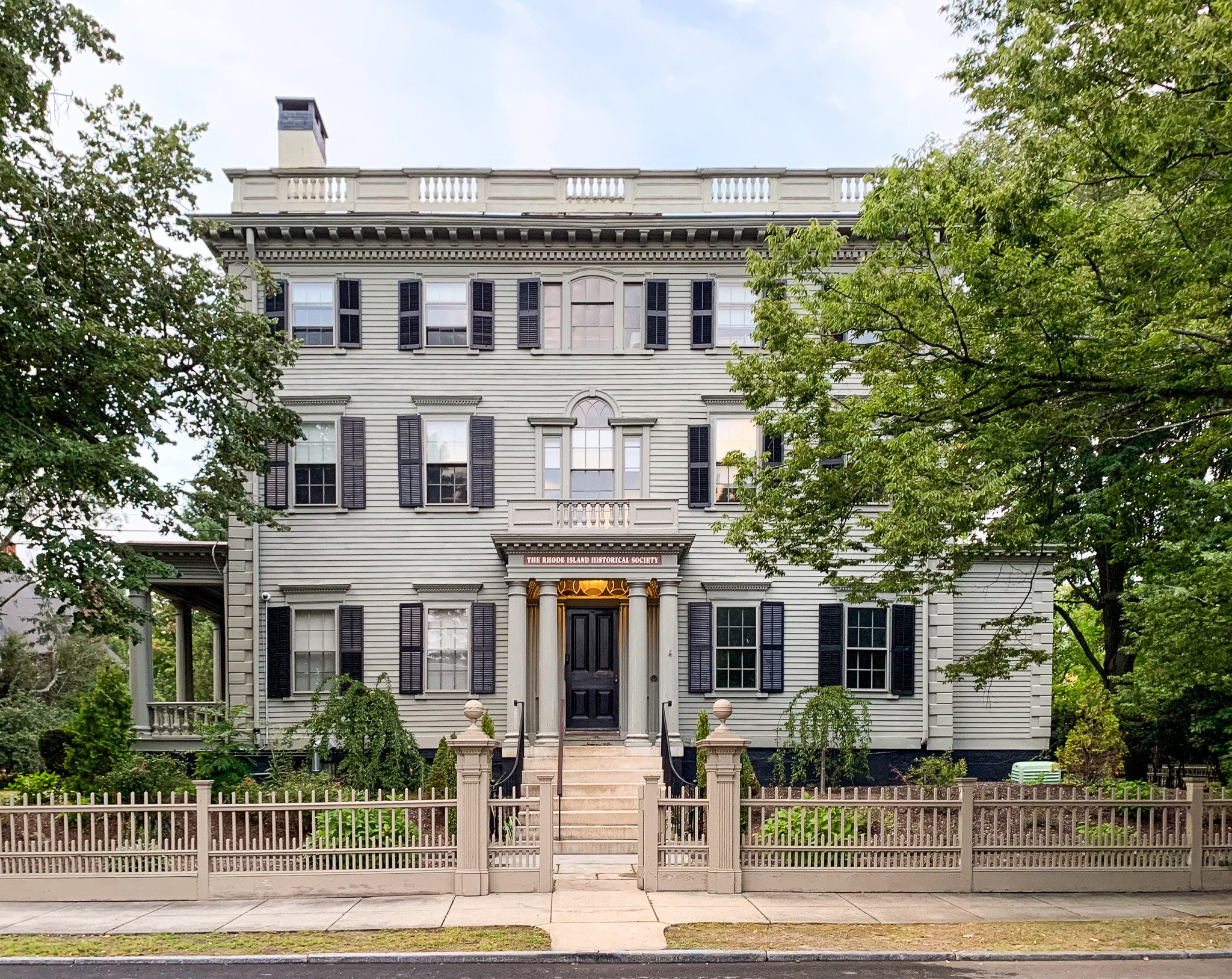
- Front elevation

- Location within Rhode Island Location within the United States
- Interactive map showing the location of Nelson W. Aldrich House
- Location: 110 Benevolent St., Providence, Rhode Island
- Coordinates: 41.8253°N 71.3957°W
- Architect: John Holden Greene; Stone, Carpenter & Willson
- Architectural style: Federal
- NRHP reference No.: 76000040

Significant dates
- Added to NRHP: December 8, 1976
- Designated NHL: December 8, 1976

The Nelson W. Aldrich House, also known as the Dr. S. B. Tobey House, is a Federal-style house at 110 Benevolent Street in the College Hill neighborhood of Providence, Rhode Island. The house was the home of Nelson W. Aldrich, a U.S. Senator from 1881 to 1911. Aldrich was a dominant and controversial figure in the Senate, exercising significant control over the legislative process. This house, one of two surviving properties associated with Aldrich, was declared a National Historic Landmark in 1976. It is now a house museum operated by the Rhode Island Historical Society.

== House history ==
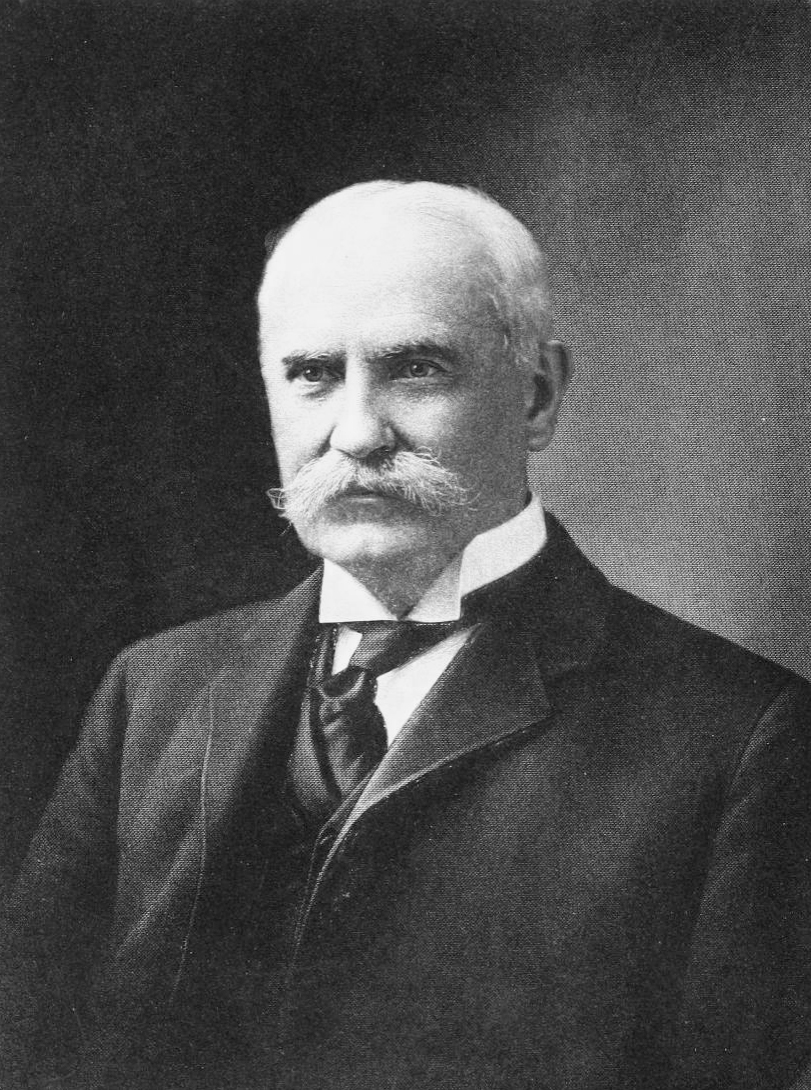
Nelson W. Aldrich

Robert S. Burroughs hired John Holden Greene to build the house in 1821. The house passed through several owners before Aldrich purchased it. Sometime before 1838 the house was enlarged by Burroughs. The exact date beginning Aldrich's tenure in the house is uncertain: some sources cite a 1902 deed recording his purchase, while Aldrich biographer Arthur Johnson claims the family moved into this house in the 1890s.

In 1905, Aldrich had his preferred architects, Stone, Carpenter & Willson, thoroughly remodel the house. The most notable exterior alterations include the addition of a third floor and several porches. Aldrich made this house his primary residence until his death in 1915. Aldrich's daughter, Abby, married John D. Rockefeller Jr. Vice-president Nelson Rockefeller was named after his grandfather Aldrich. Abby's son Winthrop deeded the house to the Rhode Island Historical Society in 1974, and Aldrich House currently serves as the Society headquarters and offers changing Rhode Island historical displays.

The house was declared a National Historic Landmark and listed on the National Register of Historic Places in 1976.

Nelson W. Aldrich was born in 1841 in Foster, Rhode Island, and made a fortune while rising through the ranks of Waldron and Wightman, a leading Rhode Island wholesale grocer. He entered politics in 1869, and was elected to the United States Senate in 1881. In a 30-year career in that body, Aldrich was a resolutely pro-business Republican, supporting protectionist tariffs, frequently leading successful attempts to defeat or water down attempts to lower them, at times despite popular support for lowered tariffs. Following the Panic of 1907, Aldrich developed a plan for a new central bank that became, with modifications he opposed, the Federal Reserve System created by the 1913 Federal Reserve Act. Aldrich was also a key figure in formalizing the powers held by Senate political officers, resulting in part in the concentration of significant power in his own hands. He died in New York City in 1915.

== Description ==
The main block of the house is a three-story wood-frame structure resting on a stuccoed brick foundation. It has a low-pitch hip roof, with a cupola on top and two chimneys rising from the sides. There are porches on the sides, of which the one on the right has been enclosed. The main block is five bays wide and four deep, and is clad in wood clapboard with corner quoining. The roof line is decorated by modillions and a denticulated frieze, with a low wooden railing extending around the roof. The main entry is sheltered by a portico supported by pairs of Doric columns, with a Palladian window on the second level above and a smaller three-part window on the third level.

Three wings extend from the rear of the house. Deed research indicates that the large three-story wing immediately to the rear was built in the 1850s. The decorations on this wing are slightly simpler than those on the main block, but the roof railings match. A two-story addition extends further back from this ell, and a third addition encloses a space behind the enclosed right-side porch.

== See also ==
- National Register of Historic Places listings in Providence, Rhode Island
- List of National Historic Landmarks in Rhode Island
- Indian Oaks, Aldrich's Warwick estate
