= John Holden Greene =

American architect (1777–1850)

- Born: September 9, 1777; Warwick, Rhode Island, US
- Died: September 5, 1850 (aged 72); Providence, Rhode Island, US
- Occupation: Architect

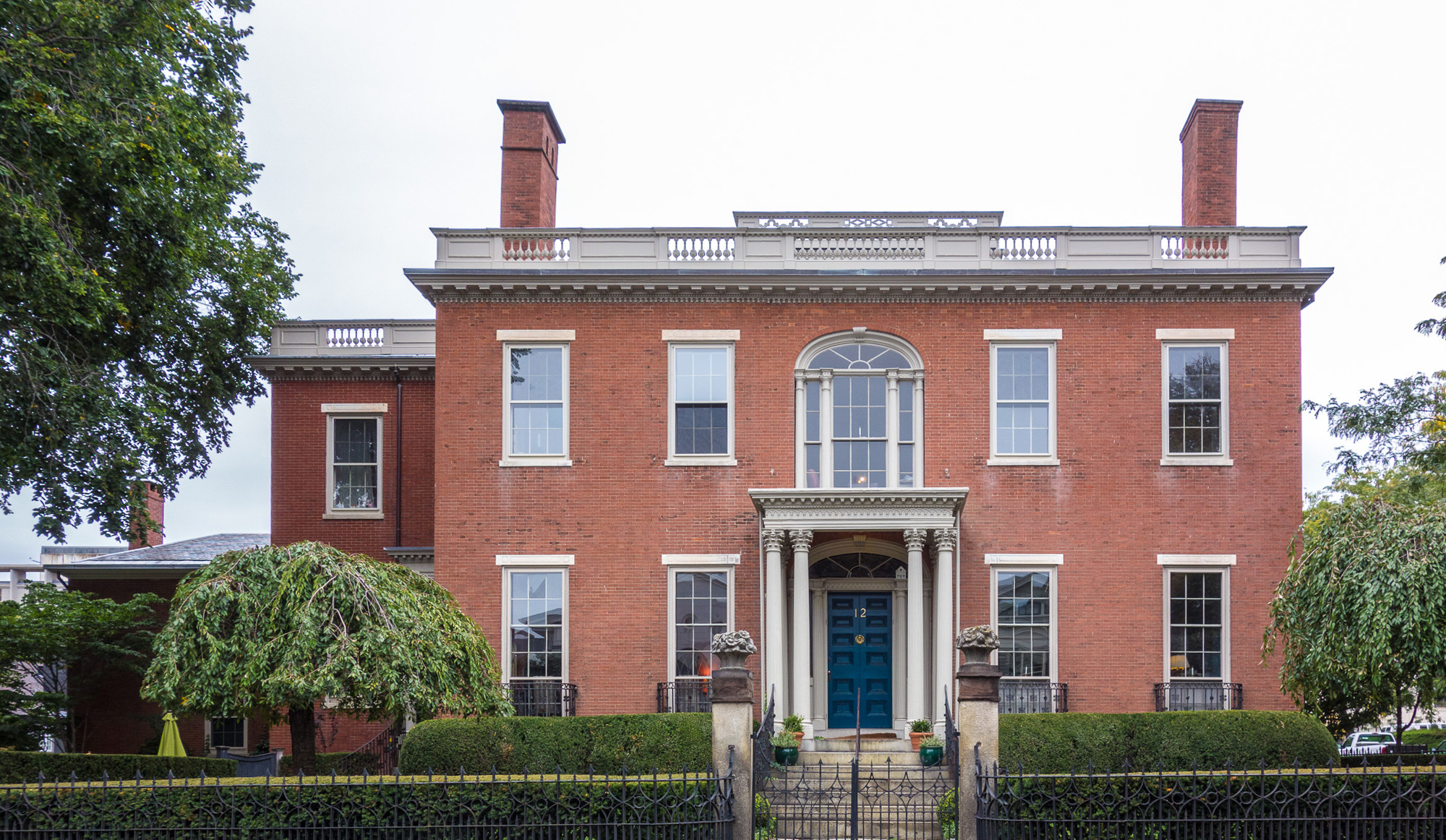
House for Candace Allen, Providence, Rhode Island, 1818-19.

John Holden Greene (September 9, 1777 – September 5, 1850) was an early nineteenth century architect practicing in Providence, Rhode Island. The bulk of his work dates to the late Federal period, and is mostly in the architectural style of the same name. Greene is responsible for the design of over fifty buildings built in the city between 1806 and 1830, almost half of which are still standing.

== Life and career ==
Greene was born September 9, 1777, in Warwick, Rhode Island, to Thomas Rice and Mary Greene (née Briggs). In 1794, at the age of seventeen, Greene went to Providence and apprenticed himself to housewright Caleb Ormsbee. Greene completed his apprenticeship and remained in Ormsbee's employ until his death in 1807. Greene then began to work at the same trade under his own name. By 1824, he was listed in the Providence directory as an architect, rather than as carpenter or housewright. He practiced as an architect until his death, but very few buildings can be positively attributed to him after 1830. This is believed to be related to his bankruptcy that resulted from the Panic of 1837 and the depression that followed.

During his career, Greene had many apprentices. The most prominent of these was James C. Bucklin, a successful Providence architect who was co-designer of the Providence Arcade.

== Personal life ==
In 1800, Greene married Elizabeth Beverly. They had four children who lived to adulthood. Their eldest child, Albert Gorton Greene, would achieve some success in the legal profession.

Greene died September 5, 1850, in Providence. He was buried in the North Burial Ground, where his wife would join him in 1856.

== Influence and legacy ==
During this period, Greene was influential in introducing the L-shaped plan to domestic design. He also introduced the Gothic style to Providence with his house for Sullivan Dorr, completed in 1809. The distinctive early nineteenth century Federal architecture of the city is largely attributed to Greene and his apprentices. After 1830, his identified works were all designed in the Greek Revival style, though he did not become known for this style.

Though Greene's influence waned after the emergence of Greek Revival architects James C. Bucklin, Russell Warren and others, his style was revived in the late nineteenth and early twentieth centuries as part of the larger Colonial Revival movement.

The most prominent building of this era influenced by Greene's architecture is Pendleton House of the Rhode Island School of Design Museum, designed by Edmund R. Willson and completed in 1906. Willson, of the firm of Stone, Carpenter & Willson, was responsible for a number of houses in the Federal style. Norman M. Isham, who wrote a monagraph on the architect, also designed several houses besed on Greene's work including the Benjamin Aborn Jackson House in Barrington, Rhode Island, completed in 1913. Architects Albert Harkness, Wallis Eastburn Howe and the firm of Jackson, Robertson & Adams were also responsible for many houses and other buildings in the style. The Federal Revival in Providence lasted from roughly 1900 to 1940.

Much later, the architect Friedrich St. Florian referenced Greene's work in his design of a Postmodern house for Richard E. Edwards on Prospect Street in Providence, built in 1980-82.

At least four buildings attributed to Greene have been listed on the United States National Register of Historic Places.

== List of architectural works ==
- House for John Holden Greene, 33 Thayer St, Providence, Rhode Island (1806, altered)
- House for Sullivan Dorr, (Note: Greene introduced Gothic architecture to Providence with this house, using details based on the pattern books of Batty Langley.) 109 Benefit St, Providence, Rhode Island (1809)
- Episcopal Cathedral of St. John, 271 N Main St, Providence, Rhode Island (1810)
- House for Robert S. Burrough, 6 Cooke St, Providence, Rhode Island (1810)
- Bristol County Courthouse (former), (Note: The architect of the building is not documented, though Rhode Island architectural historian William Jordy has argued that Greene is the most likely designer. The name of Russell Warren has also been offered as a possible designer.) 240 High St, Bristol, Rhode Island (1816–18, NRHP-listed 1970)
- First Unitarian Church, 301 Benefit St, Providence, Rhode Island (1816)
- House for Benjamin Hoppin, 283 Westminster St, Providence, Rhode Island (1816, demolished 1875)
- Independent Presbyterian Church, 207 Bull St, Savannah, Georgia (1817–19)
- House for James Burrough, 160 Power St, Providence, Rhode Island (1818)
- House for John Larcher Jr., 282 Benefit St, Providence, Rhode Island (1818–20)
- House for William Wilkinson, 69 College St, Providence, Rhode Island (1818, demolished 1954)
- House for Candace Allen, 12 Benevolent St, Providence, Rhode Island (1819–20, NRHP-listed 1973)
- Middle House, Moses Brown School, 250 Lloyd Ave, Providence, Rhode Island (1819, NRHP-listed 1980) - Altered.
- House for Thomas Peckham, 395 Benefit St, Providence, Rhode Island (c.1820, altered)
- House for Robert S. Burrough, 110 Benevolent St, Providence, Rhode Island (1821, altered 1905, NRHP-listed 1976)
- House for Thomas Whitaker, 67 George St, Providence, Rhode Island (1821–24)
- Allendale Mill, 494 Woonasquatucket Ave, North Providence, Rhode Island (1822, NRHP-listed 1973)
- House for Philip Allen, 196 Nelson St, Providence, Rhode Island (1822, altered)
- House for John Holden Greene, 150 Power St, Providence, Rhode Island (1822)
- Franklin House, (Note: When the hotel was demolished, the facade was incorporated into the College Building, built on the site and completed in 1937 to a design by architects Jackson, Robertson & Adams.) 2 College St, Providence, Rhode Island (1823–24, altered)
- Granite Block, 6-18 Market Sq, Providence, Rhode Island (1823, demolished)
- House for Jonathan Baker, 67 Park Pl, Pawtucket, Rhode Island (1823)
- House for Stephen Waterman, 181 Weybosset St, Providence, Rhode Island (1823, demolished)
- Roger Williams Bank Building, 27 N Main St, Providence, Rhode Island (1823, demolished 1912)
- Comstock Block, 263-271 S Main St, Providence, Rhode Island (1824)
- Dyer Block, 199-215 Weybosset St, Providence, Rhode Island (1824, altered)
- Houses for George and William Bucklin, 8 and 10 Arnold St, Providence, Rhode Island (c.1824)
- First Universalist Church, 290 Westminster St, Providence, Rhode Island (1825, demolished 1873)
- House for Daniel Arnold, 33 Chestnut St, Providence, Rhode Island (1826, NRHP-listed 1972)
- House for Truman Beckwith, 42 College St, Providence, Rhode Island (1826)
- House for Edward Harris, (Note: When this house was demolished, the large second-floor window was salvaged and placed on Green's Arnold-Palmer House in Providence, then being restored. also called the Harris-Easton House.) 162 East Ave, Pawtucket, Rhode Island (1827, demolished)
- Dexter Asylum, 235 Hope St, Providence, Rhode Island (1828, demolished 1966)
- House for Benoni Cooke, 114 S Main St, Providence, Rhode Island (1828)
- House for Rufus Waterman, 219 Benefit St, Providence, Rhode Island (1830, altered)
- House for Benjamin Harris, (Note: This was unique among Providence houses in that its interior rooms were arranged around an octagonal rotunda.) 59 George St, Providence, Rhode Island (1835, demolished 1915)
- First Baptist Church, High and Summer Sts, Pawtucket, Rhode Island (1842, burned 1957)

== Gallery of architectural works ==
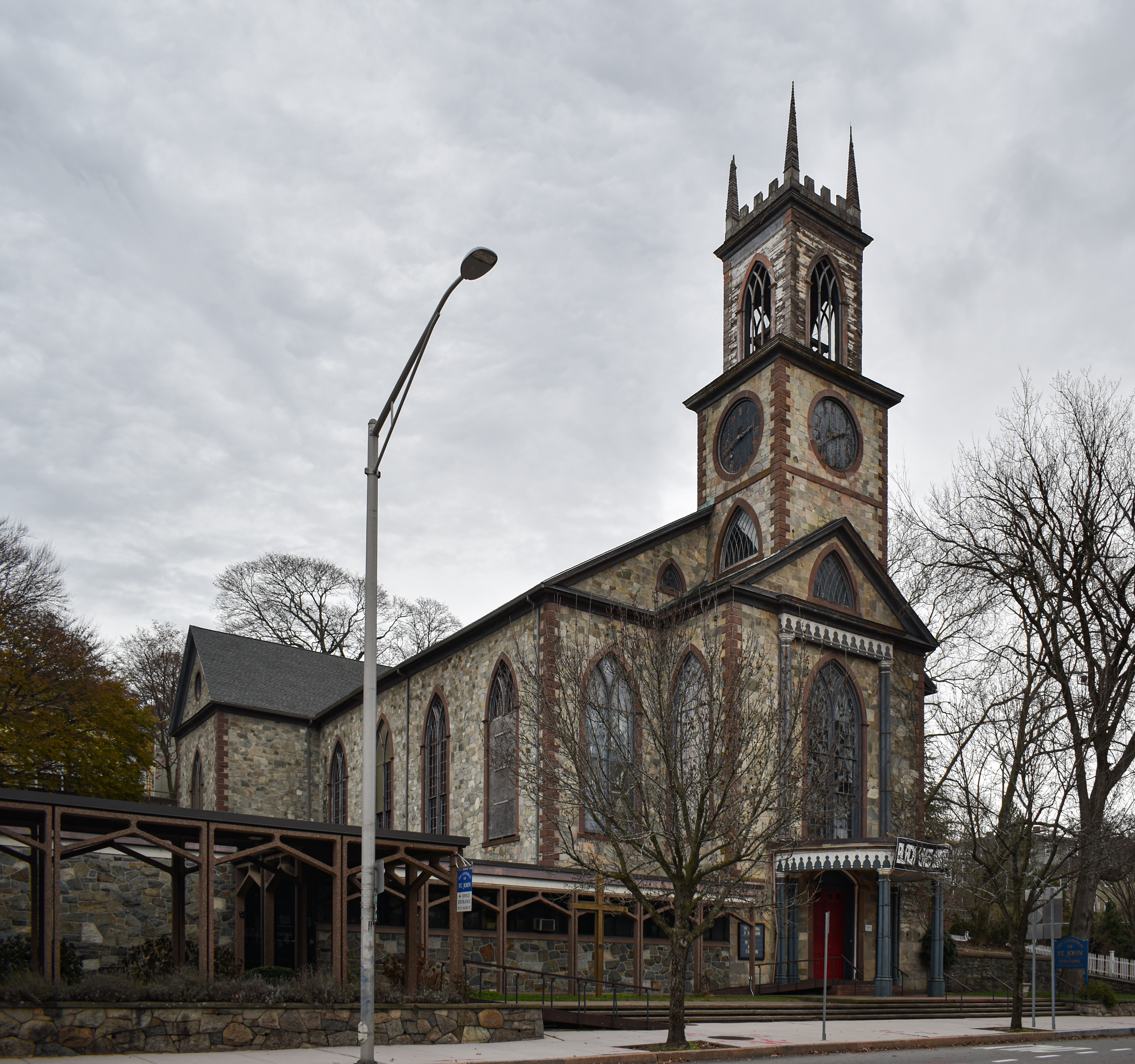
Cathedral of St. John, Providence, RI, 1810

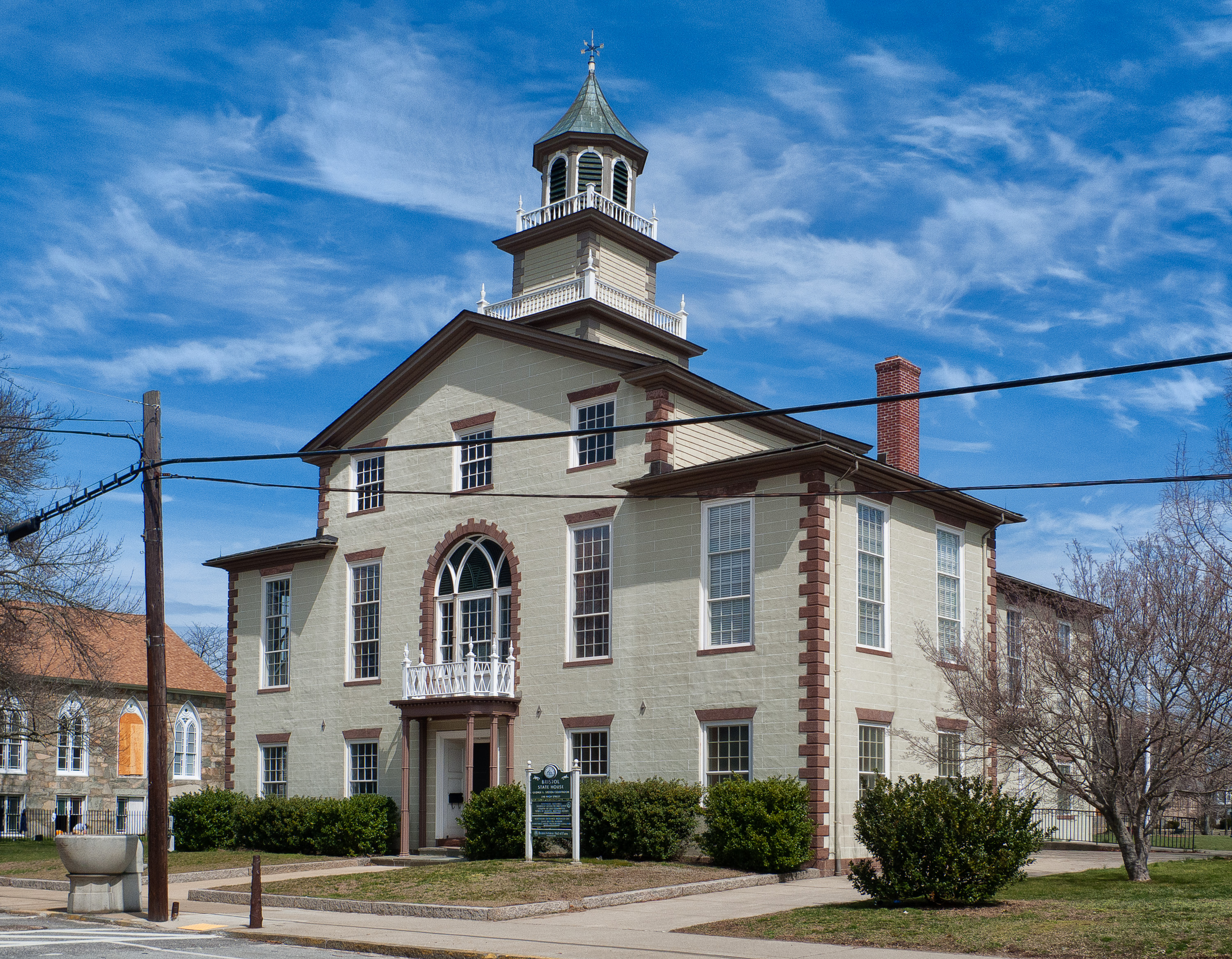
Bristol County Courthouse, Bristol, RI, 1816–18

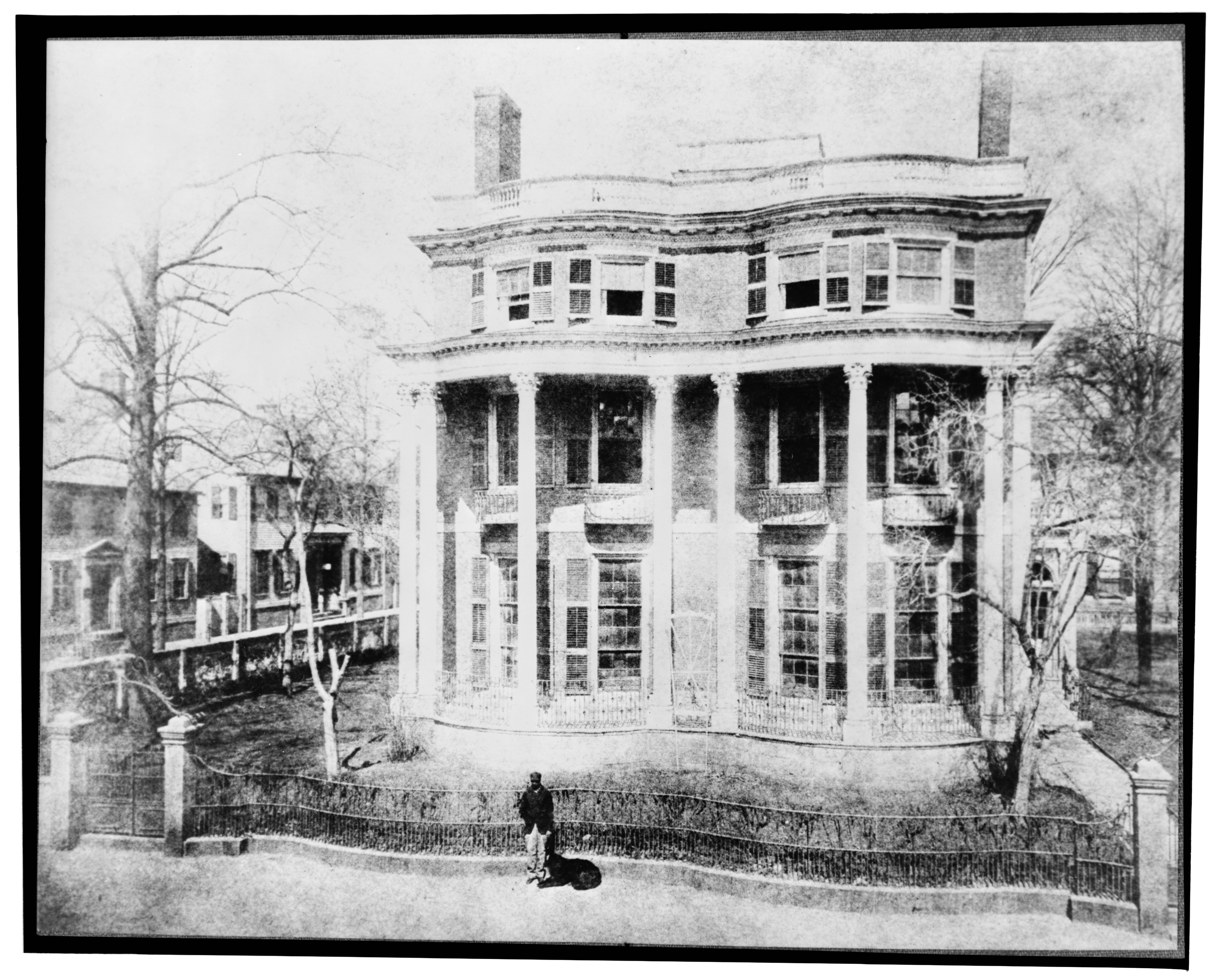
House for Benjamin Hoppin, Providence, RI, 1816

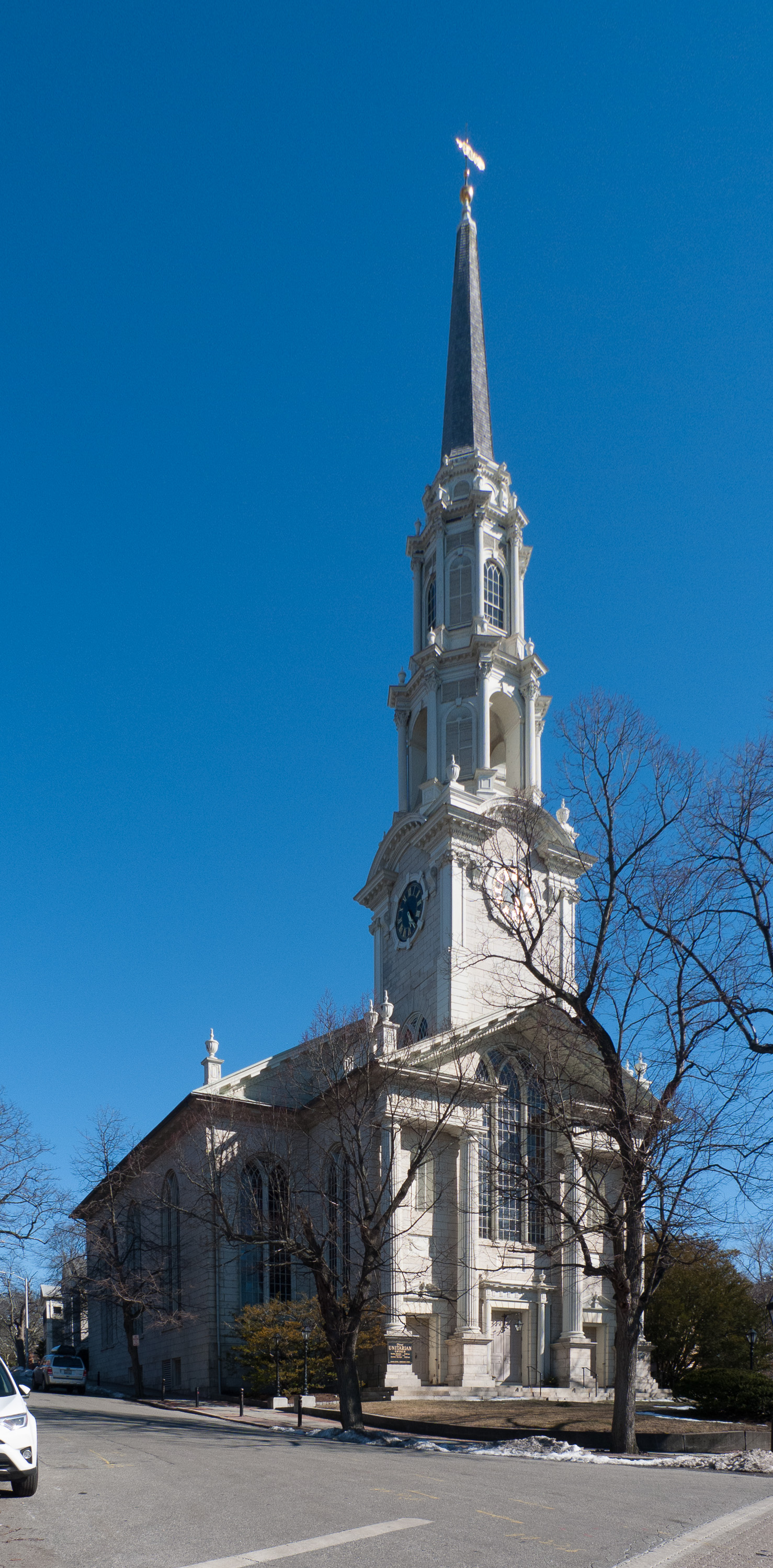
First Unitarian Church, Providence, RI, 1816

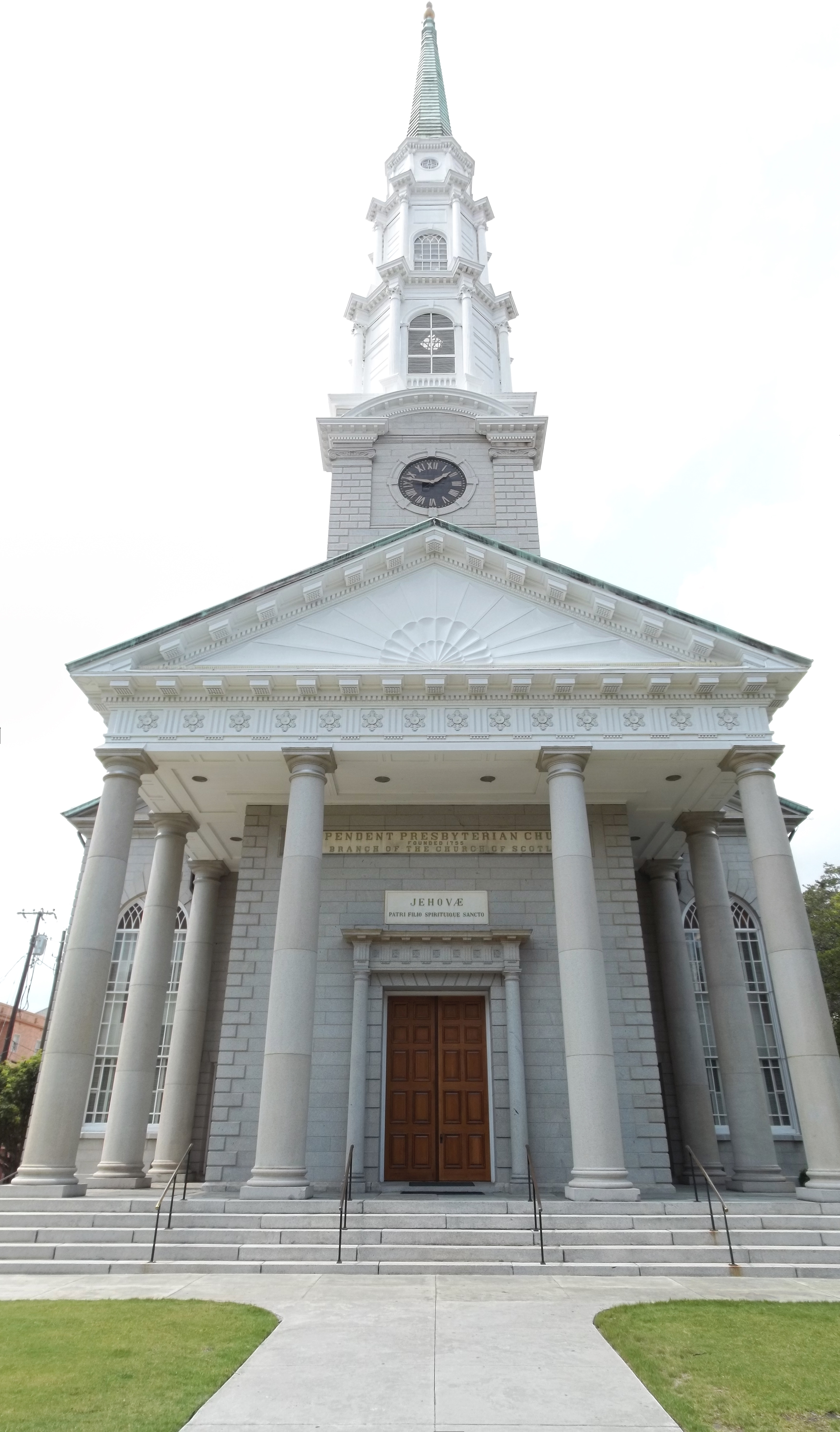
Independent Presbyterian Church, Savannah, Georgia, 1819

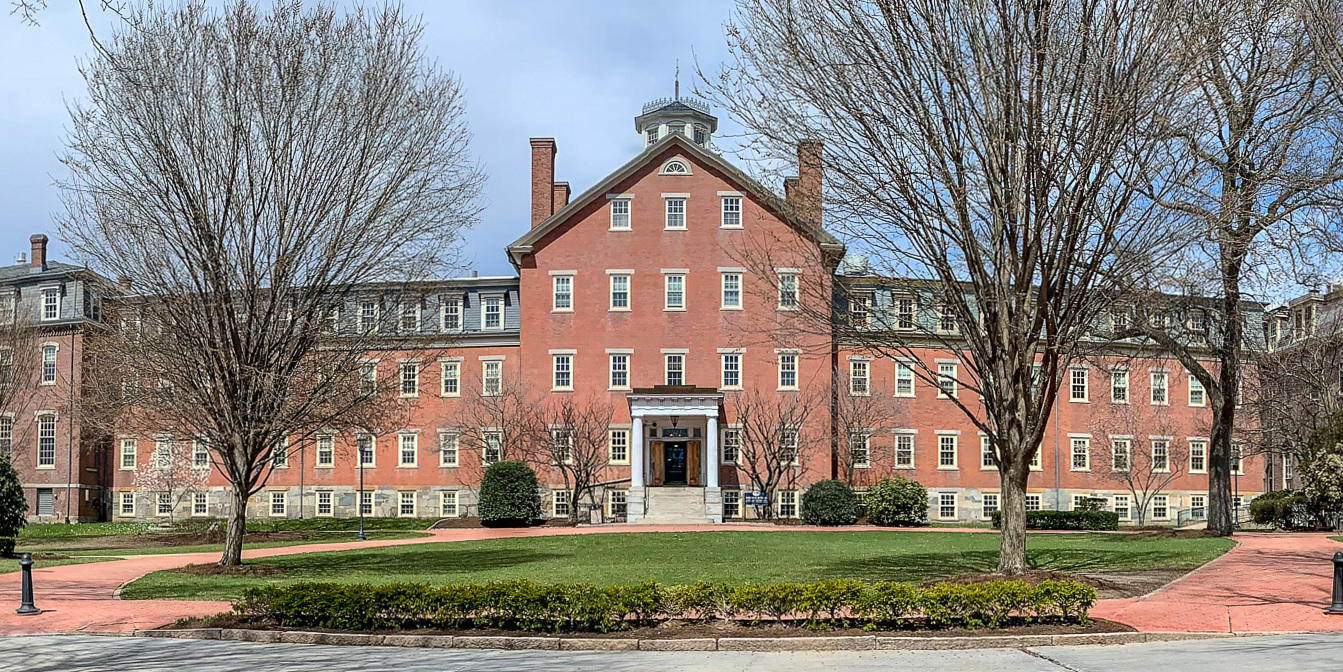
Middle House, Moses Brown School, Providence, RI, 1819

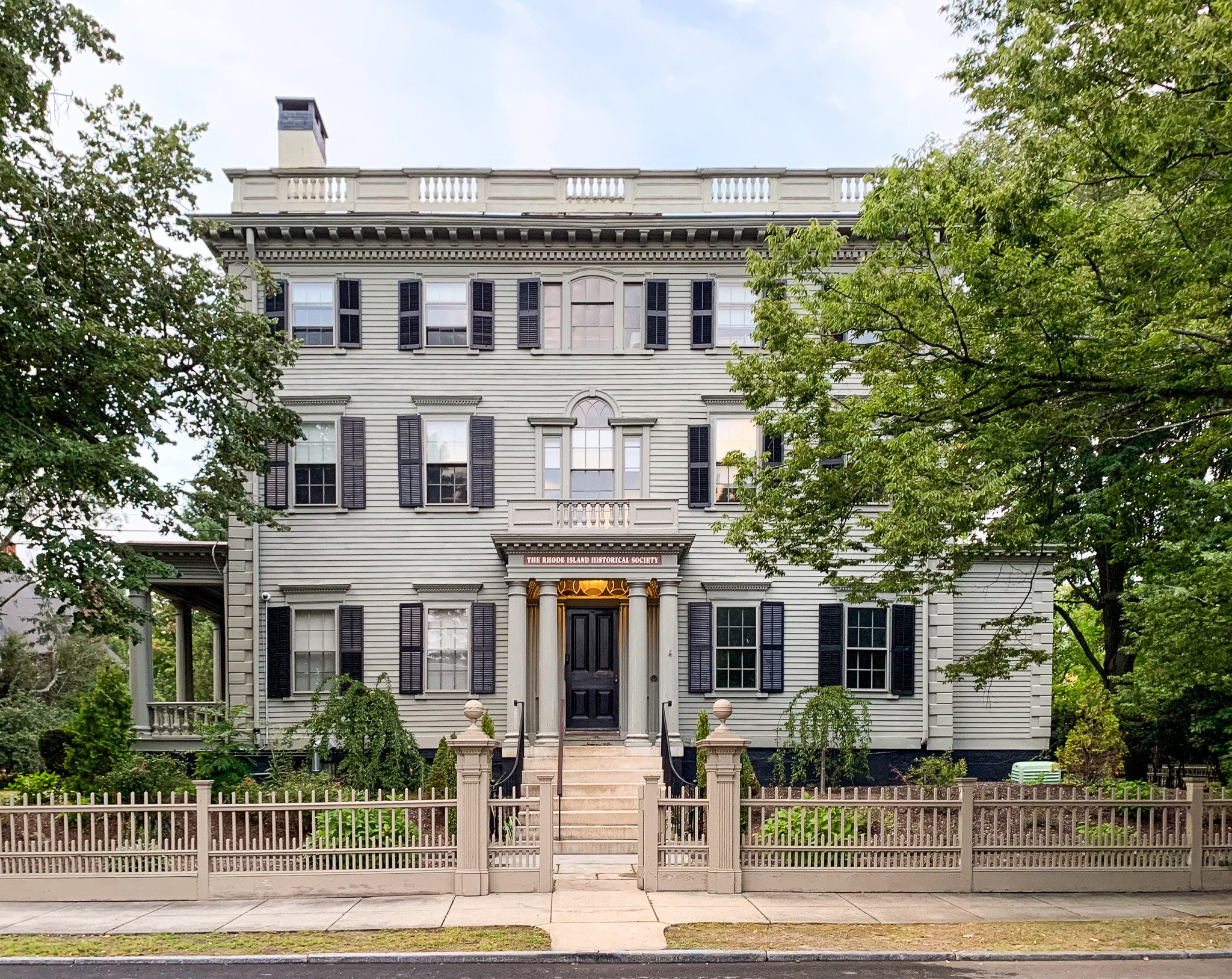
House for Robert S. Burrough, Providence, RI, 1821

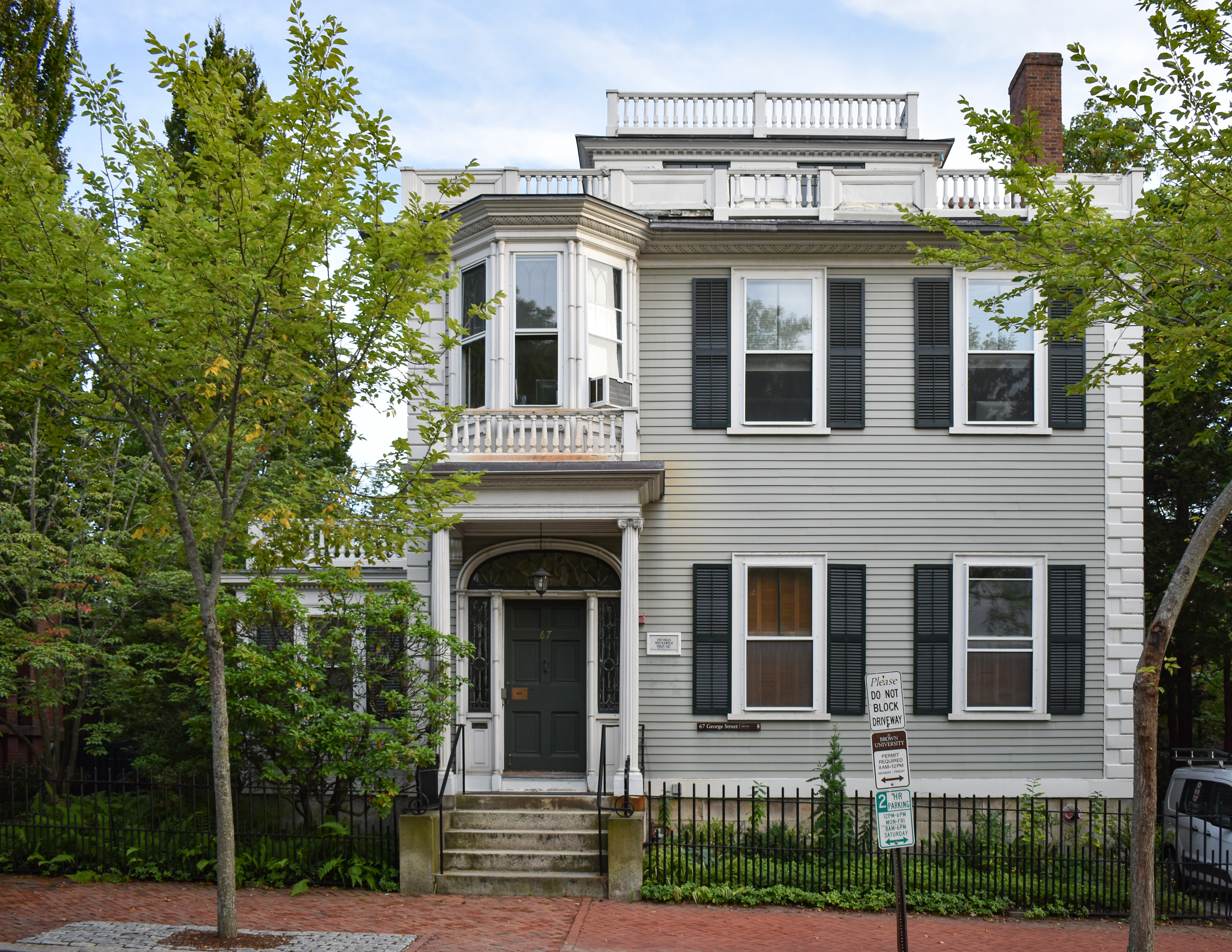
House for Thomas Whitaker, Providence, RI, 1821–24

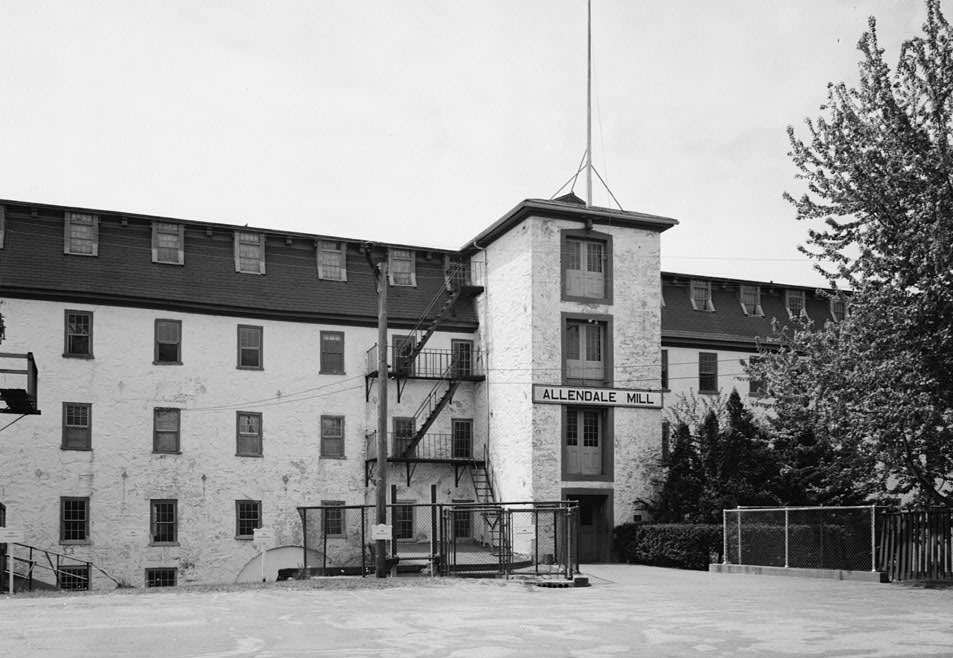
Allendale Mill, North Providence, Rhode Island, 1822

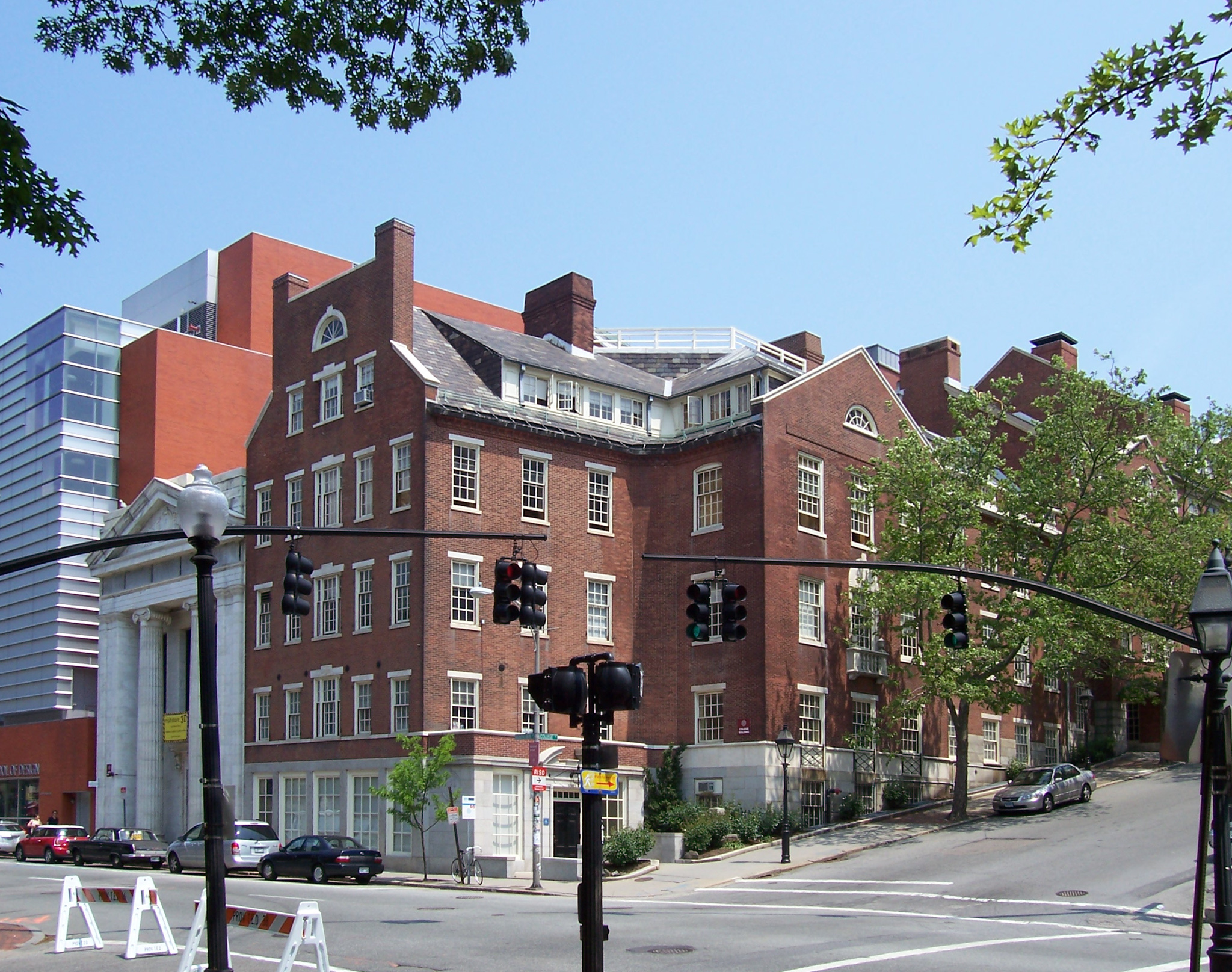
Franklin House, Providence, Rhode Island, 1823–24

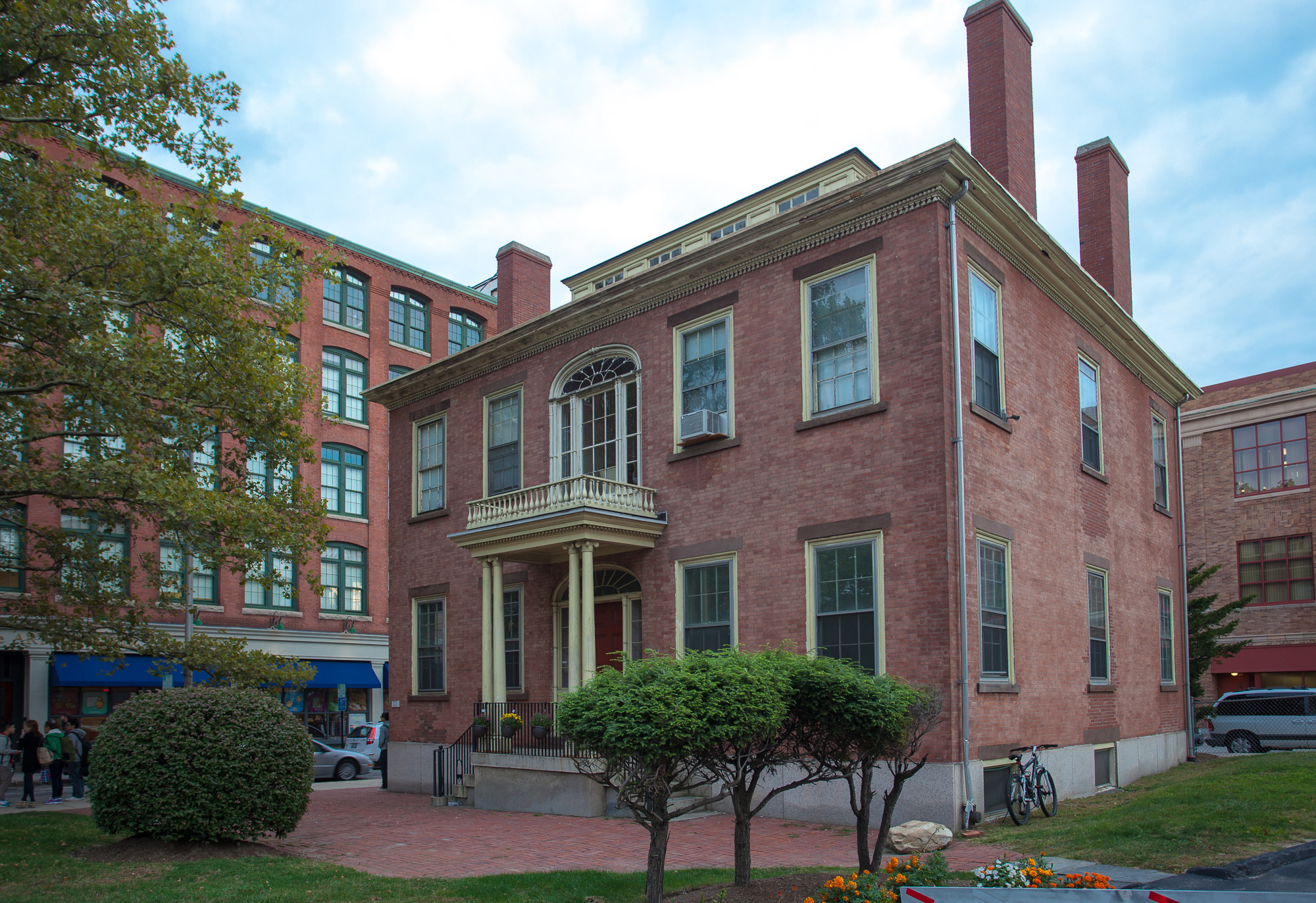
House for Daniel Arnold, Providence, Rhode Island, 1826

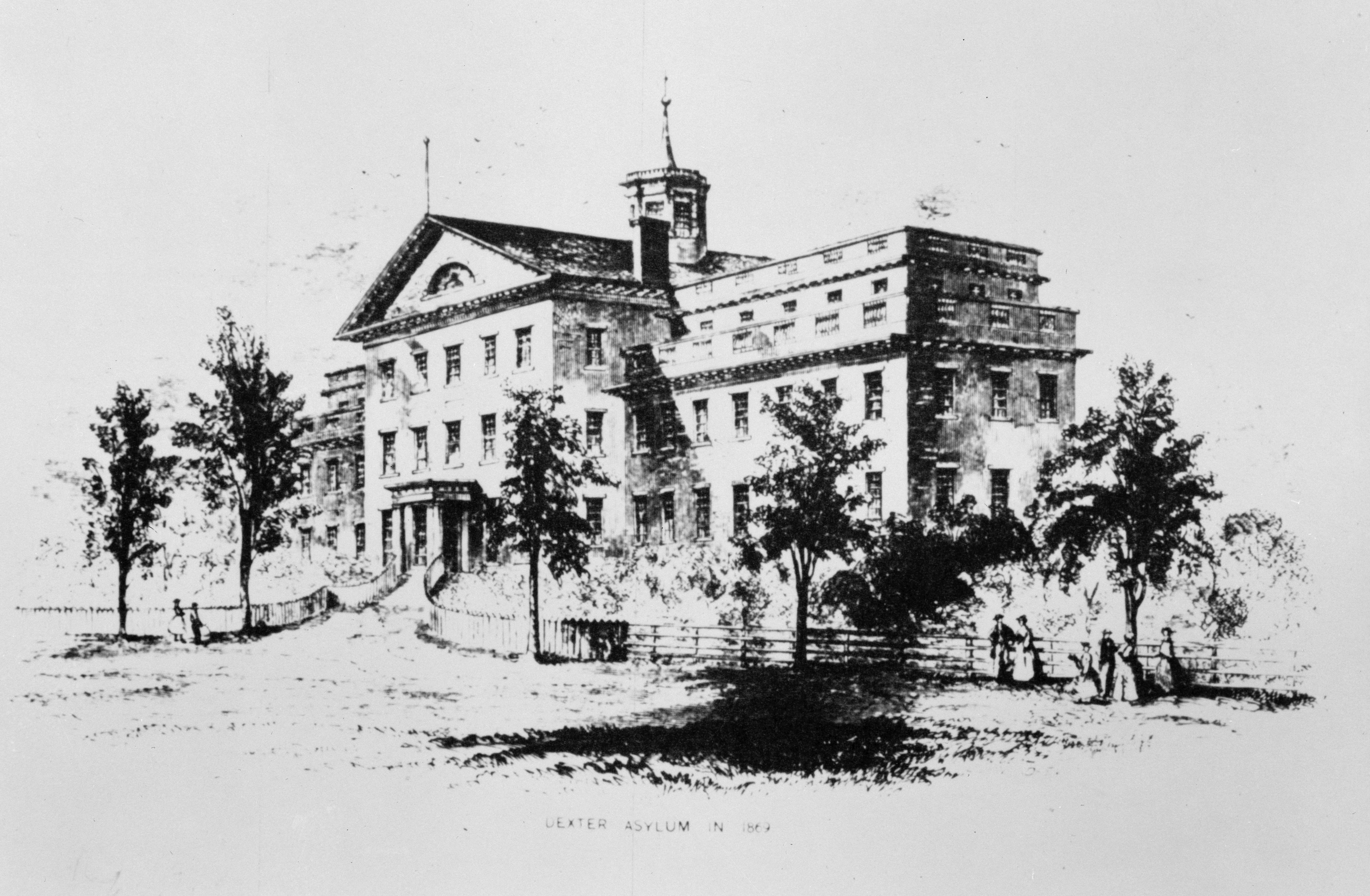
Dexter Asylum, Providence, Rhode Island, 1828

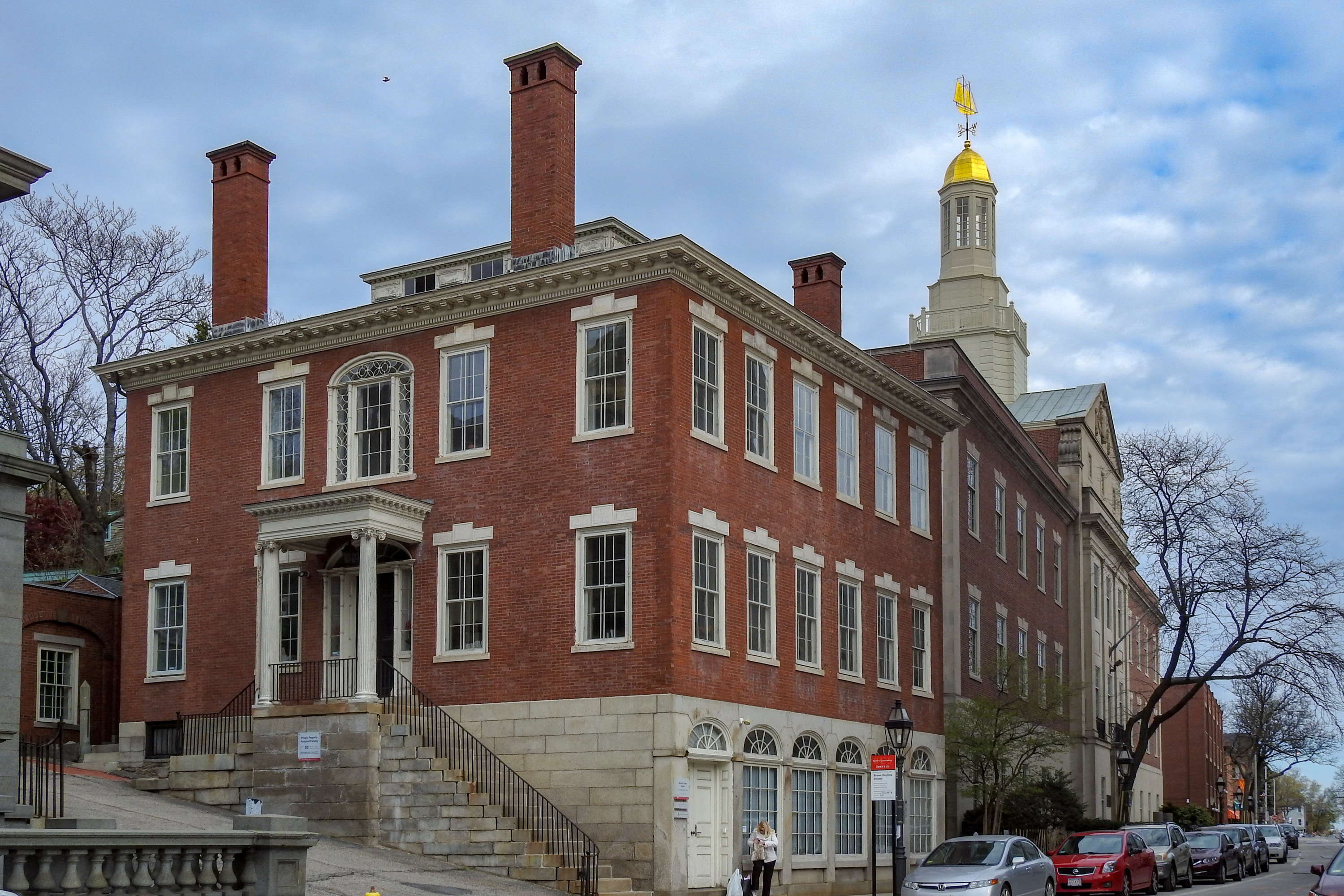
House for Benoni Cooke, Providence, Rhode Island, 1828

== See also ==
List of Brown University buildings
