= Bristol County Courthouse (Rhode Island) =

- U.S. National Register of Historic Places
- U.S. Historic district – Contributing property
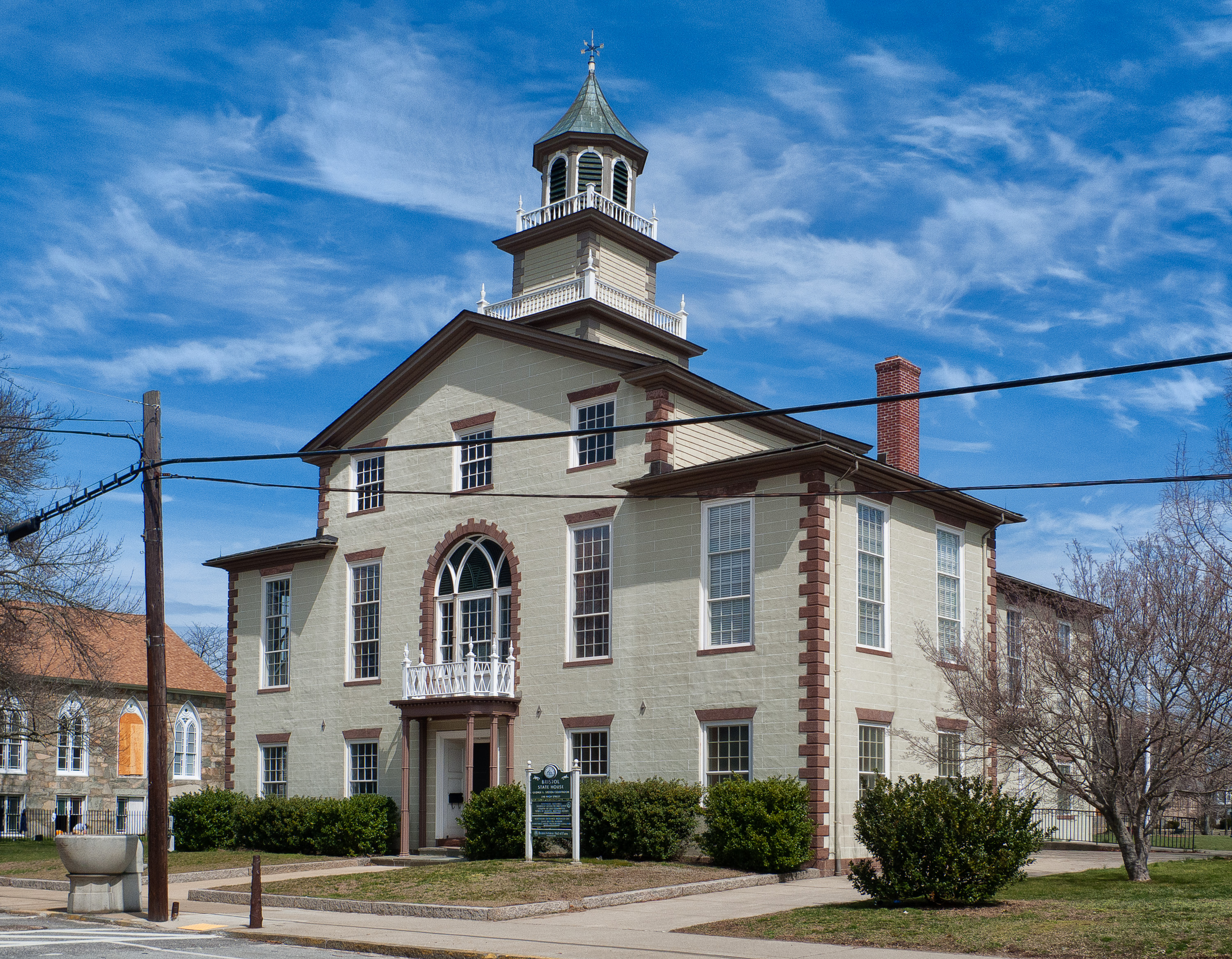

- Location within Rhode Island Location within the United States
- Interactive map showing the location for Bristol County Courthouse
- Location: Bristol, Rhode Island
- Coordinates: 41°39′48″N 71°16′17″W
- Built: 1816
- Architect: John Holden Greene; Howe & Church
- Architectural style: Federal
- Part of: Bristol Waterfront Historic District (ID75000053)
- NRHP reference No.: 70000011

Significant dates
- Added to NRHP: April 28, 1970
- Designated CP: March 18, 1975

The Bristol County Courthouse (or Bristol Statehouse) is an historic courthouse on High Street in Bristol, Rhode Island, USA built in 1816. It was originally one of five locations in Rhode Island which hosted the state legislature on a rotating basis, and served as the county courthouse through the 1980s. Currently the building is used for educational and community programs, meetings, and events.

== The building ==
The architect of the Federal style courthouse is unknown; official state records of the time do not list any individual involved with the building. There are good architectural and political reasons to believe the architect may have been Russell Warren or possibly John Holden Greene. The building's structure is of stone, originally faced in brick, although that has since been stuccoed over.

The original design of the interior of the building had a central staircase leading to a platform and split risers to the second floor. In 1836, the stairs were moved in a major redesign.

== History ==
In 1814, the state General Assembly held a competition for a new courthouse; they accepted Bristol's offer of a location on Bristol Town Common facing Bristol Harbor, which was then a major transportation hub.

The building was used between 1816 and 1854 as one of five locations for meetings of the Rhode Island House of Representatives and Senate. In 1854 the General Assembly decided to meet only in Providence or Newport.

The building housed municipal offices and courts, in addition to the state legislature. In the 1930s it was restored by Providence architects Howe & Church.

The building was listed on the National Register of Historic Places in 1970.

The building continued as the seat of Bristol County's court until the 1980s. The Bristol County Sheriff maintained offices there until 1997, when the building was purchased from the state for $1 by the Bristol Statehouse Foundation. The nonprofit foundation has worked to restore and maintain the building. Currently the building is used for education, community programs, meetings, and events. It also serves as the headquarters for the Bristol Fourth of July Committee.

== See also ==
- National Register of Historic Places listings in Bristol County, Rhode Island
