= Candace Allen House =

Historic house in Rhode Island, United States

- U.S. National Register of Historic Places
- U.S. National Historic Landmark District – Contributing property
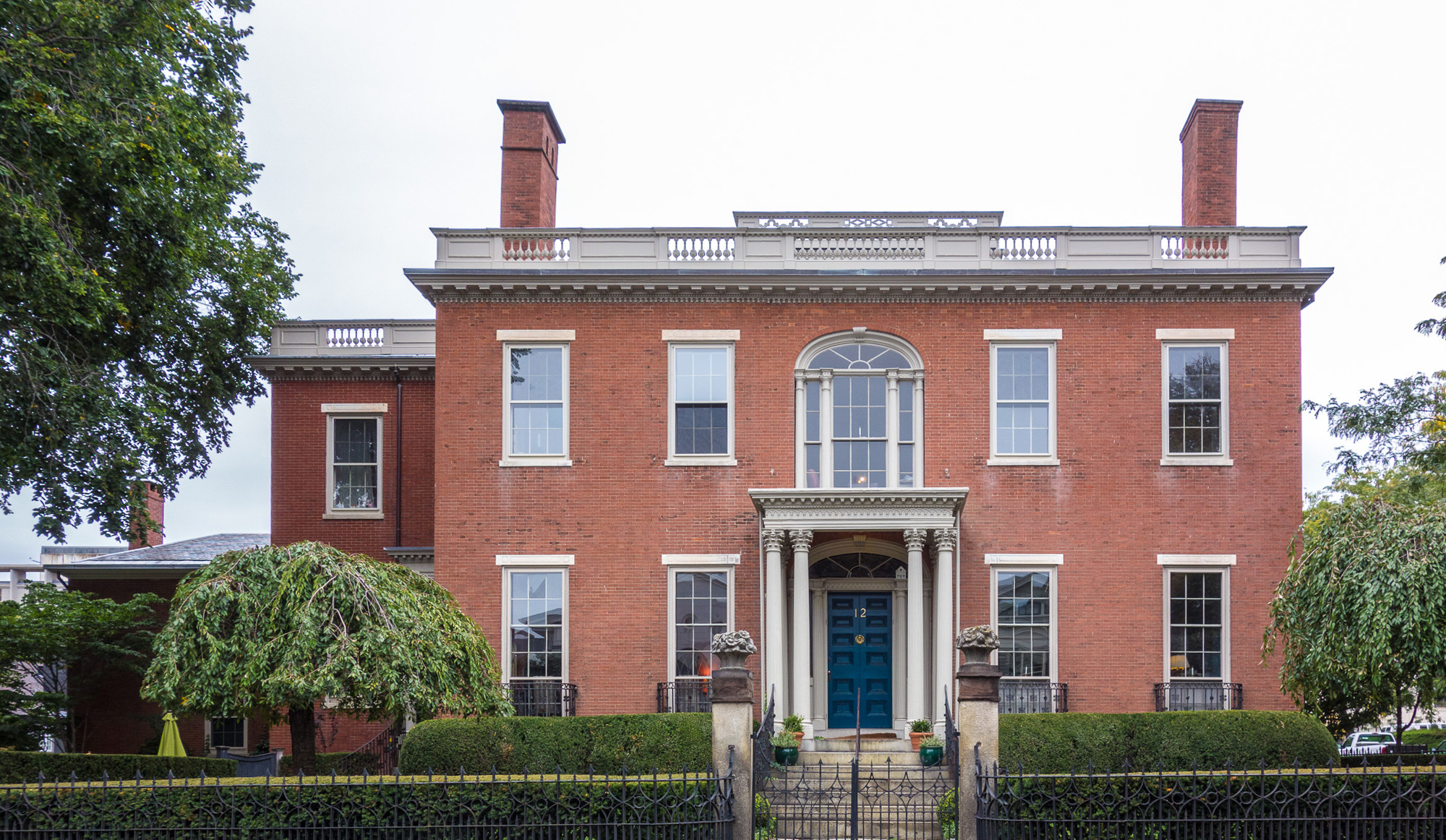
- Candace Allen House 2012 front view

- Location within Rhode Island Location within the United States
- Location: 12 Benevolent Street, Providence, Rhode Island
- Coordinates: 41°49′29.4024″N 71°24′15.3792″W
- Built: 1818
- Architect: John Holden Greene
- Architectural style: Federal
- Part of: College Hill Historic District (ID70000019)
- NRHP reference No.: 73000062

Significant dates
- Added to NRHP: April 11, 1973
- Designated NHLDCP: November 10, 1970

The Candace Allen House is a historic house located at 12 Benevolent Street in the College Hill neighborhood of Providence, Rhode Island, United States. Named after Candace Allen (1785-1872) an dauther of Zachariah Allen, a prominent Providence mill-owner.

The Federal style house was built in 1818–1820 by local architect John Holden Greene and added to the National Register of Historic Places in 1973. It is a brick two-story building with a hip roof topped by a small monitor section. It is five bays wide, with a center entry sheltered by a portico supported by Corinthian columns, and an elliptical window above. The interior follows a typical central-hall plan, and has elaborate interior detail including marble mantels, a U-shape stairway, ceiling cornices, undercut moldings, and walnut doors with silver hardware.

Candace Allen (1785-1872) was the older sister of Zachariah Allen, a prominent Providence mill-owner and inventor. Her fiancé was killed in the War of 1812, and she did not ever marry. The house was, as of its 1973 National Register listing, still in the hands of the Allen family.

== Gallery ==
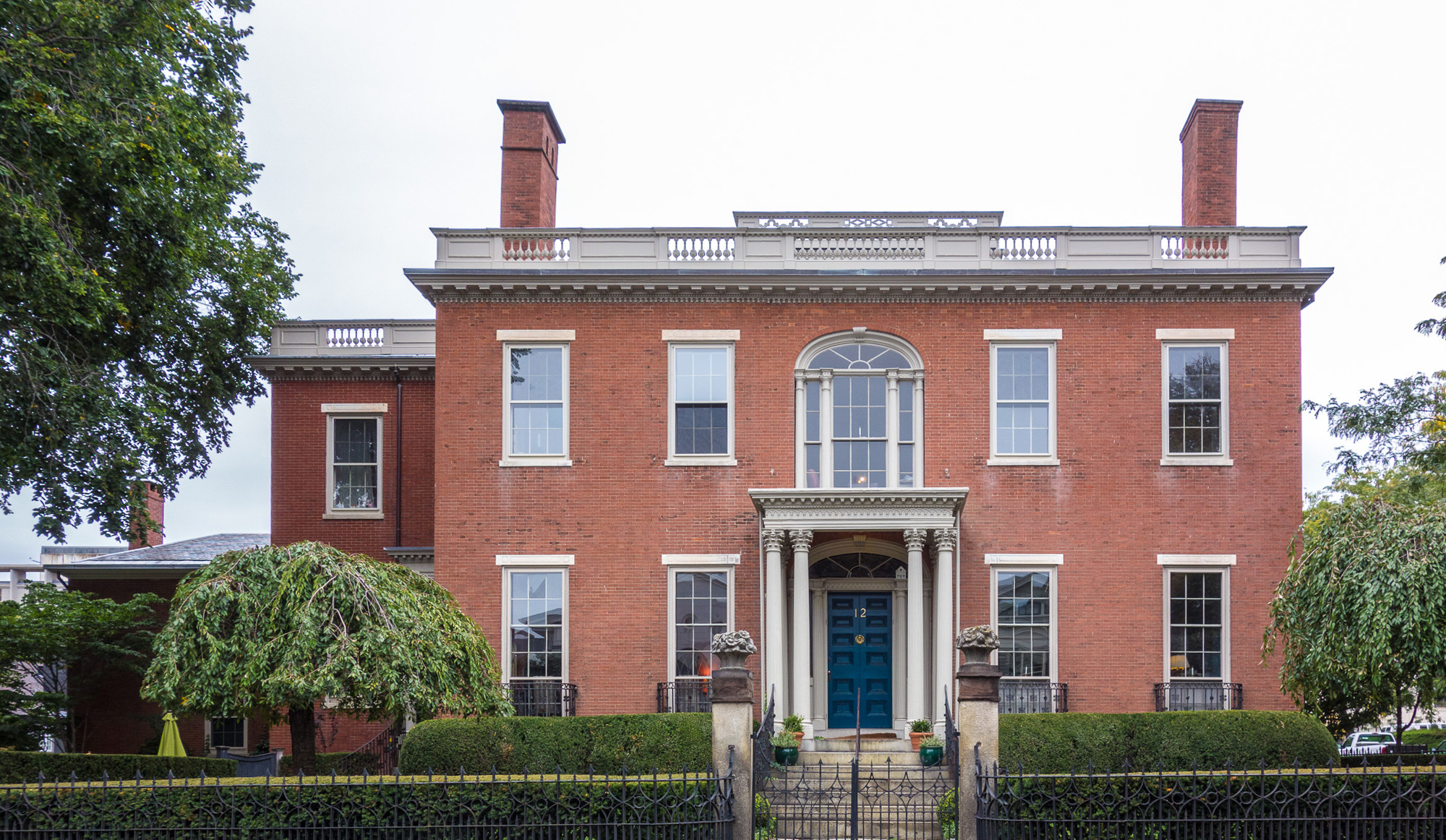
2012 Main (front) Entrance

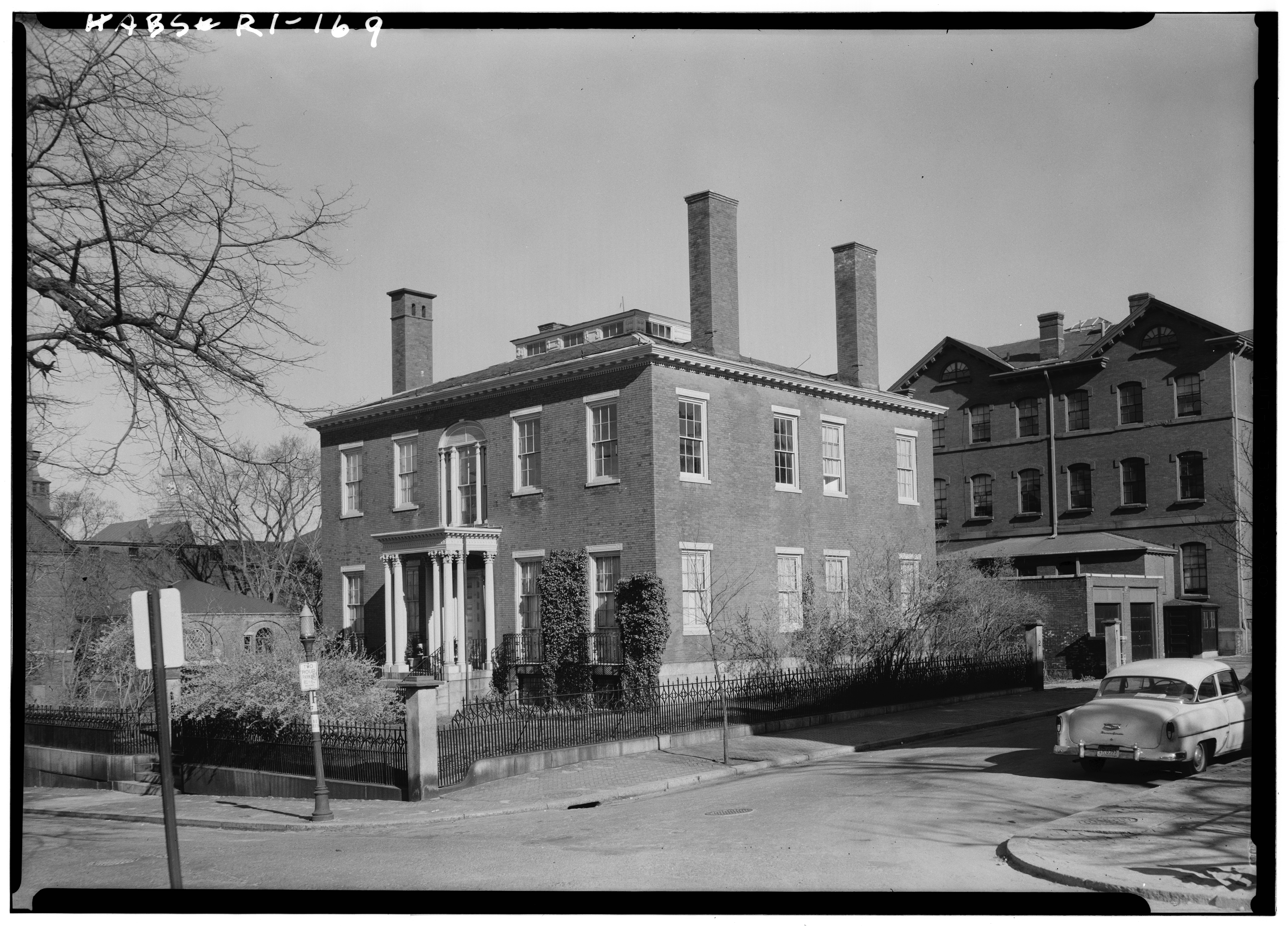
1958 SOUTH (FRONT) AND EAST ELEVATIONS

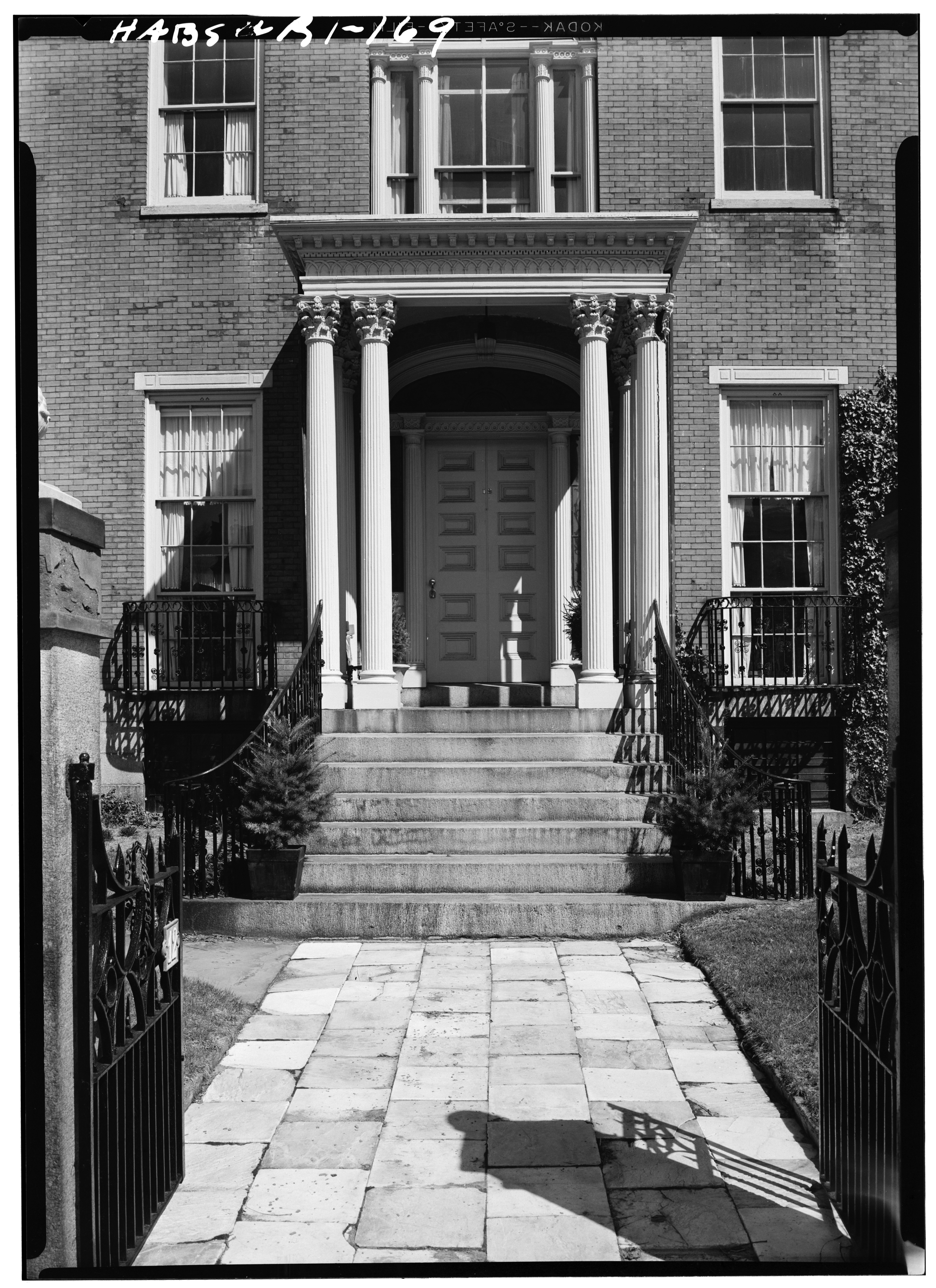
1958 MAIN ENTRANCE PORCH ON SOUTH (FRONT)

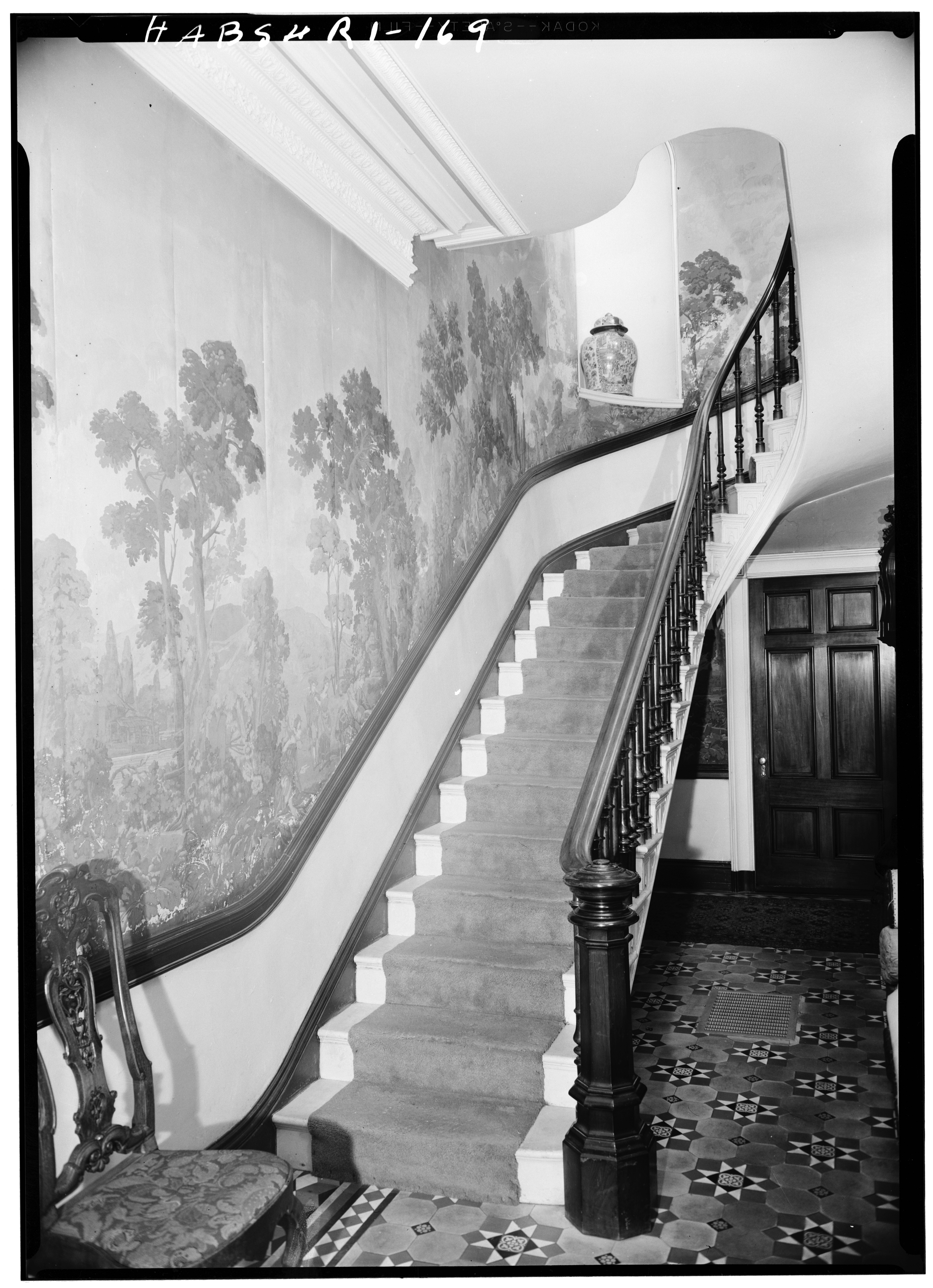
1958 MAIN STAIRWAY FROM FIRST FLOOR HALLWAY

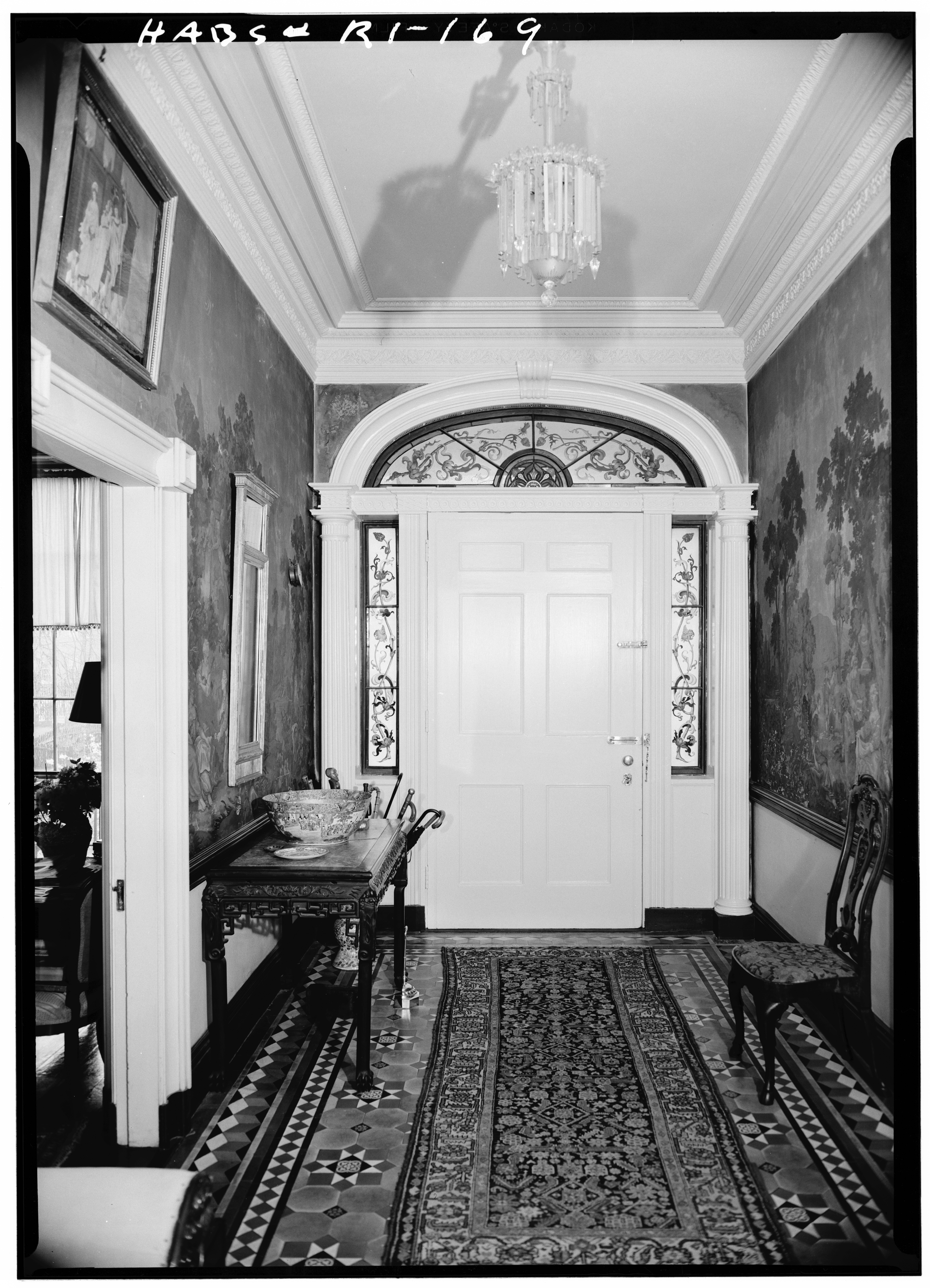
1958 ENTRANCE HALL SHOWING INSIDE OF MAIN DOORWAY

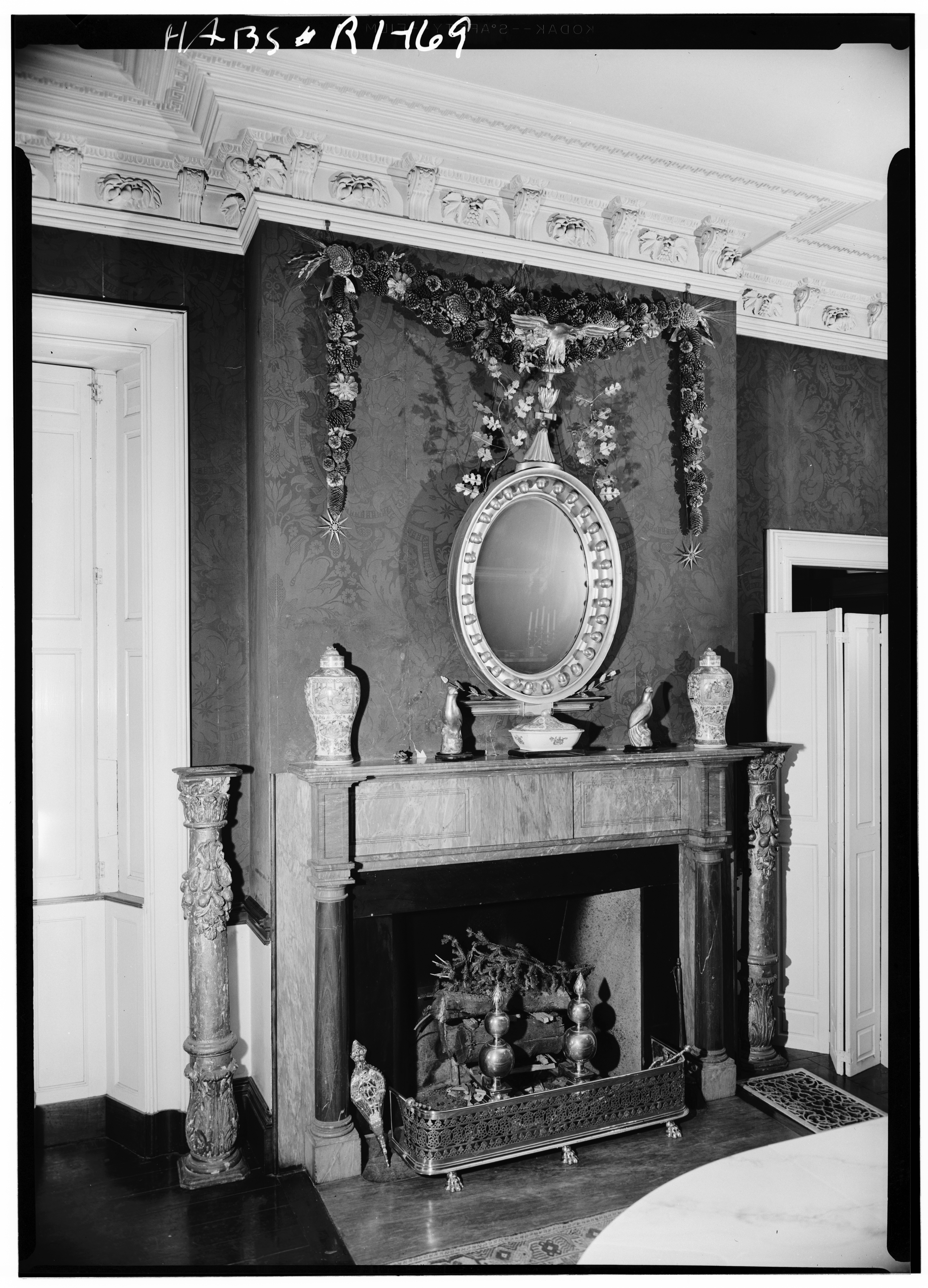
1958 FIREPLACE IN DINING ROOM

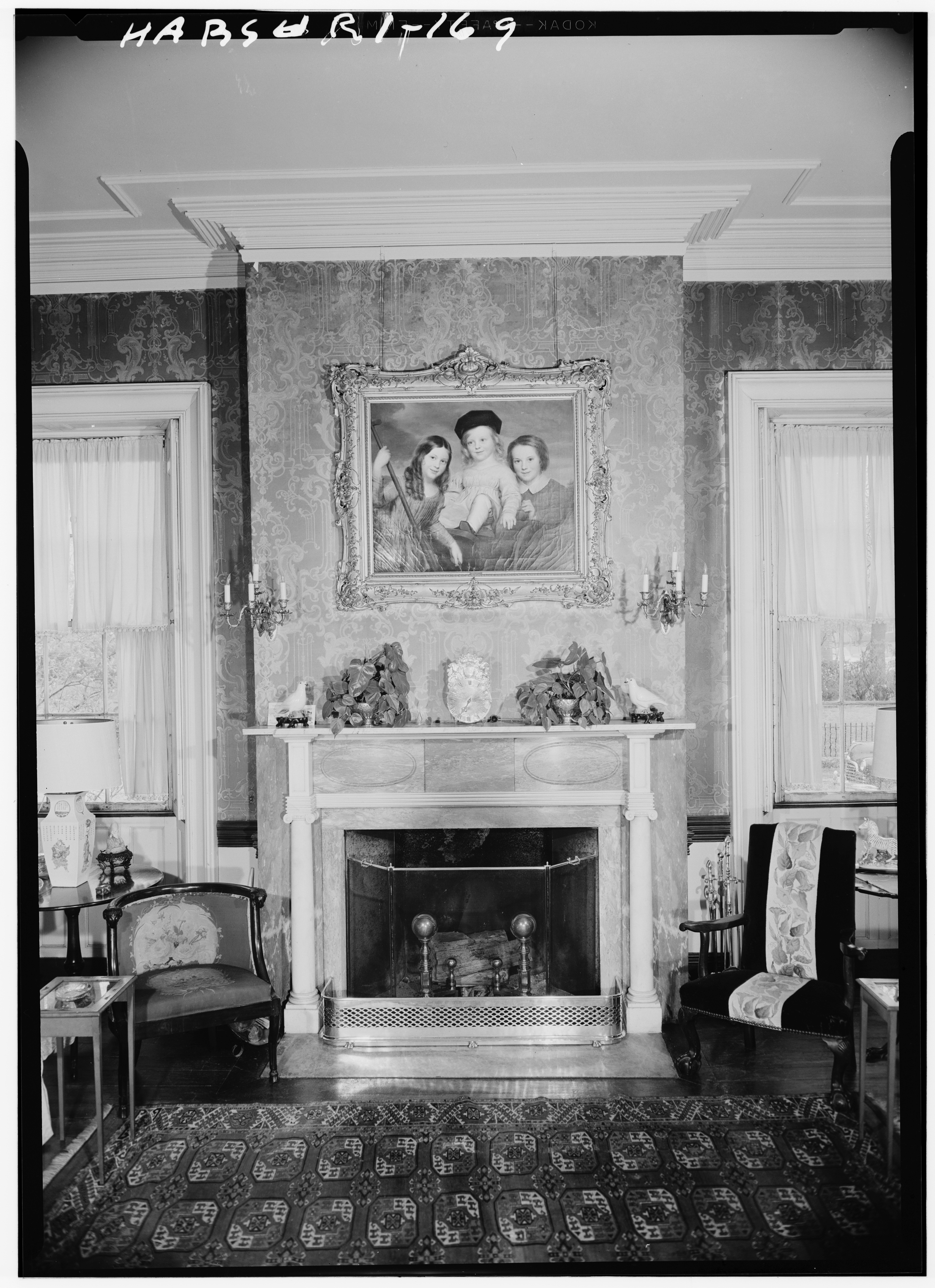
1958 FIREPLACE IN SOUTHEAST PARLOR

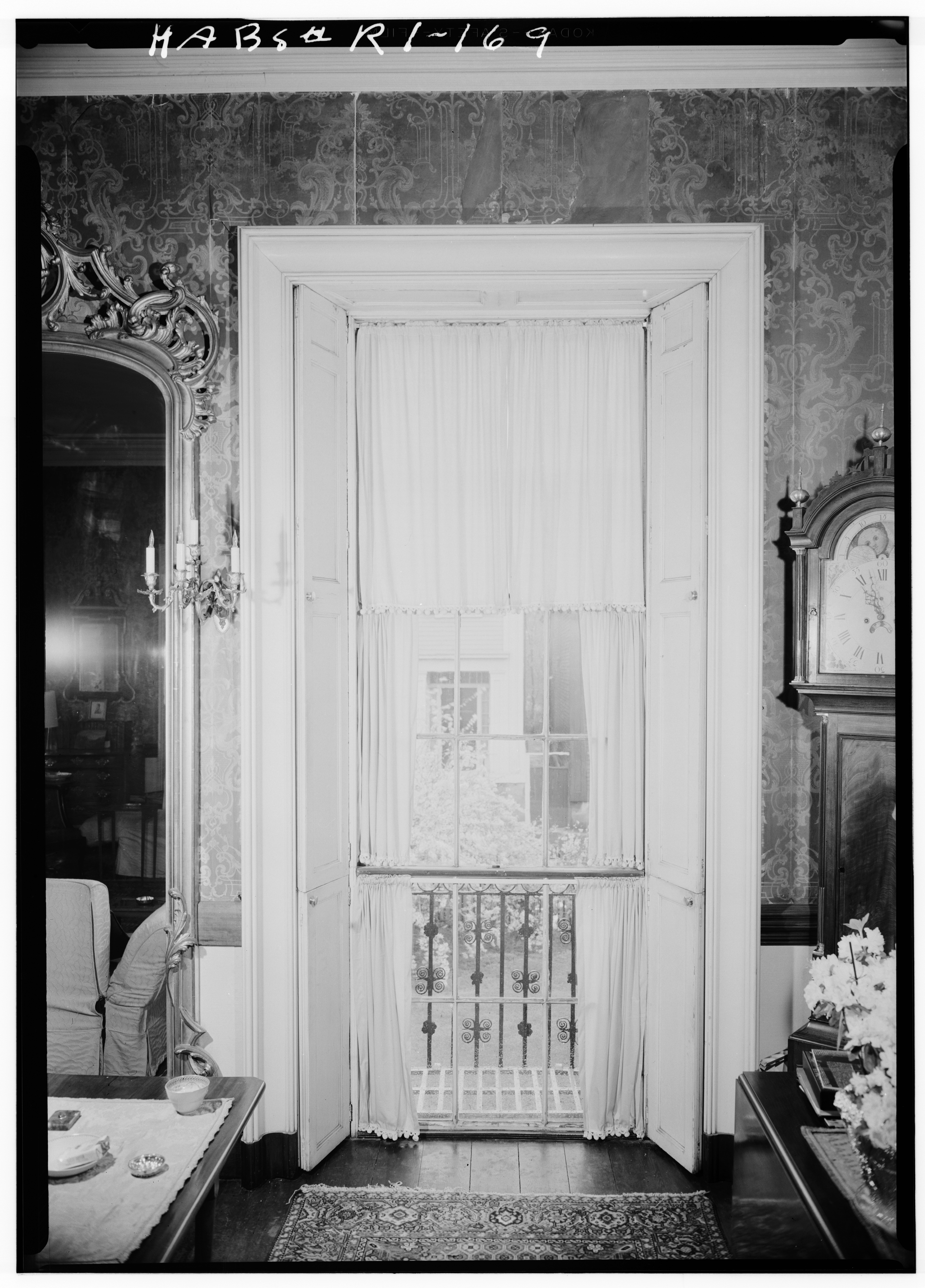
1958 WINDOW IN SOUTH WALL OF SOUTHEAST PARLOR

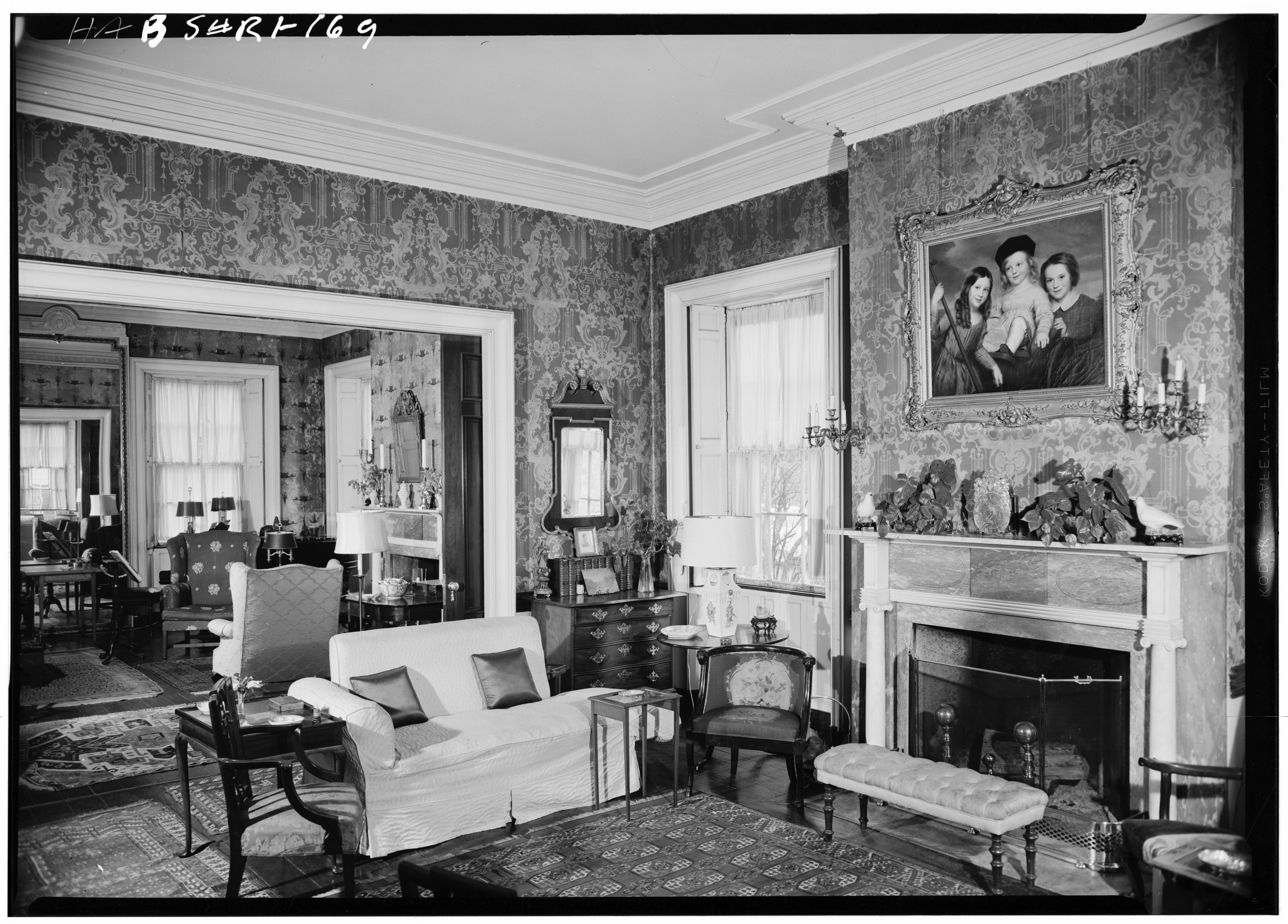
1958 SOUTHEAST PARLOR SHOWING NORTHEAST PARLOR BEYOND

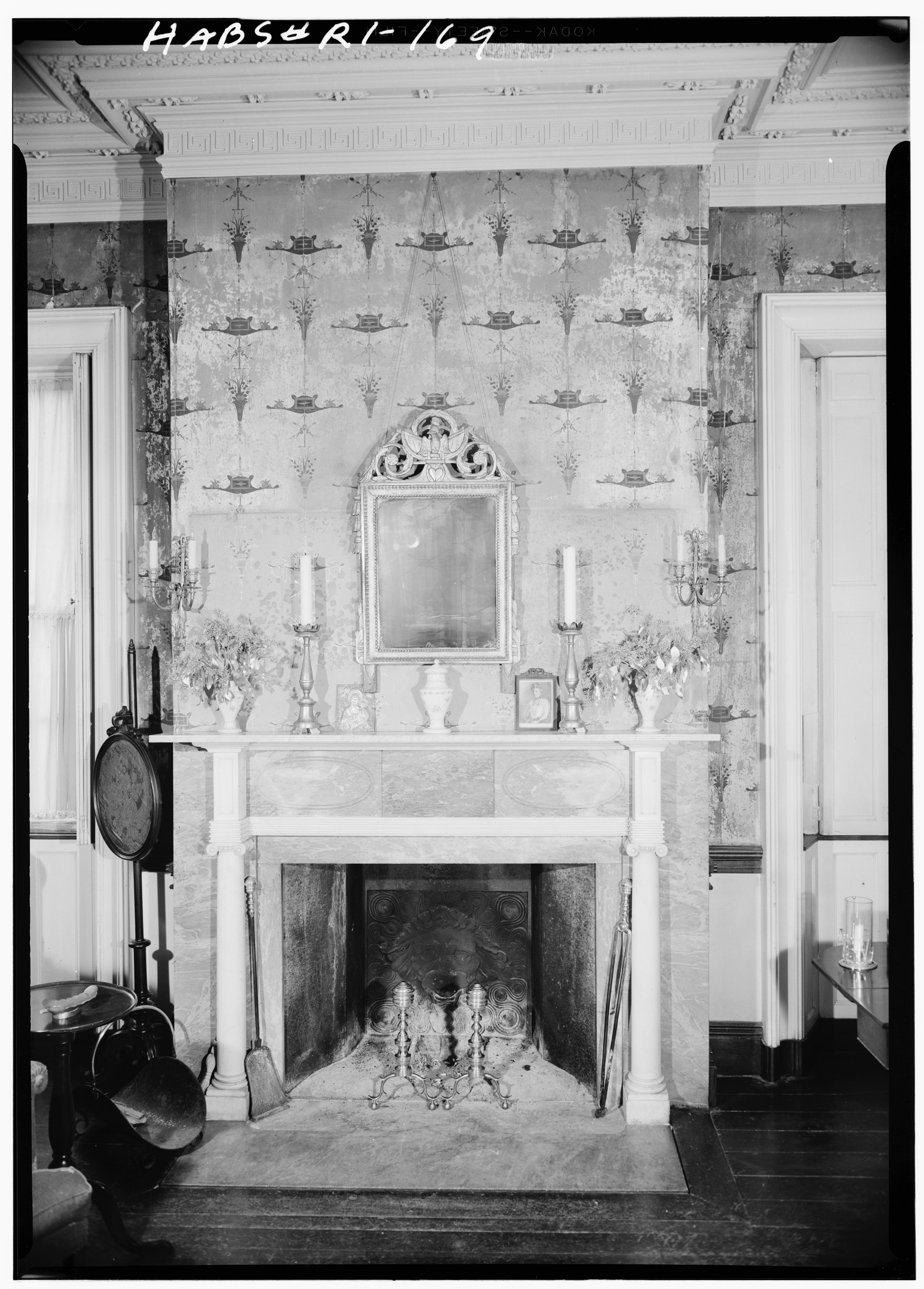
1958 FIREPLACE IN NORTHEAST PARLOR

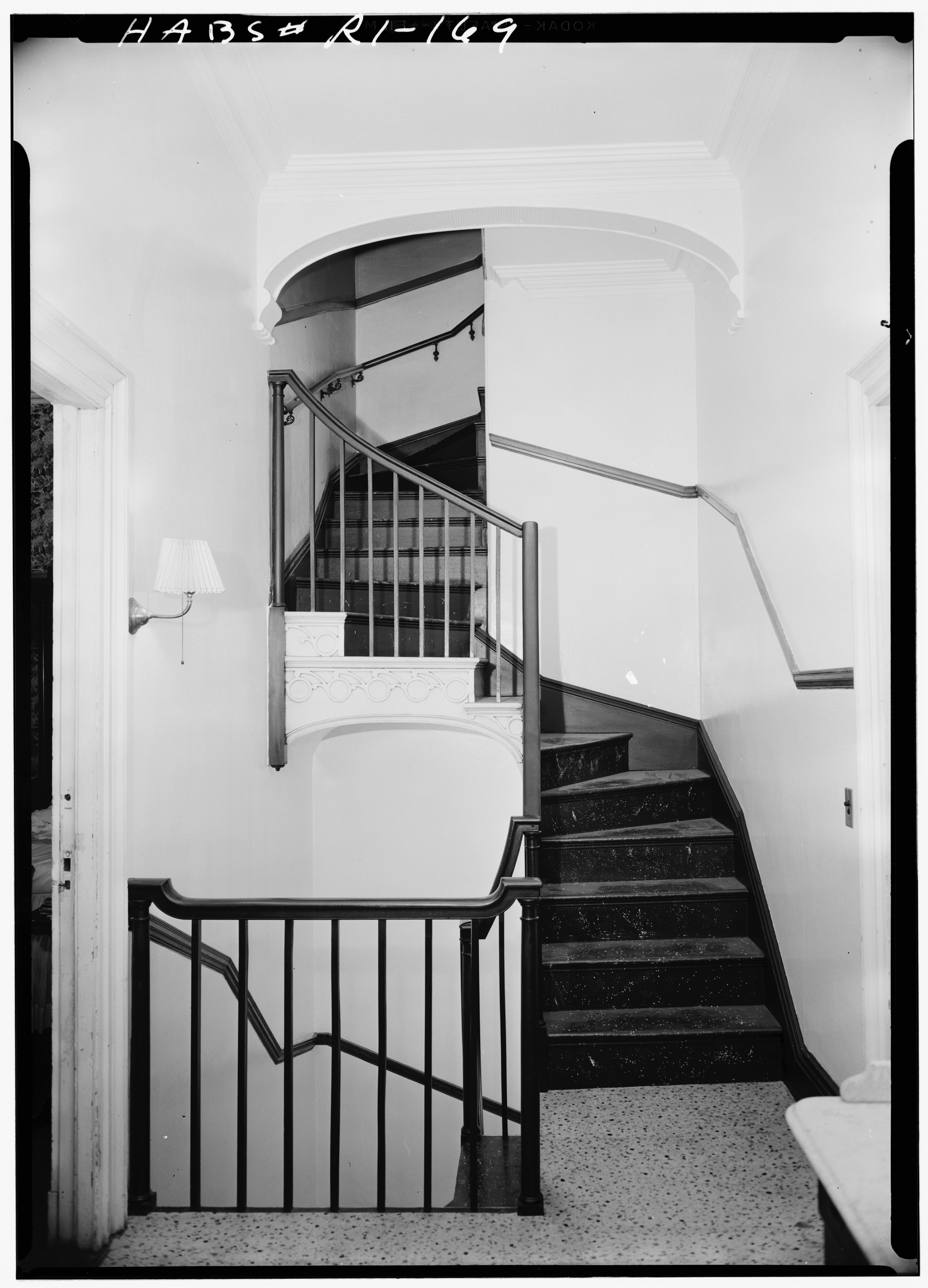
1958 BACK STAIRWAY

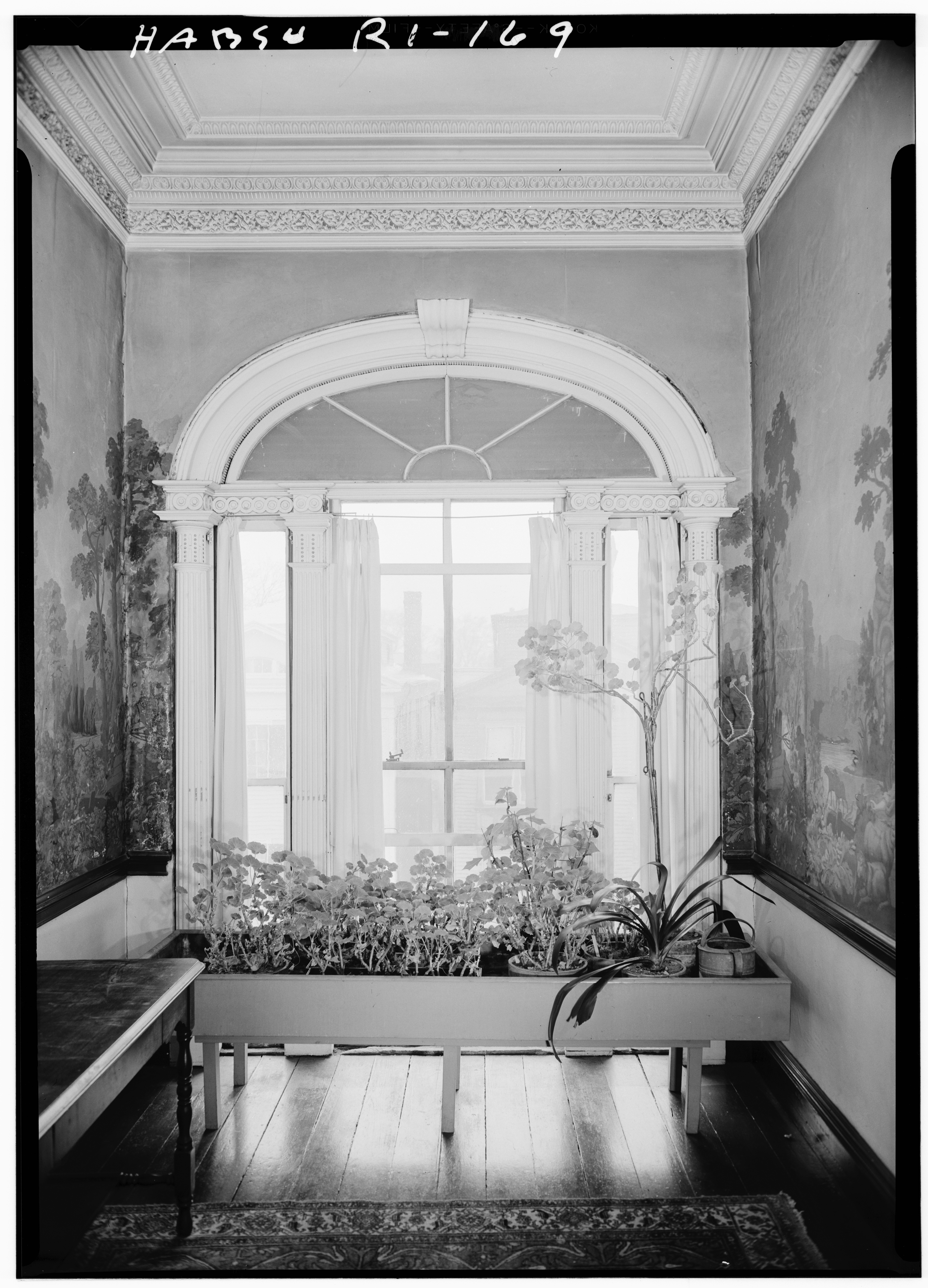
1958 SECOND FLOOR HALLWAY LOOKING TOWARD TRIPARTITE WINDOW OVER MAIN ENTRANCE

== See also ==
- National Register of Historic Places listings in Providence, Rhode Island
