= State Arsenal =

State Arsenal may refer to:

- State Arsenal (Lincoln, Nebraska), listed on the National Register of Historic Places in Lancaster County, Nebraska
- State Arsenal (Providence, Rhode Island), listed on the National Register of Historic Places in Providence County, Rhode Island
