= James C. Bucklin =

American architect

James Champlin Bucklin
- Born: July 26, 1801; Pawtucket, Rhode Island
- Died: September 28, 1890 (aged 89); Providence, Rhode Island
- Occupation: Architect

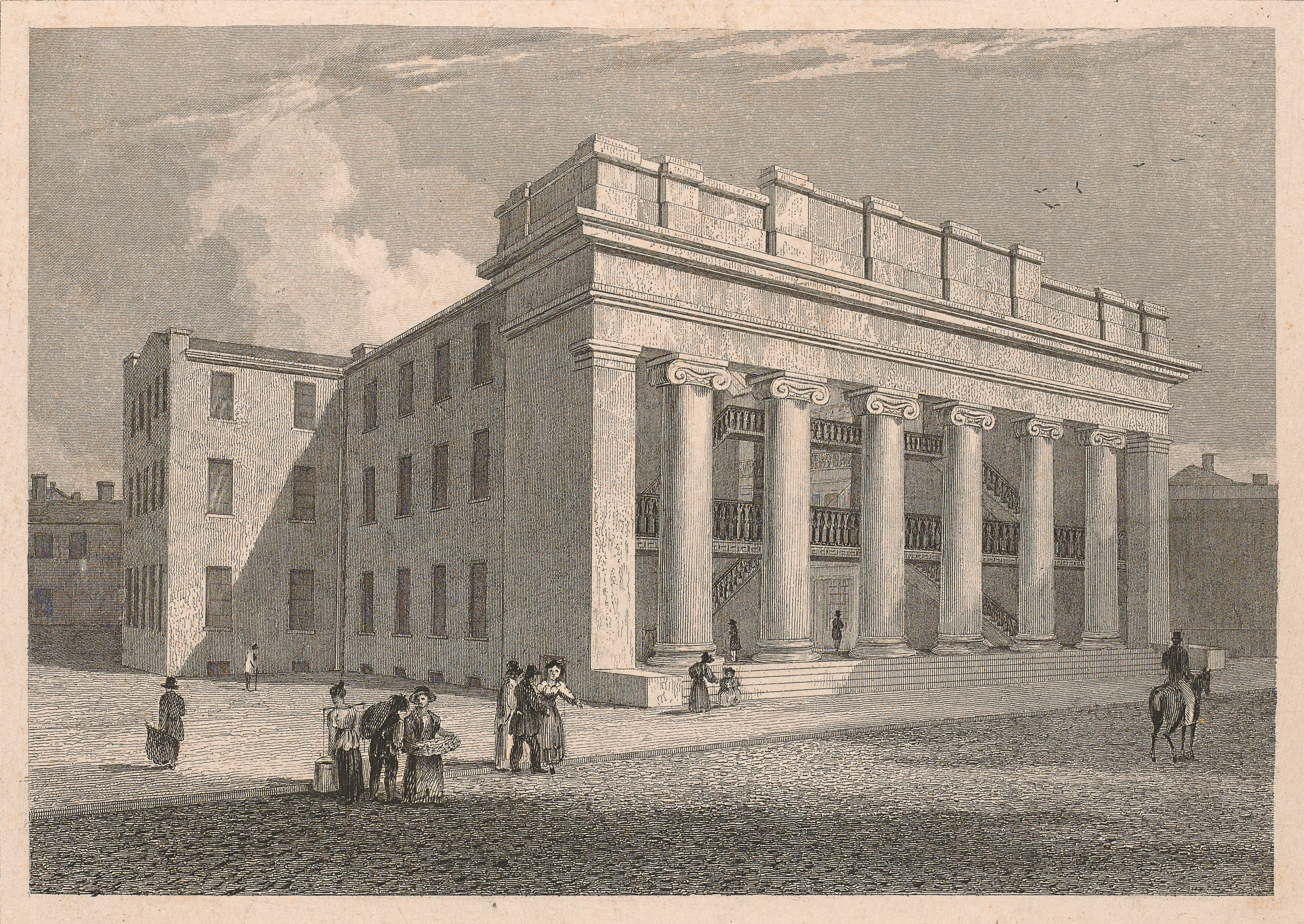
An 1836 view of the Weybosset Street facade of The Arcade, designed by Bucklin in association with Russell Warren in the Greek Revival style and completed in 1828.

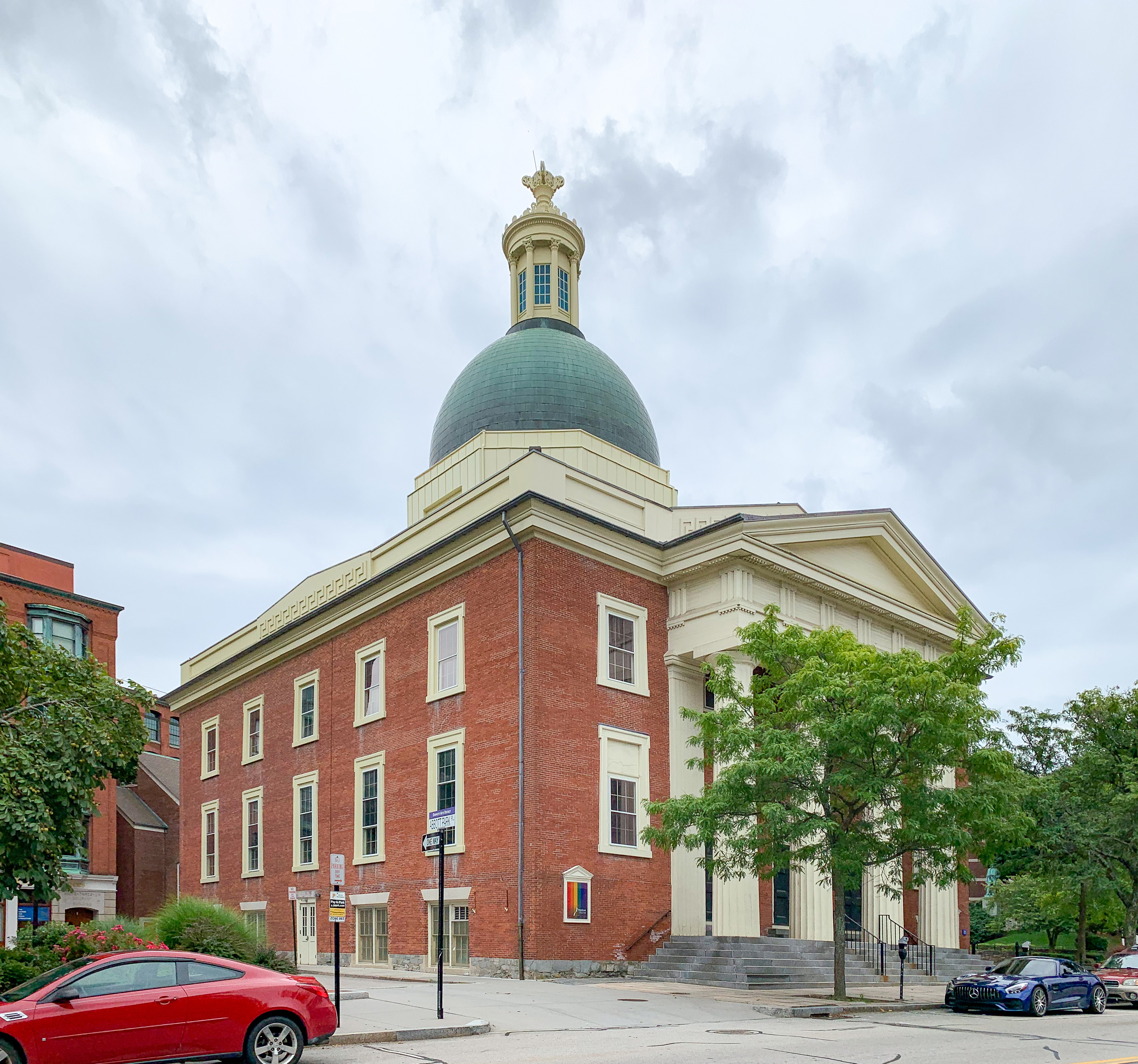
The Beneficent Congregational Church, rebuilt by Bucklin in the Greek Revival style in 1836.

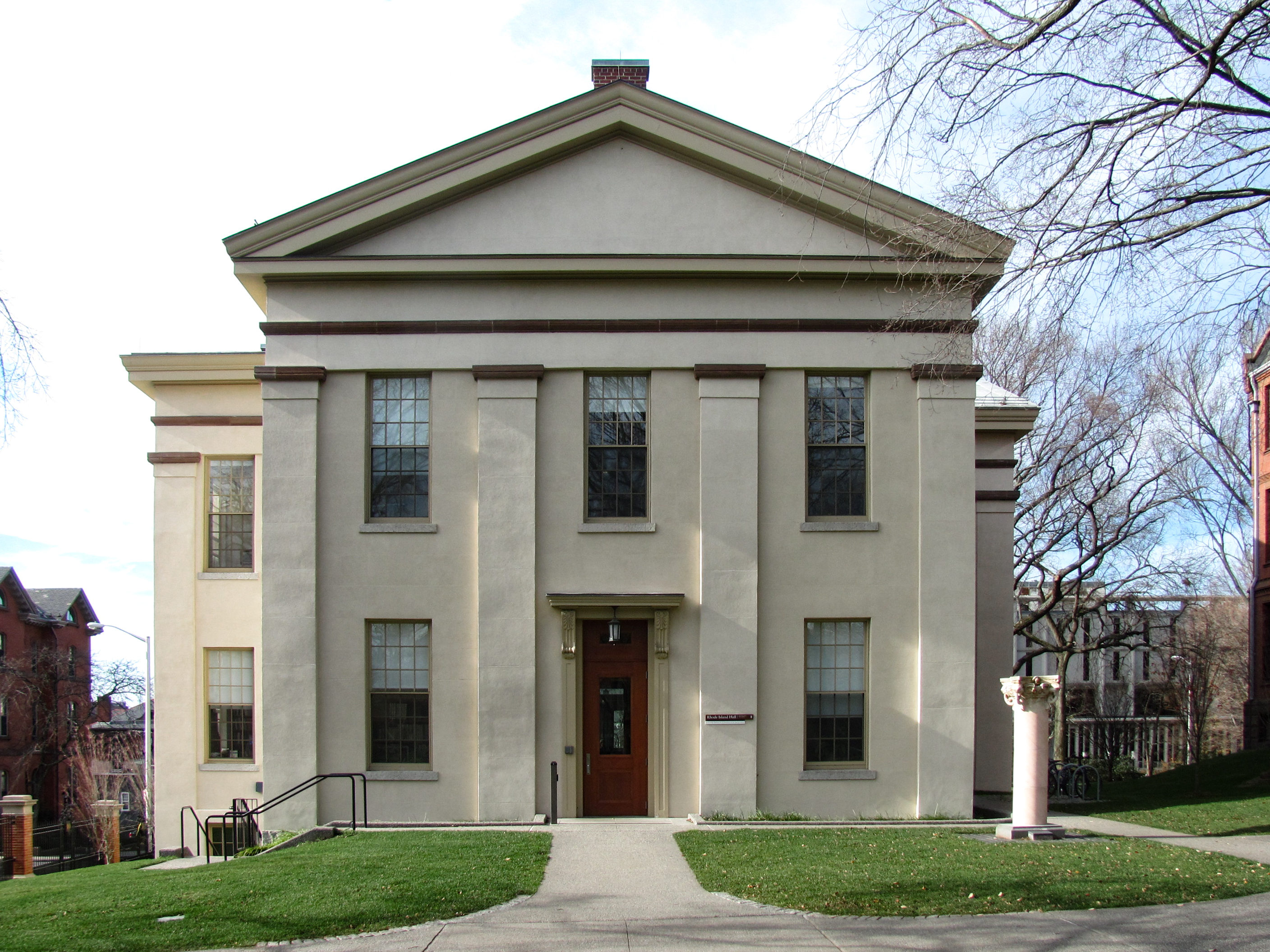
Rhode Island Hall of Brown University, designed by Bucklin in the Greek Revival style and completed in 1840.

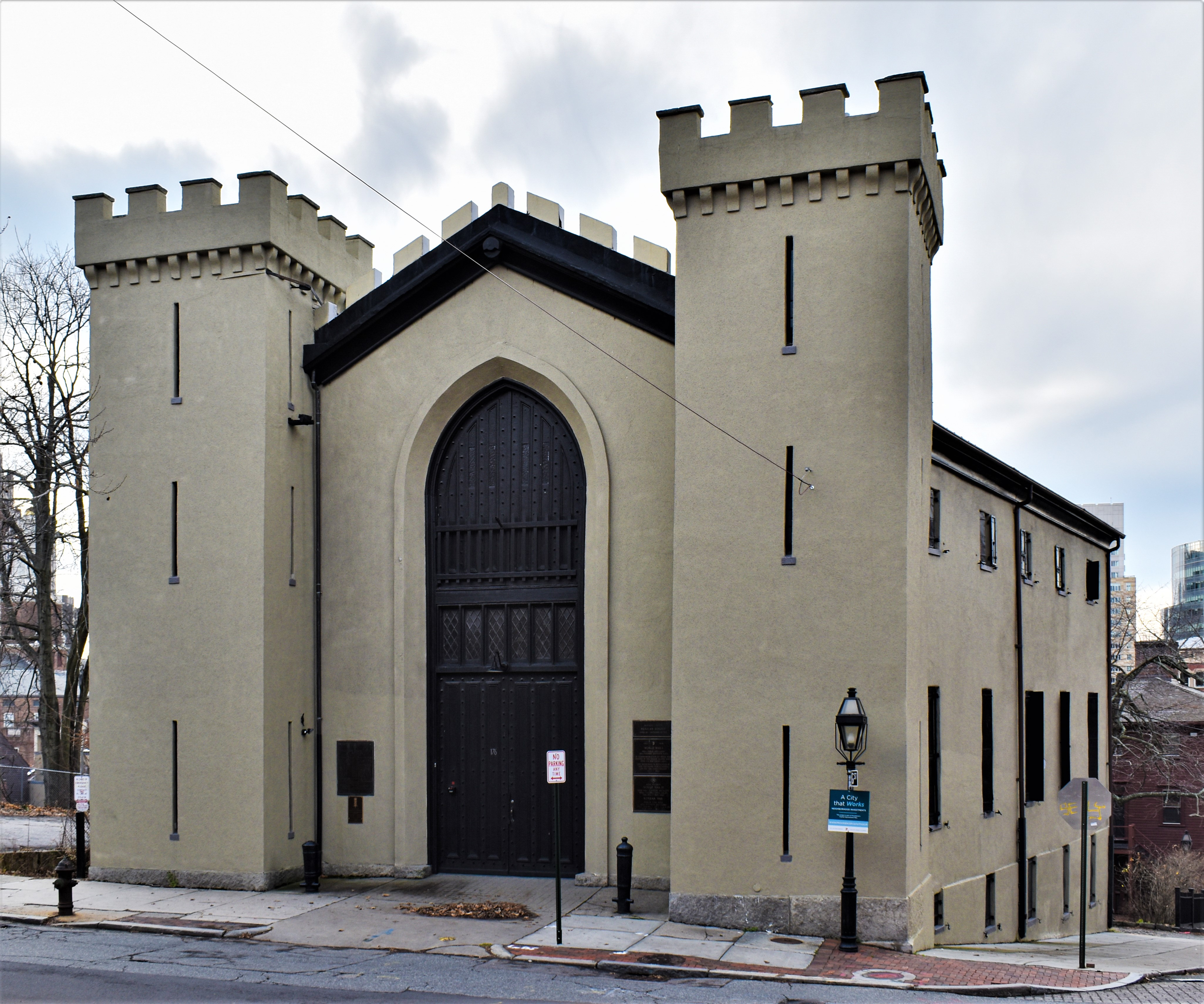
The former Benefit Street Arsenal, designed by Bucklin in the Gothic Revival style and completed in 1843.

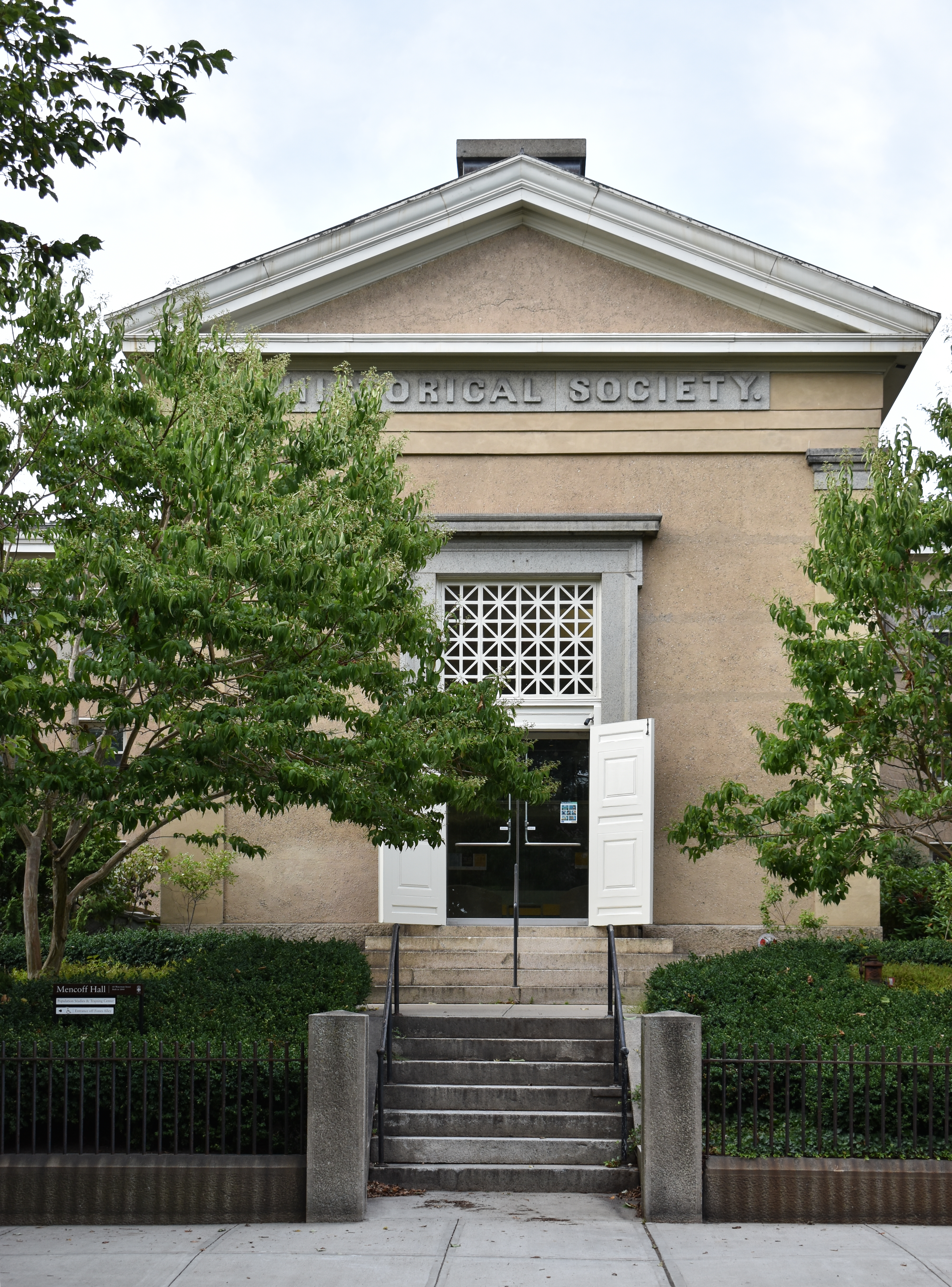
The former cabinet of the Rhode Island Historical Society, now Mencoff Hall of Brown University, designed by Bucklin in the Greek Revival style and completed in 1844.

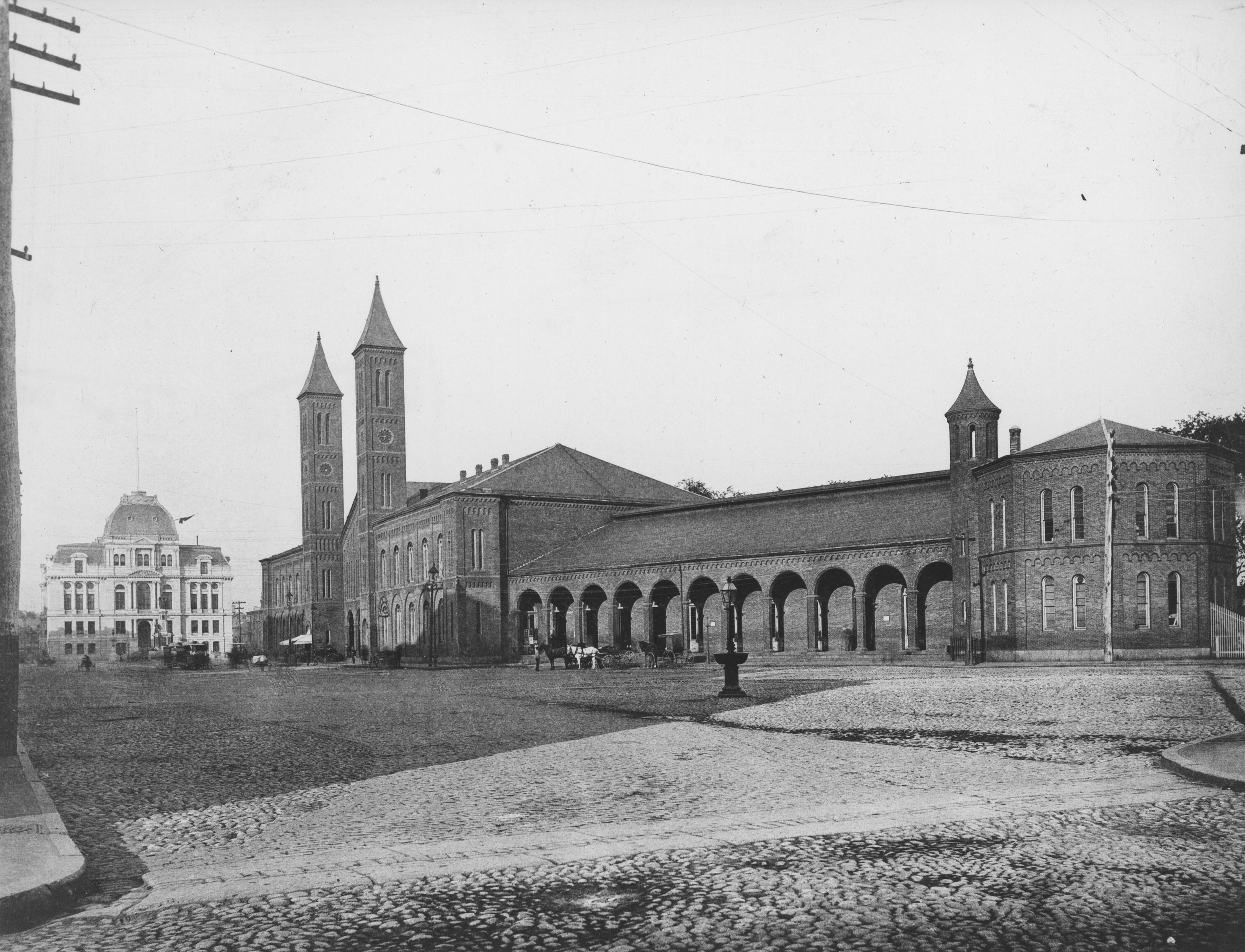
The original Union Station, designed by Thomas Alexander Tefft in the rundbogenstil and completed by Bucklin in 1848.

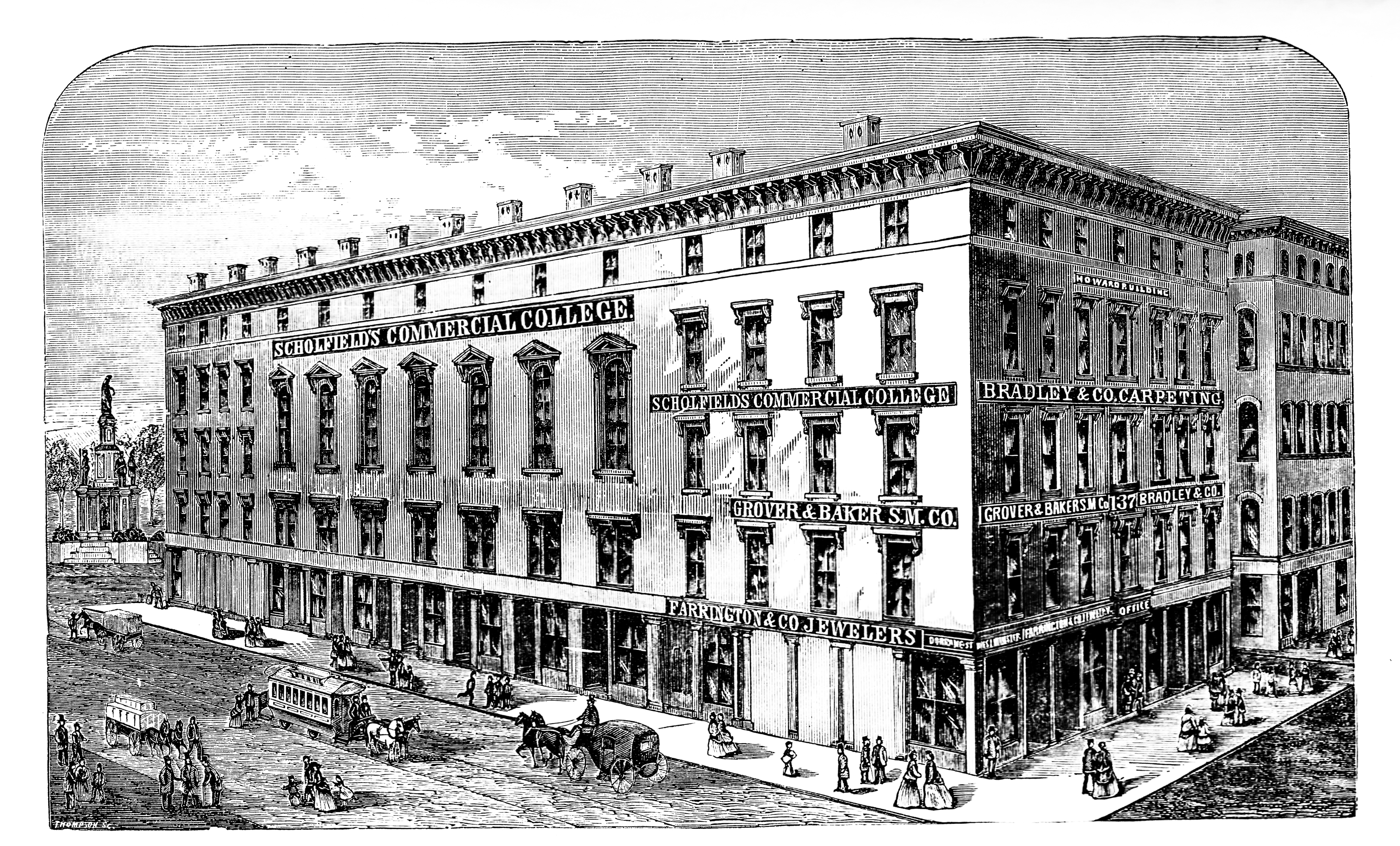
The third Howard Building, designed by Bucklin in the Italianate style and completed in 1859.

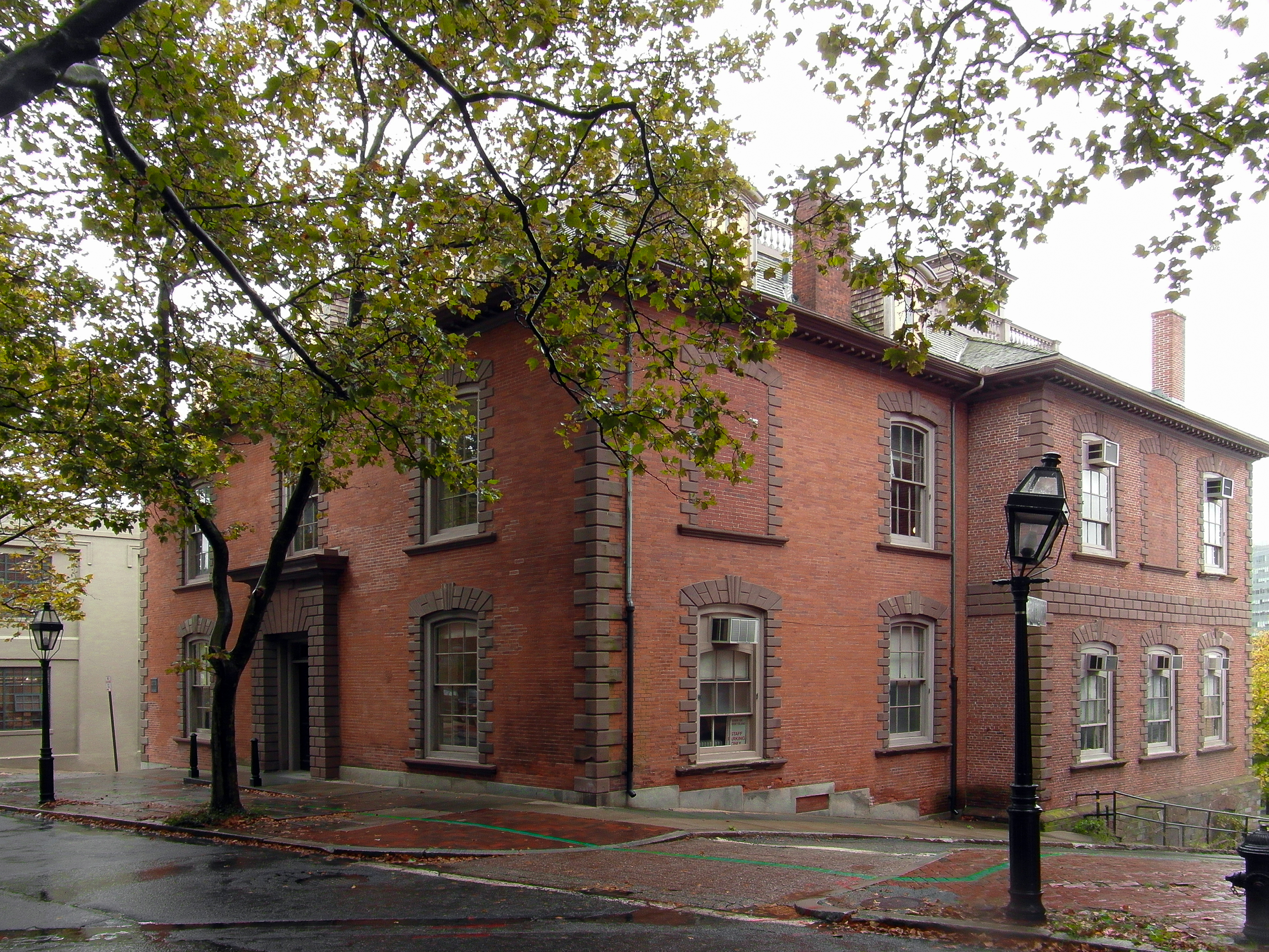
The addition to the Old State House, designed by Bucklin to match the main building and completed in 1867.

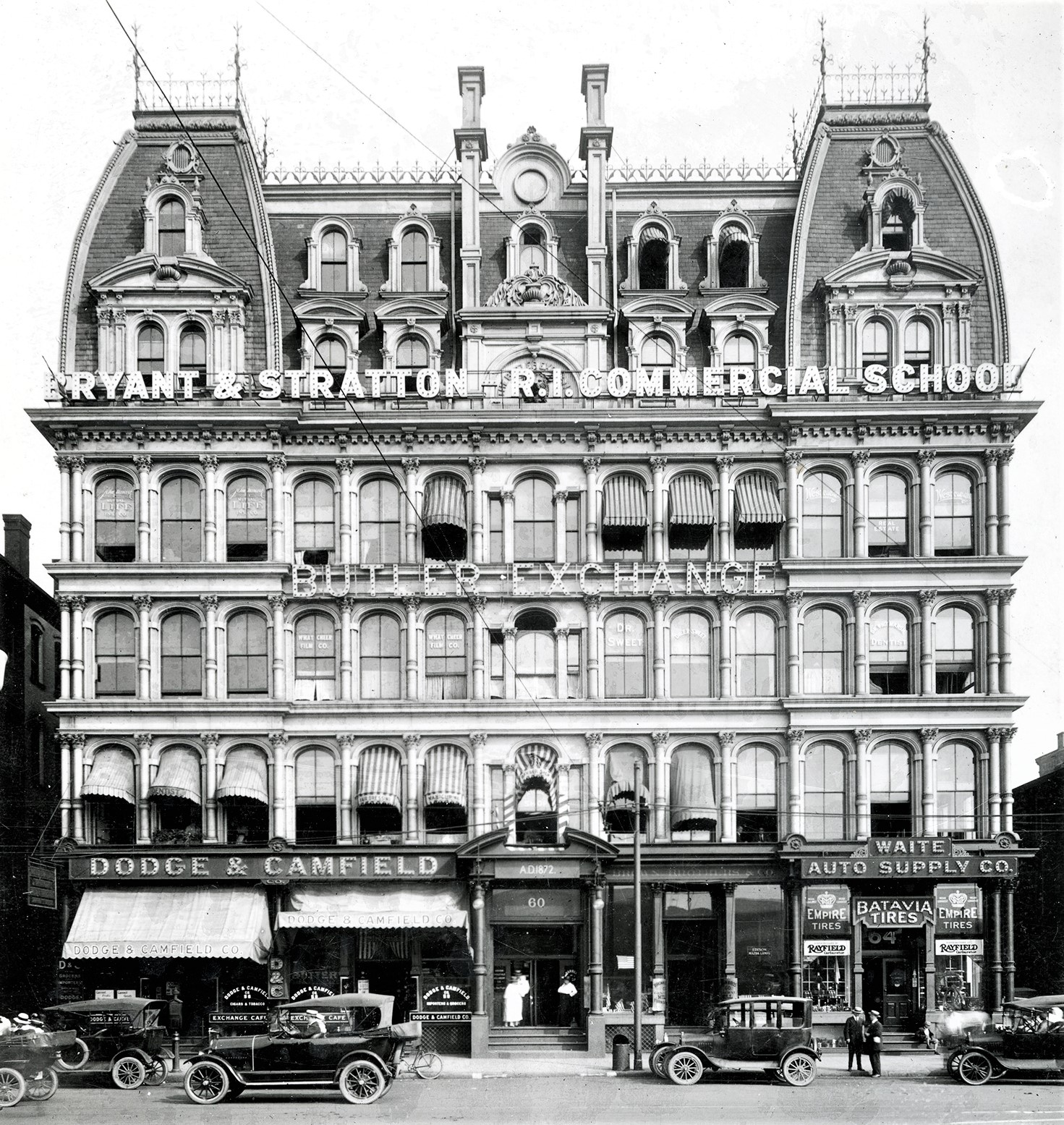
The Butler Exchange, designed by Arthur Gilman in the Second Empire style and completed by Bucklin in 1873.

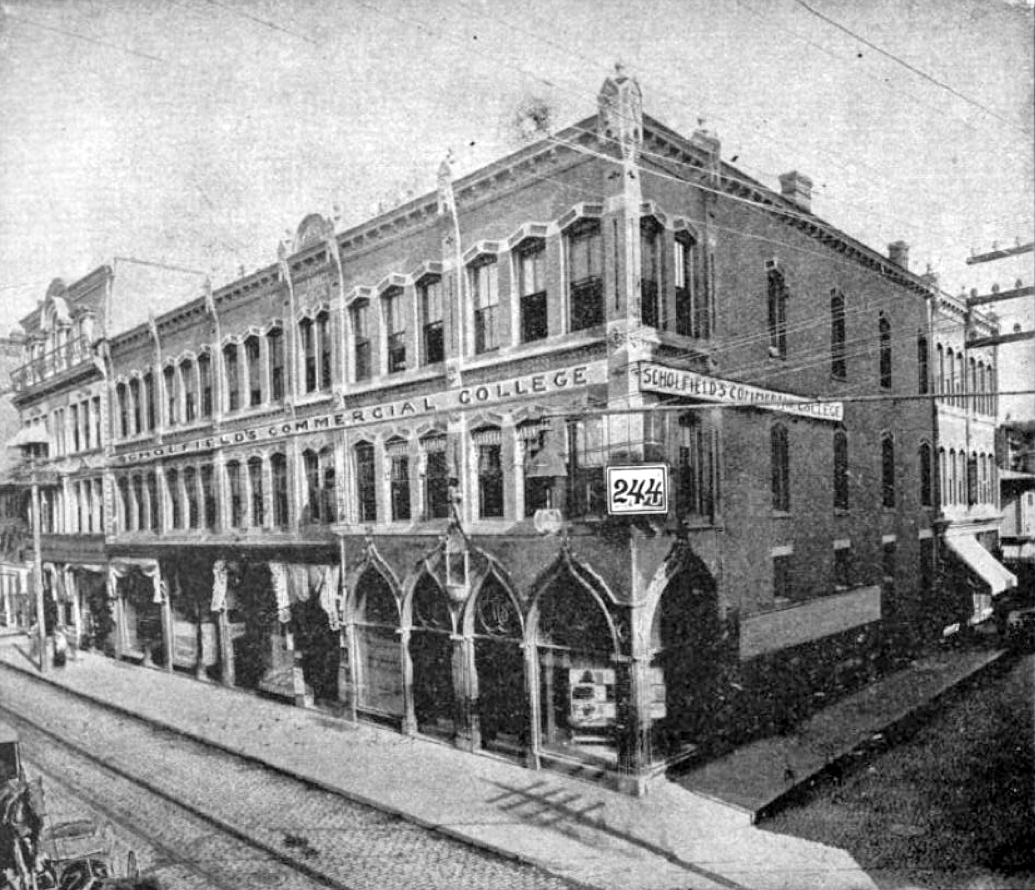
The Billings Block, designed by mill architect Robert Manchester, with the assistance of Bucklin and his son, in the High Victorian Gothic style and completed in 1880.

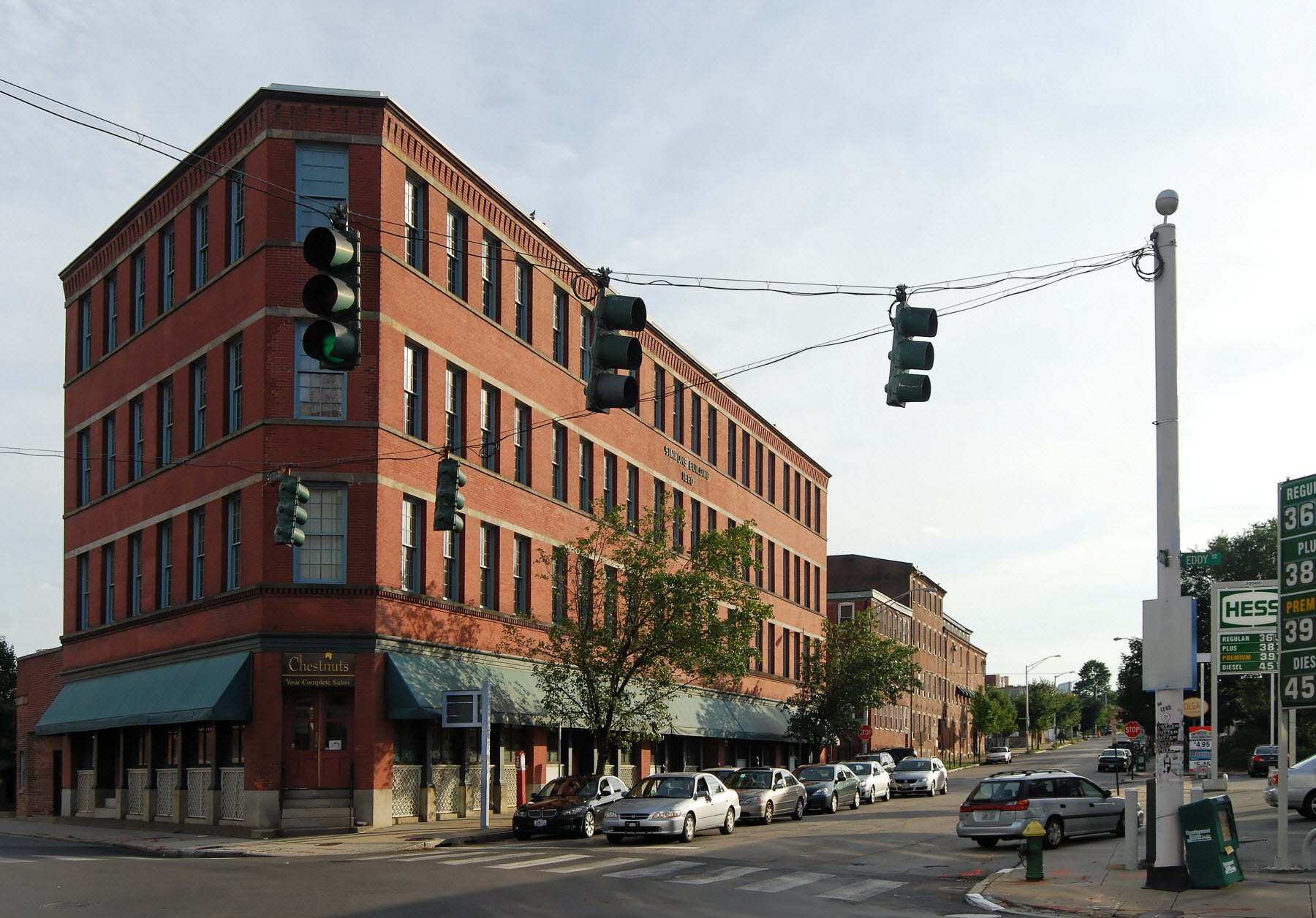
The Simmons Building in Davol Square, designed by Bucklin and his son and completed in 1880.

James C. Bucklin (July 26, 1801 – September 28, 1890) was an American architect and builder in practice in Providence, Rhode Island, from 1822 until his death in 1890. A key figure in Rhode Island architecture, Bucklin is best remembered as a co-architect of The Arcade (1828), the first example of Greek Revival architecture in Rhode Island, as the designer of other major Greek Revival buildings and as the mentor of Thomas Alexander Tefft.

== Life and career ==
=== Early life and education ===
James Champlin Bucklin was born July 26, 1801, in a part of Rehoboth, Massachusetts, that is now part of Pawtucket, Rhode Island, to James Bucklin and Loraine Bucklin, née Pearce. When James Bucklin died in an accident in 1802, his widow and son moved to Providence, where they joined the household of Earl D. Pearce, Loraine Bucklin's brother. He was educated in the Providence public schools and at the age of 14 was apprenticed to John Holden Greene, an architect and builder. Bucklin's apprenticeship with Greene coincided with two of Greene's most important commissions, the First Unitarian Church (1816) in Providence and the Independent Presbyterian Church (1819) in Savannah, Georgia; he worked on the construction of both. Greene primarily trained his apprentices in carpentry and building; those looking for architectural training, like Bucklin, had to pursue independent study.

=== Early career ===
At the age of 21 Bucklin completed his apprenticeship and left Greene to begin business for himself, forming the partnership of Tallman & Bucklin with William Tallman, another builder. Tallman & Bucklin were primarily contractors, though Bucklin, self-educated in architecture, designed many of the buildings the firm built. The first new work with which he is associated is The Arcade (1828), the first example of monumental Greek Revival architecture in Rhode Island. In 1826, on behalf of the owners of the proposed building, Bucklin traveled to New York City and Philadelphia to make sketches of their existing arcades, both designed by John Haviland, and prepared an initial design. In 1827 Russell Warren, a Bristol architect and builder recently returned from South Carolina, was appointed chief architect of the project. Largely due to his adoption of the professional title "Architect," Warren has usually been given full credit for the design. However, the records of the project indicate that the design was originally Bucklin's, refined by Bucklin and Warren collaboratively. Their design for a two-story building was accepted in May 1827 but in June 1828, with construction far progressed, the owners chose to add a third story of shops and adopted Warren's proposal to substitute Bucklin's panelled parapet with a triangular pediment on the Westminster Street facade. Bucklin's parapet was built as designed on the Weybosset Street facade and the two are otherwise identical.

With this work underway, Bucklin introduced the Greek Revival style to Providence residential architecture with a wooden double house for his uncle Earl D. Pearce (1827) on Benefit Street at the foot of Jenckes Street and a more monumental brick house a block to the south for Enoch White Clark (1828), the Providence representative of a large Philadelphia bank.

=== Practice with Warren and Tefft ===
From about 1829 to 1833 Warren was Bucklin's business partner, the firm being known as Warren, Tallman & Bucklin. Under that name they completed the now-demolished Chatham County Courthouse (1833) in Savannah, Georgia. The courthouse, only a block from Greene's Independent Presbyterian Church, is considered to have been one of the best examples of Greek Revival architecture in Georgia. Tallman & Bucklin were also the builders of Warren's Westminster Congregational Church (1829) and Manning Hall (1835) of Brown University. As a member of the Westminster congregation, Bucklin is known to have contributed to the design of its church; it is unclear what, if any, design role he may have had in Manning Hall. Over the next decade Bucklin completed a series of notable projects, mostly in the Greek Revival style: the Beneficent Congregational Church (1836), Shakespeare Hall (1838), Rhode Island Hall (1840) of Brown University, the Benefit Street Arsenal (1843), the Providence High School (1843), the Washington Buildings (1843), the former cabinet of the Rhode Island Historical Society (1844) and Center House (1847) of Butler Hospital.

In 1845, on the advice of state education commissioner Henry Barnard, the firm took on Richmond schoolteacher Thomas Alexander Tefft as an apprentice. They would have been well-known to Barnard, having been the architects and builders of Providence's recent school construction campaign. Tefft's talent for design quickly became apparent and he supplanted Bucklin as the firm's primary designer. He was the principal designer of the original Union Station (1848), which was the first large railroad station and the first civic application of the rundbogenstil in the United States. Bucklin served as the project's superintendent and never claimed credit for the design.

=== Independent practice ===
In September 1850 Tallman & Bucklin's planing mill was destroyed by fire, representing a severe financial loss to the partners; they dissolved their partnership the following March. It was only at this point that Bucklin began to refer to himself as an "Architect," a change that probably came about due to the influence of Tefft, who he considered a surrogate son. After his graduation from Brown University in July 1851, Tefft left to open his own office. For the next few years Bucklin's former mentorship of Tefft seems to have reversed, with Tefft now introducing Bucklin to new architectural ideas. When Tefft left the country in 1856 he granted Bucklin power of attorney, and at his death in 1859 he left him his books and drawings. Bucklin's later projects included the third Howard Building (1859), the Hay Buildings (1867), the addition to the Old State House (1867) and the Hoppin Homestead Building (1875). Few projects after that point are known.

By the 1880s Bucklin's health was in decline. His most loyal client up to this point had been the estate of Cyrus Butler, co-owner of the Arcade and benefactor of Butler Hospital. For Alexander Duncan, Butler's son-in-law and executor, he designed and superintended new buildings and was superintendent of the Duncan, Sherman & Company bank (1856, Alexander Saeltzer) in New York City and the Butler Exchange (1873, Arthur Gilman) in Providence. However, with Bucklin now largely incapacitated, they moved on to other architects. Since circa 1862, Bucklin had been associated with his son, architect James A. Bucklin, who now largely took over their shared practice. Despite his poor health he continued to work, and at his death was noted as "one of the oldest practicing architects in the country," and was definitely the oldest in Rhode Island.

== Personal life ==
Bucklin was married in 1829 to Lucy Dailey of Providence. They had five children, including four sons and one daughter. In 1831 he built a home for his family at 158 Clifford Street in what is now the Jewelry District; he and his wife lived there for the rest of their lives. This house was demolished about 1908 and replaced by the Wall Building (1910, Monks & Johnson), itself notable as the first Rhode Island application of the mushroom column structural system devised by engineer C.A.P. Turner.

Bucklin was a member of the Squantum Association, the Providence Athenaeum and the First Light Infantry and was a congregant of the Westminster Congregational Church. He was well known as a reader and collector of architectural books, many of them rare, and was otherwise considered "a great reader of good books." He was a member of the Providence Common Council from the fifth ward for the years 1839-41 and 1842-43.

Bucklin died September 28, 1890, in Providence at the age of 89.

== Legacy ==
In his Rhode Island Architecture, architectural historian Henry-Russell Hitchcock identifies Bucklin as a key figure in the history of Rhode Island architecture, having succeeded his former master, John Holden Greene, as the state's leading architect, having reoriented the older Federalist Russell Warren towards the Greek Revival and having launched the career of Thomas Alexander Tefft. He sums up Bucklin's oeuvre as "solidly put together, quietly designed, and distinguished by a dignity and sobriety which is as rare in the immediately preceding period as in that which was to follow" and singles out his now-demolished Washington Buildings (1843) for praise as "an unusually large and splendid example of Greek Revival commercial building." Talbot Hamlin described the same building as "urbane yet reticent...it gave promise of a development of urban character and harmony, and of cities that should be architectural throughout instead of merely in spots." Local architectural historian William McKenzie Woodward found that even in his later, more eclectic work, he never lost the restraint he had earlier exhibited.

Bucklin was instrumental in preserving Tefft's architectural drawings. At an unknown date these were left to William R. Walker, whose relationship with Bucklin or Tefft is unknown, and in 1951 Jessie Margaret Walker, widow of Walker's grandson, donated them to Brown University, where they remain.

Several of his buildings have been individually listed on the United States National Register of Historic Places; The Arcade has been additionally designated a National Historic Landmark.

== Works ==
- Earl Pearce Duplex, 42-44 Benefit St., Providence, RI (1827)
- Enoch W. Clarke House, 66 Benefit St., Providence, RI (1828)
- Westminster Arcade, 65 Weybosset St., Providence, RI (1828) - With Russell Warren.

For buildings built 1830-31, see Russell Warren.

- Remodeling of Providence City Building, 4 N. Main St., Providence, RI (1833) - Served as City Hall until 1878.
- Remodeling of Beneficent Congregational Church, 300 Weybosset St., Providence, RI (1836) - Built in 1809.
- Shakespeare Hall, 128 Dorrance St., Providence, RI (1838) - Closed in 1844, renovated into a warehouse in 1854.
- Arnold Street School, 41 Arnold St., Providence, RI (1839–40) - Demolished.
- Benefit Street School, 21 Benefit St., Providence, RI (1839–40) - Demolished.
- Elm Street School, Elm St. at Parsonage, Providence, RI (1839–40) - Demolished.
- Fountain Street School, 157 Fountain St., Providence, RI (1839–40) - Demolished.
- Knight Street School, 347 Knight St., Providence, RI (1839–40) - Demolished.
- Summer Street School, Summer & Pond Sts., Providence, RI (1839–40) - Demolished.
- President's Residence, 72 College St., Brown University, Providence, RI (1840) - Demolished 1908.
- Rhode Island Hall, Brown University, Providence, RI (1840)
- East Street School, 28 East St., Providence, RI (1841) - Demolished.
- Prospect Street School, 45 Prospect St., Providence, RI (1841) - Demolished. Site of the Corliss-Brackett House.
- Federal Street School, 97 Federal St., Providence, RI (1842) - Demolished.
- Washington Buildings, Memorial Blvd. & Westminster St., Providence, RI (1843) - Demolished. Now the site of the Hospital Trust Building.
- Providence High School, 205 Benefit St., Providence, RI (1844) - Later owned by the state. Demolished.
- Rhode Island Historical Society, 68 Waterman St., Providence, RI (1844) - Now Brown University's Mencoff Hall.
- Exchange Building, 30 Kennedy Plaza, Providence, RI (1845)

For buildings built 1846-51, see Thomas A. Tefft.

- Howard Building, 171 Westminster St., Providence, RI (1856) - Demolished.
- Blackstone Block, 27 Weybosset St., Providence, RI (1861) - Demolished 1979.
- Hiram Hill Duplex, 63-65 Charlesfield St., Providence, RI (1864)
- Union Railroad Co. Car Barn, 333 Bucklin St., Providence, RI (1865)
- Hay Buildings, 117-135 Dyer St., Providence, RI (1866)
- Monohasset Mill, 532 Kinsley Ave., Providence, RI (1866)
- Root Building, 180 Westminster St., Providence, RI (1866) - Burned 1890.
- Addition to Rhode Island State House, 150 Benefit St., Providence, RI (1867–68)
- Reynolds Building, 37 Weybosset St., Providence, RI (c.1867) - Demolished.
- Thomas Davis House, 830 Chalkstone Ave., Providence, RI (1869) - Demolished. The seat of a large estate, now Davis Park.
- Barstow Block, 386 Westminster St., Providence, RI (1871) - Also housed the Providence Music Hall. Demolished 1955.
- Hoppin Homestead Building, 283 Westminster St., Providence, RI (1875) - Demolished 1979.
- Brownell Building, 107 Westminster St., Providence, RI (1878) - Demolished 1925.
- Billings Block, 250 Westminster St., Providence, RI (1880) - Designed by Robert Manchester, mill architect and engineer, assisted by James C. and James A. Bucklin. Demolished in 1896.
- Simmons Building, 419 Eddy St., Providence, RI
- Amos C. Barstow House, 245 Morris Ave., Providence, RI (1886) - Designed by James A. Bucklin. Altered.
