= Shakespeare Hall =

- U.S. National Register of Historic Places
- U.S. Historic district – Contributing property
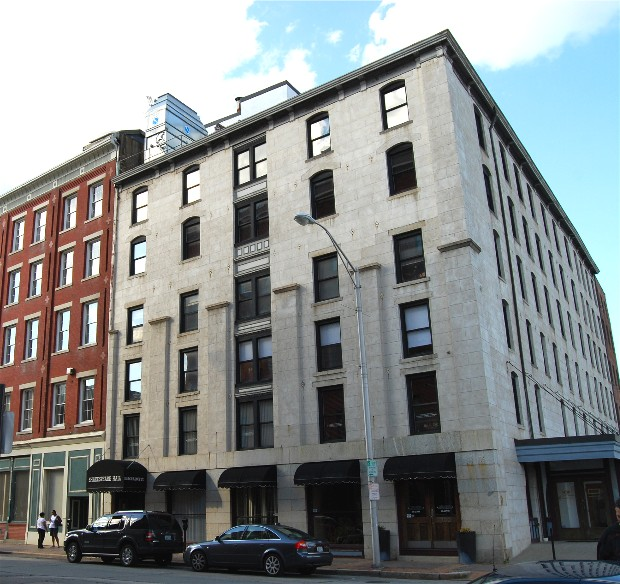

- Location within Rhode Island Location within the United States
- Location: Providence, Rhode Island
- Coordinates: 41°49′20″N 71°24′36″W
- Built: 1838
- Architect: Tallman & Bucklin
- Architectural style: Greek Revival
- Part of: Downtown Providence Historic District (ID84001967)
- NRHP reference No.: 79000002

Significant dates
- Added to NRHP: June 18, 1979
- Designated CP: February 10, 1984

Shakespeare Hall (also known as Ballou, Johnson & Nichols; Sprague—Knight Building) is an historic commercial building at 128 Dorrance Street in downtown Providence, Rhode Island. It is a six-story masonry structure, originally built as a three-story Greek Revival structure in 1838 to a design by Tallman & Bucklin. Its main facade has retained the massive granite pilasters and five-bay configuration from this period. Originally built to house a theater, the building suffered a massive fire in 1844, leaving only its exterior shell standing. It was afterward rebuilt to its present height, and a separate brick building at its rear was incorporated into its structure in the late 19th century. It was used as a warehouse in the 1860s, and has also housed light industrial operations. Today, the building is used largely for law office space.

The hall was listed on the National Register of Historic Places in 1979.

== See also ==
- National Register of Historic Places listings in Providence, Rhode Island
