= Westminster Arcade =

Shopping center in Providence, Rhode Island

- The Arcade
- U.S. National Register of Historic Places
- U.S. National Historic Landmark
- U.S. Historic district – Contributing property
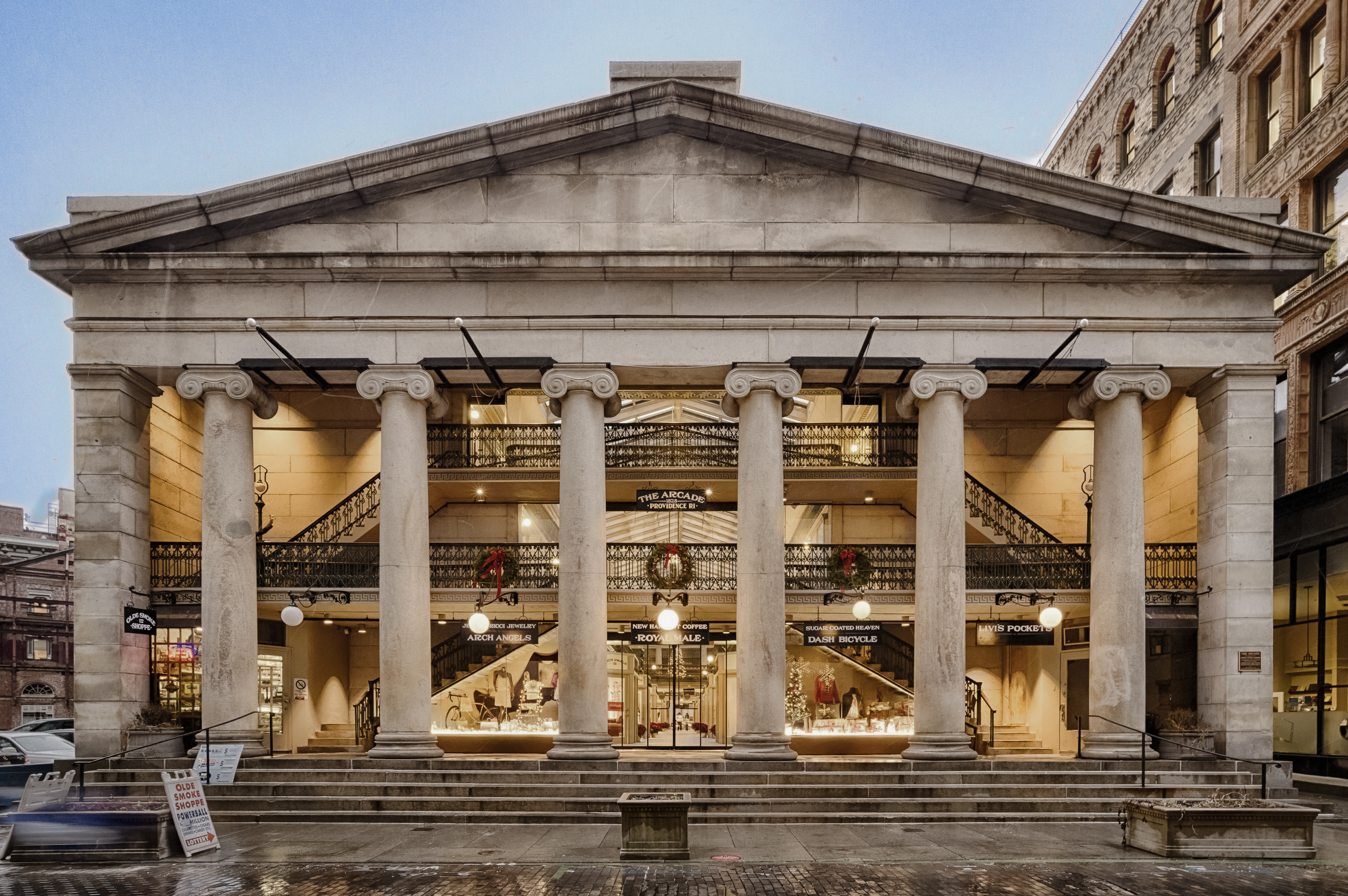

- Location within Rhode Island Location within the United States
- Interactive map showing the location of Westminster Arcade
- Location: 130 Westminster Street and 65 Weybosset Street, Providence, Rhode Island
- Coordinates: 41°49′26.238″N 71°24′38.048″W
- Built: 1828
- Architect: Russell Warren; Tallman & Bucklin
- Architectural style: Greek Revival
- Part of: Customhouse Historic District (ID75000058)
- NRHP reference No.: 71000029

Significant dates
- Added to NRHP: May 6, 1971
- Designated NHL: May 11, 1976
- Designated CP: February 20, 1975

The Westminster Arcade (also known as the Providence Arcade, Arcade Providence, or The Arcade) is a historic shopping center at 130 Westminster Street and 65 Weybosset Street in downtown Providence, Rhode Island erected in 1828. It is notable as the first enclosed shopping mall in the United States and has been lauded as a fine example of commercial Greek Revival architecture. It served as a shopping center for many years before falling into decline in the late 20th century. It has since been closed for renovation and rehabilitation several times, and most recently reopened its doors in October 2013 as a residential and commercial mixed-use building. It was declared a National Historic Landmark in 1976.

== History ==
The Arcade was developed as a commercial business venture by Cyrus Butler. Its preliminary design called for two floors of shops, and a third floor was added to the plans before construction began. The building was designed by Russell Warren and Tallman & Bucklin. Their design called for an arcaded lane of shops with skylights in the roof providing illumination, in emulation of similar structures then found in some European cities. Construction of the mall roughly followed the original plan, but some hasty alterations were made to meet the need for a vestibule and stairway on the Weybosset Street side of the building to provide access to the third floor. These were not well-constructed and required repairs in the 1940s.

At the time of the Arcade's opening, there were few retail stores on the west side of the Providence River. Most shopping was located on the east side or Cheapside district. The arcade was slow to attract customers and was known as "Butler's Folly" for many years because of its distance from the retail districts. This changed when a fashionable hat shop opened next door which attracted wealthy female customers to the neighborhood. After that, Westminster Street and downtown developed into a major shopping area.

In June 1843, President John Tyler toured New England while considering a potential third-party bid for re-election. One of Tyler's several Providence stops was at the Westminster Arcade, where he reportedly shook hands with 5,000 people.

The building served as a shopping center well into the 20th century. It fell into disrepair but was rehabilitated by architects Irving B. Haynes & Associates and Gilbane Properties, and it reopened in 1980. It closed again in 2008 for renovations. It reopened in October 2013 as a mixed-use commercial and residential "micro-loft" space under real estate developer Evan Granoff of Granoff Associates LLC working with Northeast Collaborative Architects.

The Arcade was listed on the National Register of Historic Places in 1971 and declared a National Historic Landmark in 1976.

== Description ==
The Arcade is a long, narrow building extending between Westminster and Weybosset Streets, north of Orange Street in downtown Providence. The two street-facing sides consist of Greek temple fronts, with six massive Ionic columns 45 feet (14 m) high. These massive columns were quarried eight miles (13 km) away in Johnston and hauled over dirt roads by teams of oxen. The columns on the Westminster Street side are topped by a triangular pediment; the Weybosset Street side has a block-and-panel railing above a simple entablature. Behind these fronts are open vestibule areas with stairs leading to the upper levels. The stairs leading to the third level are somewhat crowded beneath the roofline, particularly on the Weybosset Street side, where the vestibule was a late addition occasioned by the decision to add a third floor. The long sides of the building are relatively unadorned, as it was expected by the architects that structures would eventually be built abutting them.

The interior consists of a main avenue 13 feet (4.0 m) on the ground floor, above which the second and third floor lanes are protected by richly decorated cast iron railings capped in mahogany. The skylit roof extends the length of the building, its ridgeline aligned at the Westminster end with the top of the triangular pediment. Emphasis in all of the building's construction was on the use of fireproof materials; granite, brick, and cast iron are all used, and the roof was made of tin.

== Images ==
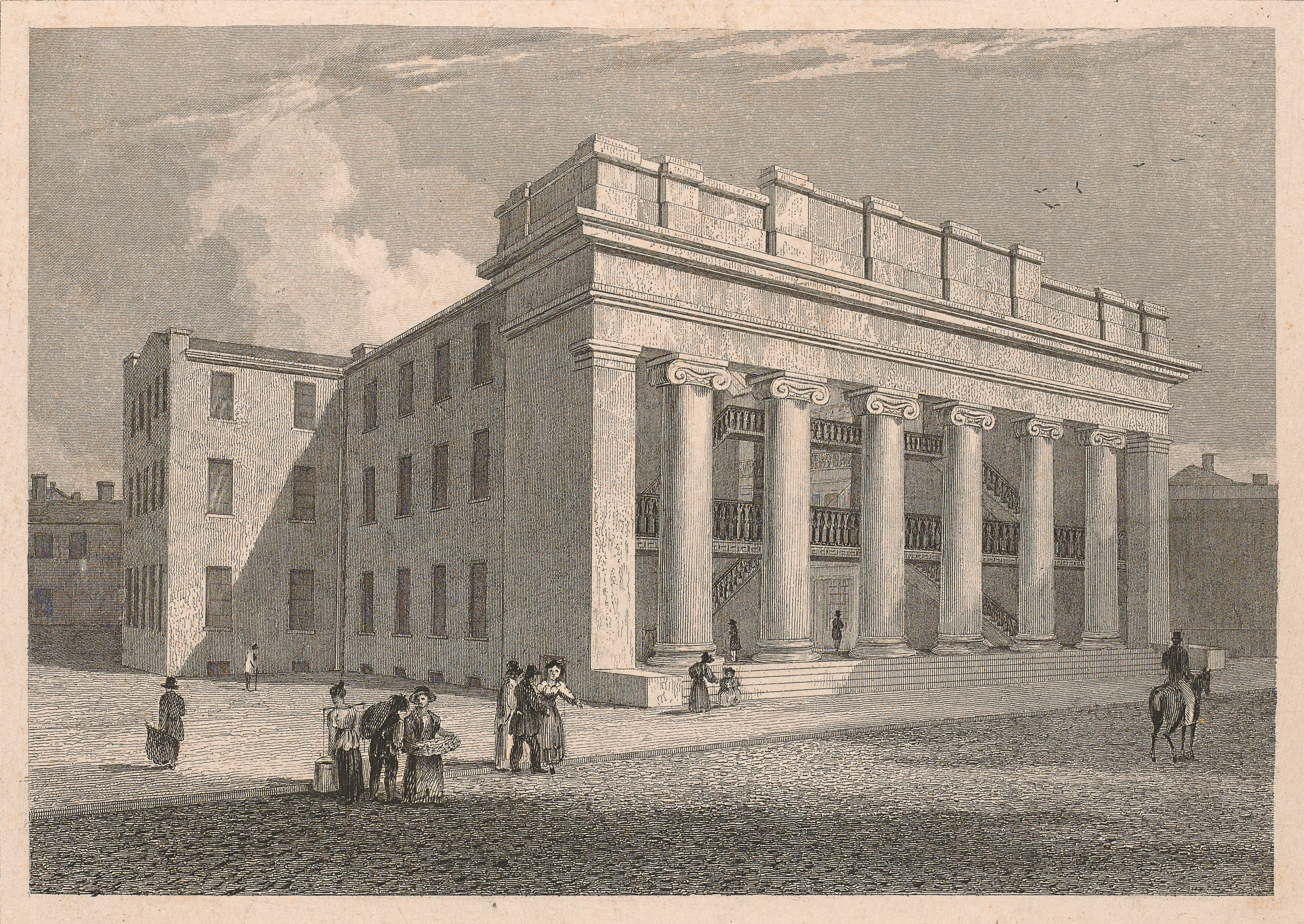
An 1836 engraving of the Weybosset St facade of the building

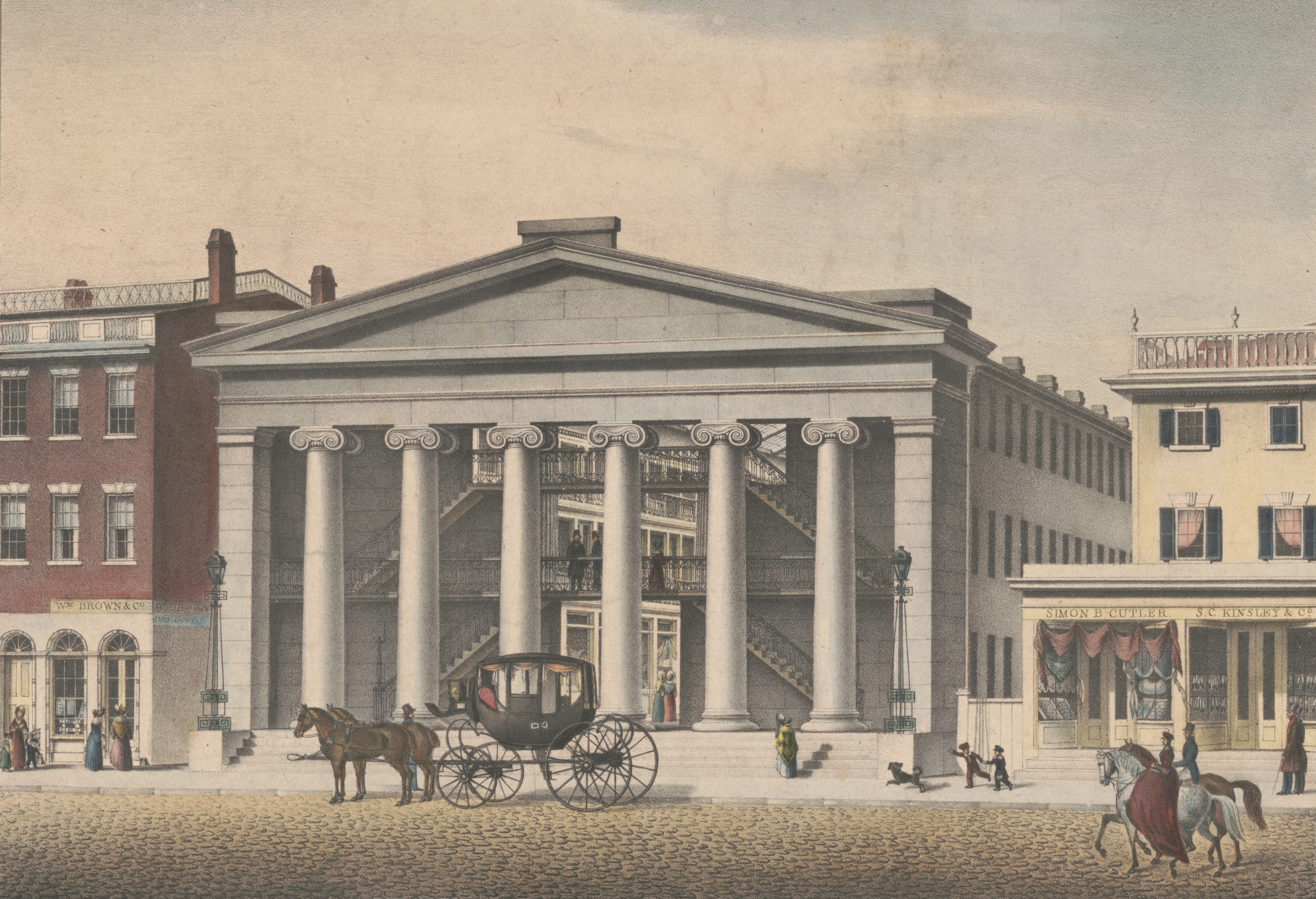
An 1836 lithograph of the arcade

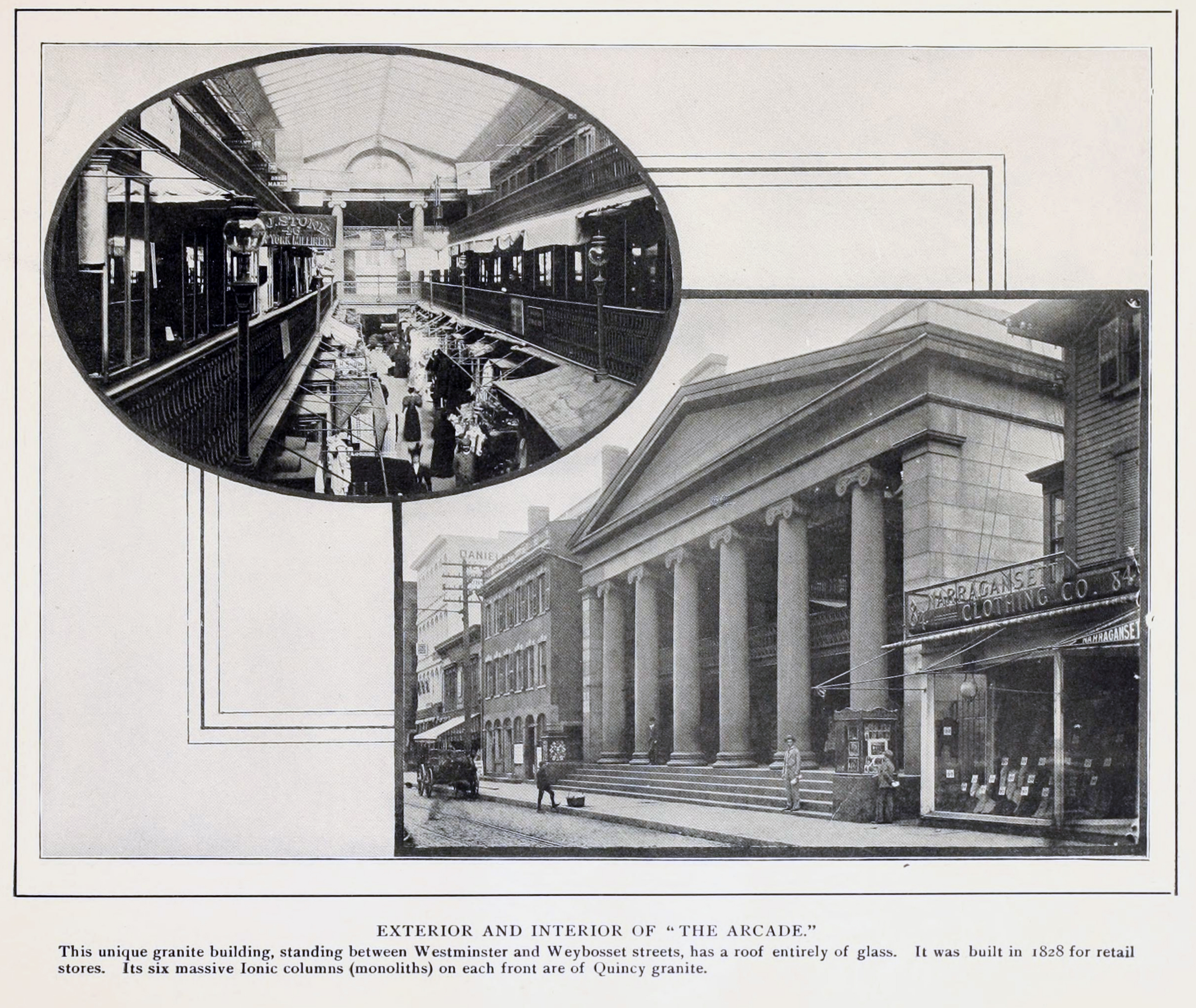
Westminster arcade from Views of Providence (1900)

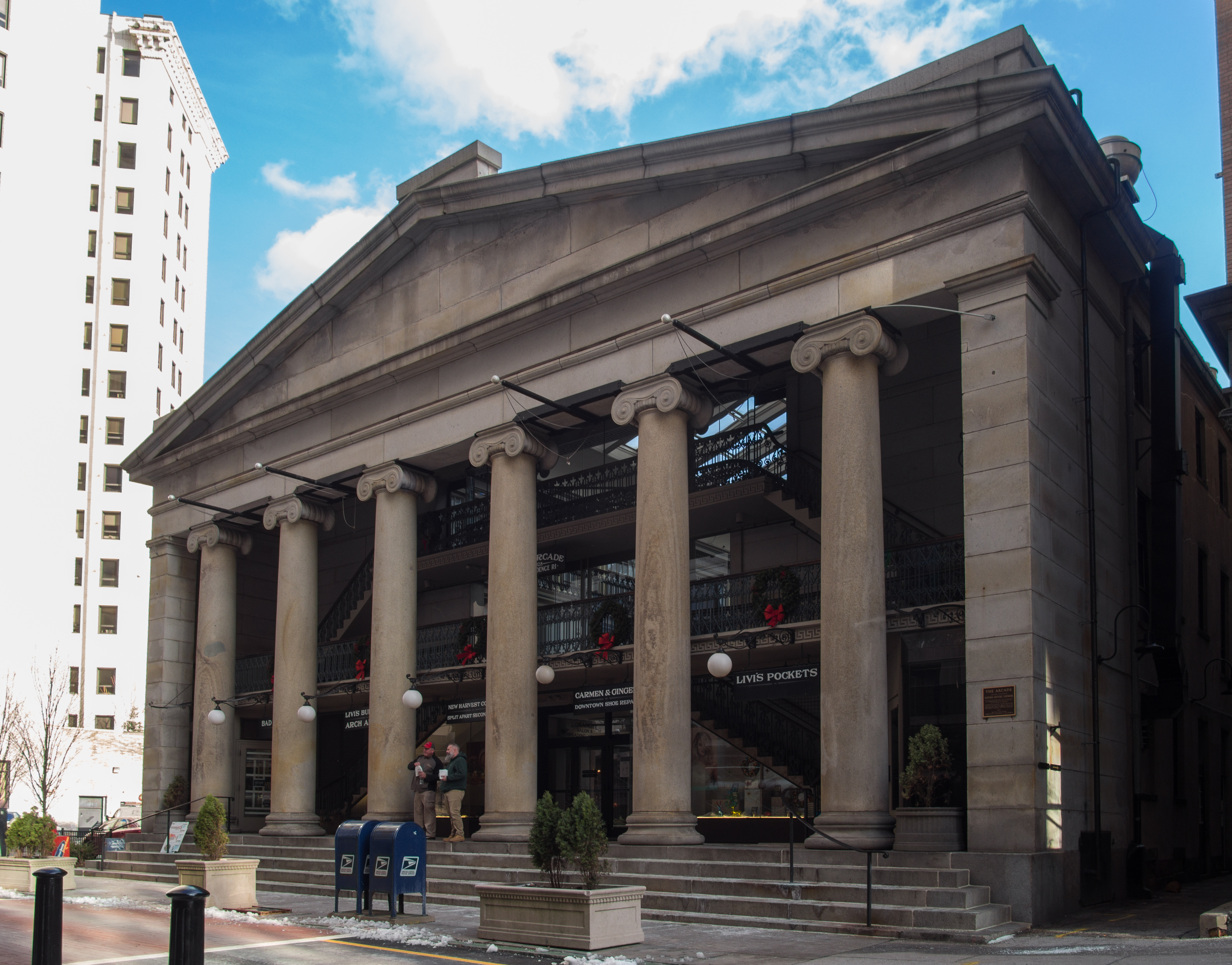
The Westminster St. facade

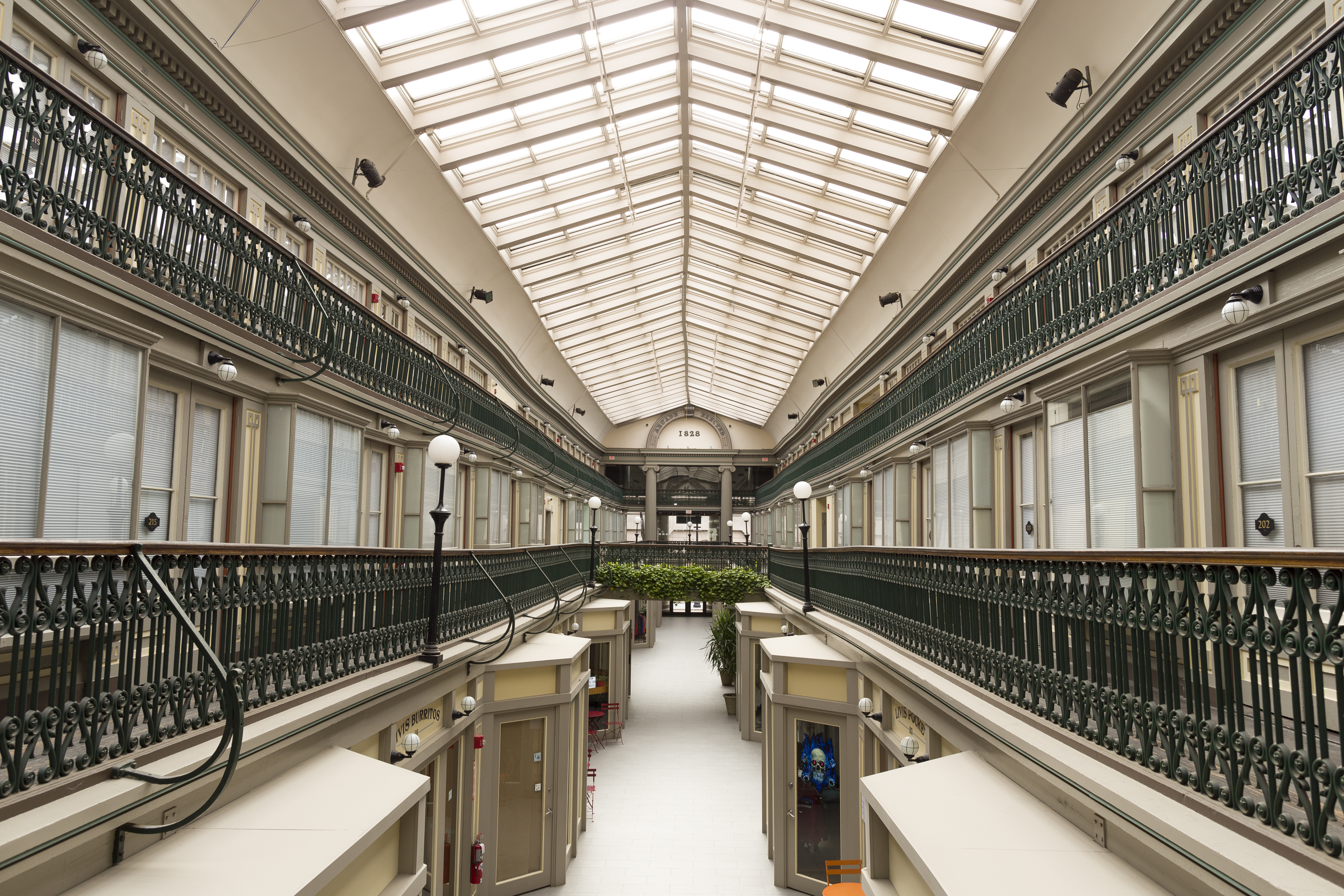
The interior as seen from the second floor

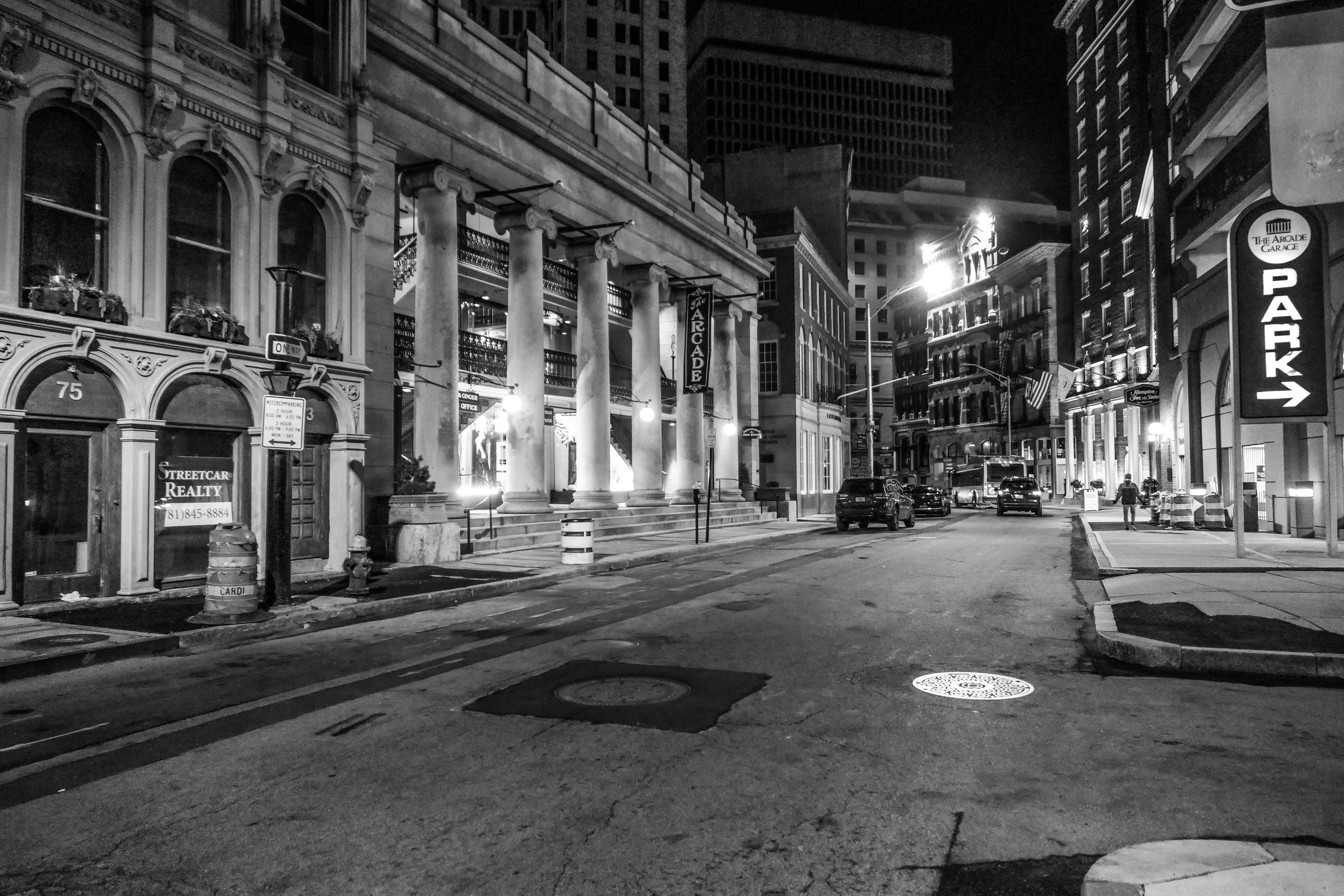
The exterior at night

== See also ==
- List of National Historic Landmarks in Rhode Island
- National Register of Historic Places listings in Providence, Rhode Island
