= Museum of Work and Culture =

Museum in Woonsocket, Rhode Island, U.S.

Coordinates: 41.999303°N 71.516067°W

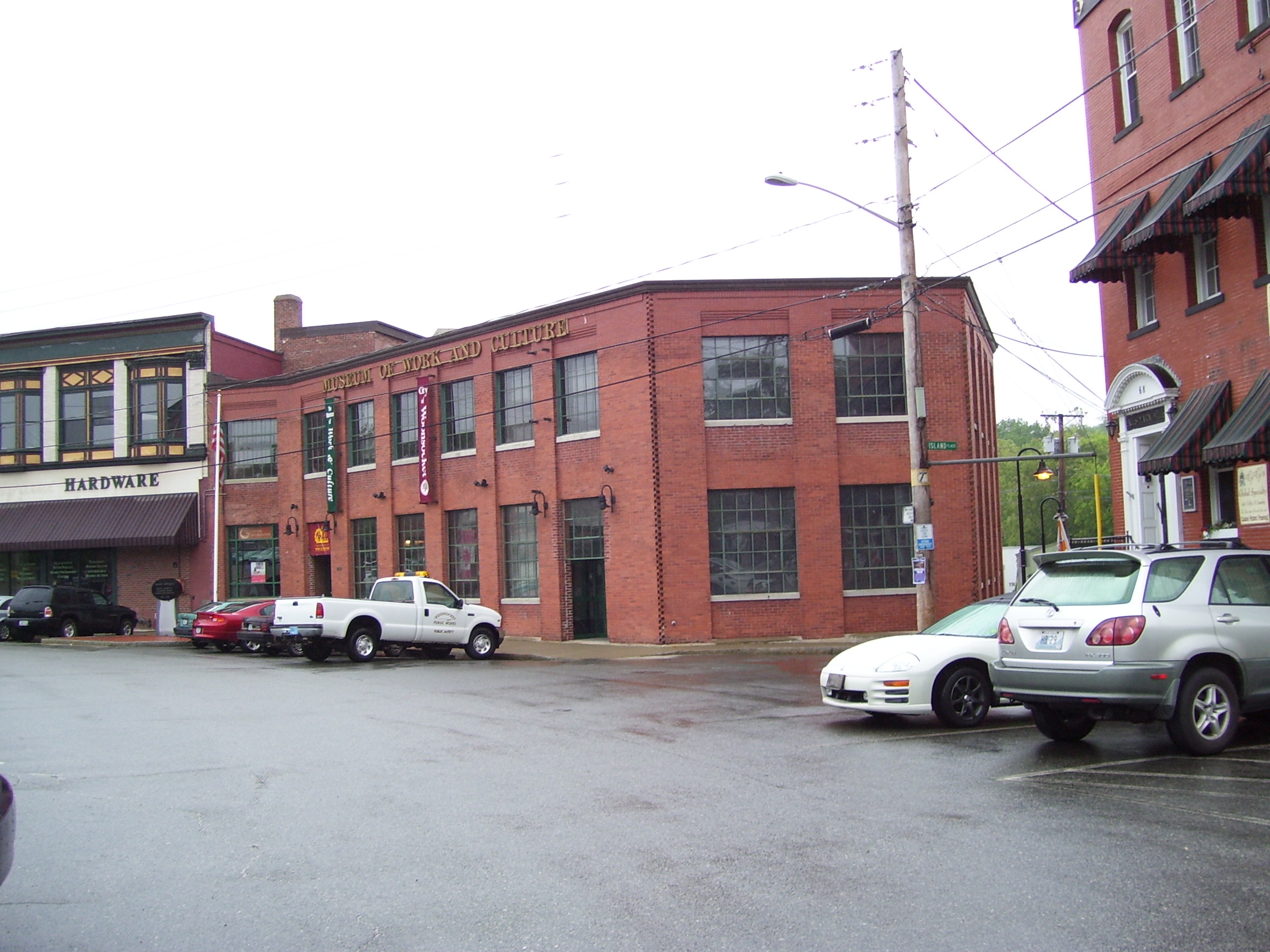
Museum of Work and Culture main building

The Museum of Work and Culture is a museum in Woonsocket, Rhode Island, that features exhibits focusing on the city's textile manufacturing heritage. The museum is operated by the Rhode Island Historical Society and located at 42 South Main Street in Market Square in the Blackstone River Valley National Heritage Corridor.

== About The Museum ==
In the late 19th and early 20th centuries, immigrants flocked to Rhode Island in search of work and prosperity within the state's mill towns. Their labors - both on and off the factory floor - helped define the culture of the Blackstone River Valley. Today, the Museum of Work and Culture preserves their stories for future generations. Visitors begin their journey in a farmhouse and imagine the experience of agricultural life in nineteenth-century Québec. From there they cross the border into the United States and enter the workday world of the Industrial Era. The Museum's other exhibits recreate the new settlers' life at home, at work, and at school, and present the story of the Independent Textiles Union (I.T.U.). The Museum of Work and Culture explores the continued impact of the industrial revolution and honors the experience of the people, past and present, who have enriched the Blackstone River Valley.
