= Henry J. Steere =

American philanthropist and industrialist

- Born: April 11, 1830; Providence, Rhode Island
- Died: October 28, 1889 (aged 59)

Signature
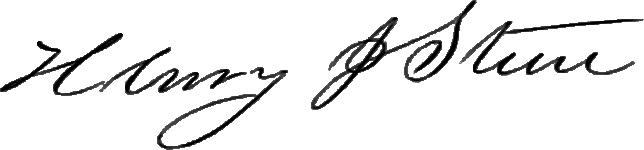

Henry Jonah Steere (1830–1889) was a prominent American philanthropist and industrialist from Rhode Island.

== Childhood ==
Jonah Steere, father of Henry J. Steere, portrait now owned by Beneficent Congregational Church

Henry J. Steere was born in Providence, Rhode Island on April 11, 1830 to Alice Smith (1789–1863) and Jonah Steere (1788–1871), a manufacturer, saddler and harness maker. Henry was their only surviving child. Steere was a Yankee, whose ancestor John Steere immigrated to the Providence from Great Britain before 1660 and married the daughter of Reverend William Wickenden. Henry J. Steere was educated at home and in the public schools, eventually graduating from Providence's high school. Steere then became a clerk in the Merchants Bank.

Steere served as a lieutenant in the First Light Infantry Regiment of the Rhode Island Militia. During the Civil War he served at Portsmouth Grove, Rhode Island as part of the guard of the Lovell General Hospital.

== Business endeavors ==
Steere entered the textile manufacturing business, eventually building mills in the towns of Providence, Burrillville, Smithfield, and Glocester. Steere was also president or a director of Northern Bank, Globe National Bank, Fifth National Bank, Washington Insurance Company, Economical Insurance Company, and City Savings Bank. Among his business concerns was the Waskuck Mills which Steere founded with Jesse Metcalf and Stephen Olney. Because of the mills’ rapid success, expansions were made by Steere on Wild Street in 1884 and on Douglas Avenue by the company in 1893. The mills were named Steere Mills and Geneva Mills. The company later expanded its operations outside of Providence, building both Mohegan and Oakland Mills. Steere died on October 28, 1889, of sudden kidney problems with no children or surviving siblings. Steere was buried at North Burial Ground in Providence.

== Philanthropy and legacy ==
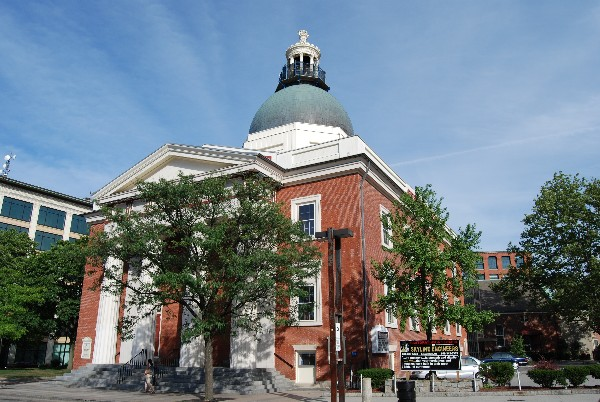
Henry J. Steere was a member and large donor to Beneficent Congregational Church.

Steere was the co-founder and benefactor of the Providence Home For Aged Men, now known as Steere House.

Henry J. Steere's house in Barrington

Henry Steere left his $1.139 million fortune (about $22 million in 2006 dollars) to many individuals and charities. $654,000 was given to individuals in sums ranging from $10,000 to $100,000, including bequests of money and real property to the children of his first cousin Seth Hunt Steere, including Senator Arthur Steere. Other individuals receiving bequests and trusts included: Jesse H. Metcalf, Mary Ann White, Lydia Jane Westcott, Charles H. Atwood, Horace Steere, Job Steere, Asa Westcott, Charles S. Westcott, Frances Irons, Smith Salisbury, Daniel Salisbury, Joseph Salisbury, Stephen Metcalf, Marton Metcalf, Eliza Radeke, Sophia Baker, Alfred Metcalf, Emily Arnold, Thomas Holden, Thomas Steere, Julia Miner, Charles H. Steere, Seth H. Steere Edward Knowles, Lee Salisbury, Nelson Steere, and Albert Steere. Steere donated $340,000 to charities including: Steere House Nursing and Rehabilitation Center (home of Oscar the cat, noted for his purported ability to predict imminent death), Beneficent Congregational Church, St. Stephen's Episcopal Church, Rhode Island Historical Society, Roanoke College, and Tabor College in Iowa.

Throughout his life, Steere had been active as a member of the Franklin Society of the Rhode Island Historical Society and as a trustee of Rhode Island Hospital. Steere built Beneficent Congregational Church as a memorial to his father with a donation of $30,000. A descendant of Arthur Steere, one of Steere's devisees currently runs the Henry J. Steere Orchards in Greenville, Rhode Island.
