= Beneficent Congregational Church =

Historic church in Rhode Island, United States

- U.S. National Register of Historic Places
- U.S. Historic district – Contributing property
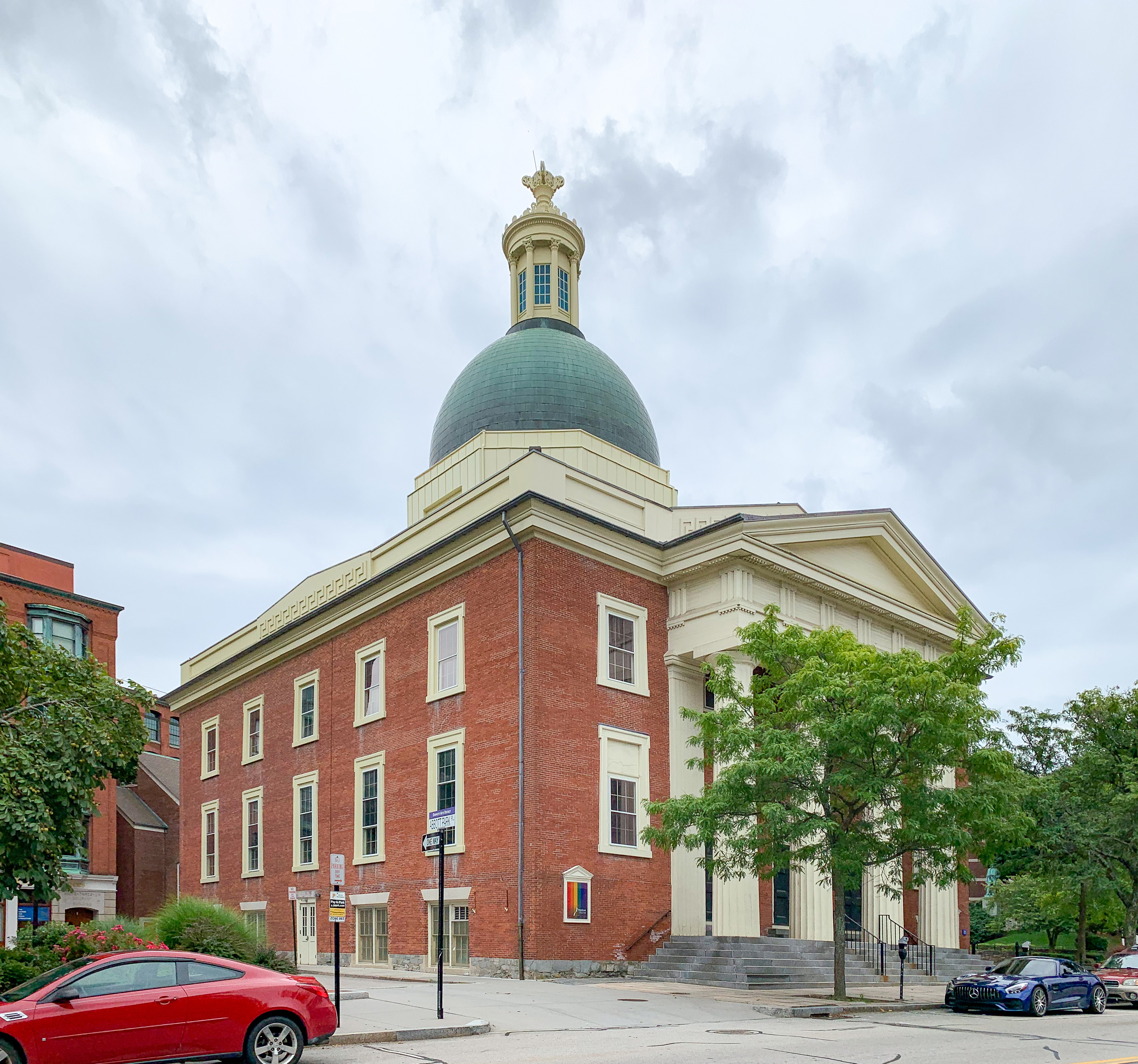

- Location within Rhode Island Location within the United States
- Location: Providence, Rhode Island
- Coordinates: 41°49′11″N 71°24′51″W
- Built: 1809
- Architect: Barnard Eddy; John Newman; Tallman & Bucklin\James Bucklin
- Architectural style: Greek Revival
- Part of: Downtown Providence Historic District (ID84001967)
- NRHP reference No.: 72000035

Significant dates
- Added to NRHP: January 13, 1972
- Designated CP: February 10, 1984

The Beneficent Congregational Church is a United Church of Christ Congregationalist church located at 300 Weybosset Street in downtown Providence, Rhode Island.

== History ==
The congregation was founded in 1743 during the "First Great Awakening" as a separatist spin-off from a Congregationalist group on the east side of the Providence River, and built their first sanctuary on this site. The current church was built in 1809 and was extensively remodeled in the Greek Revival style in 1836.

The building was added to the National Register of Historic Places in 1972.

== Architecture ==
The current church building is a brick Greek Revival structure which features a prominent dome. The current structure – the second Meeting House on this location – was built in 1809 to plans by Barnard Eddy and John Newman, the latter of whom supervised construction. It was substantially altered in the Greek Revival style in 1836 to a design by James C. Bucklin of Tallman & Bucklin, although the basic overall configuration of the building was not changed. The Doric columns were added at this time. This work was funded with a $30,000 donation from textile entrepreneur Henry J. Steere in honor of his father, Jonah Steere. Steere also gave to the church a chandelier containing 5,673 pieces of Austrian crystal.

The church bears a striking similarity in style to the Massachusetts State House in Boston, designed by Charles Bulfinch. Prior to about 2007, the church's dome was covered with gold leaf which gave it a distinctive appearance. Due to weather damage to the gold leaf, the congregation voted in 1987 to replace the roof with more durable copper sheeting as part of a larger renovation project. This copper sheeting gives the dome its current green patina. The ceiling inside the Meeting House is curved at the edges, but doesn't indicate that the building is topped by a dome.

== Community engagement ==
A member of the United Church of Christ (UCC) denomination, Beneficent chose to become an "Open and Affirming" congregation in 2001. The church supports local and community ministries like the Providence Gay Men's Chorus, RPM Voices, and 12-step meetings, as well as overseas ministries managed by the regional and national UCC bodies.

== Gallery ==
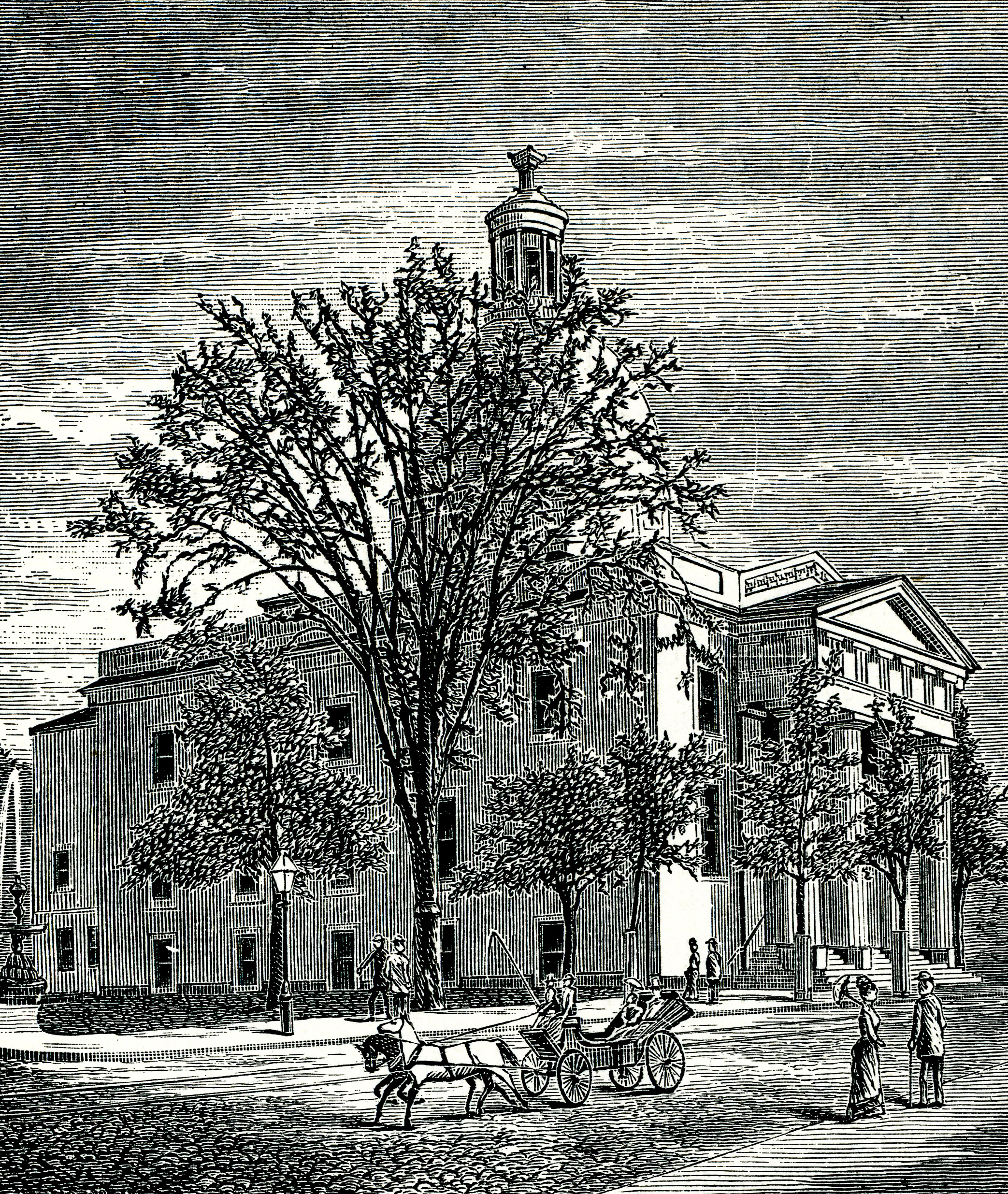
1886 engraving

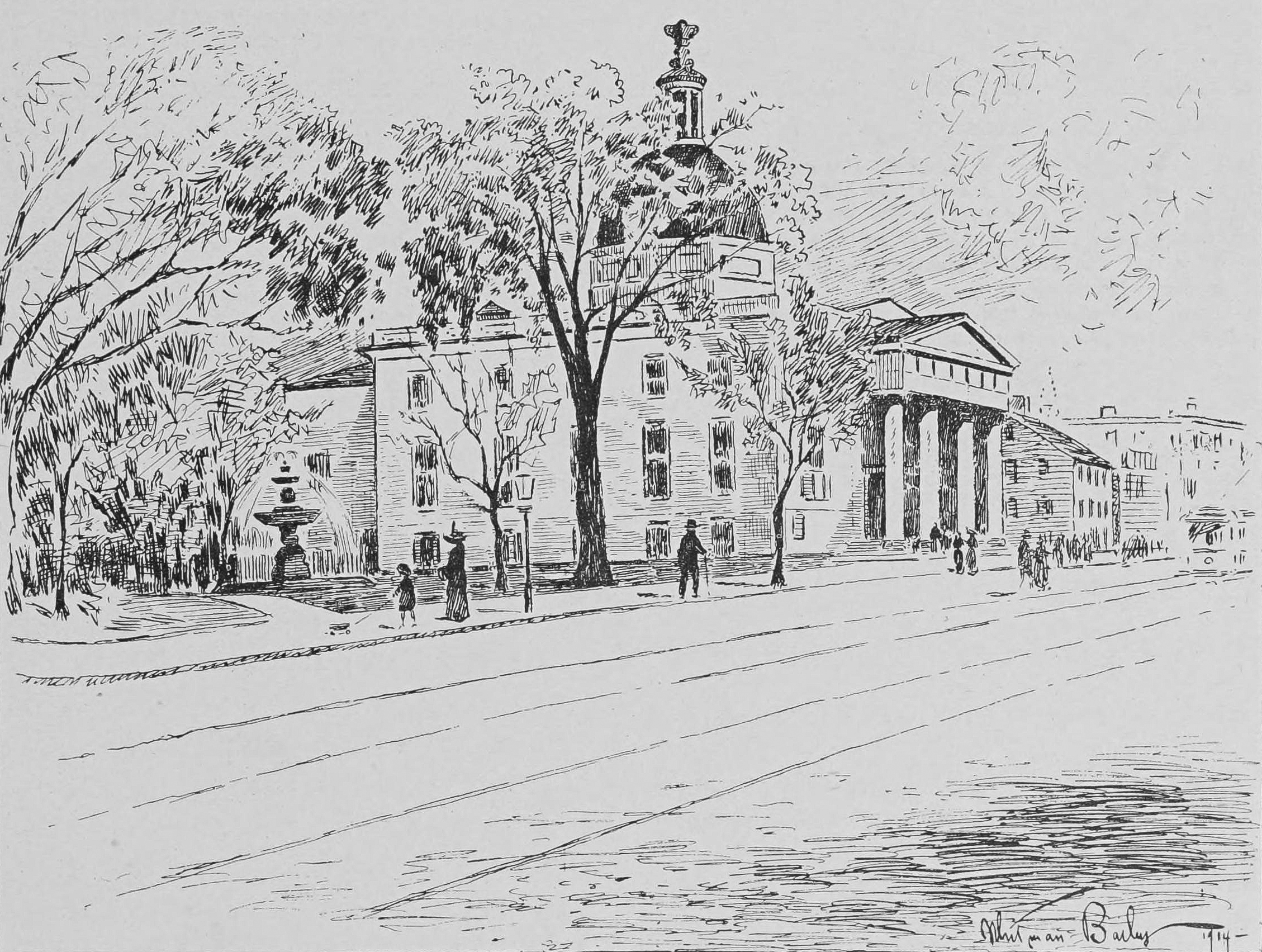
A 1914 drawing of the church

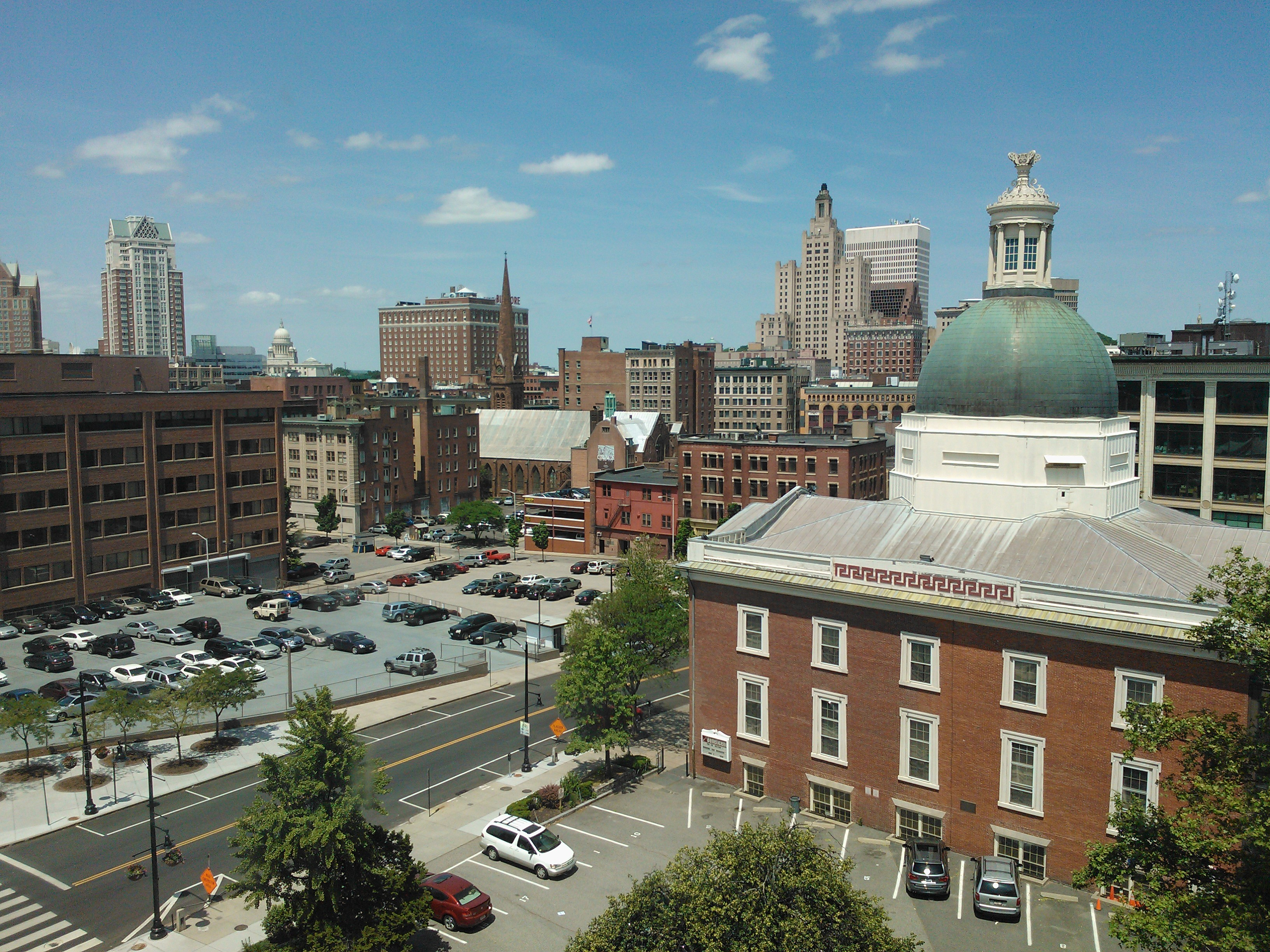
Side view of the building, 2012

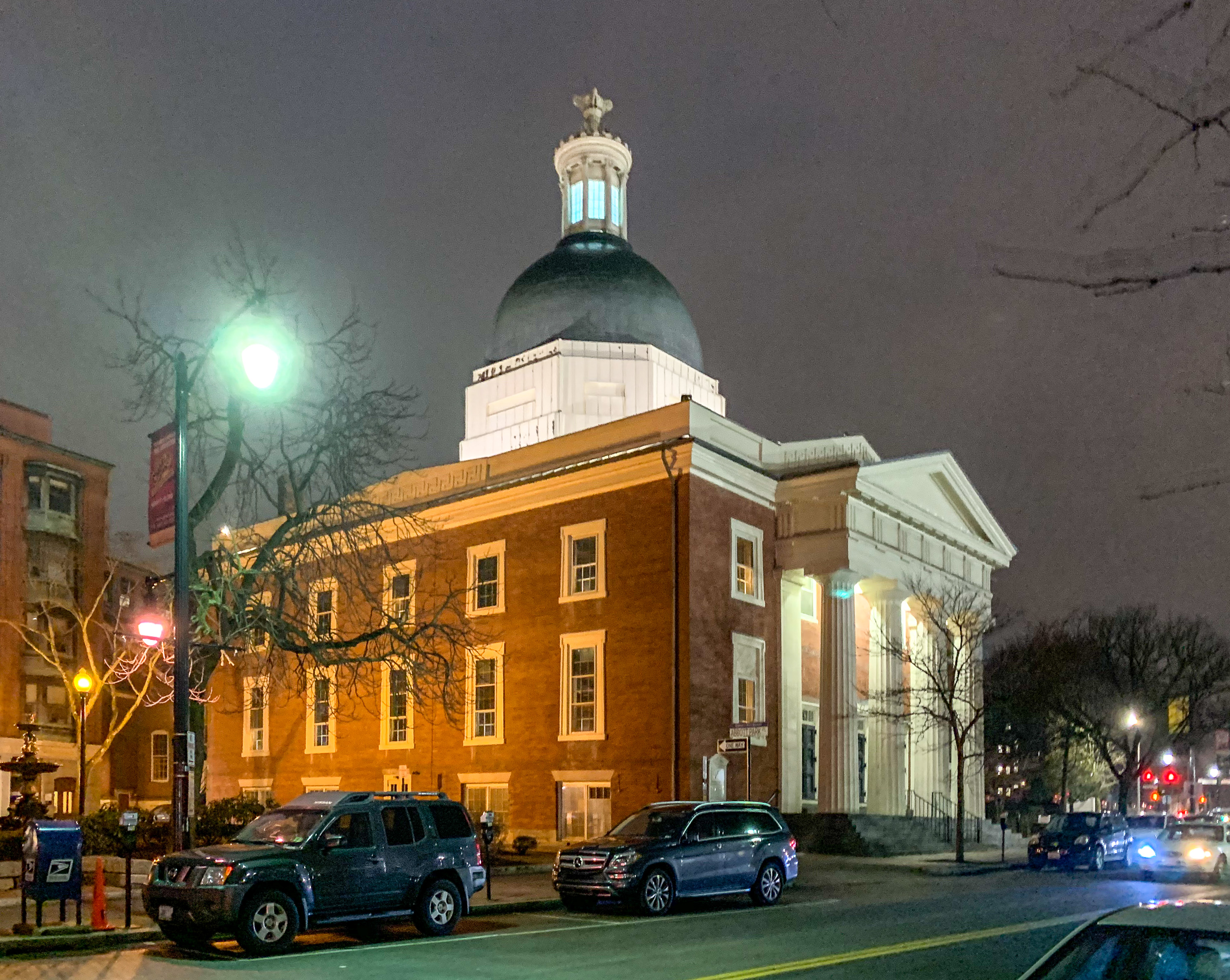
Night view, 2019

== Senior Pastors ==
- Joseph Snow Jr. (served 1743–1793)
- James "Paddy" Wilson, M.A. (served 1793–1839)
- Mark Tucker, D.D. (served 1839–1845)
- John Payne Cleveland, D.D. (served 1846–1853)
- Alexander Huntington Clapp, D.D. (served 1855–1865)
- James Gardiner Vose, D.D. (served 1866–1901)
- Asbury E. Krom (served 1901–1932)
- Arthur Edward Wilson, D.D., L.H.D. (served 1933–1967)
- Edward King Hempel Jr. (served 1968–1970)
- August Ralph Barlow Jr. (served 1970–1997)
- Richard Henry Taylor (served 1999–2006)
- Nicole Grant Yonkman and Todd Grant Yonkman (served 2009–2016)
- Elizabeth Chandler Felts (serving 2019–present)

== See also ==
- National Register of Historic Places listings in Providence, Rhode Island
