= Rhode Island Historical Society =

Non-profit organization in the USA

Coordinates: 41.8253°N 71.3957°W

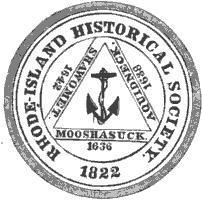
Rhode Island Historical Society Seal, using a variation of the Rhode Island Seal.

The Rhode Island Historical Society is a privately endowed membership organization, founded in 1822, dedicated to collecting, preserving, and sharing the history of Rhode Island. Its offices are located in Providence, Rhode Island.

== History ==
Founded in 1822, the Society is the fourth oldest state historical society in the United States (after the Massachusetts Historical Society, New-York Historical Society, and Maine Historical Society). The Rhode Island Historical Society was founded and funded by many of Providence's early Yankee philanthropists, including Moses Brown and Henry J. Steere. In 1854 the "Southern Cabinet" of the Rhode Island Historical Society became reorganized as the Newport Historical Society.

As of October 2022, the organization’s executive director is C. Morgan Grefe, Ph.D., and the board chair is Robert H. Sloan, Jr.

== Description ==
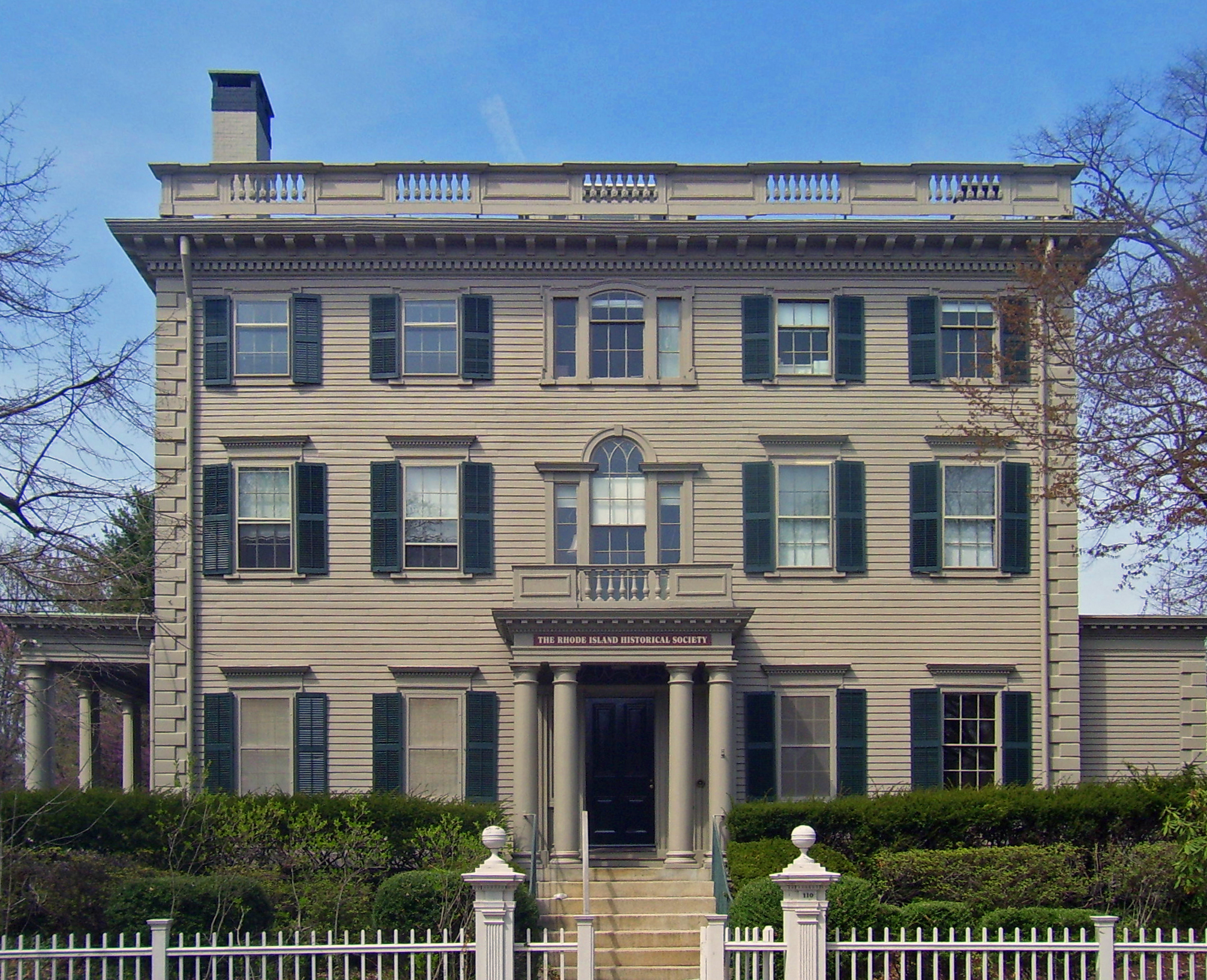
The Nelson W. Aldrich House in Providence, a National Historic Landmark that serves as the society's headquarters.

The Society has the largest and most important historical Rhode Island collection within its main library and two museums. The Society's collections include some 25,000 objects, 5,000 manuscripts, 100,000 books and printed items, 400,000 photographs and maps, and 9 million feet of motion-picture film. Through the Newell D. Goff Center for Education and Public Programs, the Society offers a variety of educational programs including workshops, lectures, films, and walking tours of Providence. In recent years the Society has been very active in teacher-training programs seeking to improve the quality of history teaching in Rhode Island. The Society also presents exhibits, films, concerts, and many other community activities and programs. The Society publishes its journal Rhode Island History in either two or three issues annually covering various aspects of Rhode Island history from pre-colonial to recent.

The Society’s most noteworthy recent advances include its first on-line collection access catalog and the first major restoration of the historic John Brown House, a $2.5 million project that should be complete in 2010.

== Properties ==
John Brown House photographed in 1918.

The Society owns and operates the following notable museums and properties:

- The Robinson Research Center (library) (121 Hope Street, Providence)
- John Brown House Museum, (52 Power Street, Providence) (a National Historic Landmark) built in 1786;
- Nelson W. Aldrich House (Society Headquarters/Goff Center) (110 Benevolent Street, Providence), also a National Historic Landmark, built in 1822;
- Museum of Work and Culture (42 South Main Street, Woonsocket), a regional history museum devoted to the ethnic history of northern Rhode Island.

== See also ==
- List of historical societies in Rhode Island
- List of libraries in Rhode Island
