= State Arsenal (Lincoln, Nebraska) =

- U.S. National Register of Historic Places
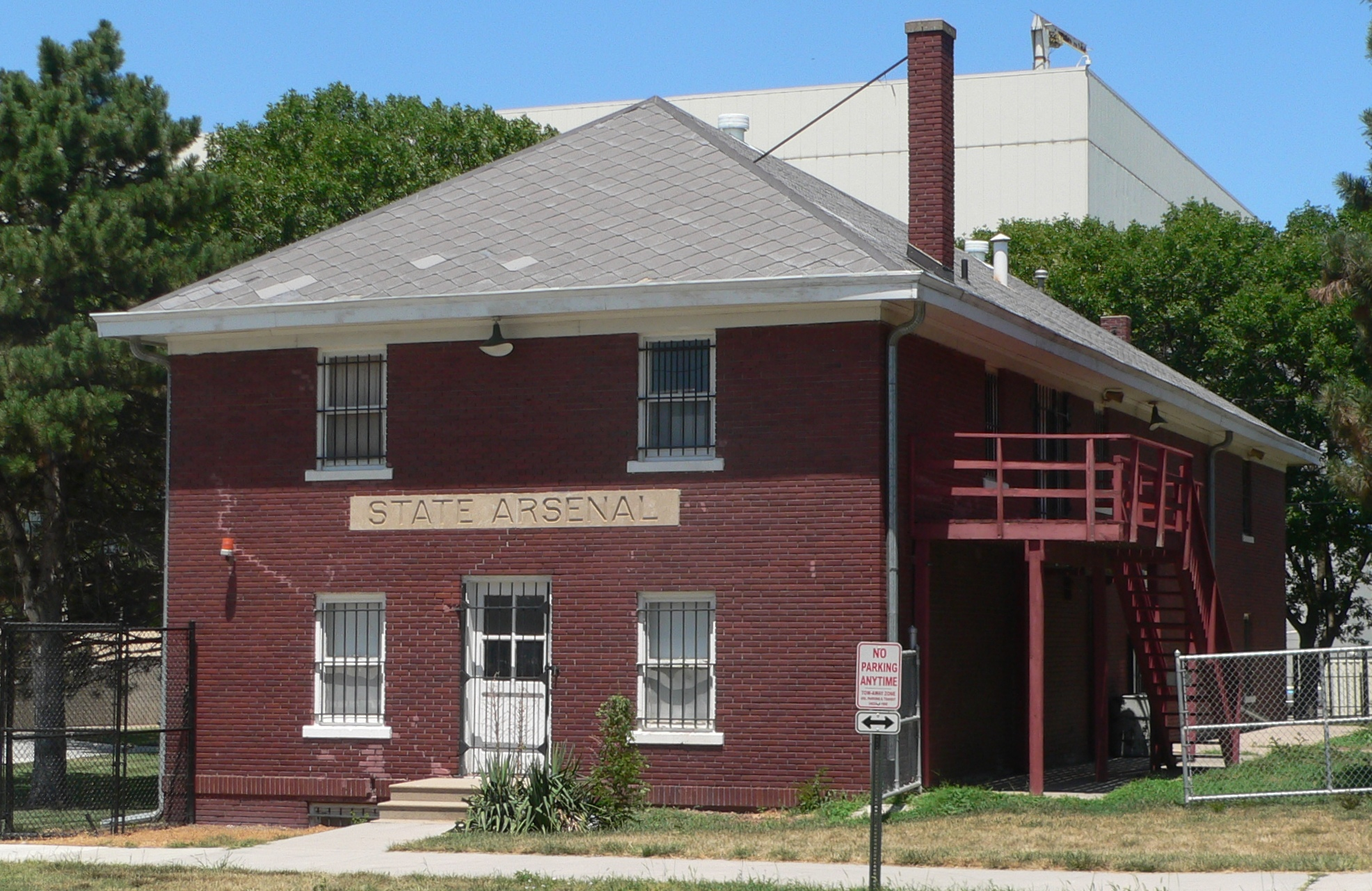
- State Arsenal, seen from the southeast

- Location within Nebraska Location within the United States
- Location: 17th and Court Street; Lincoln, Nebraska
- Coordinates: 40°49′45.2″N 96°41′49″W
- Area: Less than one acre
- Built: 1913
- Architect: Miller, Burd F.
- NRHP reference No.: 81000372
- Added to NRHP: September 17, 1981

The State Arsenal, built in 1913 in Lincoln, Nebraska, was the first permanent facility provided by the Nebraska Legislature for support of the Nebraska National Guard, successor to the Nebraska Militia. The two-story, rectangular, concrete and brick building with a basement was used by the guard as a warehouse until 1963, when it was transferred to the state fair board. On January 1, 2010, the state fair board transferred ownership of the arsenal building and the surrounding property to the University of Nebraska–Lincoln.

The building was the former site of the Nebraska National Guard Museum, which moved to a new location in Seward, Nebraska, in 2014.
