= State Arsenal (Providence, Rhode Island) =

- U.S. National Register of Historic Places
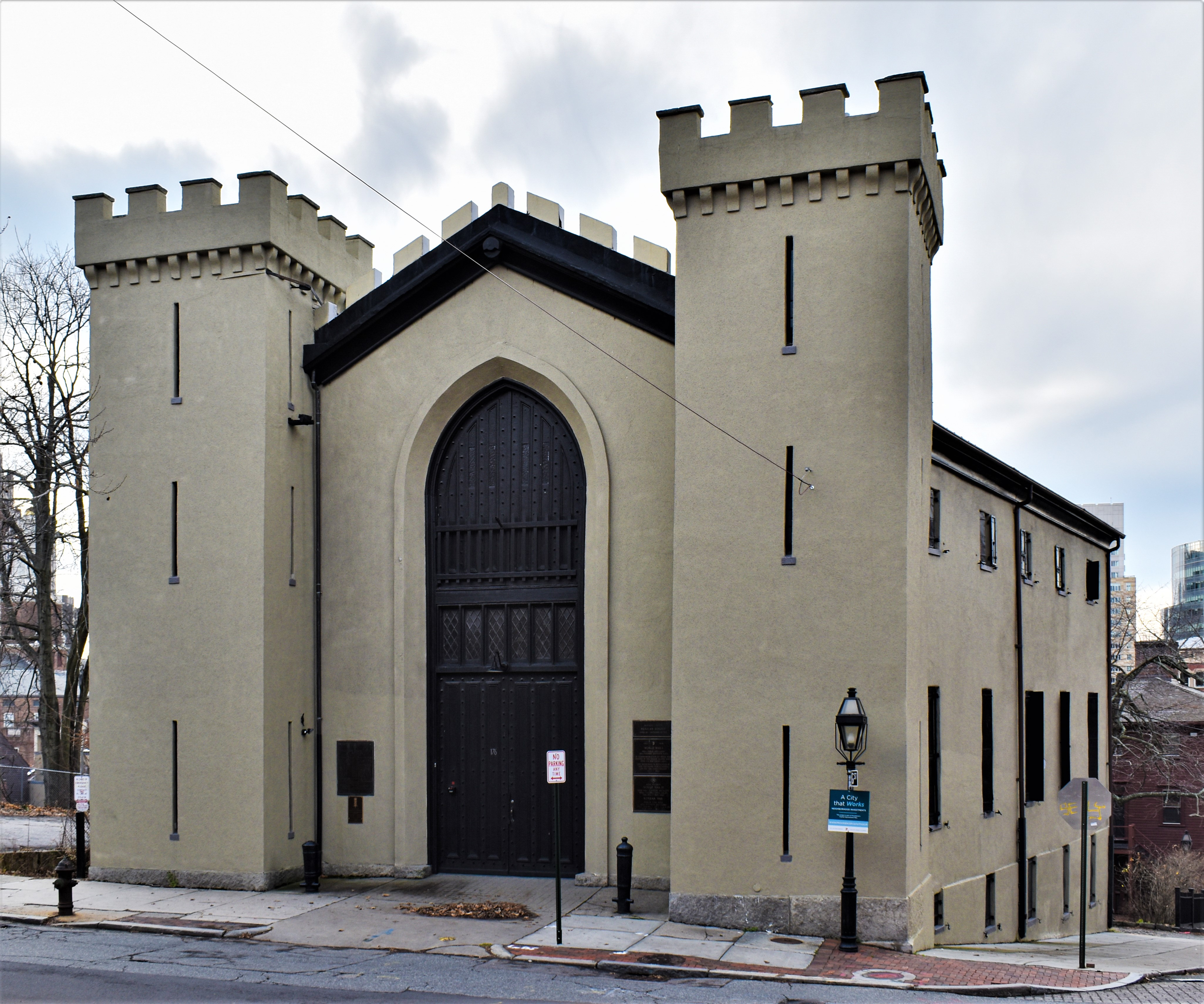
- (2020)

- Location within Rhode Island
- Location: Providence, Rhode Island
- Coordinates: 41°49′42″N 71°24′32″W
- Built: 1843
- Built by: Tallman & Bucklin
- Architect: James C. Bucklin
- Architectural style: Gothic Revival
- NRHP reference No.: 70000003
- Added to NRHP: April 28, 1970

The State Arsenal, originally the Providence Marine Corps of Artillery Arsenal and commonly called the Benefit Street Arsenal, is a historic armory building located at 176 Benefit Street in the College Hill neighborhood of Providence, Rhode Island. It was built in 1843 to a Gothic Revival design by Providence architect James C. Bucklin.

The building was added to the National Register of Historic Places in 1970.

== History ==
The Benefit Street Arsenal was completed in March 1843 as the armory of the Providence Marine Corps of Artillery (PMCA), founded in 1801. The organization had not previously owned its own building; construction was in part prompted by the Dorr Rebellion, during which, in May 1842, the Dorrites had unsuccessfully assaulted the former state arsenal at the Dexter Training Ground. The new building was designed by Providence architect James C. Bucklin in the Gothic Revival style and built by the contracting firm to which he belonged, Tallman & Bucklin.

The arsenal is a two-story and basement building. Architect Bucklin was better known for his work in the Greek Revival style. To give the building a fortified appearance, he added battlemented towers and other simple Gothic detail to a front-gable building that is similar in form to his Greek buildings. The building, built of rubble masonry, was originally rusticated, but this was eliminated at an unknown early date. The main level is taken up by a large drill and assembly hall which, like the exterior, is Gothic in style.

In the 19th century the arsenal was used as the armory of the PMCA and associated artillery units in the Rhode Island Militia and was used as the mobilization site for 10 batteries of light artillery which were raised in Rhode Island during the American Civil War. In addition to the PMCA the arsenal was used by a number of organizations including the Grand Army of the Republic, Sons of Union Veterans of the Civil War and United Spanish War Veterans.

The building originally sat one lot south of its current location, where its parking lot is today, but was moved in 1906 to make way for the East Side Railroad Tunnel. It underwent additional rehabilitation in 1920.

On May 17, 1924, the Ku Klux Klan held an illegal meeting at the arsenal which attracted about 200 men. Governor William S. Flynn denounced the KKK and forbade the group from meeting on state property. In the 1980s the arsenal was in use by the Rhode Island National Guard's Education, Historical and Equal Opportunity offices. As of 2008 the arsenal was in use as the location for the annual presentation of the Order of Saint Barbara to soldiers of the 103d Field Artillery Regiment of the Rhode Island National Guard. It also serves as the headquarters of the PMCA (the de facto 103d Field Artillery veterans association) and houses a diverse collection of military artifacts.

The building was added to the National Register of Historic Places on April 28, 1970.

== Confusion with Light Infantry Armory ==
The arsenal's nomination to the National Register of Historic Places gives the building a date of 1839 and attributes its design to architect Russell Warren, an error repeated by other sources. Both of these are correctly assigned to the original Light Infantry Armory, built for the First Light Infantry on Meeting Street just below the Meeting Street Steps. The building was designed by Warren in the Egyptian Revival style, with construction superintended by captain William W. Brown.

In 1858 the First Light Infantry relocated to the first Infantry Hall in what is now the Case-Mead Building at the corner of Dorrance and Weybosset Streets and sold their Meeting Street building, which has been demolished.

In 1880 they moved into the better-known Infantry Hall (1880-1942) and Infantry Building on South Main Street. The organization was later incorporated into the Rhode Island State Guard and their last building was destroyed by fire in 1942.

== Gallery ==
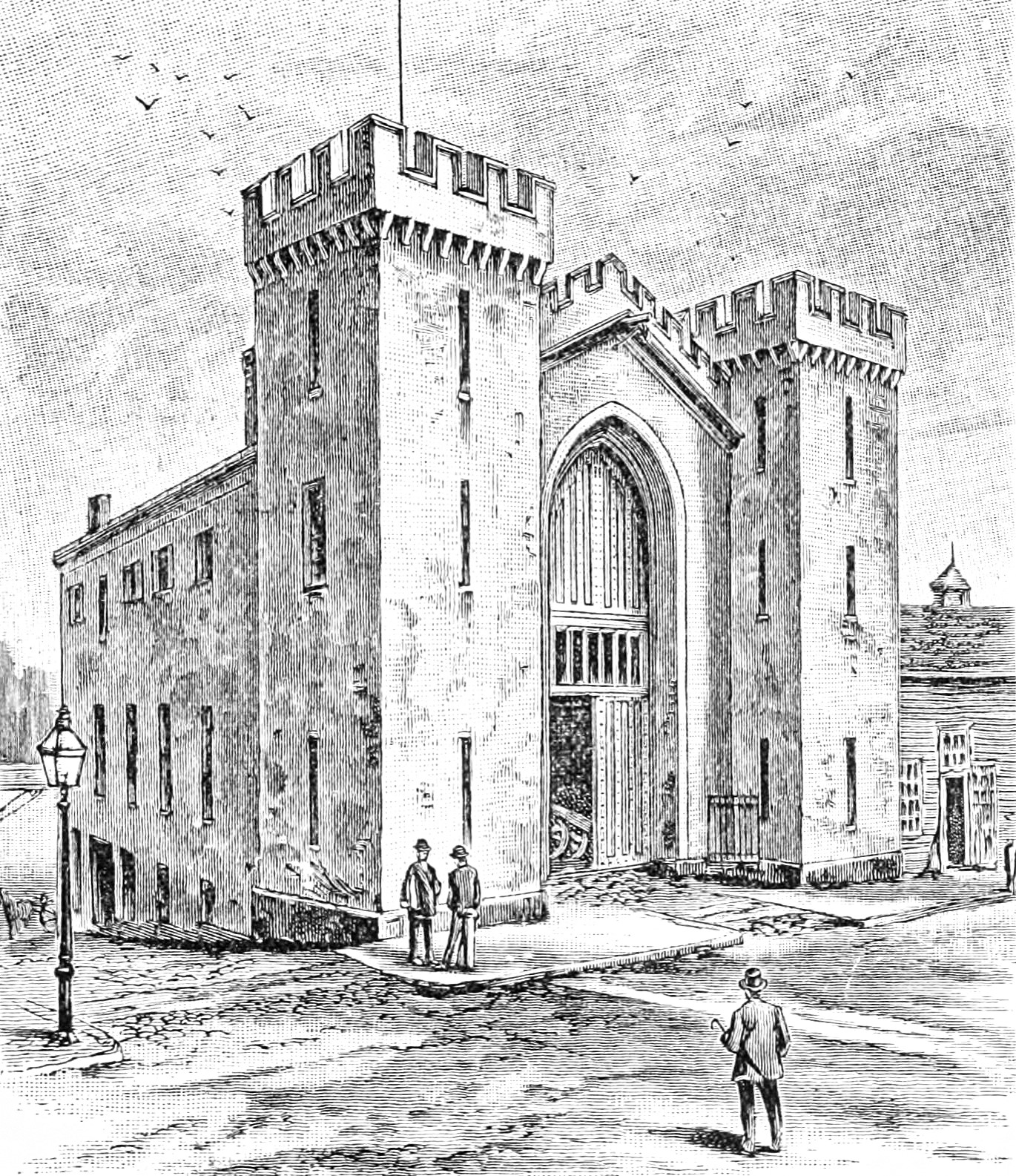
An 1888 engraving of the arsenal

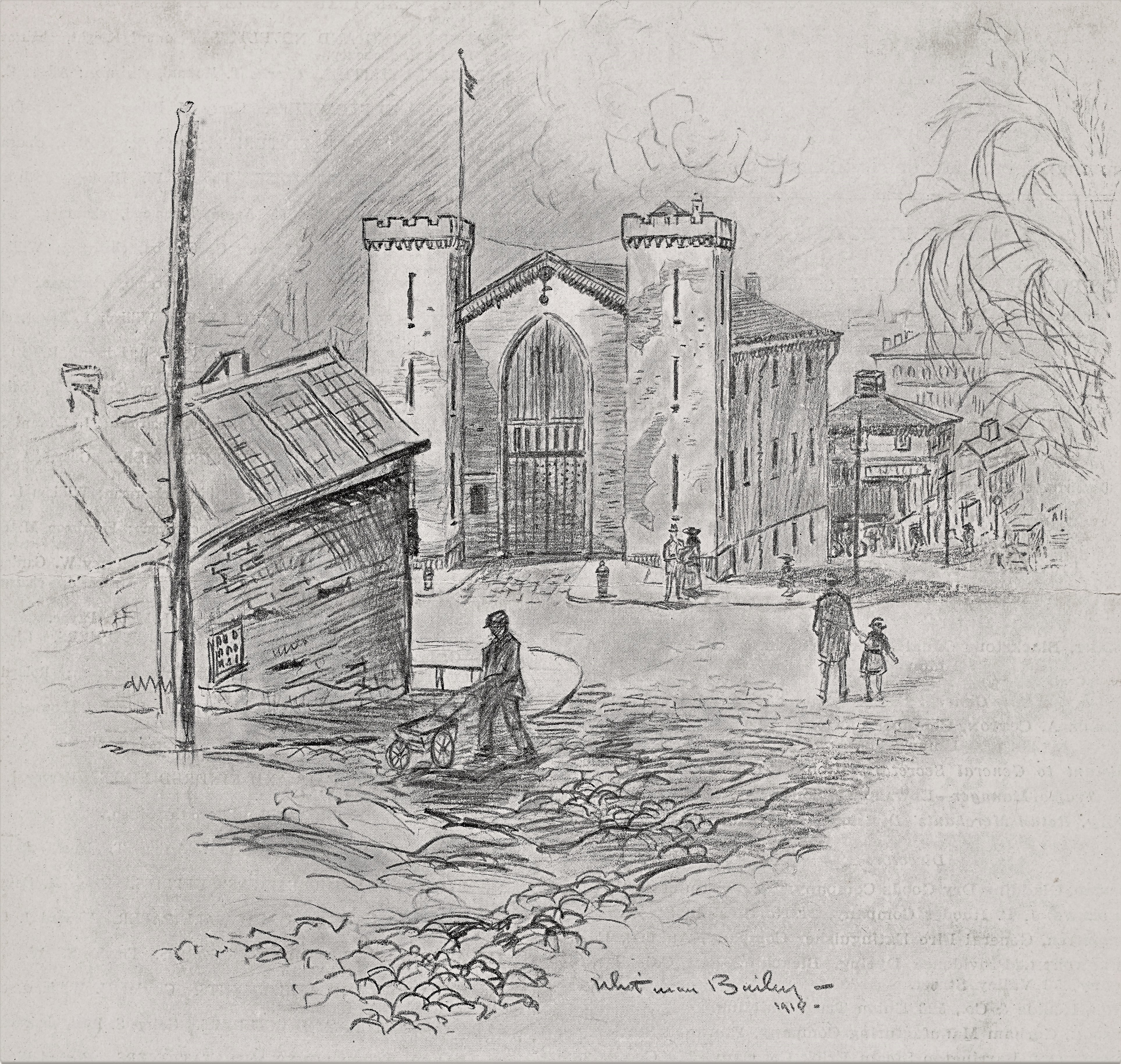
A 1918 sketch of the building

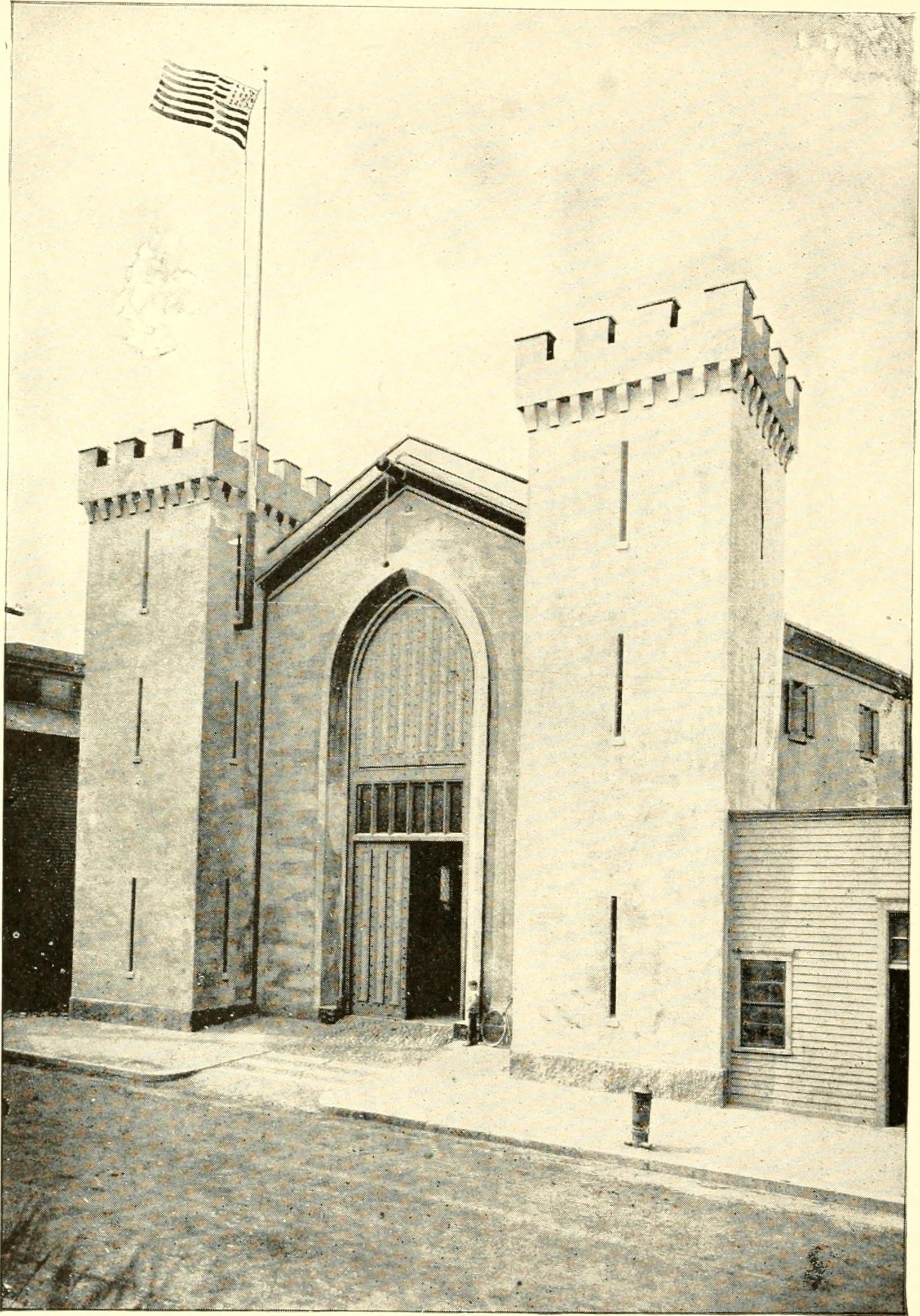
A 1920 photograph of the arsenal

== See also ==
- National Register of Historic Places listings in Providence, Rhode Island
