= Providence City Hall =

- U.S. National Register of Historic Places
- U.S. Historic district – Contributing property
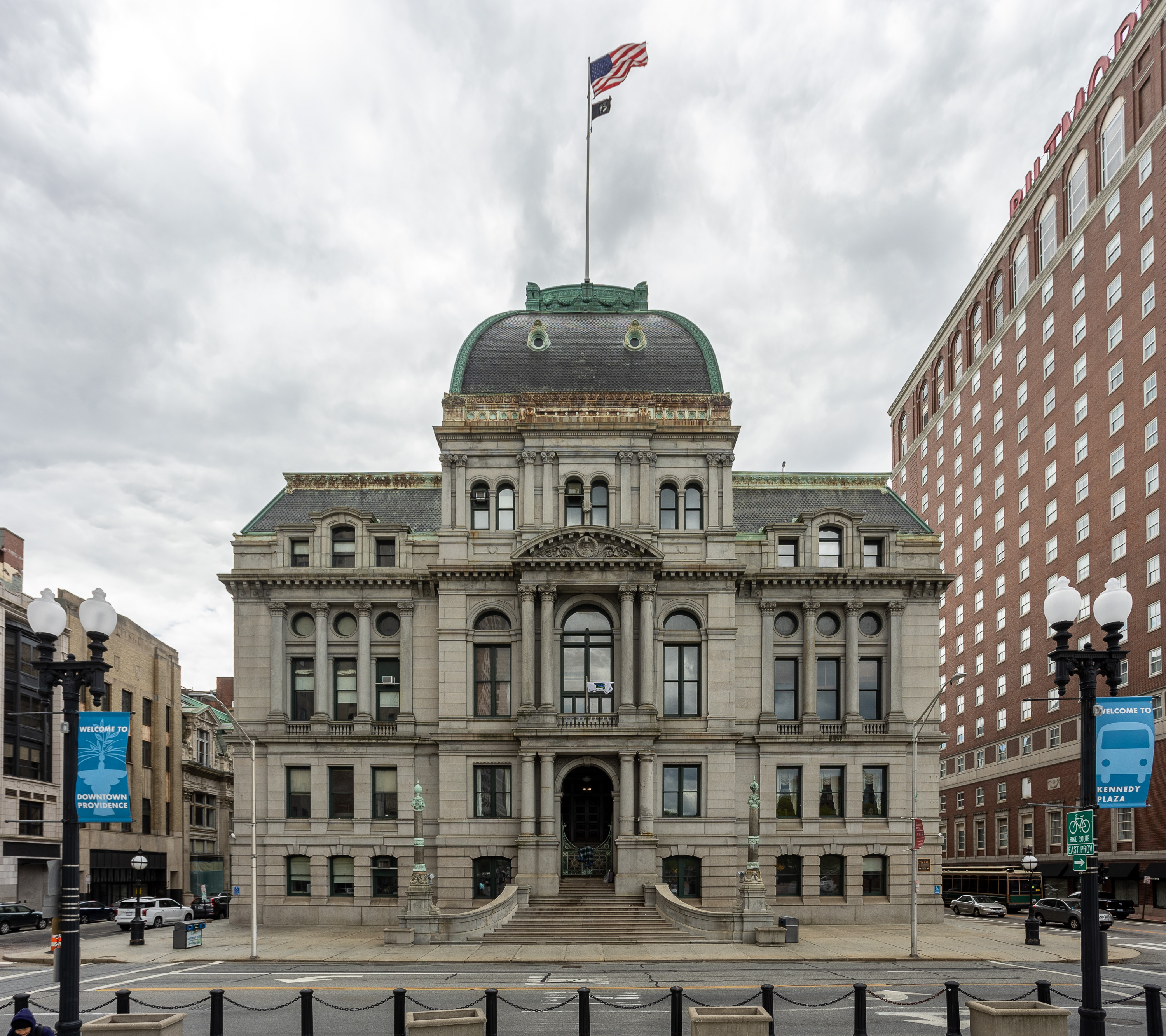
- Providence City Hall in 2021
- Location: 25 Dorrance Street, Providence, Rhode Island, U.S.
- Coordinates: 41°49′27.02″N 71°24′45.81″W
- Area: Downtown Providence
- Built: 1878
- Architect: Samuel J. F. Thayer
- Architectural style: Second Empire Baroque
- Part of: Downtown Providence Historic District (ID84001967)
- NRHP reference No.: 75000001

Significant dates
- Added to NRHP: January 23, 1975
- Designated CP: February 10, 1984

Providence City Hall is the center of the municipal government in Providence, Rhode Island. It is located at the southwest end of Kennedy Plaza at 25 Dorrance Street in Providence. The building was constructed between 1875 and 1878, and designed by Samuel J. F. Thayer in the Second Empire style. In 1975, the building was listed on the National Register of Historic Places. It is also a contributing structure to the broader Downtown Providence Historic District.

== Predecessors ==
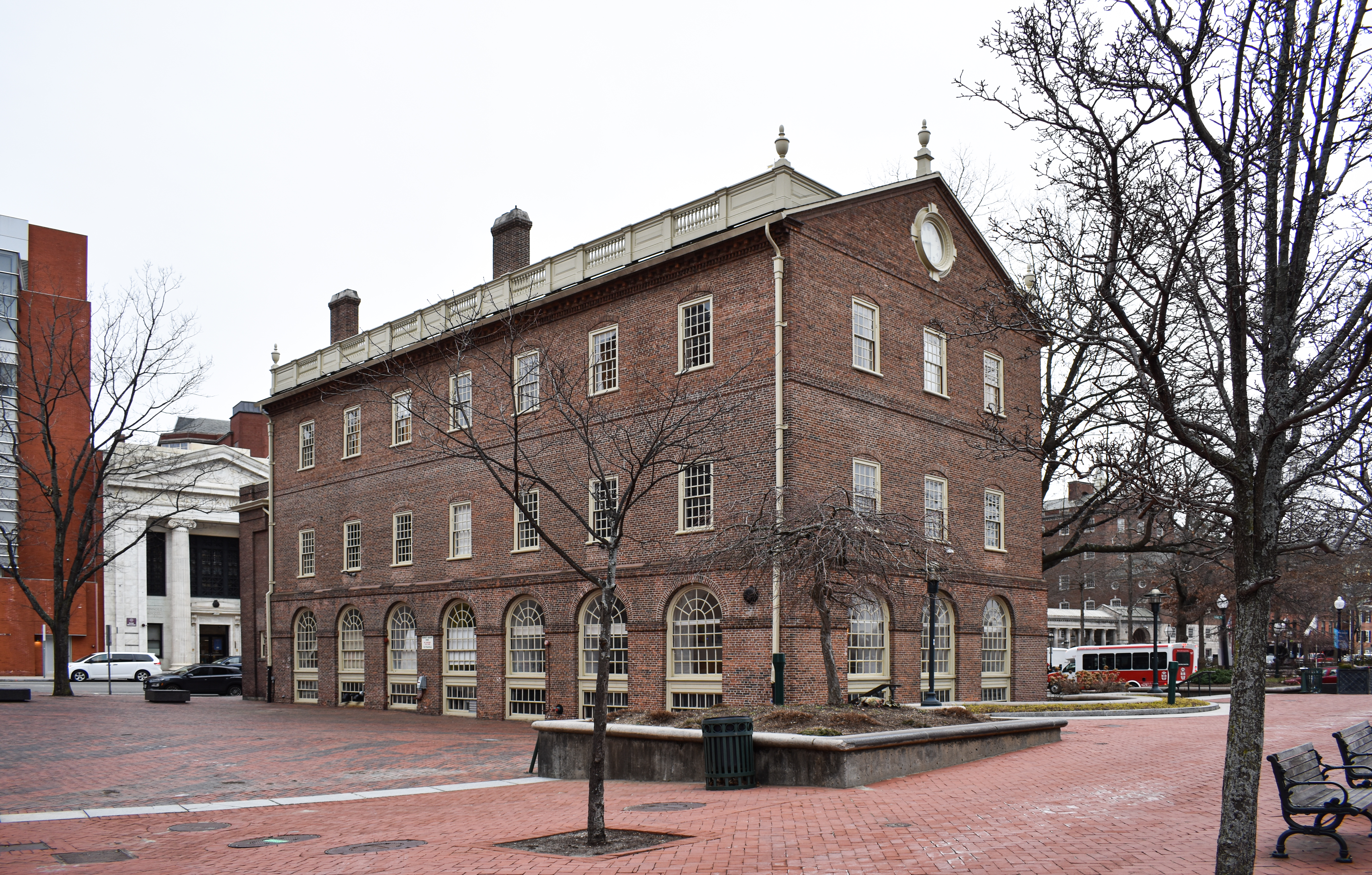
Market House long served as the seat of Providence's municipal government

=== Market House ===
Upon the city's incorporation in 1832, most city business was conducted at the Market House. The City Council, Mayor's Office, and Board of Aldermen were located on the second floor; as the city grew, the city spread to the third floor, and eventually took over the entire building, which became known as the "City Building." Before long, even this wasn't enough space, and in 1845 the City Council resolved to create a permanent municipal building. The community spent the next 30 years searching for a suitable location, because half the Council votes were on the east side of the Providence River, and half the votes were on the west. This resulted in what some historians have referred to as "Providence's Thirty Years War," as the council bickered over where to site the new building.

=== City Hall Theater ===
The city purchased several lots for the construction of a new City Hall. Construction was delayed, however, and the land was leased to C.N. Harrington, who built a wood frame theater on the site. The theater was notable for lectures, performances and readings that included writer Charles Dickens. In 1869, the building was renamed "Harrington Opera House." In 1874, the structure was closed for demolition.

== Building history ==
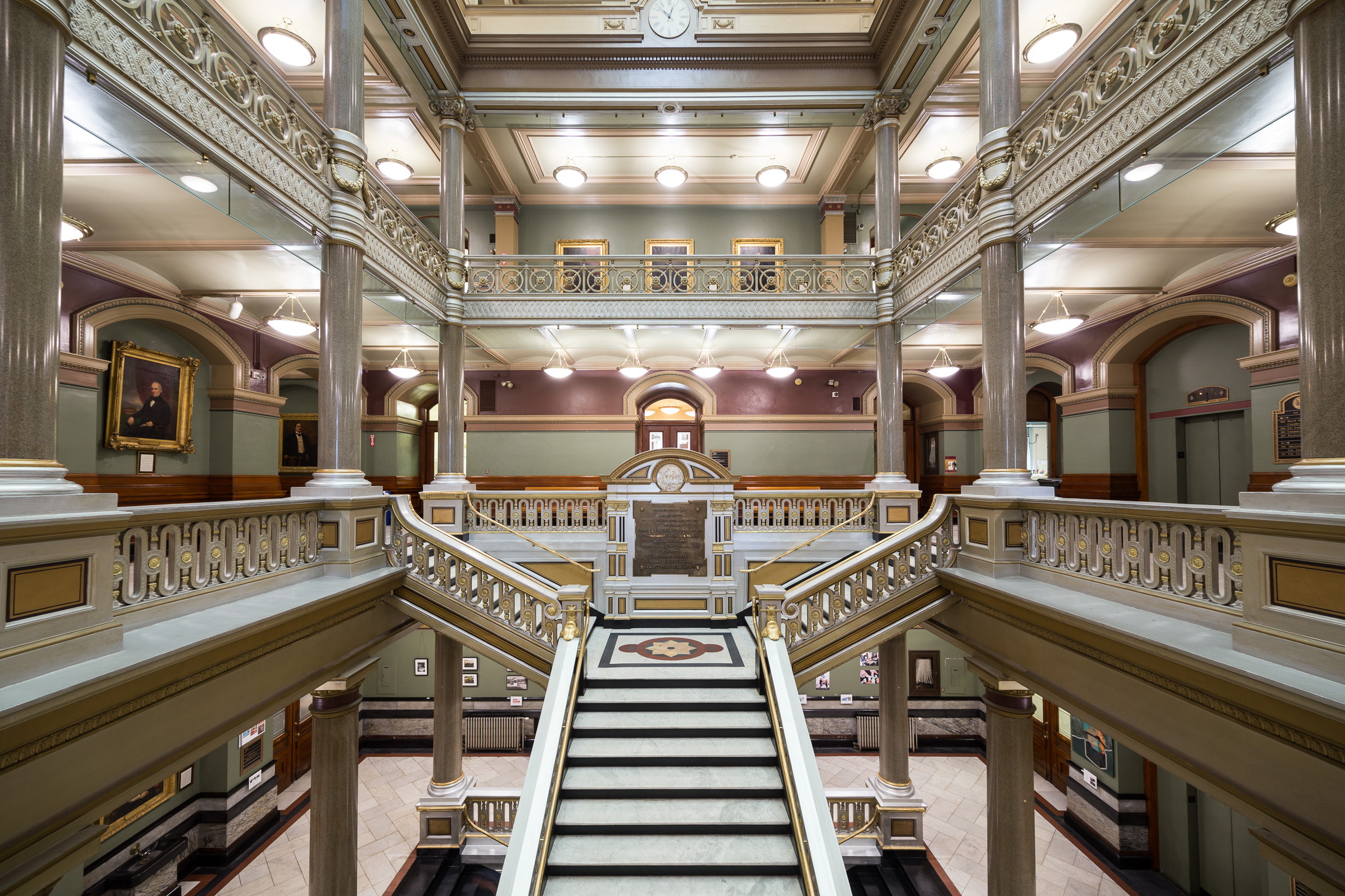
Atrium of Providence City Hall

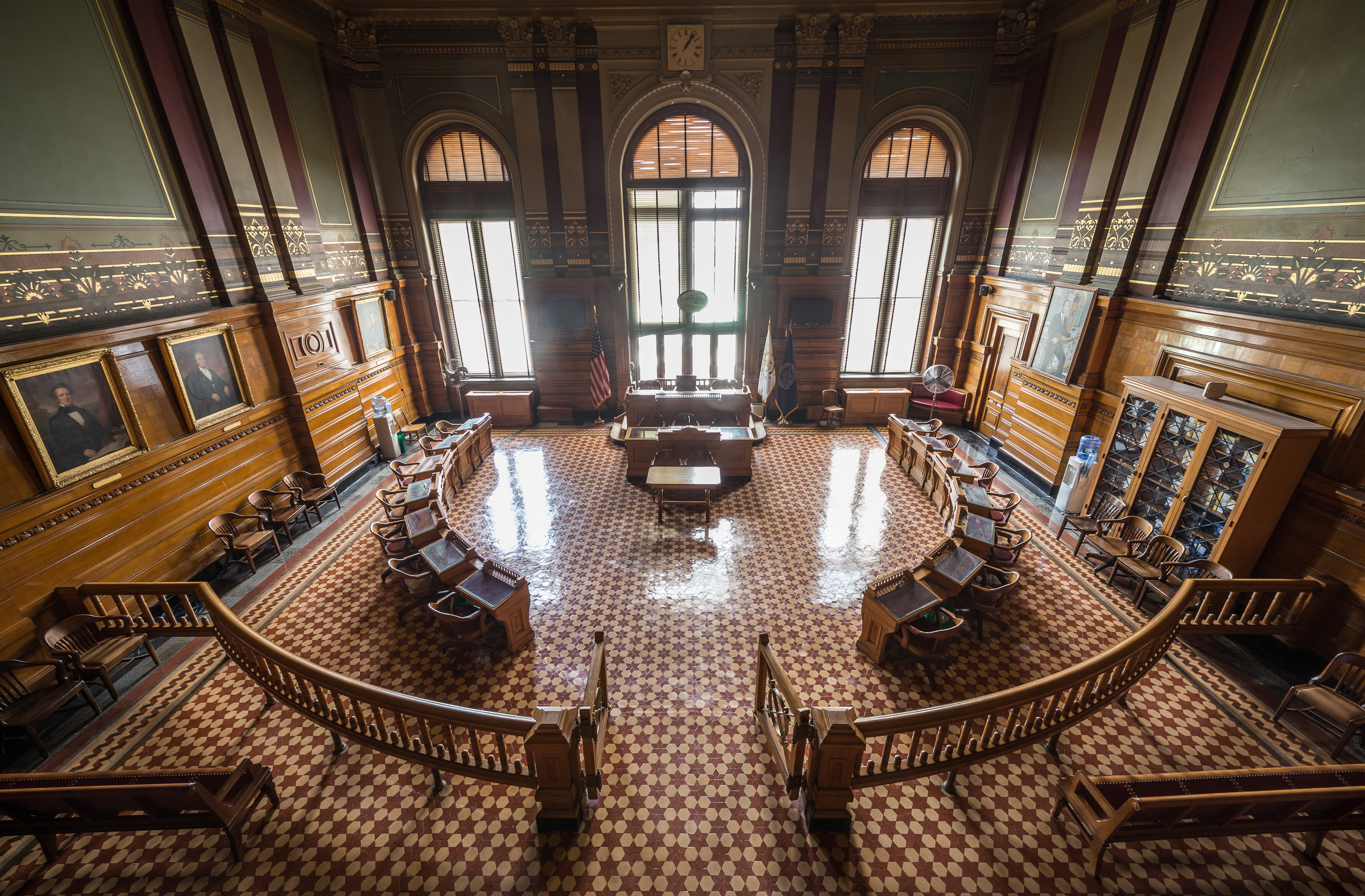
City Council chambers

=== "Our Municipal Palace" ===
An open call for design led to twenty one submissions, and four finalists. Samuel J. F. Thayer's "Blue Wafer" design was chosen, and he was paid $1000.00USD. The building, modified from its original design, would cost the city $1,000,000.USD. The cornerstone was laid on June 24, 1875. Inaugurated on November 14, 1878, The Providence Journal called the building "Our Municipal Palace."

President Teddy Roosevelt spoke on the City Hall steps on August 23, 1902, and John F. Kennedy spoke on November 7, 1960, just before he was elected president. In 2000, Friedrich St. Florian designed outdoor plaques for the building. Haven Brothers Diner, a Rhode Island landmark, is a mobile cafe situated east of City Hall every evening.

In 1975, after concerns began to grow about possible demolition, Mayor Buddy Cianci instigated a full restoration and rehabilitation of the deteriorating building under the guidance of historian and preservationist Antoinette Downing, Frank Mauran III and Irving B. Haynes. The project was completed in the 1990s.

== Architectural details ==
"The building's construction is of iron and brick, faced with Westerly granite on the Dorrance and Washington Street sides and New Hampshire granite on the other two sides. The sidewalks are granite blocks, 5 to 6 feet wide and 18 to 20 feet long. The entire structure was built on an artificial foundation set atop 3,128 pilings driven deep into the underlying hardpan."

"Four coal-fired boilers of 50 horsepower each provided heat for the building. The boilers also supplied energy to operate a water-powered elevator, capable of carrying up to 50 passengers at one time. The elevator was built with electric bells at each landing so that it could be summoned to the desired floor."

In the pre-electricity age, "to keep clocks accurate and uniform, a central control mechanism was installed. It operated in a fashion similar to a grandfather clock, and each morning would be wound up by the janitor. It sent battery powered signals to other clocks in the building. Although the building was wired for electricity shortly after its construction, the clock mechanism remains in place and can be seen in the fifth floor Archives."

"The original main floor included a reception room and the office for the City Messenger. His office contained an elaborate array of communication devices, 50 speaking tubes, 50 electric bells and 50 annunciators which connected to all departments. Next to the Messenger's Office was an ornate reception room, 23 feet by 33 feet, with large mirrors hung at each end of the room. The walls were finished in mahogany and stamped leather."

The fifth floor living quarters for the janitor and his family included a kitchen, parlor, two bedrooms and a bath. The remainder of the fifth floor was used by the City Engineer and for storage. The upper levels of the building are within a high, convex, mansard slate roof that rises above the parallel-eaved parapet. Fashioned into the mansard dome are ornamental bulls-eye dormers.

The mansard roof area is reached by an iron stairway from the fifth floor where, originally, large batteries were stored to generate electricity for the city-wide fire alarm system and for the operation of the clocks and bells in the building. Another flight of stairs led to a higher area in the mansard dome which was also used for storage."

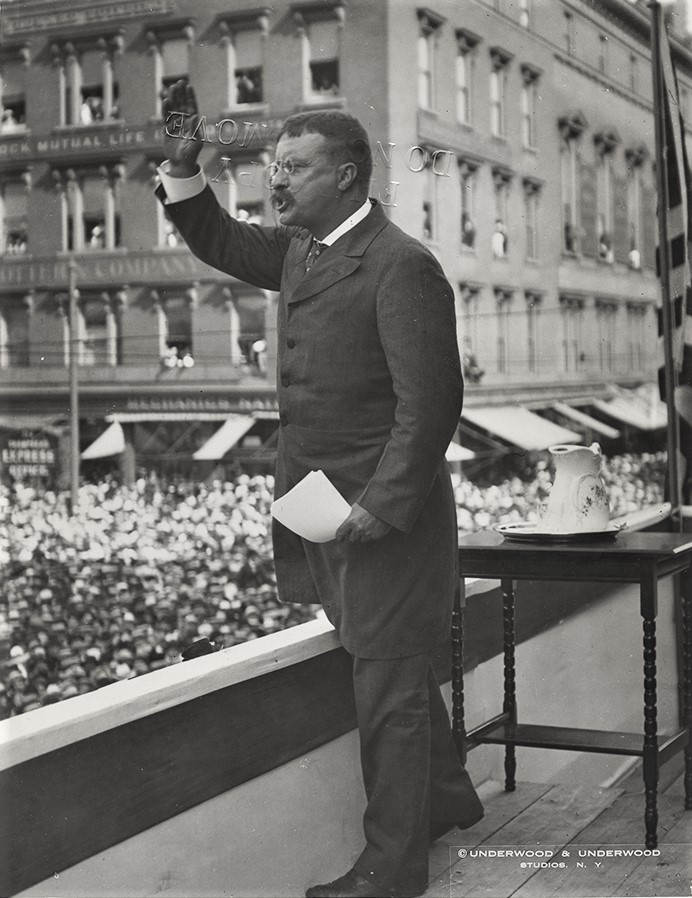
President Theodore Roosevelt speaking on the steps of City Hall

== Notable events ==
=== Famous speeches from the steps ===
Because of its central location with vast open space before it, City Hall has been the scene of a number of speeches by visiting dignitaries.

- One of the features of the tremendous industrial development of the last generation has been the very great increase in private, and especially in corporate, fortunes. ... It is not true that the poor have grown poorer; but some of the rich have grown so very much richer that, where multitudes of men are herded together in a limited space, the contrast strikes the onlooker as more violent than formerly.
  On the whole, our people earn more and live better than ever before, and the progress of which we are so proud could not have taken place had it not been for the up building of industrial centers, such as this in which I am speaking. But together with the good there has come a measure of evil.… Under present-day conditions it is as necessary to have corporations in the business world as it is to have organizations, unions, among wage-workers. We have a right to ask in each case only this: that good, and not harm, shall follow.
  - Theodore Roosevelt (Republican President) "Trust" speech from steps of Providence City Hall toward crowd assembled on Kennedy Plaza – August 23, 1902
- On other occasions, in other years, this country has elected Republican Presidents and Democratic Presidents. They do it when they make a decision that that party and that candidate will serve a great national purpose. In my judgment and the responsibility ultimately is yours, in my judgment the United States will be best served by a candidate and a party who recognizes the basic issues of our time, and that is that this country has to go back to work again.
  - John F. Kennedy (Democratic candidate for President) speech from steps of Providence City Hall toward crowd assembled on Kennedy Plaza

=== Public wakes ===
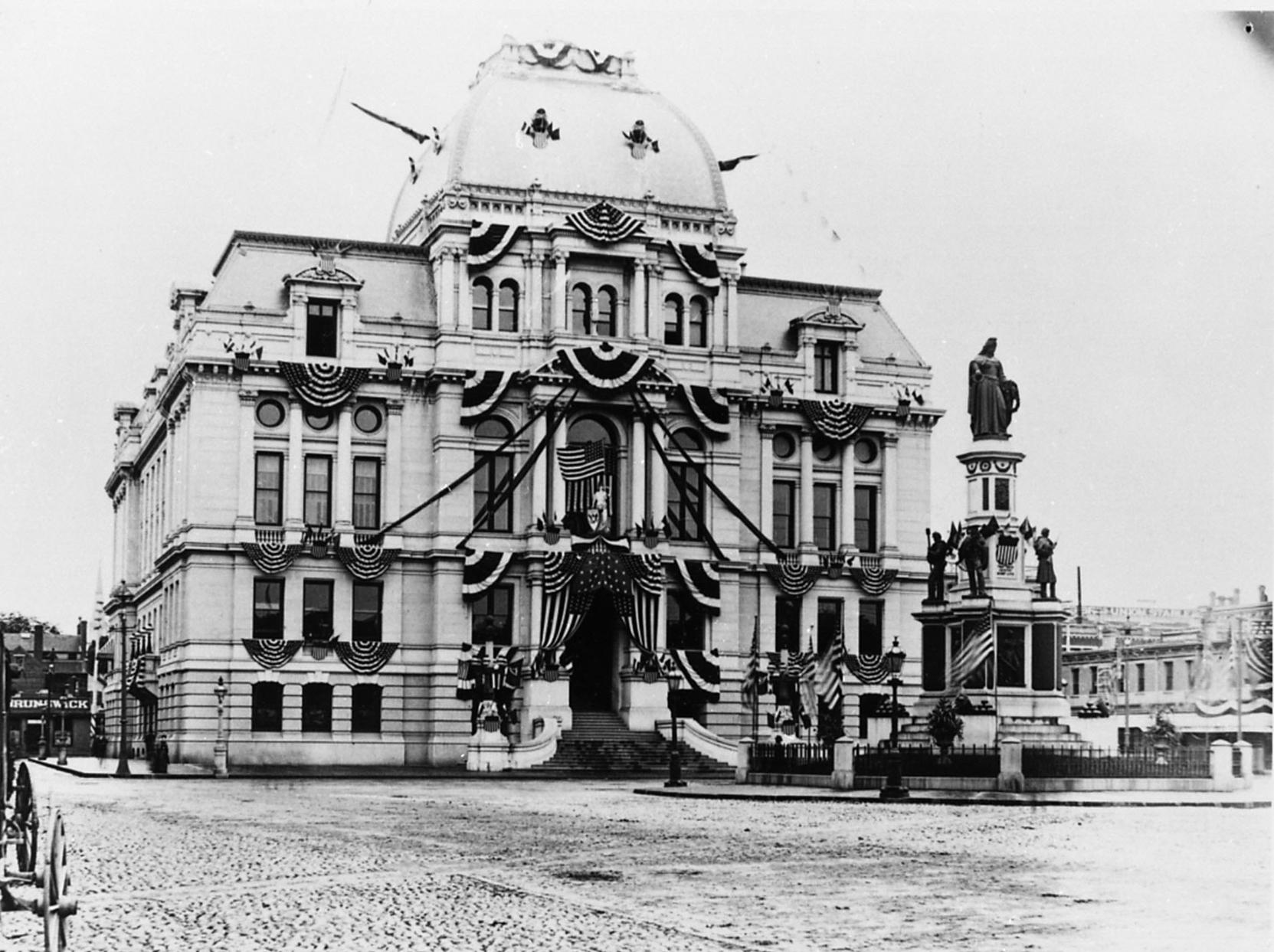
City Hall decorated for Doyle's public wake

- In September 1881, the body of General, Governor, and Senator Ambrose Burnside lay in state before services at First Congregational Church.
- In June 1886, the body of mayor Thomas Doyle lay in state before services at First Congregational Church.
- In February 2016, the body of mayor Buddy Cianci lay in state for two days in half-open casket before services at the Cathedral of Saints Peter and Paul.

== Images ==
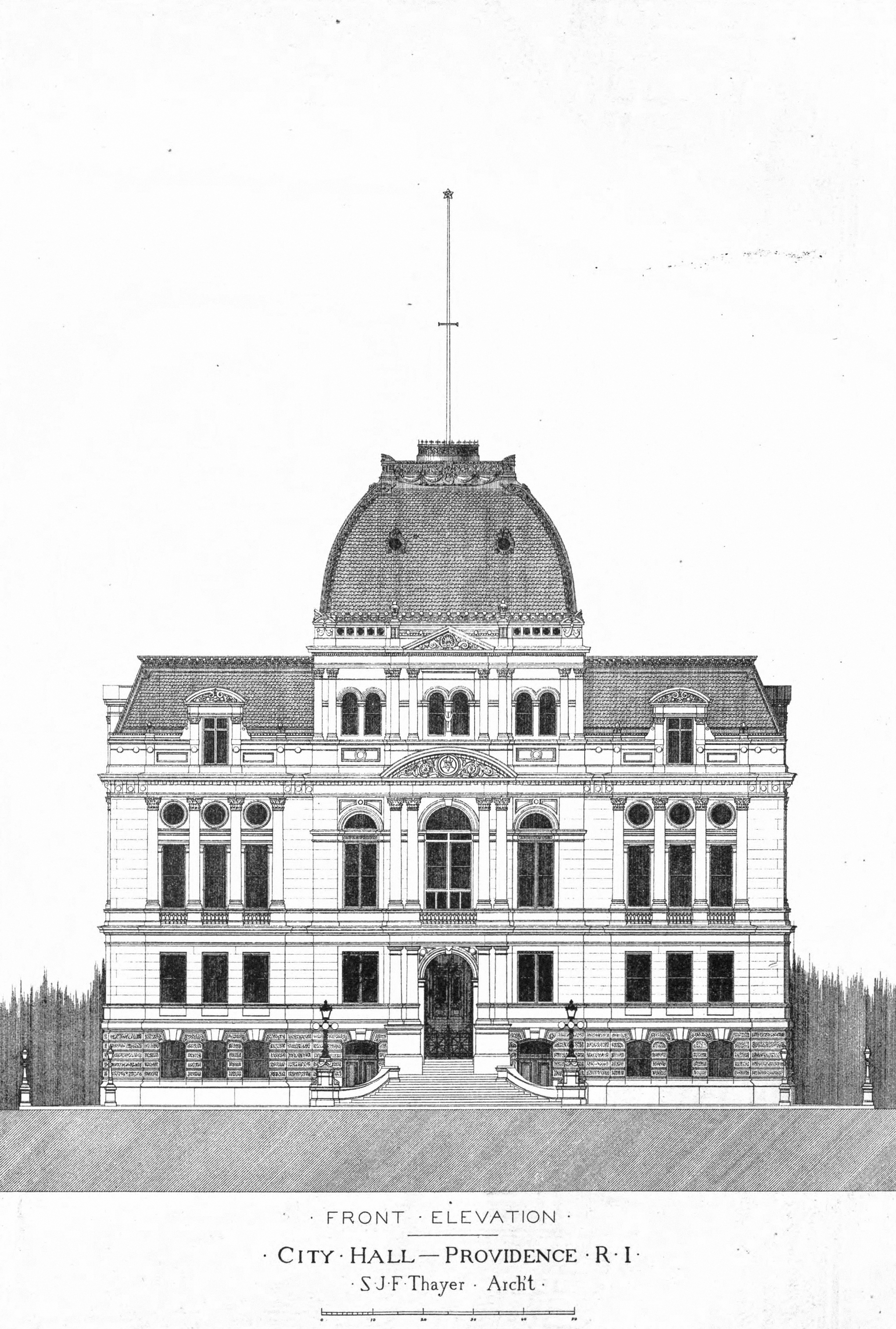
A front elevation of the building published in 1878

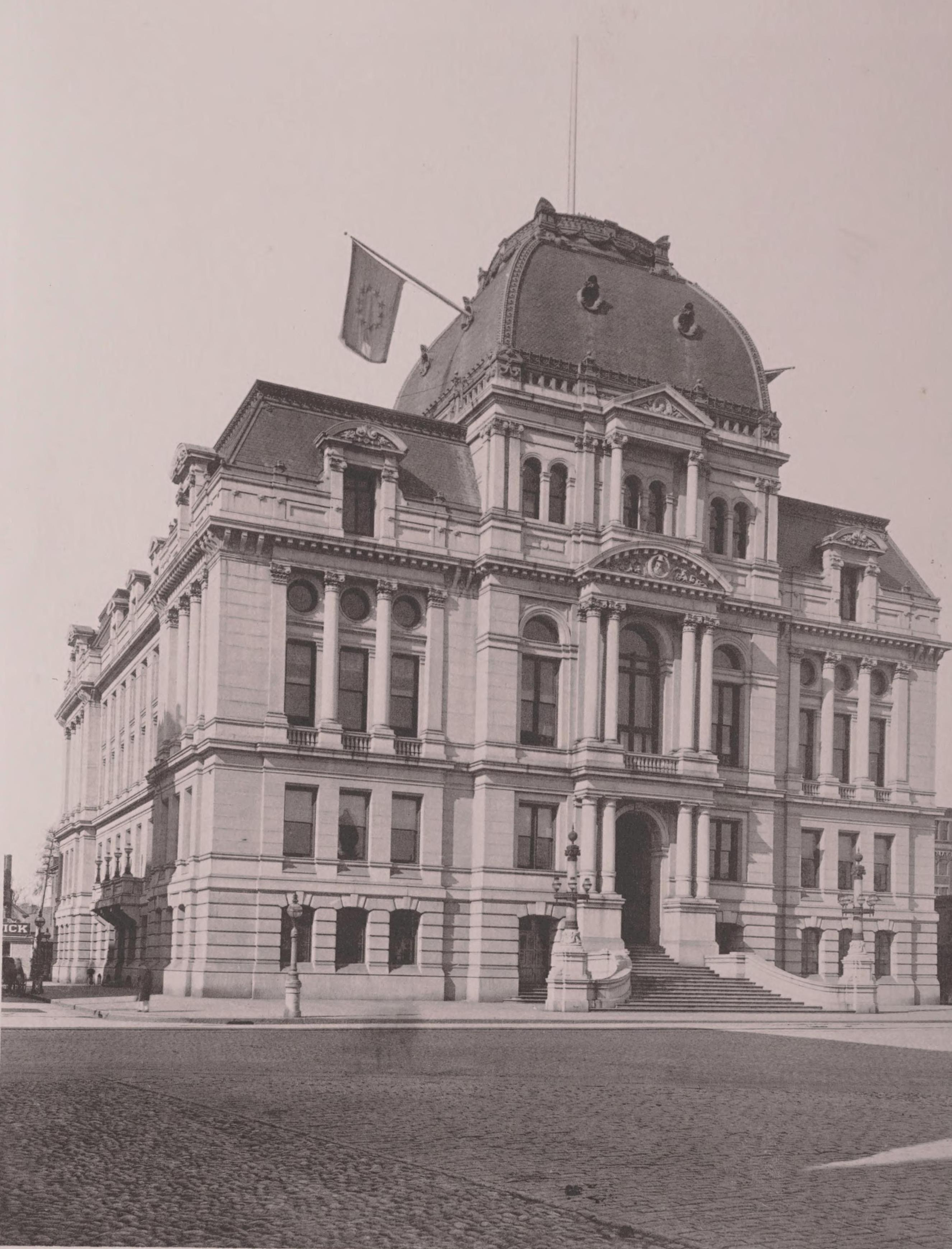
A photograph of the building published in 1891

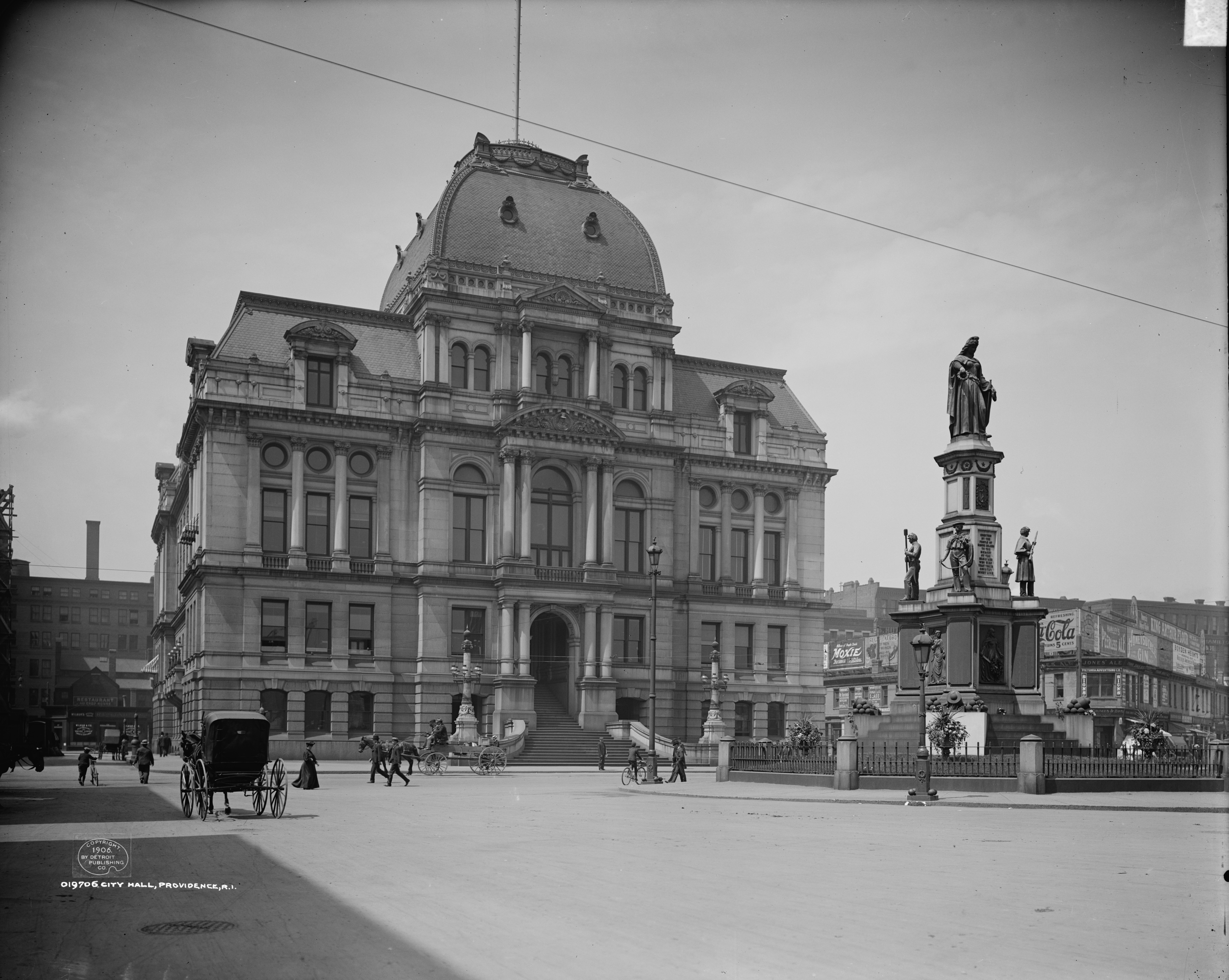
The building, c. 1906

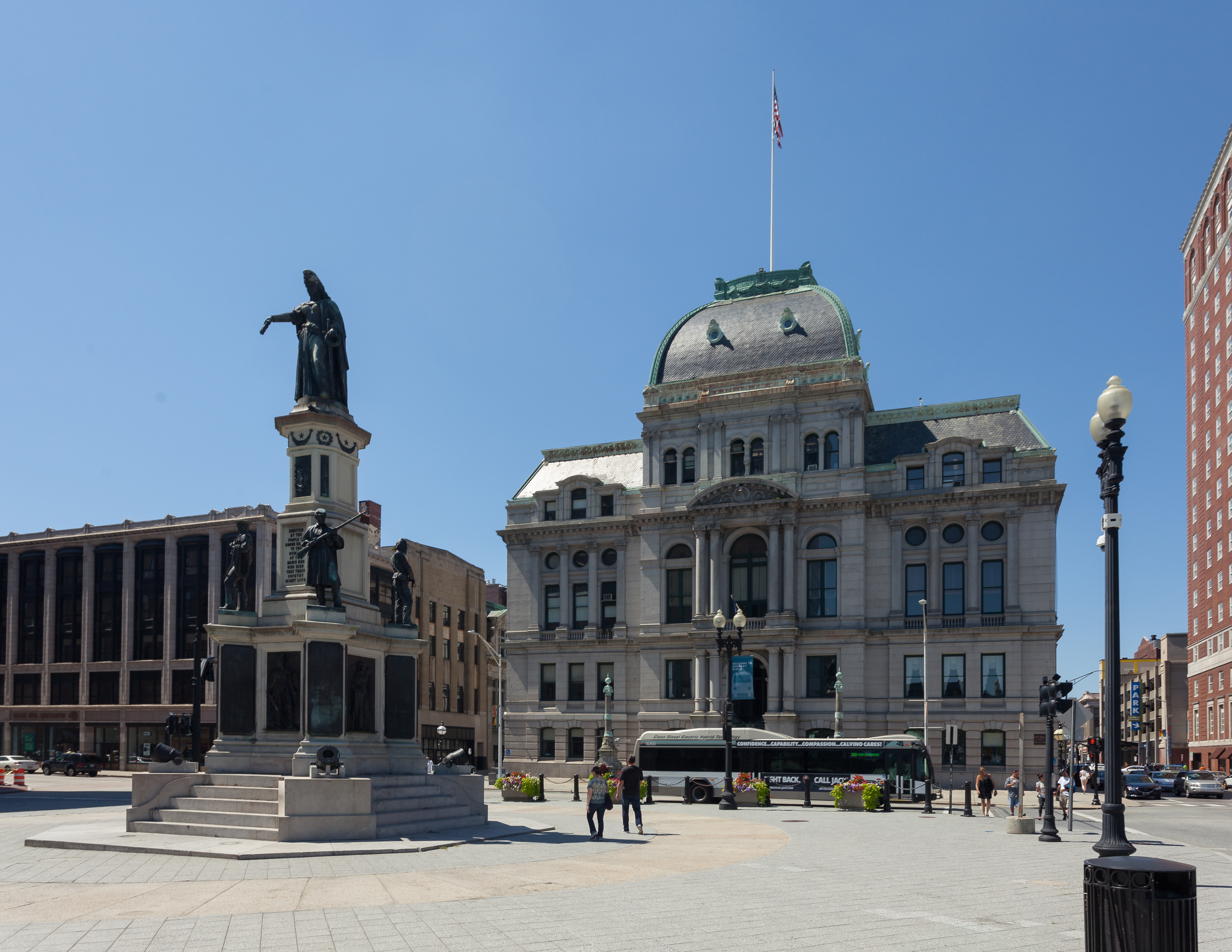
City Hall in 2017

== See also ==
- National Register of Historic Places listings in Providence, Rhode Island
- Old City Hall (Boston)
