= Irving B. Haynes =

American architect and preservationist (1927–2005)

- Born: January 14, 1927; Waterville, Maine
- Died: August 27, 2005 (aged 78); Lincoln, Rhode Island
- Occupation: Architect

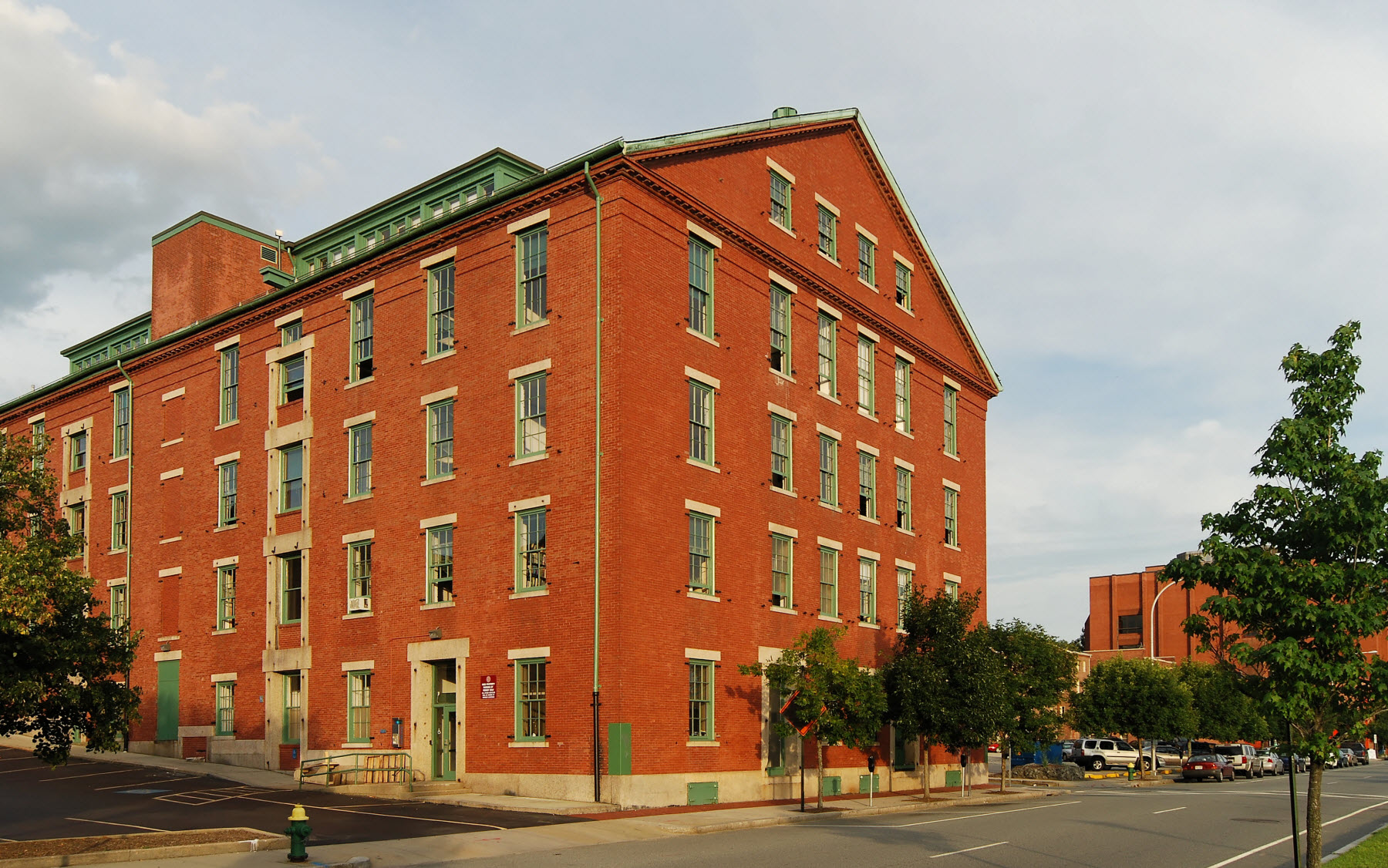
The Bayard Ewing Building of the Rhode Island School of Design, rebuilt for the architecture school in 1978.

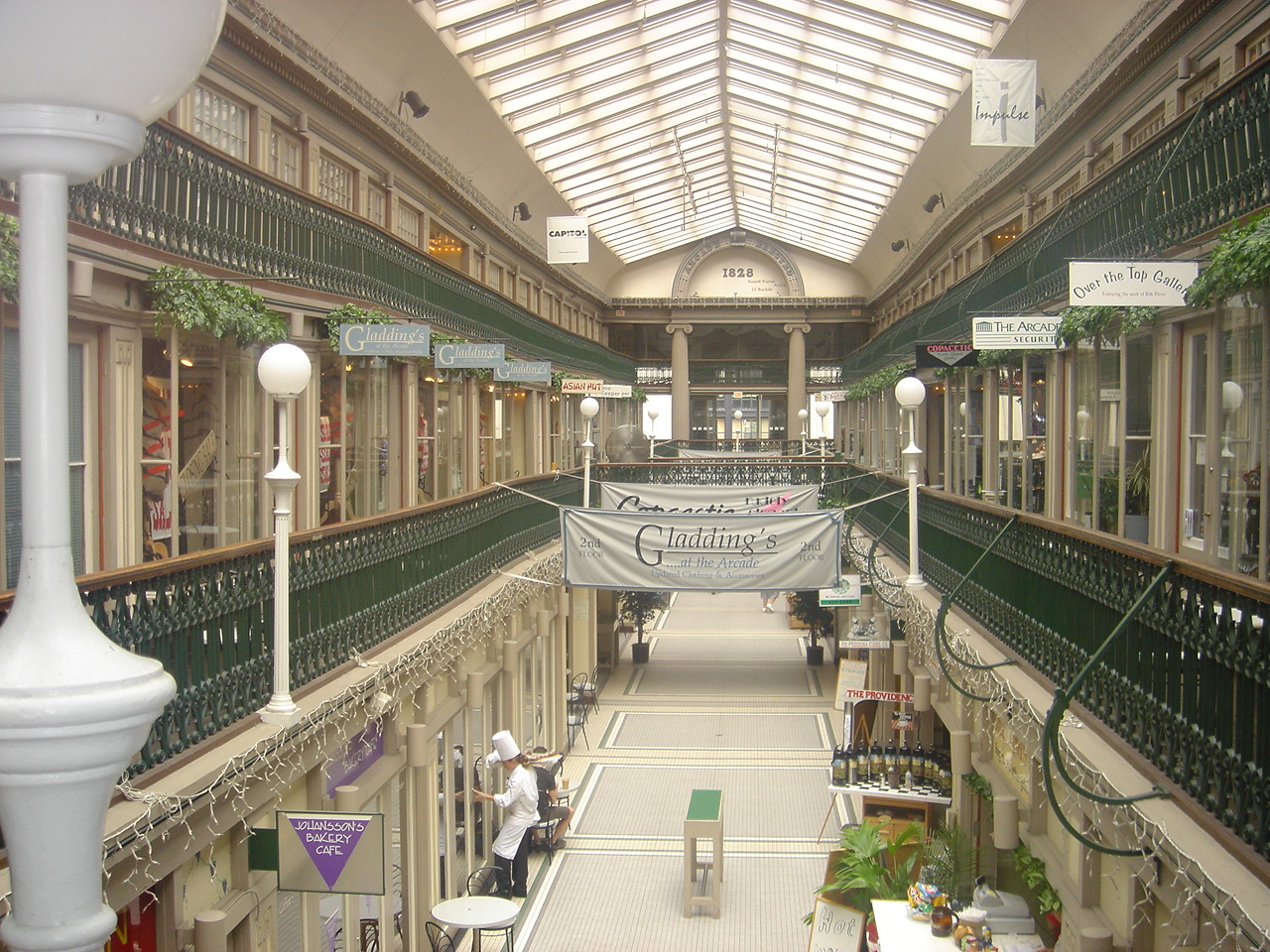
Haynes' version of the Westminster Arcade, completed in 1980, has been largely replaced in a second renovation.

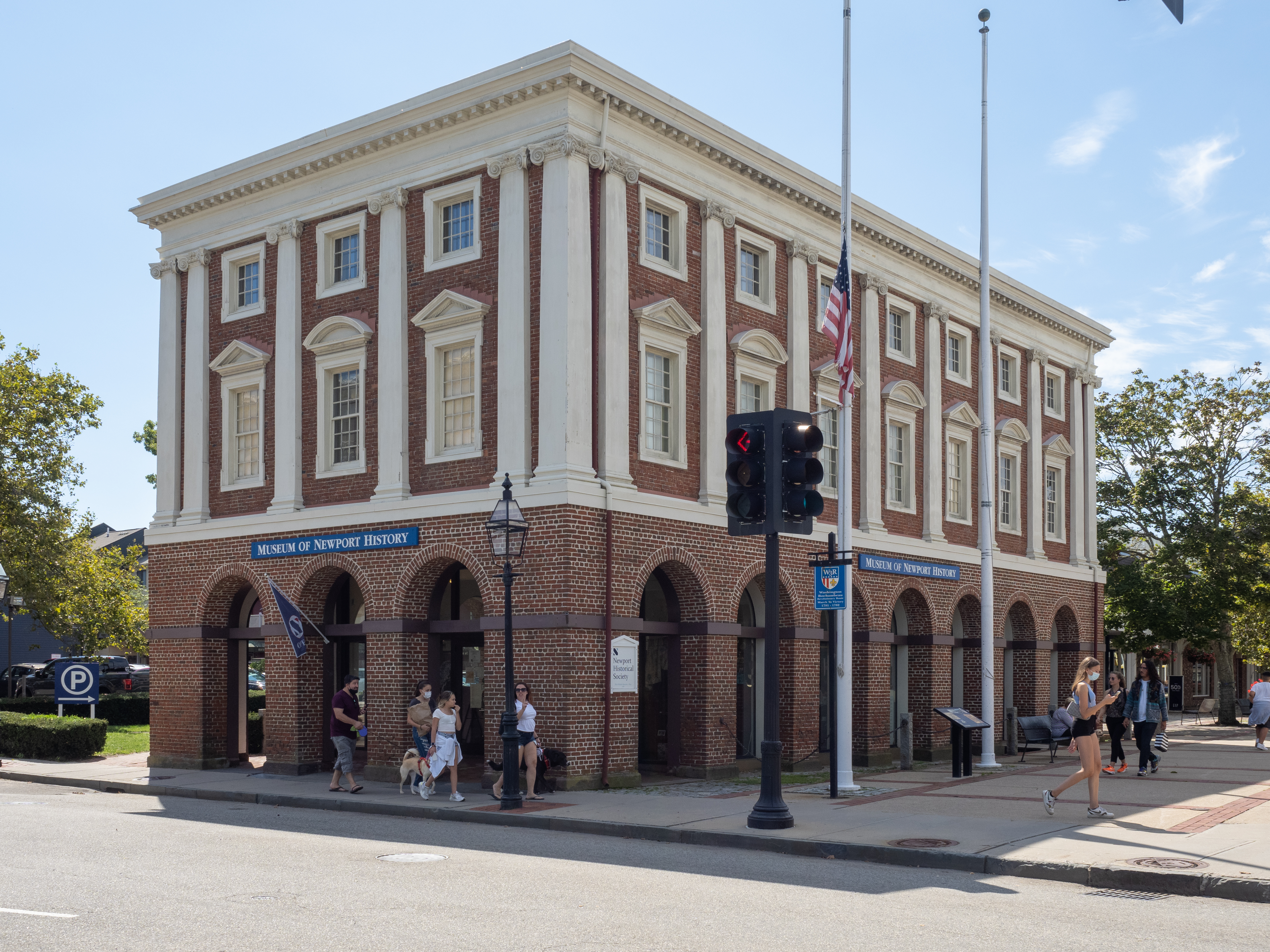
Brick Market in Newport, restored and remodeled by Haynes in 1993 for use as the Museum of Newport History.

Irving B. Haynes FAIA (January 14, 1927 – August 27, 2005) was an American architect and preservationist. He practiced architecture in Pawtucket and Providence, Rhode Island from 1961 to 1994 and taught at the Rhode Island School of Design from 1973 to 2005.

== Life and career ==
Irving Bogle Haynes was born on January 14, 1927, in Waterville, Maine. He was educated at Colby College before transferring to the Rhode Island School of Design (RISD), graduating with a BFA in 1951 and a BS in architecture in 1954. He worked for architects Robinson, Green & Beretta from 1954 to 1957 and for Harkness & Geddes from 1957 to 1958 before joining the Pawtucket firm of Monahan, Meikle & Johnson. After the retirements of Monahan and Meikle, in 1961 Haynes became a partner in the reorganized Johnson & Haynes. When Johnson retired from practice in 1968 Haynes succeeded to the business, and moved it to Providence in 1970. The business was reorganized as Irving B. Haynes & Associates in 1978 with the addition of Cornelis de Boer, and as Haynes/de Boer Associates in 1994 when Haynes retired from practice.

Haynes became known both as an architect and preservationist early in his career. In the 1960s he was responsible for some of the most outstanding new works in urban renewal areas in Pawtucket and Providence and was responsible for the reconstruction and restoration of the First Unitarian Church of Providence following a devastating fire. Later he restored Providence City Hall and the Westminster Arcade and in 1981, along with William D. Warner and Friedrich St. Florian, Haynes devised the original scheme for Waterplace Park, later executed by Warner. Haynes joined the American Institute of Architects in 1962 and was elected a Fellow in 1982.

In 1973 Haynes joined the RISD faculty, teaching foundation studies. In 1980 he was promoted to assistant professor and after his retirement from practice focused on his teaching. He became a full professor in 1997 and retired in 2005, shortly before his death.

== Personal life ==
By 1960, painting was a large part of Haynes' life, and would remain so until his death. He was inspired primarily by contemporary European art movements. After his death his work was exhibited at the Rhode Island School of Design Museum and the Newport Art Museum, and several of his paintings are in the collection of the former.

Haynes married twice, first to Helen Day, with whom he had six children, and second to Jane Ingle. He died August 27, 2005, at home in Lincoln, Rhode Island after a long illness.

== Architectural works ==
Architectural and preservation works completed by Johnson & Haynes, Irving B. Haynes and Irving B. Haynes & Associates include:

- Olney Street Baptist Church, 100 Olney St, Providence, Rhode Island (1962–63)
- Pawtucket Institution for Savings–Pawtucket Trust Company Building, 286 Main St, Pawtucket, Rhode Island (1963)
- Restoration of the First Unitarian Church, 1 Benevolent St, Providence, Rhode Island (1966–67)
- Blackstone Valley Electric Company Building, 150 Main St, Pawtucket, Rhode Island (1968)
- Kathleen McBride house, 5 Vincent St, Providence, Rhode Island (1971–72)
- Ewing Multicultural Center, Rhode Island School of Design, Providence, Rhode Island (1972)
- Restoration of the United Congregational Church, 1 Commons, Little Compton, Rhode Island (1974)
- Lime Rock Baptist Church, 1075 Great Rd, Lincoln, Rhode Island (1975)
- Conversion of the Bayard Ewing Building, Rhode Island School of Design, Providence, Rhode Island (1978)
- Restoration of the Joseph Haile House, 106 George St, Providence, Rhode Island (1978–80)
- Restoration of Providence City Hall, 25 Dorrance St, Providence, Rhode Island (1978–)
- Restoration of the Westminster Arcade, 65 Weybosset St, Providence, Rhode Island (1980)
- Repairs to the Providence Art Club, 10 Thomas St, Providence, Rhode Island (1981–82)
- Restoration of the Nightingale–Brown House, 357 Benefit St, Providence, Rhode Island (1985–93)
- Restoration of Trinity Church, 1 Queen Anne Sq, Newport, Rhode Island (1985–87)
- Armory Revival houses, 7 Gilbert and 23 and 25 Hammond St, Providence, Rhode Island (1987)
- Lincoln Center, 132 Old River Rd, Lincoln, Rhode Island (1988)
- Restoration of Brick Market, 127 Thames St, Newport, Rhode Island (1993)
