= Dr. Charles Cotton House =

Historic house in Rhode Island, United States

- U.S. National Register of Historic Places
- U.S. National Historic Landmark District – Contributing property
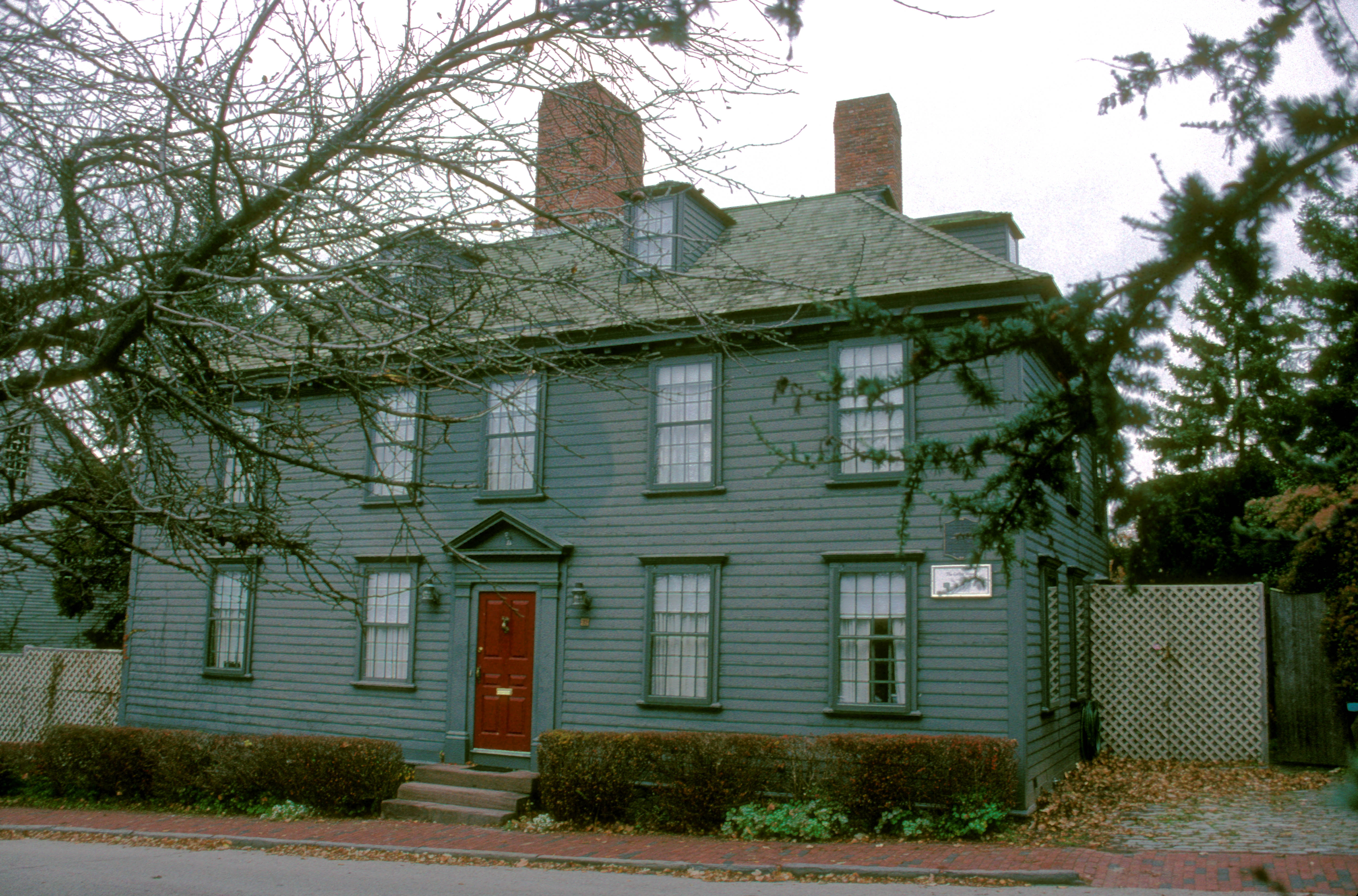

- Location within Rhode Island Location within the United States
- Location: Newport, Rhode Island
- Coordinates: 41°29′18″N 71°18′53″W
- Area: Less than one acre
- Part of: Newport Historic District (ID68000001)
- NRHP reference No.: 72000026

Significant dates
- Added to NRHP: January 13, 1972
- Designated NHLDCP: November 24, 1968

The Dr. Charles Cotton House is an historic house at 5 Cotton Court in Newport, Rhode Island. It is one of the city's oldest houses.

It is a 2 1/2-story wood-frame structure, five bays wide, with a large central chimney and a hipped roof. The original portion of the house was built around 1720 with large Georgian style additions in the 18th century and modifications in the nineteenth century.

Dr. Charles Cotton, a great-grandson of Josiah Cotton and surgeon aboard the USS Constitution, owned the house in the early 19th century and gave the house its current name. By 1974, it had been in the Cotton family for 157 years. Around this time, the family decided to sell various properties they held throughout the city, including this home, and The Newport Redevelopment Agency purchased the house. The Newport Restoration Foundation acquired the house as part of an exchange of land with the City. The Foundation moved the house in 1977 from its original location across the adjoining parking lot. The house was restored from 1979 to 1980. The site added to the National Register of Historic Places in 1979.

== See also ==
- National Register of Historic Places listings in Newport County, Rhode Island

== References and external links ==
- Newport Restoration Foundation information
