= Josiah Cotton =

American missionary, justice, and civil magistrate (1679/80–1756)

Justice of the Court of Common Pleas
- In office ?

Register of Deeds, Plymouth County
- In office ?

Civil magistrate of Plymouth Colony
- In office ?

Personal details
- Born: 1680 Plymouth, Massachusetts
- Died: 1756 (aged 75–76)
- Education: Harvard College
- Occupation: Indian missionary; schoolmaster; civil magistrate
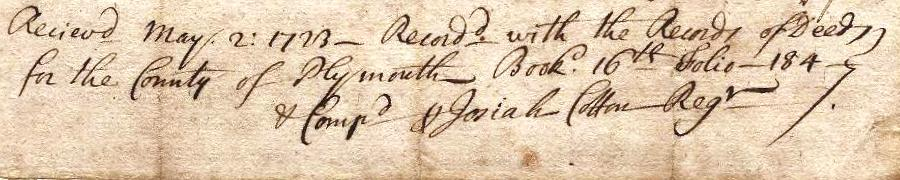
- Signature

Josiah Cotton (1679/80–1756) was an American missionary, Justice of the Court of Common Pleas, Register of Deeds and Plymouth Colony civil magistrate. He was a grandson of John Cotton (1585–1652) and a cousin of Cotton Mather. His father John Cotton Jr. was a pastor of the First Church in Plymouth Colony from 1669 to 1697.

Cotton was the maternal grandfather of William Cushing, one of the first six Supreme Court justices appointed by George Washington and also the longest served of those original jurists.

== Early life and education ==
Born in 1680 in Plymouth, Massachusetts, Josiah Cotton was the son of Jane (née Rossiter) and John Cotton Jr. (1639–1699), a prominent Indian missionary and son of John Cotton, a leading Puritan clergyman in New England. His father was the town's fourth minister and the eldest son and namesake of Boston's most venerable pastor and theologian. He had ministered to well-established communities of Native Christians on Martha's Vineyard and Cape Cod. Virtually all of Cotton's uncles, brothers, and cousins pursued successful ministerial callings, while aunts and sisters married eminent country clergymen.

In 1698, Cotton graduated from Harvard College. 1698–1707, he served for several years as schoolmaster in the fishing community of Marblehead before returning to his native Plymouth. In 1707, he married Hannah Sturtevant, the only child of a prosperous Pilgrim family. He also petitioned the New England Company for an appointment.

== Career ==
In 1728 Cotton was made pastor of the First Congregational Society of Providence (now the First Unitarian Church of Providence) and served in the roll until 1747. During his tenure the Society split into two, with the faction that is now the Beneficent Congregational Church siting Cotton's preaching as a contributing factor. Cotton was dismissed as pastor by his request in 1747.

In 1729, Governor Samuel Shute appointed him justice of the peace and quorum. As a civil magistrate, Judge Cotton rose to considerable heights, but in what he called his "Indian Business", the lay missionary labored in the long shadow cast by his father. From the start, however, Cotton's missionary enterprise was vulnerable. Unlike John Eliot, Experience Mayhew, and his own father, he had no settled pastorate. Instead, he spent the majority of this time preaching to isolated Indian families and indentured servants living in the midst of English society.

== Death and legacy ==
Cotton died in 1756, aged 76 years, leaving numerous progeny. His son John Cotton (1712–1789) succeeded his civil duties. Cotton possessed a strong and sound mind, was fervently pious, and was indefatigable in the discharge of all the duties of his various and honorable stations in life. He left a diary, which he began in his youth, soon after he left college, and continued nearly to the time of his decease. It was in the possession of his grandson, Rosseter Cotton, Register of Deeds for the county of Plymouth.

Cotton wrote a supplement to the New England Memorial and "Vocabulary of the Massachusetts (or Natick) Indian language", now in the hands of the Massachusetts Historical Society.

== Descendants ==
- William Cushing (1732–1810, grandson of Cotton, Chief Justice appointed by George Washington-declined),
- John Cotton (1712–1789, son of Cotton, Register of Deeds and Treasurer of Plymouth, MA),
- Col. Theophilus Cotton (1716–1782, son of Cotton),
- Rosseter Cotton (1758–1837, grandson of Cotton, Register of Deeds and Treasurer of Plymouth, MA),
- Dr. Charles Cotton (son of Rosseter Cotton, surgeon aboard the USS Constitution)
