= R. C. N. Monahan =

Canadian-American architect

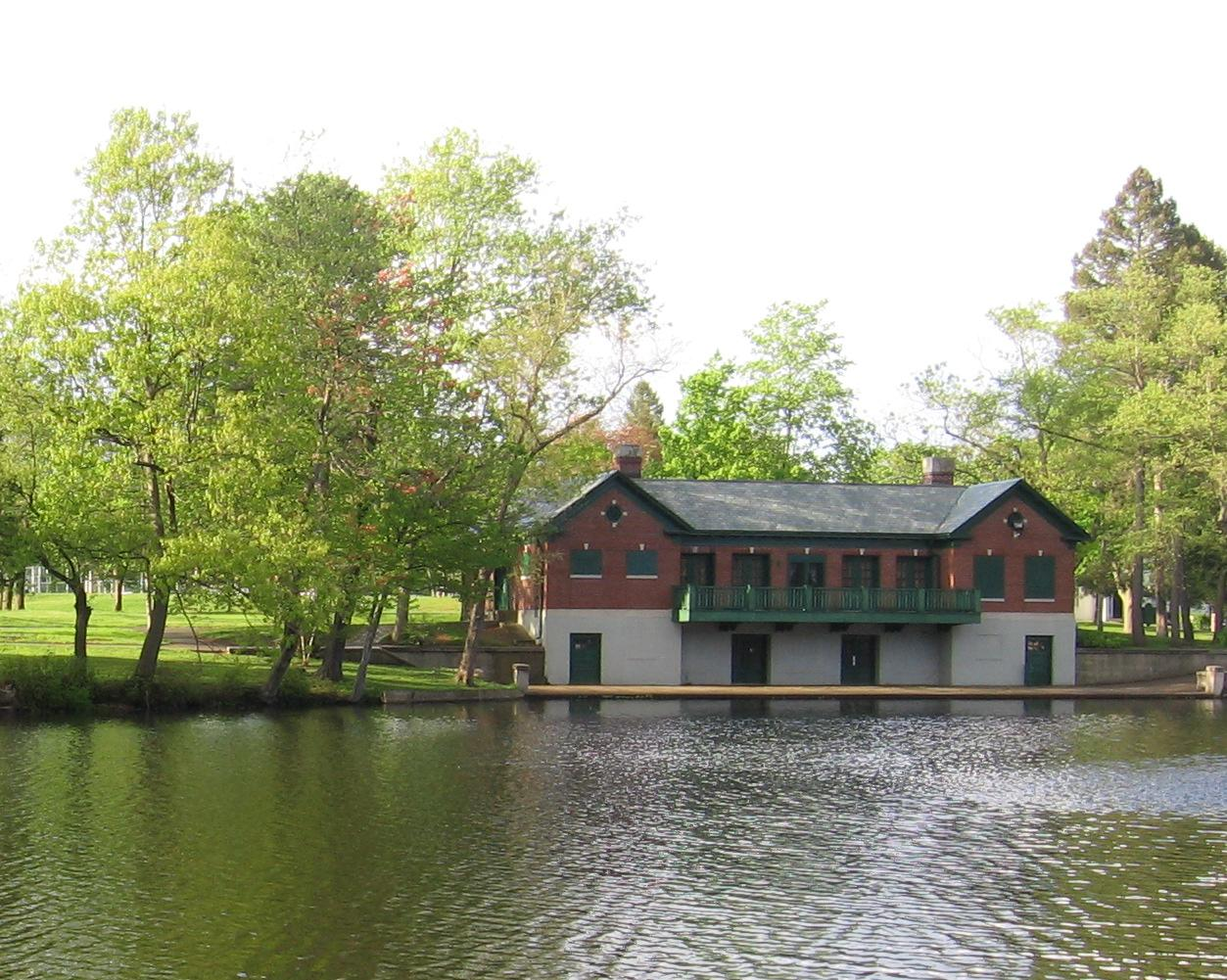
J. C. Potter Casino, Slater Park, Pawtucket, 1917.

Robert Charles Nicholson Monahan (December 1, 1873 – January 29, 1963) was a Canadian-American architect from Pawtucket, Rhode Island.

== Life and career ==
Monahan was born in Hamilton, Ontario, Canada, in 1873. His father, Robert Monahan, was a carpenter. He moved to the United States in 1892 and opened his office in Pawtucket at the turn of the century. Up until 1926, he worked alone until adding Robert R. Meikle as a partner to the newly formed Monahan & Meikle firm. In 1943, Carl F. Johnson was also made a partner, and the firm became Monahan, Meikle & Johnson in 1951. In 1962, Monahan retired, dying the next year. Carl Johnson took over, the firm becoming Johnson & Haynes, with Irving B. Haynes. The firm was dissolved in 1968, and Haynes opened an office in Providence.

== Architectural works ==
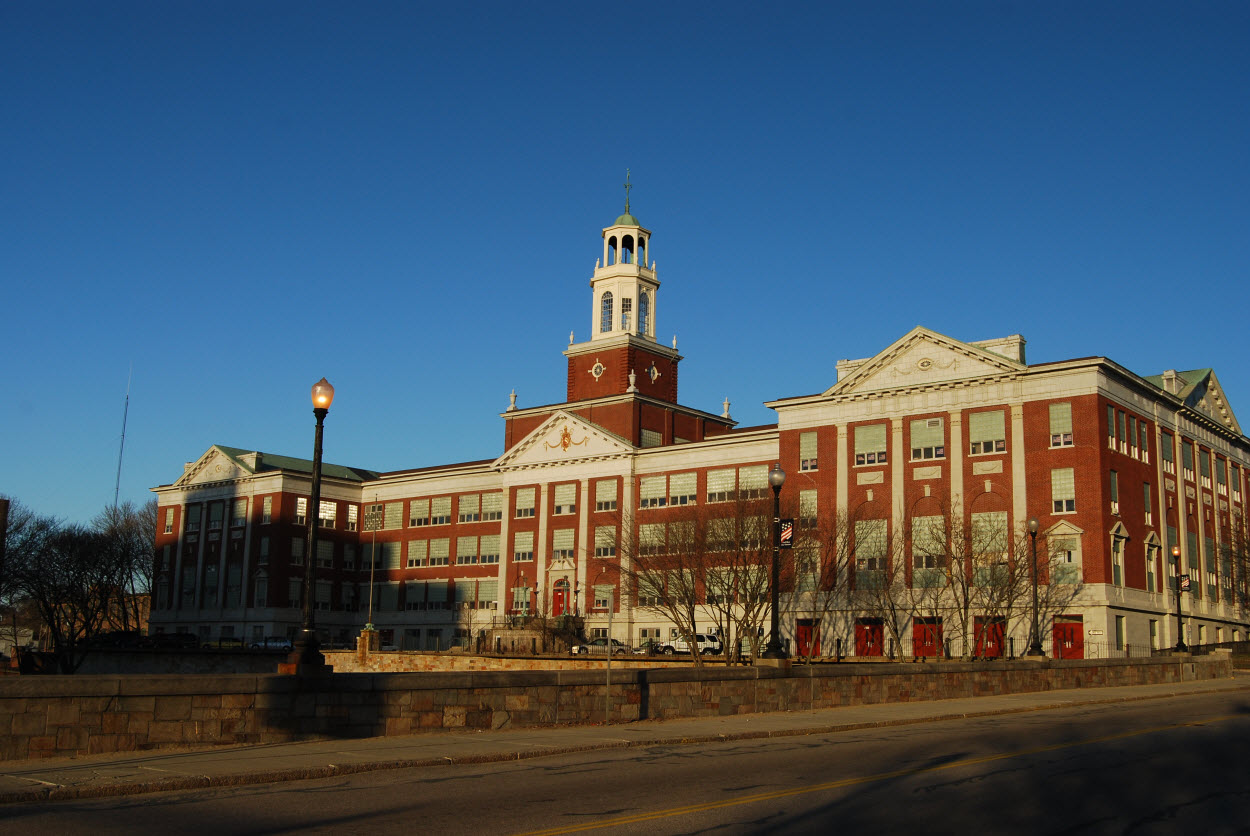
Pawtucket High School, Pawtucket, 1926.

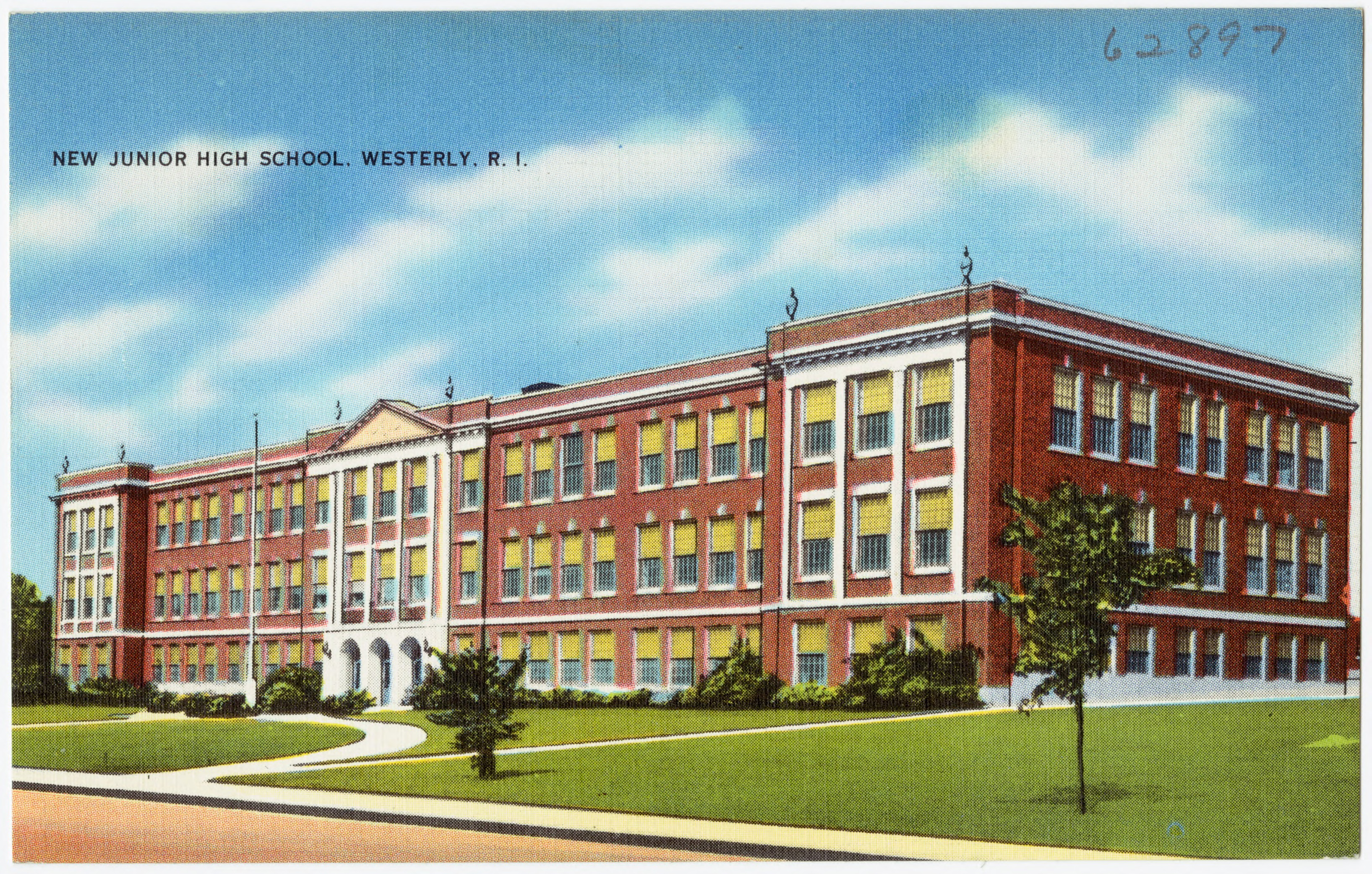
Westerly Jr. High School, Westerly, 1929.

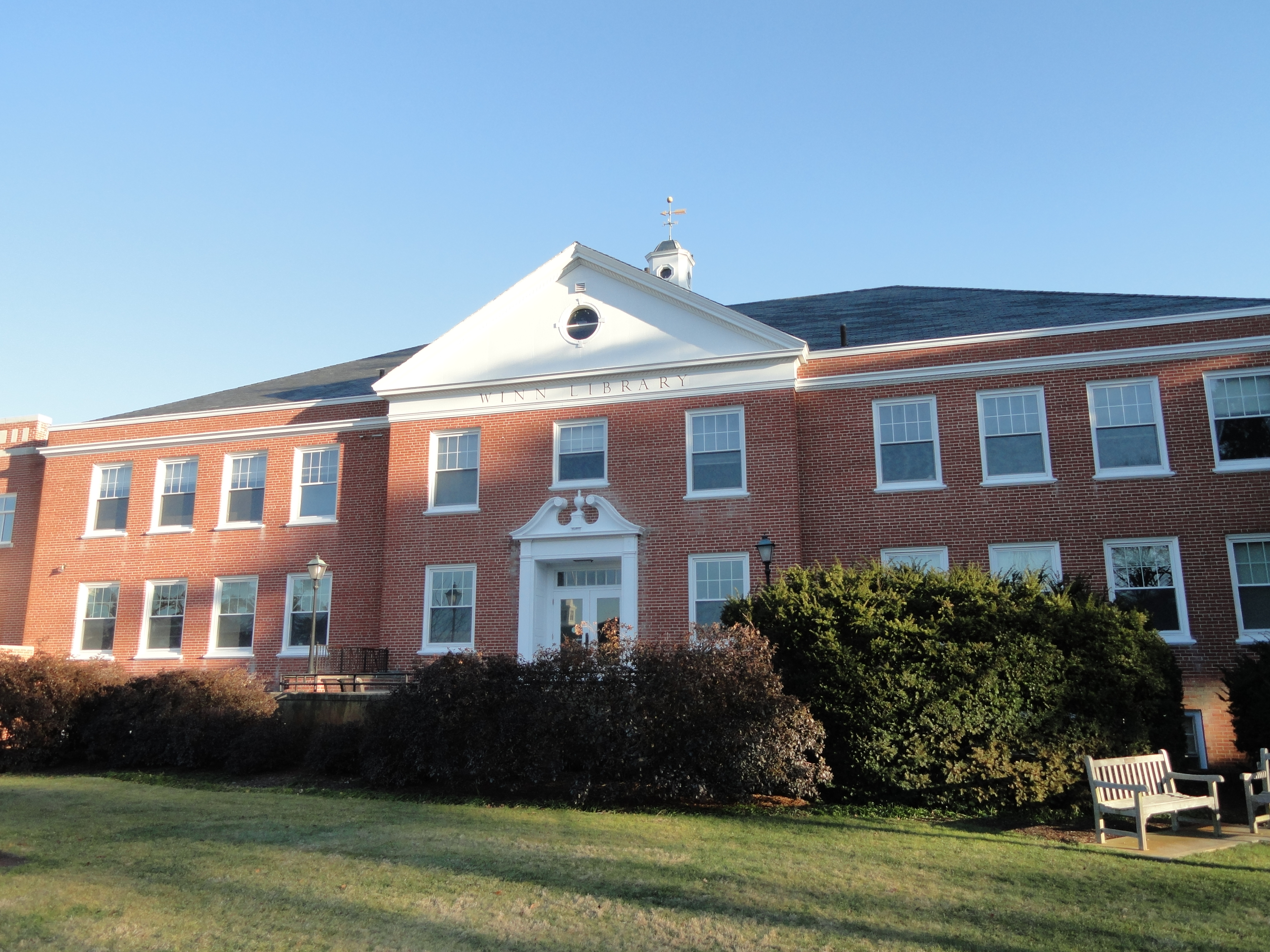
Winn Library, Gordon College, 1954.

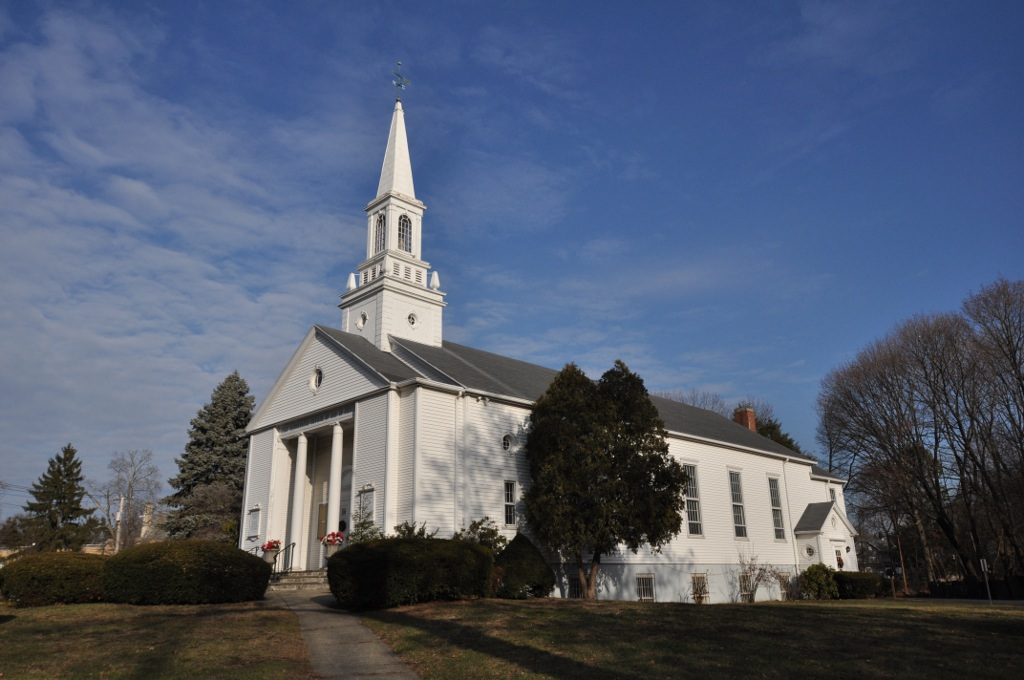
First Church of Christ, Scientist, Bridgeport, 1958.

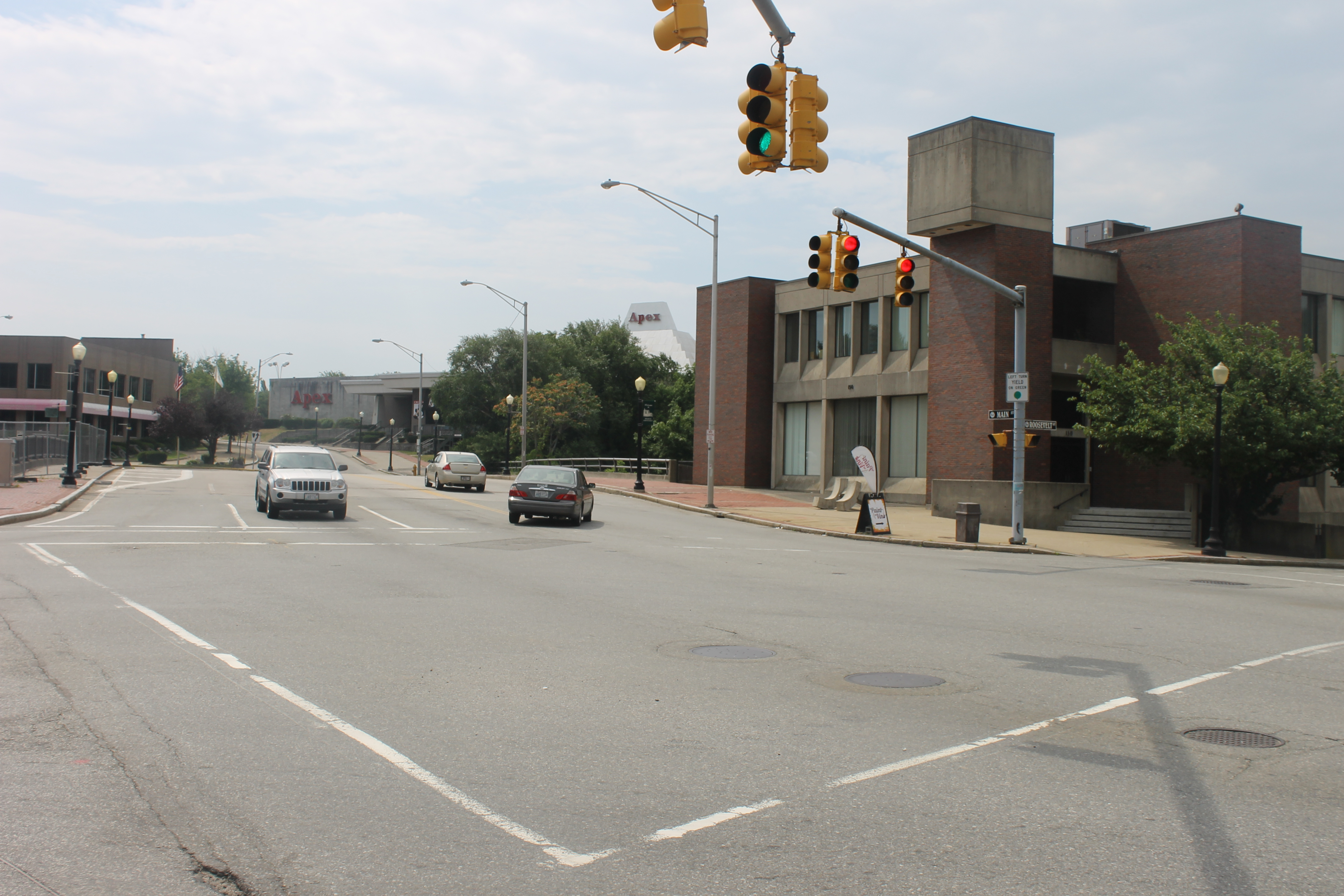
Blackstone Valley Electric Building, Pawtucket, 1968.

=== R. C. N. Monahan, before 1925 ===
- 1901 – Washington School, 901 Washington St., South Attleboro, Massachusetts. Demolished.
- 1903 – Robert C. N. Monahan House, 14 Denver St., Pawtucket, Rhode Island. The architect's own residence.
- 1904 – Darlington School, 466 Cottage St., Pawtucket, Rhode Island. Demolished.
- 1904 – West Side School, 949 Dexter St., Central Falls, Rhode Island. Demolished.
- 1908 – Child Street School, 450 Child St., Warren, Rhode Island. Now home to the Bristol County Water Authority.
- 1909 – Bungalow, Slater Park, Pawtucket, Rhode Island. Demolished.
- 1911 – James C. Potter (Potter-Burns) School, Newport Ave., Pawtucket, Rhode Island.
- 1912 – Gates, Oak Grove Cemetery, Pawtucket, Rhode Island.
- 1912 – South Woodlawn Fire Station, 394 West Ave., Pawtucket, Rhode Island.
- 1915 – Samuel Slater School, Mineral Spring Ave., Pawtucket, Rhode Island.
- 1915 – T. Stewart Little House, 55 Armistice Blvd., Pawtucket, Rhode Island.
- 1915 – Y. W. C. A. Annex, 324 Broad St., Central Falls, Rhode Island. Demolished in 1992.
- 1916 – Nathanael Greene School, Smithfield Ave., Pawtucket, Rhode Island.
- 1916 – William Gillespie Duplex, 96–98 Clay St., Central Falls, Rhode Island.
- 1917 – Bandstand, Slater Park, Pawtucket, Rhode Island.
- 1917 – Darius L. Goff House, 22 Arlington St., Pawtucket, Rhode Island.
- 1917 – J. C. Potter Casino, Slater Park, Pawtucket, Rhode Island.
- 1918 – Frank J. McDuff House, 7 Homestead St., Pawtucket, Rhode Island.
- 1919 – G. Bradford Draper House, 7 Denver St., Pawtucket, Rhode Island.)
- 1922 – Toole Building (Remodeling), 228 Main St., Pawtucket, Rhode Island. Addition of two stories to the former Wheaton Building (1892).
- 1923 – Clubhouse, Pawtucket Country Club, 900 Armistice Blvd., Pawtucket, Rhode Island.
- 1923 – Samuel Slater Jr. High School, Mineral Spring Ave., Pawtucket, Rhode Island. A radical expansion of the original Slater School.

=== Monahan & Meikle, 1925–1951 ===
- 1925 – Pawtucket High School, Exchange St., Pawtucket, Rhode Island.
- 1927 – Hope School, North Rd., Hope, Rhode Island.
- 1929 – T. Stewart Little House, 43 Armistice Blvd., Pawtucket, Rhode Island.
- 1929 – Westerly Jr. High School, Highland Ave., Westerly, Rhode Island.
- 1930 – Hiram W. Emery House, 750 Elmgrove Ave., Providence, Rhode Island.
- 1930 – Lyman B. Goff Jr. High School, Newport Ave., Pawtucket, Rhode Island.
- 1931 – MacColl Building, Memorial Hospital of Rhode Island, 111 Brewster St., Pawtucket, Rhode Island.)
- 1932 – Robert R. Meikle House, 16 Sayles Ave., Pawtucket, Rhode Island. The architect's own residence.
- 1933 – Hopkinton Jr. High School, Thelma Dr., Hope Valley, Rhode Island.
- 1934 – Cranston School, Cranston Ave., Newport, Rhode Island.
- 1935 – Quinn Hall, University of Rhode Island, Kingston, Rhode Island.
- 1936 – Pawtucket Congregational Church (Parish House), 40 Walcott St., Pawtucket, Rhode Island.
- 1936 – Westerly High School, Ward Ave., Westerly, Rhode Island.
- 1946 – Osteopathic Hospital of Rhode Island, 1763 Broad St., Cranston, Rhode Island. Not built.

=== Monahan, Meikle & Johnson, 1951–1962 ===
- 1951 – Richardson Building, Memorial Hospital of Rhode Island, 111 Brewster St., Pawtucket, Rhode Island.
- 1952 – Osteopathic Hospital of Rhode Island (Addition), 1763 Broad St., Cranston, Rhode Island. Demolished.
- 1953 – Westerly Public Water Building, 68 White Rock Rd., Westerly, Rhode Island.
- 1954 – Winn Library, Gordon College, Wenham, Massachusetts.
- 1954 – Wood Hall, Gordon College, Wenham, Massachusetts. Demolished 2006.
- 1955 – Barrington Baptist Church, 25 Old County Rd., Barrington, Rhode Island.
- 1955 – Hillside Covenant Church, 100 Hillside Ave., Naugatuck, Connecticut.
- 1956 – Covenant Congregational Church, 315 Whitwell St., Quincy, Massachusetts.
- 1957 – First Baptist Church (Parish House), 1400 Pawtucket Ave., East Providence, Rhode Island.
- 1958 – First Church of Christ, Scientist, 2271 North Ave., Bridgeport, Connecticut.
- 1959 – Central Congregational Church, 1 Worthen St., Chelmsford, Massachusetts.
- 1959 – First Baptist Church, 91 Cottage St., Pawtucket, Rhode Island.
- 1960 – Trinity Baptist Church, 3 Lund Rd., Nashua, New Hampshire. Altered beyond recognition.

=== Johnson & Haynes, 1962–1968 ===
- 1962 – Olney Street Baptist Church, 100 Olney St., Providence, Rhode Island.
- 1963 – Hopedale Union Evangelical Church, 25 Dutcher St., Hopedale, Massachusetts.
- 1963 – Pawtucket Trust Co. Building, 286 Main St., Pawtucket, Rhode Island.
- 1965 – Swedish Congregational Church Parish House, 455 Arborway, Jamaica Plain, Massachusetts.
- 1965 – Trinity Covenant Church, 7 Clematis Rd., Lexington, Massachusetts.
- 1966 – First Unitarian Church (Restoration), 301 Benefit St., Providence, Rhode Island.
- 1968 – Blackstone Valley Electric Co. Building, 150 Main St., Pawtucket, Rhode Island.
