= First Unitarian Church of Providence =

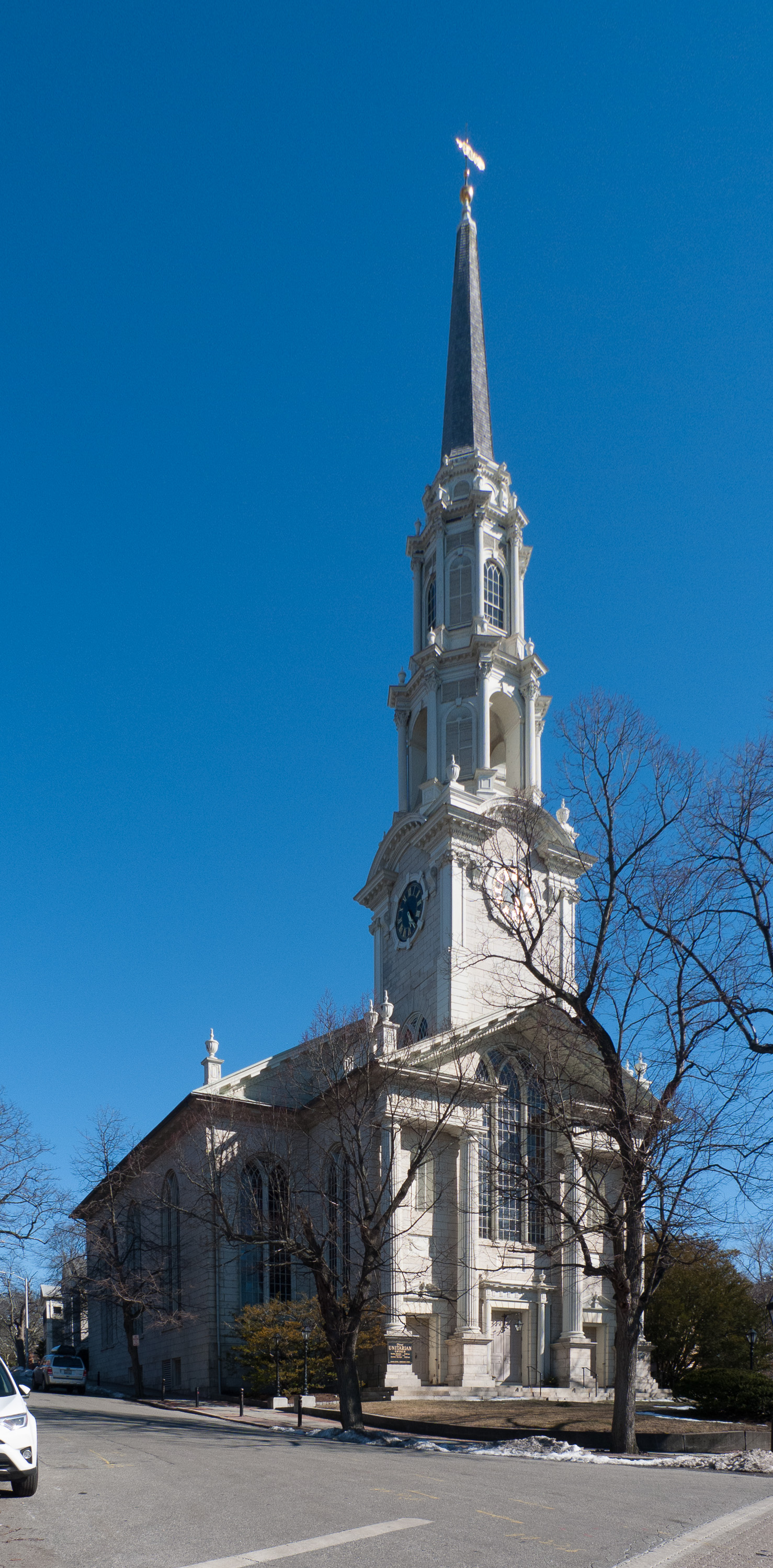

- Location within the state of Rhode Island
- 41°49′27.6″N 71°24′18.4″W
- Location: 1 Benevolent Street, Providence, Rhode Island
- Country: United States
- Denomination: Unitarian Universalist
- Website: www.firstunitarianprov.org

History
- Former name(s): The First Congregational Church, First Congregational Church (Unitarian)

Architecture
- Functional status: Active
- Architect: John Holden Greene
- Style: Colonial
- Completed: 1816
- Construction cost: over $50,000

Specifications
- Height: 189 feet, 11 inches
- Materials: ashlar-laid white stone

First Unitarian Church of Providence is an American Unitarian Universalist congregation located at the corner of Benefit and Benevolent Streets in Providence, Rhode Island. The congregation was founded in 1723, and the current church building was dedicated in 1816. For many years it was known as the First Congregational Church of Providence.

== History ==
The first churches in Providence were Baptist. It wasn't until 1721 that the First Congregational Society was formed, and it erected its first house of worship in 1723. This building was known as the "Old Town House", and stood where the Providence County Courthouse now stands. By 1728, there were nine members of the congregation, led by Josiah Cotton as pastor.

A new, larger building was constructed on the corner of Benefit and Benevolent Streets, where the current church now stands. This building was destroyed by fire on June 14, 1814.

=== Current building ===
The current building was designed by local architect John Holden Greene, who designed many buildings in Providence. The design scheme of a pedimented portico in front of a tower and tall spire was similar to Charles Bulfinch's design for Boston's New South Church.

The building was dedicated October 13, 1816. It was built with white stone quarried in Johnston, Rhode Island. The original floor plan was 77 x 80 feet. The spire is 189 feet, 11 inches tall. The original cost was over $50,000.

The bell in the church's bell tower is the largest cast by the Paul Revere foundry in Canton, Massachusetts.

Renovations were made to the building in 1868 and 1916. In 1966, a bolt of lightning started a fire, which burned for four hours. Plaster detailing was destroyed along with the church's organ, but both were meticulously restored. The architect for the restoration was Irving B. Haynes, of Johnson & Haynes.

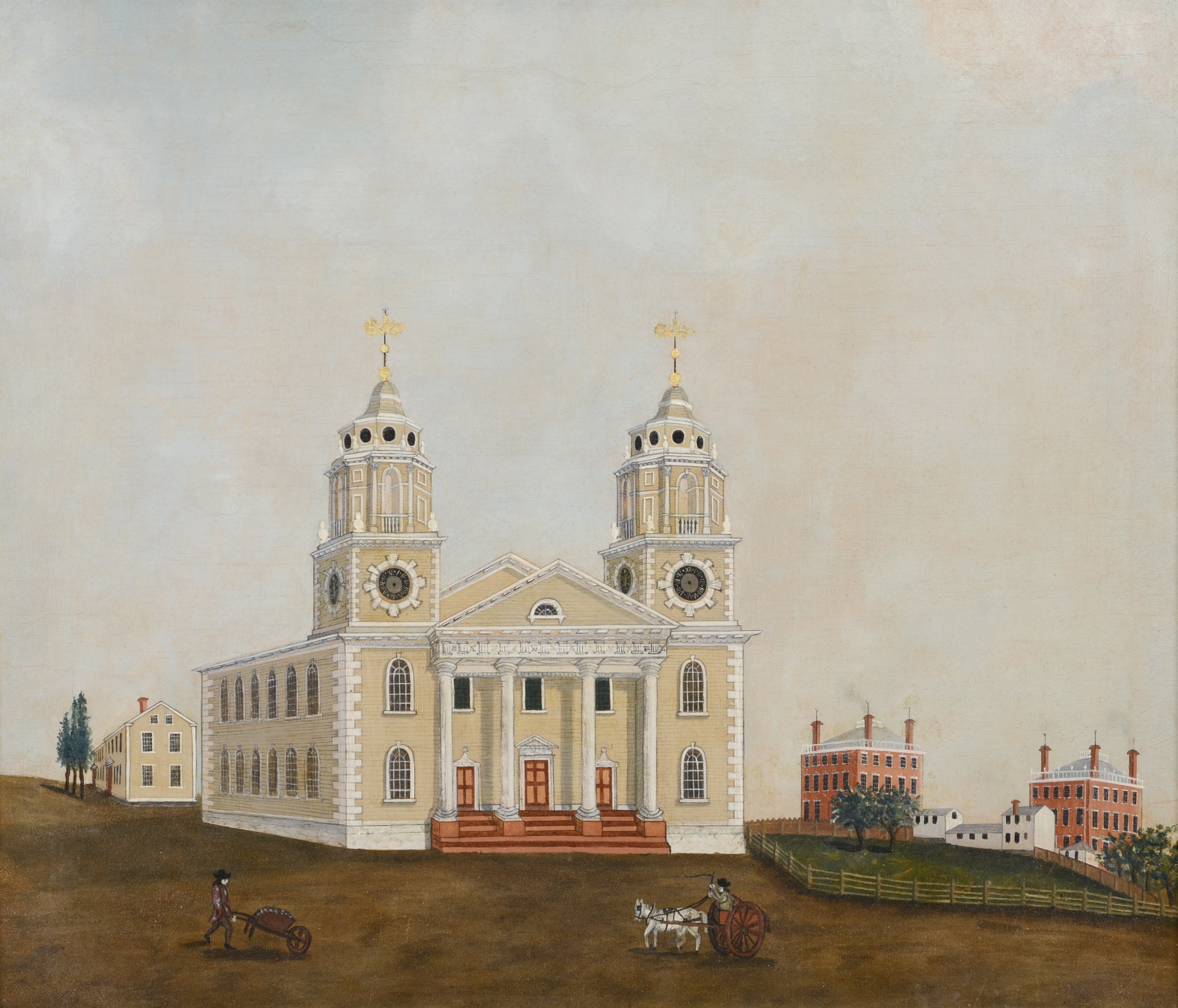
Church building erected in 1795 and destroyed by fire in 1814

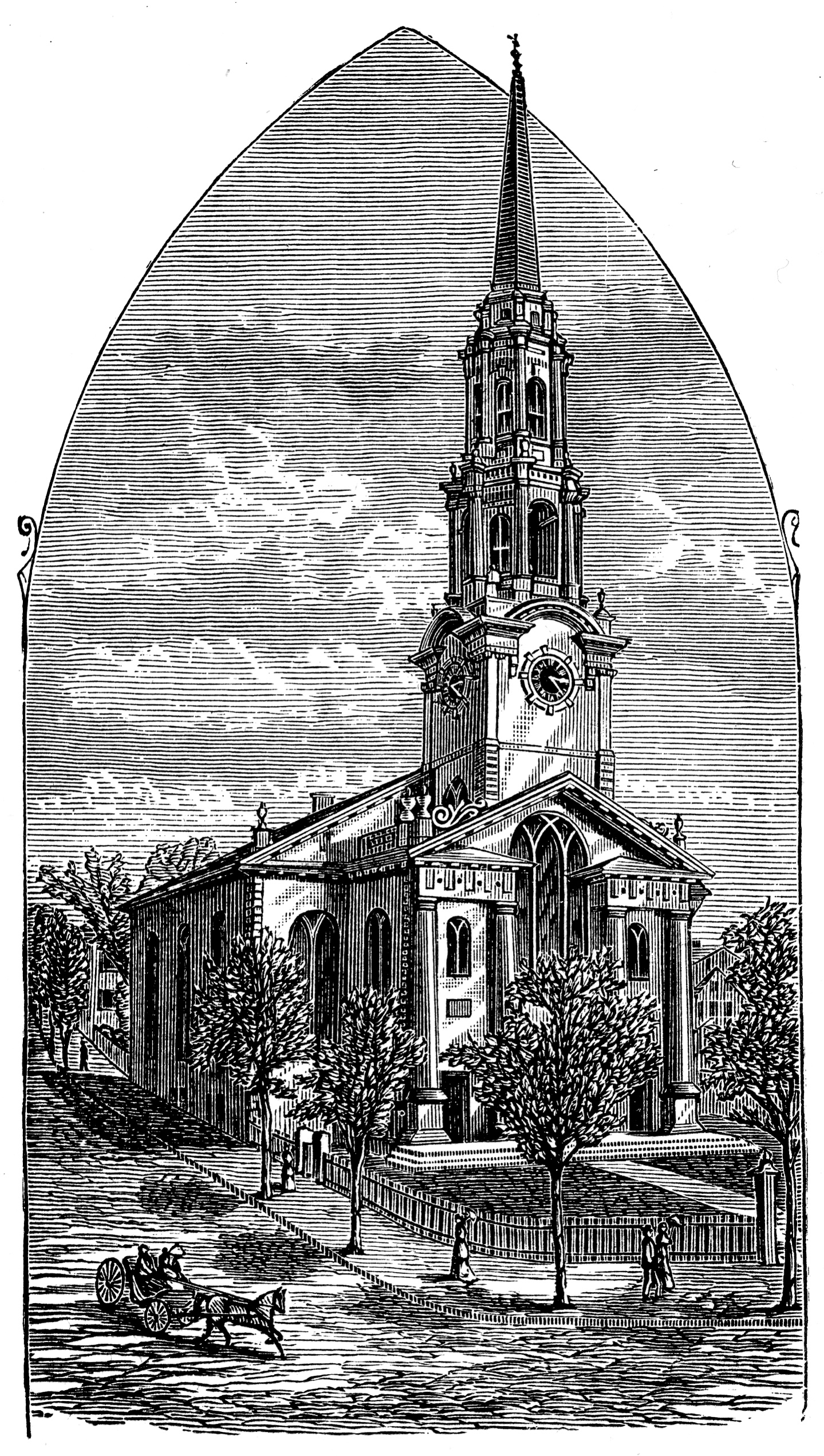
1886 engraving of the current church building

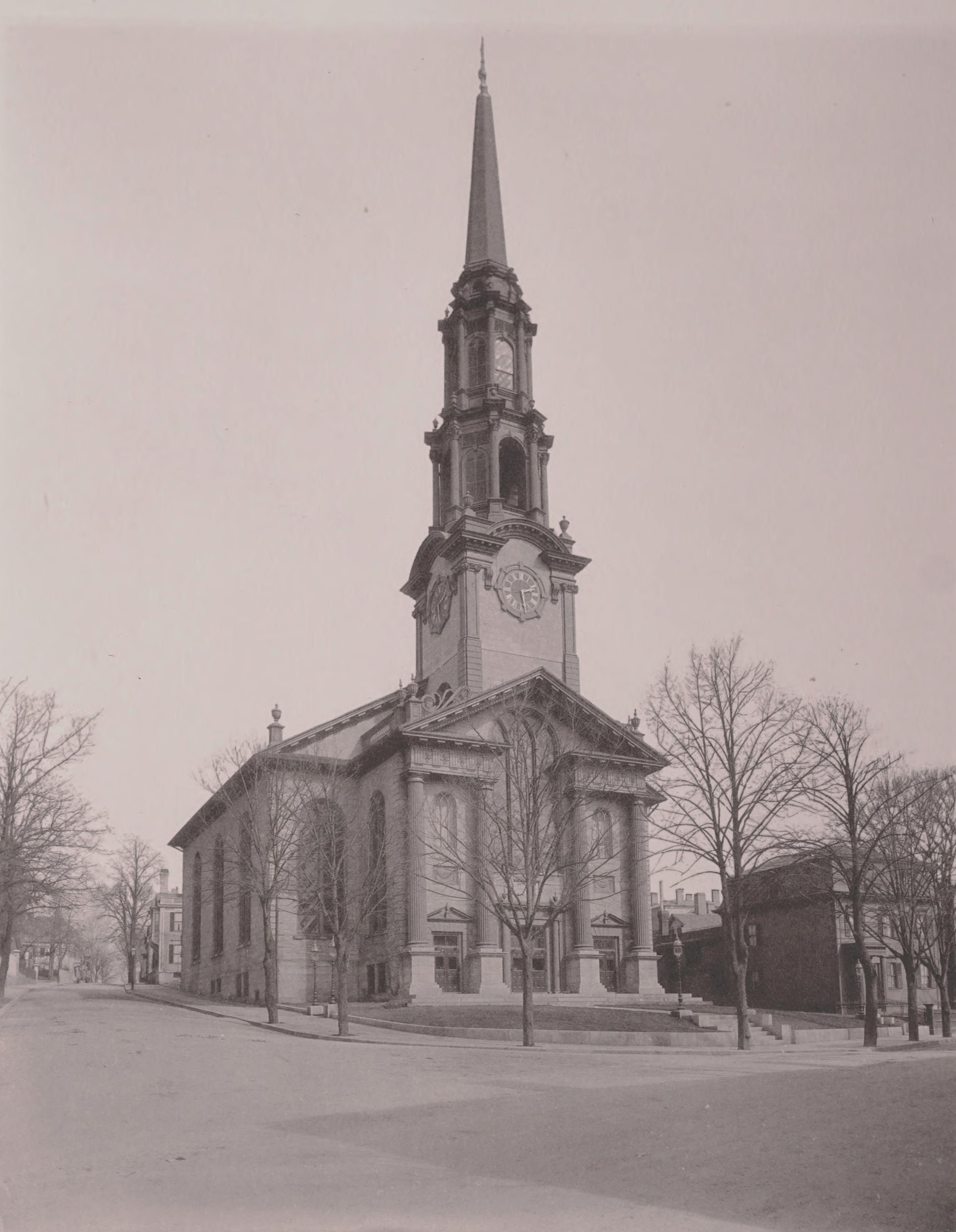
Photograph published in 1891 of the current building

=== Theology ===
Although founded as a congregationalist church, the church later became explicitly Unitarian in theology under the leadership of Rev. Henry Edes (1803-1832). For many years it was known as The First Congregational Church (Unitarian). In April 1953 the congregation voted to change the name to The First Unitarian Church of Providence.

On March 26, 2017, the church voted to become a Sanctuary Church, a policy which would allow non-citizens to stay in the church and claim protection against deportation.

== Notable services and members ==
- Funeral services for General, Governor, and Senator Ambrose Burnside were held here on September 16, 1881.
- Funeral services for Providence Mayor Thomas A. Doyle were held on June 14, 1886.
- Funeral services for Sarah Elizabeth Doyle, suffragist, educator and sister of Mayor Thomas Doyle, were held in December 1922.
- Frank F. Olney (1851—1903), 18th mayor of Providence, was a member of the church.
- Journalist Ben Bagdikian (1920—2016) was a member of the church.
