= Payne House =

Payne House may refer to:

in the United States (by state then city)

- Payne House (Greensboro, Alabama), listed on the National Register of Historic Places (NRHP) in Hale County
- Theodore F. Payne House, San Francisco, California, listed on the NRHP in San Francisco
- Elisha Payne House, Canterbury, Connecticut, also known as Prudence Crandall House, a U.S. National Historic Landmark
- Daniel Payne House, Windsor, Connecticut, listed on the NRHP in Hartford County
- A. A. Payne-John Christo, Sr., House, Panama City, Florida, listed on the NRHP in Bay County
- Christy Payne Mansion, Sarasota, Florida, listed on the NRHP in Sarasota County
- O. E. Payne House, Chariton, Iowa, listed on the NRHP in Lucas County
- Payne House (Eubank, Kentucky), listed on the National Register of Historic Places in Pulaski County
- Asa Payne House, Georgetown, Kentucky, listed on the NRHP in Scott County
- Gen. John Payne House, Georgetown, Kentucky, listed on the NRHP in Scott County
- Payne-Desha House, Georgetown, Kentucky, listed on the NRHP in Scott County
- Henry Payne House, Lexington, Kentucky, listed on the NRHP in Fayette County
- Lewis Payne House, Midway, Kentucky, listed on the NRHP in Woodford County
- Payne House (Mount Eden, Kentucky), listed on the National Register of Historic Places in Shelby County
- Monarch-Payne House, Owensboro, Kentucky, listed on the NRHP in Daviess County
- Payne-Saunders House, Nicholasville, Kentucky, listed on the NRHP in Jessamine County
- Payne-Gentry House, Bridgeton, Missouri, listed on the NRHP in St. Louis County
- Robnett-Payne House, Fulton, Missouri, listed on the NRHP in Callaway County
- Moses U. Payne House, Rocheport, Missouri, listed on the NRHP in Boone County
- Payne Cobblestone House, Conesus, New York, listed on the NRHP in Livingston County
- William Payne House, Greece, New York, listed on the NRHP in Monroe County
- Col. Oliver Hazard Payne Estate, Esopus, New York, listed on the NRHP in Ulster County
- Payne's Folly, Fawn Township, Pennsylvania, listed on the NRHP in York County
- Foster-Payne House, Pawtucket, Rhode Island, listed on the NRHP in Providence County
- Charles Payne House, Pawtucket, Rhode Island, listed on the NRHP in Providence County
- M. S. Payne House, Waxahachie, Texas, listed on the NRHP in Ellis County
- Payne-Craig House, Janesville, Wisconsin, listed on the NRHP in Rock County

== See also ==
- Perry-Payne Building, Cleveland, Ohio, listed on the NRHP in Cuyahoga County
- Payne Hotel, Saukville, Wisconsin, listed on the NRHP in Ozaukee County
