= Pawtucket Armory =

- U.S. National Register of Historic Places
- U.S. Historic district – Contributing property
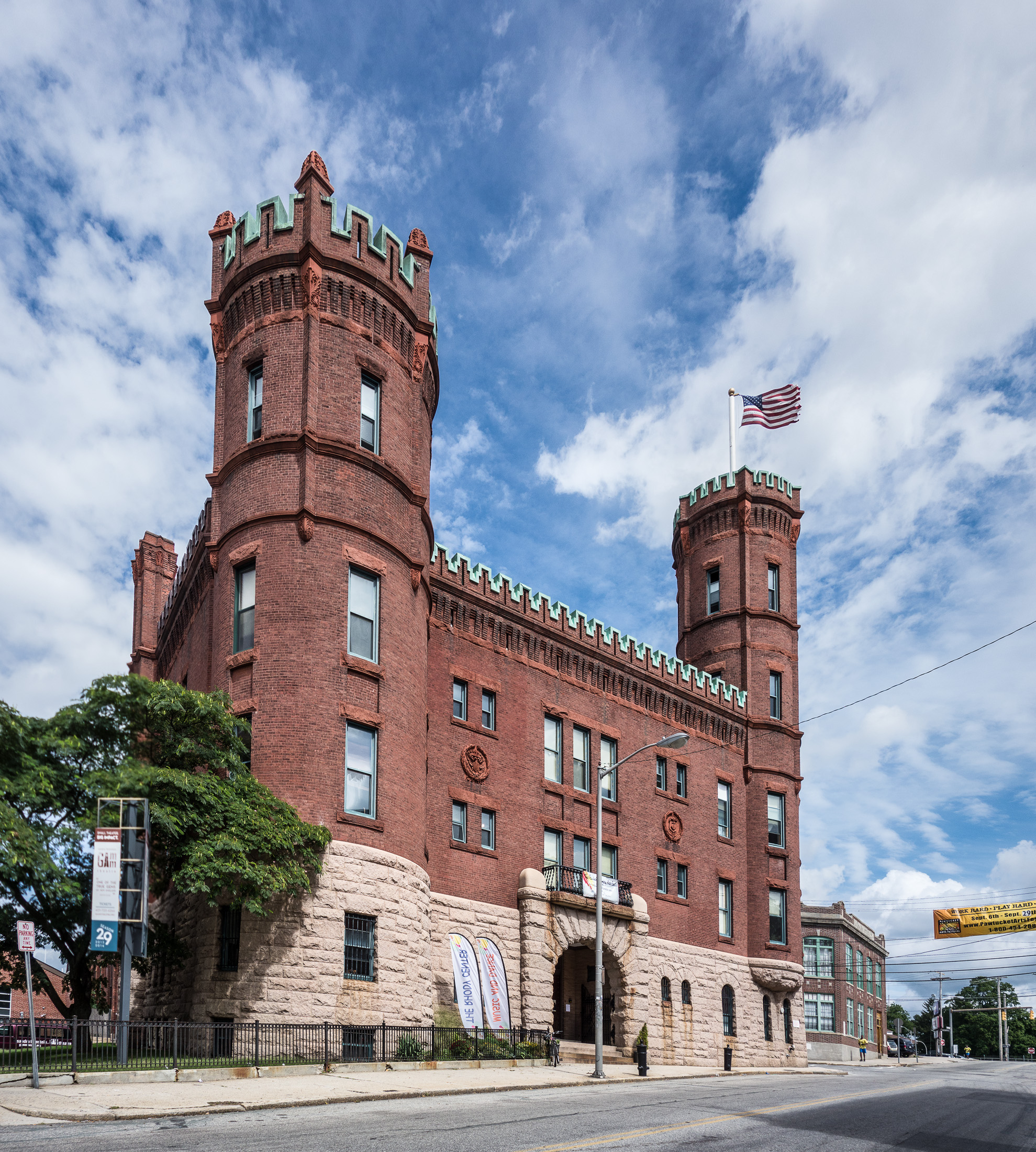
- Pawtucket Armory in 2013

- Location within Rhode Island Location within the United States
- Location: Pawtucket, Rhode Island
- Coordinates: 41°52′49″N 71°22′49″W
- Built: 1894
- Architect: William R. Walker & Son
- Part of: Exchange Street Historic District (ID02000952)
- MPS: Pawtucket MRA
- NRHP reference No.: 83003836

Significant dates
- Added to NRHP: November 18, 1983
- Designated CP: September 6, 2002

The Pawtucket Armory is an historic armory building at 172 Exchange Street in Pawtucket, Rhode Island. One of the major works of William R. Walker & Son, it was built in 1894–5. Built of red brick with granite and limestone trim, it has a distinctive main block, with crenellated towers at the corners, and is prominently sited near Pawtucket's central business district. It has a Richardsonian Romanesque entry, recessed under a round archway with wrought iron gates. The armory drill hall extends to behind the building along Fountain Street.

From 2005 to 2010, the armory housed the Jacqueline M. Walsh School for the Performing and Visual Arts. It is currently home to the Pawtucket Armory Arts Center.

The armory was listed on the National Register of Historic Places in 1983.

== See also ==
- National Register of Historic Places listings in Pawtucket, Rhode Island
