= Fifth Ward Wardroom =

- U.S. National Register of Historic Places
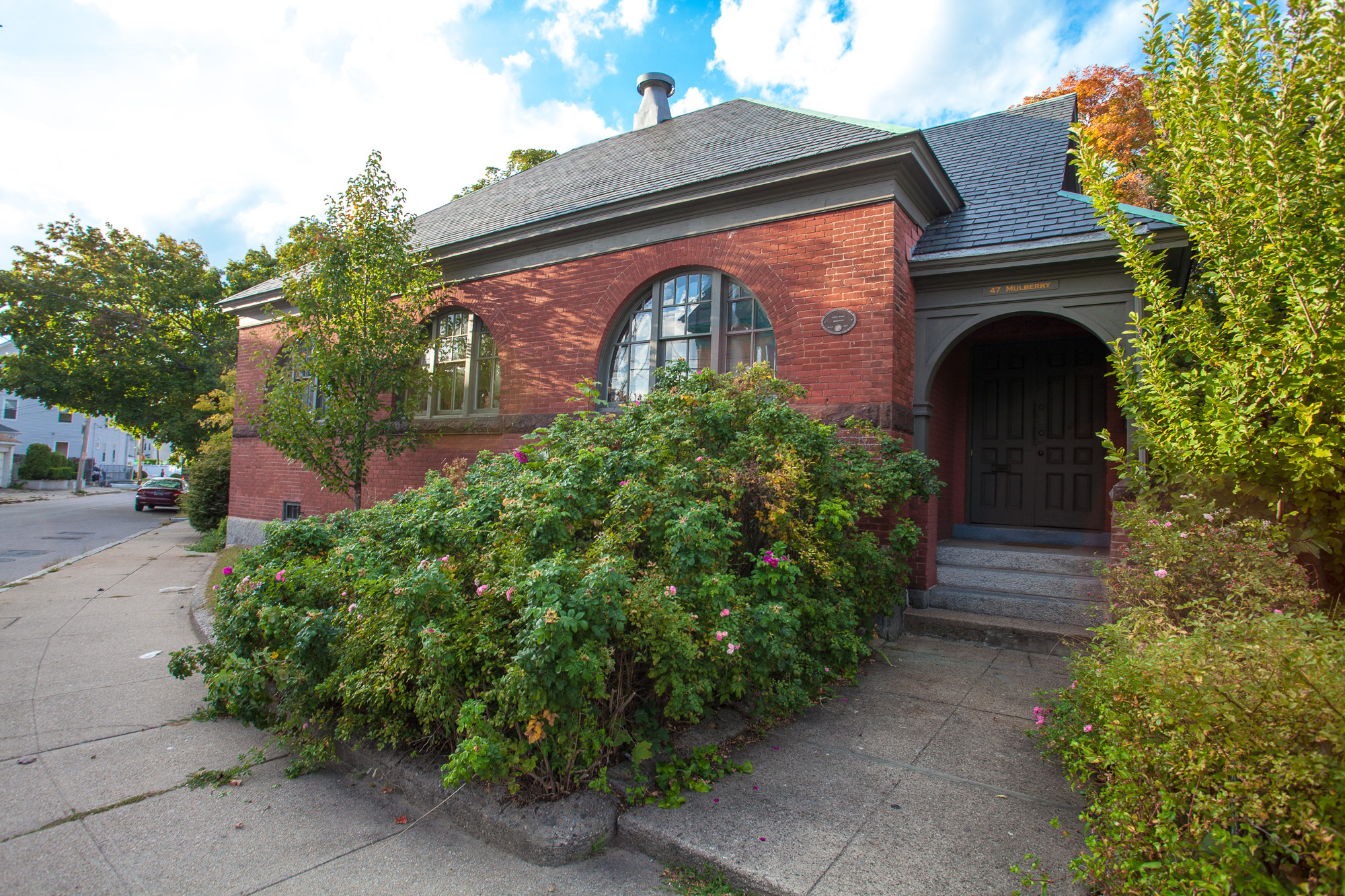
- Front of the building

- Location within Rhode Island Location within the United States
- Location: 47 Mulberry Street, Pawtucket, Rhode Island
- Coordinates: 41°52′27″N 71°23′36″W
- Built: 1886; 140 years ago
- Architect: William R. Walker & Son
- Architectural style: Queen Anne
- MPS: Pawtucket MRA
- NRHP reference No.: 83003817
- Added to NRHP: November 18, 1983

The Fifth Ward Wardroom is a historic meeting hall at 47 Mulberry Street in Pawtucket, Rhode Island. It is a single-story red brick building, with a low-pitch hipped roof. Basically rectangular, an enclosed entry pavilion projects from the main block. The building was designed by William R. Walker & Son and built in 1886. Originally used as a polling place and meeting hall, it was later used as a school and by veterans organizations before being converted into a single family residence during its National Register of Historic Places nomination. It was listed on the historic register in 1983.

== Design ==
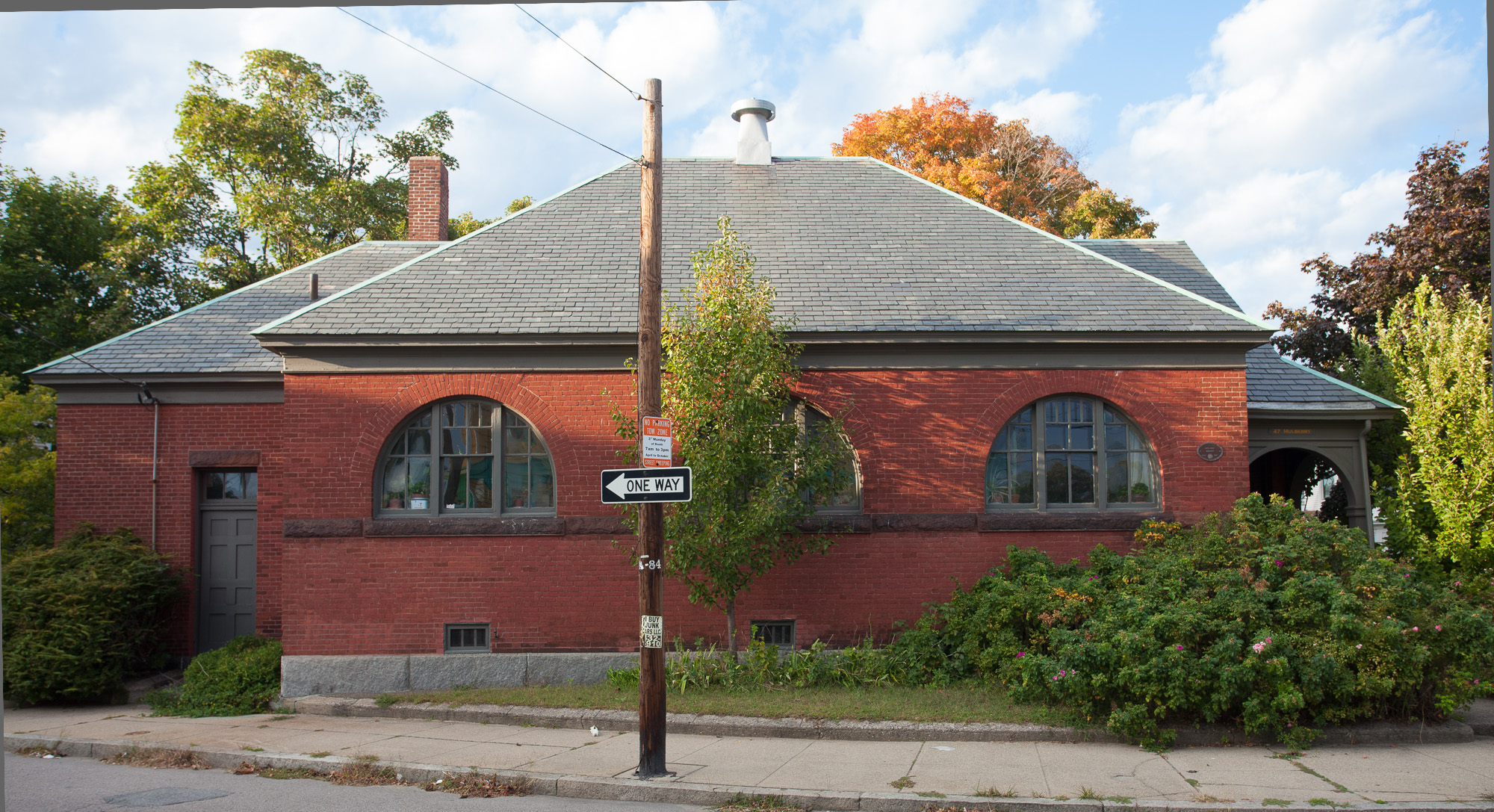
Side view

Designed by William R. Walker & Son and constructed by S. Mason & H. A. Smith in 1886, the one story red brick Queen Anne style building is basically rectangular with a low-pitched hipped roof. The red bricks are laid in dark red mortar and is contrasted by the granite sill course and brownstone belt course at window sill level. The building has a central closed entry pavilion which projects out and has two porches oriented to face Mulberry and Cedar Street. The building has three lunette windows on the sides of the main block, each divided into thirds, and a smaller windows on the pavilion's pedimented end. The rear ell has double hung two-over-two sash windows. At the time of the nomination, during the renovations to a single family home, the house had its Cedar Street porch closed in with plywood and the smaller lunette windows were boarded in, but the exterior wooden trim was largely extant.

== Use ==
The Fifth Ward Wardroom was constructed and used as a polling place and meeting hall in a critical time when Pawtucket was incorporated as a city before later being used as a school and eventually a legion post. At the time it was nominated to the National Historic Register, the house was undergoing renovations to become a private single family residence. Prior to its conversion, it was the Henrietta I. Drummond Post No. 50 of the American Legion. According to public records, the house remains a private residence.

== Significance ==
The Fifth Ward Wardroom is historically significant as a reminder of the pivotal time in which Pawtucket was incorporated as a city and gave up its town-meeting form of governance. The building is also architecturally significant as a rare type of building, wardrooms, and is one of three extant examples in Rhode Island. William R. Walker & Son constructed three such structures in Pawtucket with the First Ward Wardroom being extant and the third example having been demolished. Though both were constructed by William R. Walker & Son, the two Pawtucket wardrooms are related, but not identical in construction and show variations by the firm. Another wardroom, with a bungalow style, is located in the Cato Hill Historic District in Woonsocket, Rhode Island. The Fifth Ward Wardroom was listed on the National Register of Historic Places in 1983.

== See also ==
- National Register of Historic Places listings in Pawtucket, Rhode Island
