= First Ward Wardroom =

- U.S. National Register of Historic Places
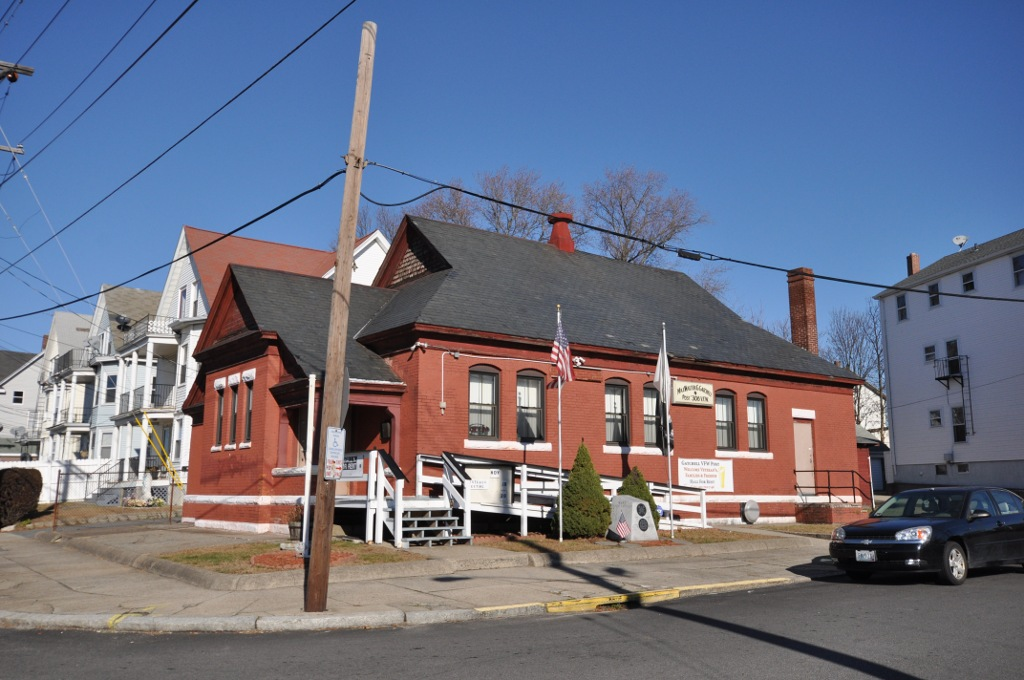

- Location within Rhode Island Location within the United States
- Location: 171 Fountain Street, Pawtucket, Rhode Island
- Coordinates: 41°53′7″N 71°22′41″W
- Built: 1886
- Architect: William R. Walker & Son
- Architectural style: Queen Anne
- MPS: Pawtucket MRA
- NRHP reference No.: 83003820
- Added to NRHP: November 18, 1983

The First Ward Wardroom is a historic meeting hall at 171 Fountain Street in Pawtucket, Rhode Island. It is a single-story red brick building, with a low-pitch gable-over-hipped roof. Basically rectangular, an enclosed entry pavilion projects from the main block. The building, designed by William R. Walker & Son and built in 1886, is one of only three ward halls (structures built by the city and used as polling places and meeting halls) to survive in the state. Since about 1920 it has been the Major Walter G. Gatchell Post No. 306 of the Veterans of Foreign Wars. The building was listed on the National Register of Historic Places in 1983.

== Design ==
Designed by William R. Walker & Son and constructed by S. Mason & H. A. Smith in 1886, the one story red brick Queen Anne style building is basically rectangular with a low-pitched gable-over-hipped roof. The red bricks are laid in dark red mortar and is contrasted by the granite sill course and the now painted grey brownstone stringcourse, window sills and lintels and the lintels of the doors. The enclosed entry pavilion projects from the main block with two porches oriented to face Fountain Street and Blake Street. Three arched double hung windows with two-over-two sash run along the sides of the building with three smaller windows are in the entry pavilion. At the time of the National Register of Historic Places nomination, these smaller windows were boarded up and the porch oriented to Fountain Street was bricked in with the buildings original materials. One original eight-panel door remained on the Blake Street entry porch, but the rest of the exterior details were extant, including the boarded pavilion pediment with "1st Ward" in raised lettering.

National Register of Historic Places nomination states that the interior of the building originally opened into a large meeting hall with some auxiliary service rooms at the rear of the building, but did not disclose any alterations made to the interior.

== Use ==
The Fifth Ward Wardroom was constructed and used as a polling place and meeting hall in a critical time when Pawtucket was incorporated as a city before becoming the Major Walter G. Gatchell Post No. 306 of the Veterans of Foreign Wars. Since about 1920, the Gatchell Post has occupied the First Ward Wardroom, but the property is owned by the City of Pawtucket. In 2013, the building was in need of significant roof repairs and the Gatchell Post reached out to the community to help raise the necessary funds.

== Significance ==
The First Ward Wardroom is significant as a historical reminder of the pivotal time in which Pawtucket was incorporated as a city and gave up its town-meeting form of governance. The building is also architecturally significant as a rare type of building, wardrooms, and is one of three extant examples in Rhode Island. William R. Walker & Son constructed three such structures in Pawtucket with the Fifth Ward Wardroom being extant and the third example having been demolished. Though both constructed by William R. Walker & Son, the two Pawtucket wardrooms are related, but not identical in construction and show variations by the firm. Another wardroom, with a bungalow style, is located in the Cato Hill Historic District in Woonsocket, Rhode Island. The First Ward Wardroom was listed on the National Register of Historic Places on November 18, 1983.

== See also ==
- National Register of Historic Places listings in Pawtucket, Rhode Island
