= John F. Adams House =

Historic house in Rhode Island, United States

- U.S. National Register of Historic Places
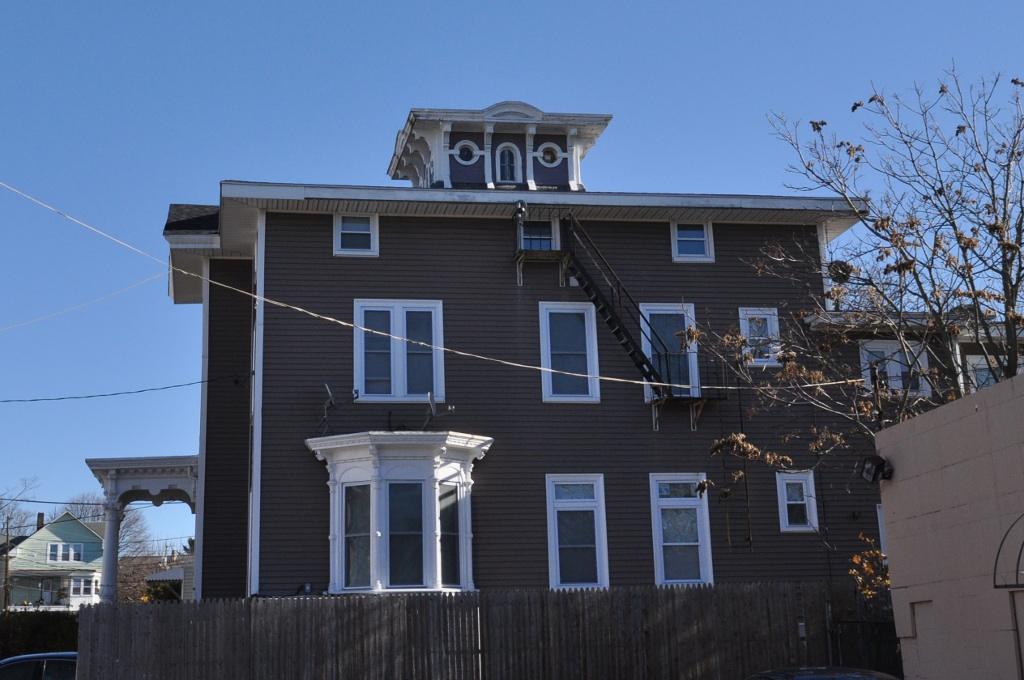

- Location within Rhode Island Location within the United States
- Location: 11 Allen Avenue, Pawtucket, Rhode Island
- Coordinates: 41°52′59″N 71°22′38″W
- Built: 1867
- Architectural style: Italianate
- MPS: Pawtucket MRA
- NRHP reference No.: 83003804
- Added to NRHP: November 18, 1983

The John F. Adams House is a historic house in Pawtucket, Rhode Island, United States. In 1983 it was added to the National Register of Historic Places (listed incorrectly as the John E. Adams House); the house's unique exterior and architecture were described in the multiple property submission as the "finest late Italianate dwelling still standing in Pawtucket." Its design is similar to the dwellings designed by Henry Austin and features Moorish window hoods and Indian porch columns. The John F. Adams House was moved back 50 feet (15 m) and turned to face Allen Avenue after it was purchased by the Beacon Oil Company in 1929. This minor move was found not to make it ineligible because of the house's architectural and historical significance. It was added to the National Register of Historic Places in 1983.

== Design ==
The house was erected in 1867 by John F. Adams, a wealthy manufacturer of printed textiles and later mayor of Pawtucket, Rhode Island in 1898. The architect of the John F. Adams House is currently unknown, but the National Register of Historic Places's multiple property submission provides an interpretation of its design and architectural roots. The stylistic evidence suggests that the architect of the home was not local, noting the use of "Indian-derived columns and other Eastern details, as early as the 1840s." These details were introduced in the 1840s by Henry Austin, but the work also has similar aspects to the James Knapp House that were featured in Edmund V. Gillon Jr.'s Early Illustrations and Views of American Architecture. Similarities to the Knapp house include the overall form, the pilastered cupola and Moorish windows. According to the NRHP nomination, the Providence Journal does not list the name of an architect, but notes that Nathan Crowell was the carpenter for the house. The nomination form goes as far as to suggest that Crowell may have copied the designs reprinted in Gillon's book. The design is noted as "characteristic of the distinctive vernacular taste of lower Connecticut."

== Use ==
The John F. Adams House originally fronted on Broadway, but it was moved after it was purchased by the Beacon Oil Company in 1929. Instead of tearing down the house to build a gas station on Broadway, the Beacon Oil Company moved the house 50 feet (15 m) back and turned it 90 degrees to face Allen Avenue. The designation of the property is Pawtucket Assessor's Plat 20B, lot 529. Near the John F. Adams House are the identical twin Fuller Houses.

== Importance ==
The multiple property submission states that the John F. Adams House is the "finest late Italianate dwelling still standing in Pawtucket. The exotic details of its principal facade – the Moorish window hoods and Indian porch columns – are unmatched in the city and link the Adams House to a group of similar mid-nineteenth-century dwellings designed by Henry Austin and his followers in the vicinity of New Haven, Connecticut." Despite having been moved, the house was still found to have met the standards for the National Register of Historic Places due to the architectural and historical significance of the property and that the move was relatively insignificant. The John F. Adams House was added to the National Register of Historic Places in 1983.

== See also ==
- National Register of Historic Places listings in Pawtucket, Rhode Island
- List of Registered Historic Places in Rhode Island
