= Scholze =

Scholze is a German surname. Notable people with the surname include:

- Georg Scholze (1897–1945), German general during World War II
- Johann Sigismund Scholze (1705–1750), Silesian music anthologist and poet
- Peter Scholze (born 1987), German mathematician

== See also ==
- Scholze–Sayles House, a historic house in Pawtucket, Rhode Island
