= Mitchell–Arnold House =

Historic house in Rhode Island, United States

- U.S. National Register of Historic Places
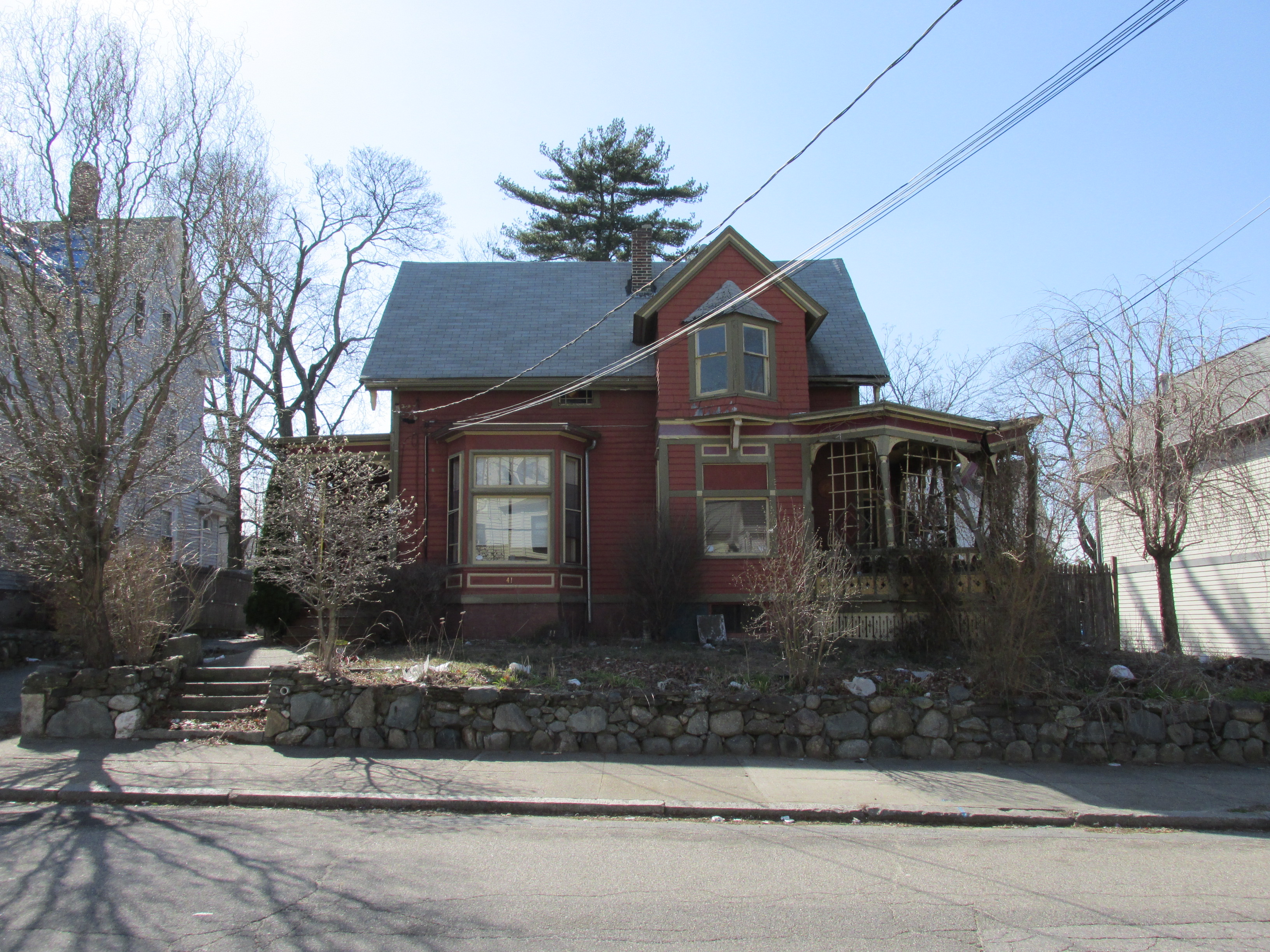
- Mitchell–Arnold House

- Location within Rhode Island Location within the United States
- Location: 41 Waldo Street, Pawtucket, Rhode Island
- Coordinates: 41°51′58″N 71°23′27″W
- Built: 1871
- Architectural style: Late Victorian
- MPS: Pawtucket MRA
- NRHP reference No.: 83003833
- Added to NRHP: November 18, 1983

The Mitchell–Arnold House is a historic house located in Pawtucket, Rhode Island.

== Description and history ==
It is a picturesque 1 1/2-story wood-frame structure, built in 1871 and added to and modified in subsequent decades. It began as a flank-gable cottage, a form typical for the time, and was gradually extended with projecting sections, additions, and an elaborately decorated porch to create a fine example of Queen Anne architecture. The original house was built by James W. Mitchell, a clerk at a local lumber company; the additions were probably made by John H. Arnold, a real estate and insurance broker.

The house was listed on the National Register of Historic Places on November 18, 1983.

== See also ==
- National Register of Historic Places listings in Pawtucket, Rhode Island
