= Childs–Brown House =

Historic house in Rhode Island, United States

- U.S. National Register of Historic Places
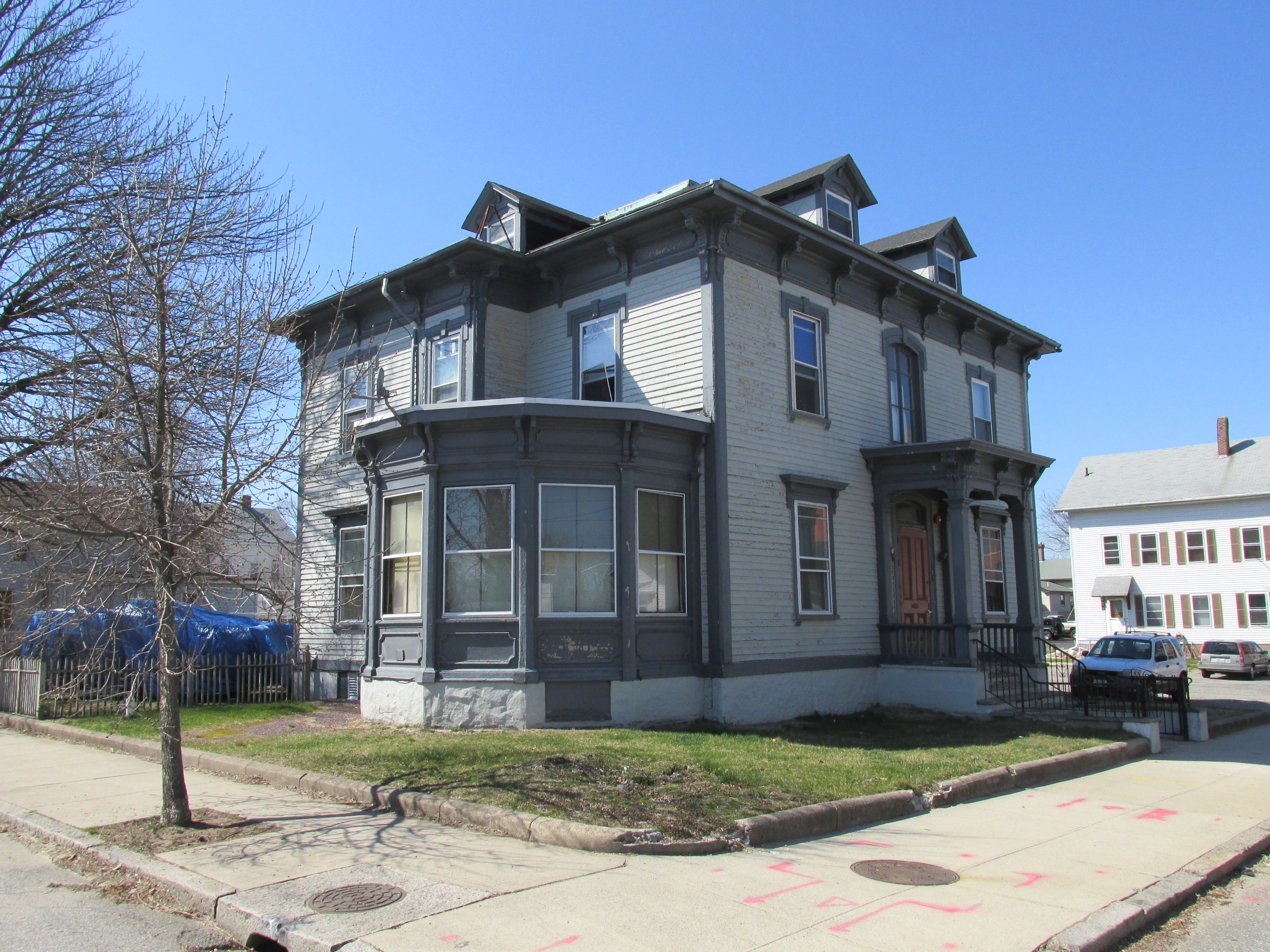
- Childs–Brown House

- Location within Rhode Island Location within the United States
- Location: 172 Pine Street, Pawtucket, Rhode Island
- Coordinates: 41°52′28″N 71°23′29″W
- Built: 1868
- Architectural style: Italianate, Queen Anne
- MPS: Pawtucket MRA
- NRHP reference No.: 83003807
- Added to NRHP: November 18, 1983

The Childs–Brown House is an historic house in Pawtucket, Rhode Island. It is a two-story wood-frame structure, roughly square in shape, with a low-pitch hipped roof broken by dormer roofs. An ell extends to the rear of the house. Both the eaves and the roof of the front porch exhibit heavy brackets typical of the Italianate style. The interior also retains Italianate style in its woodwork, most prominently in the semi-elliptical main stairway. Built in 1868–69 for Alfred L. Childs, an ice dealer, it was for a number of years owned by members of the Brown family prominent in Rhode Island civic and economic life.

The house was listed on the National Register of Historic Places in 1983.

== See also ==
- National Register of Historic Places listings in Pawtucket, Rhode Island
