= Nathaniel Montgomery House =

Historic house in Rhode Island, United States

- U.S. National Register of Historic Places
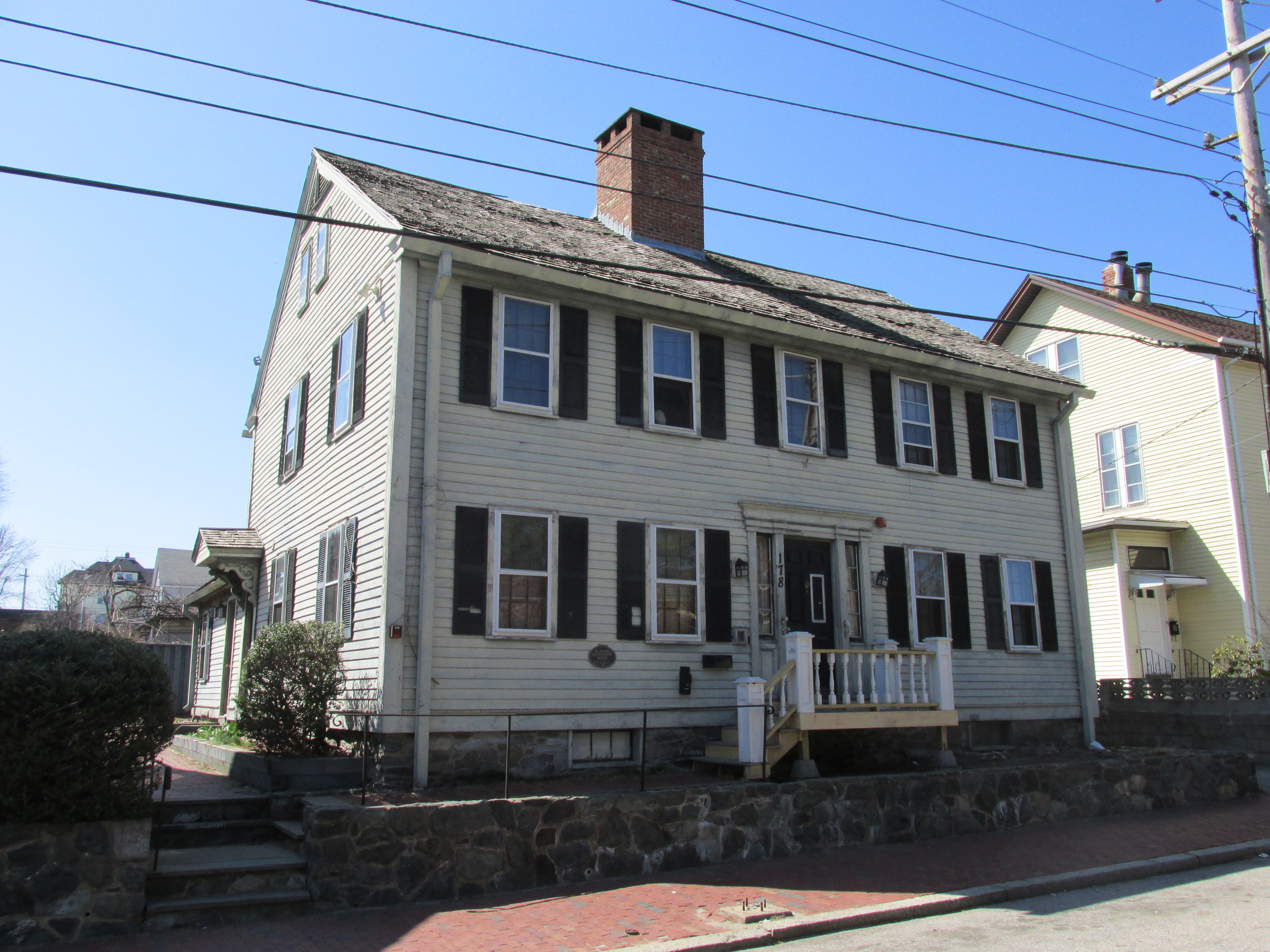
- Nathaniel Montgomery House

- Location within Rhode Island Location within the United States
- Location: Pawtucket, Rhode Island
- Coordinates: 41°52′51″N 71°23′5″W
- Built: 1814
- Architect: Nathaniel Montgomery
- NRHP reference No.: 84002030
- Added to NRHP: January 19, 1984

The Nathaniel Montgomery House is an historic house at 178 High Street in Pawtucket, Rhode Island.

== Background ==
It is a 2 1/2-story wood-frame structure, five bays wide, with a large central chimney, and a centered entry framed by sidelights and pilasters, and topped by an entablature. It was built circa 1815, probably by Nathaniel Montgomery, its first owner, as a tenement house, evidenced by the unusual room arrangements in the interior. It is the oldest known surviving tenement house in the city.

The house was listed on the National Register of Historic Places in 1984.

== See also ==
- National Register of Historic Places listings in Pawtucket, Rhode Island
