= Fire Station No. 4 (Pawtucket, Rhode Island) =

- U.S. National Register of Historic Places
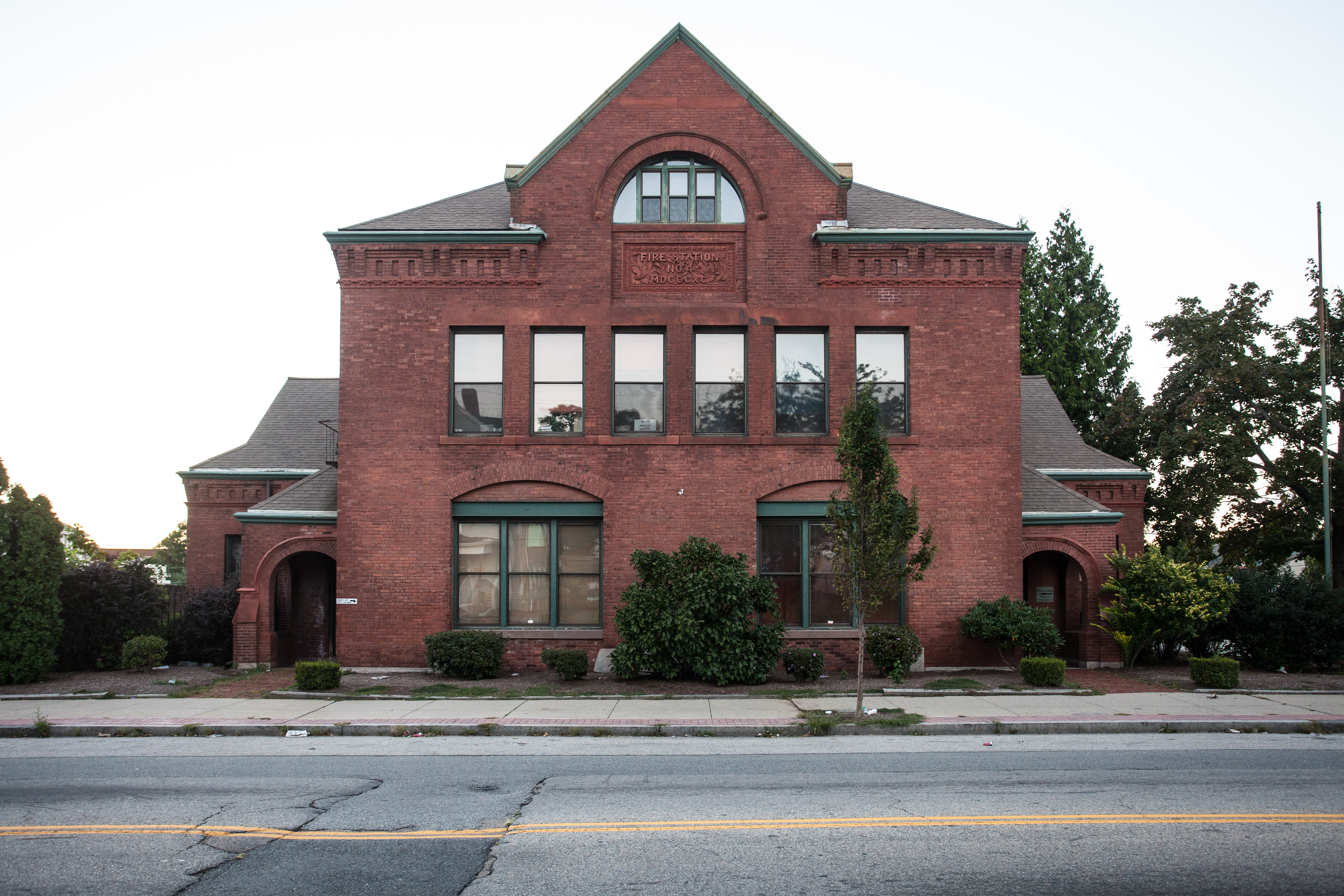

- Location within Rhode Island Location within the United States
- Location: Pawtucket, Rhode Island
- Coordinates: 41°53′11″N 71°22′36″W
- Built: 1890
- Architect: William R. Walker & Son
- Architectural style: Queen Anne
- MPS: Pawtucket MRA
- NRHP reference No.: 83003819
- Added to NRHP: November 18, 1983

Fire Station Number 4 or Fire Station No. 4 is a historic fire station located at 474 Broadway in Pawtucket, Rhode Island. The building historically has also been called the Collyer Fire Station. The Queen Anne Style station was built in 1890. It is a 2 1/2-story, hip-roofed rectangular brick building with two brick wings and a bell tower. Constructed of red brick with sandstone trim and sandstone lintels and sills on the windows, the building has a foliate terracotta plaque bearing its name and date of construction. The fire station was closed as a firehouse in 1974, when the current Fire Station Number 4 on Cottage Street opened. The interior of the building was greatly modified to accommodate offices and meeting rooms by the time of its listing on the national register. In 2014, the building is being used by the Catholic Charities of Providence. Fire Station Number 4 was added to the National Register of Historic Places in 1983.

== Design ==
Fire Station Number 4, also known as the Collyer Fire Station, (see building plaque) was constructed in 1887-1888 by H. L. Bassett & Co. and F. L. Mason on the southwest corner of Broadway and Carnation Street, in the center of Pleasant View neighborhood. The building was completed and named in 1890. The main block of the Queen Anne-styled red brick firehouse is a 2 1/2-story, hip-roofed rectangle with a cross-gable facing Broadway. A pair of matching single-story wings with gable-on-hipped roofs project from the long sides of the building. The building has small hip-roofed porches with arched openings on the main entrance and Broadway facing sides. Though constructed of red brick and pinkish mortar, sandstone was used for the window sills and lintels and the station's trim. The building has detailed terracotta work, with an ornate foliate name and date plaque on the front gable and a string course at the base of the corbeled main entrance. Above the plaque is a semi-circular window, and another round-headed window is on the northern side. The northwest corner has a square hose drying/bell tower that also has its own round headed window. Photos of the building are available here. The station has been modified; its two fire engine doors have been removed and replaced with modern garage doors. The pyramidal roof on the belfry which crowned the bell tower was "recently" removed at the time of its NRHP nomination in 1983. The interior of the firehouse has been greatly altered in the conversion to office and meeting room space by the time of its National Register of Historic Places nomination. The surviving details included the Queen Anne staircase and sunken panel doors. Though the interior has been greatly modified, it did not prevent its being listed on the historic register.

== Use ==
In 1974, Fire Station Number 4 was replaced by a new Fire Station Number 4 located on 397 Cottage Street. This was not to be the only replacement of the firehouses which would be reused through the Community Development Block Grant program, which assisted in the adaptation in the late 1970s and into the 1980s. By the time of its nomination, the fire station had been re-purposed as office and meeting space for city agencies. In 2014, the property was used by the Catholic Charities of Providence for Project Hope as a "Diocesan community advocacy, parish outreach and social service assistance center". In 2017, a new tenant, Rhode Island bankruptcy lawyer John S. Simonian, became a tenant in the building.

== Significance ==
The Fire Station Number 4 is architecturally significant as an example of a late 19th-century Queen Anne-style firehouse. The firehouse's distinguishing feature is the corbeled cornice and terracotta trim, but also it is historically significant as an example of Pawtucket's maturation as a city. The boundary for the property is listed as Plat 7B, lot 164 and includes the surrounding area, totaling less than one acre. Fire Station Number 4 was added to the National Register of Historic Places on November 18, 1983.

== See also ==
- National Register of Historic Places listings in Pawtucket, Rhode Island
- List of Registered Historic Places in Rhode Island
