= Lorenzo Crandall House =

Historic house in Rhode Island, United States

- U.S. National Register of Historic Places
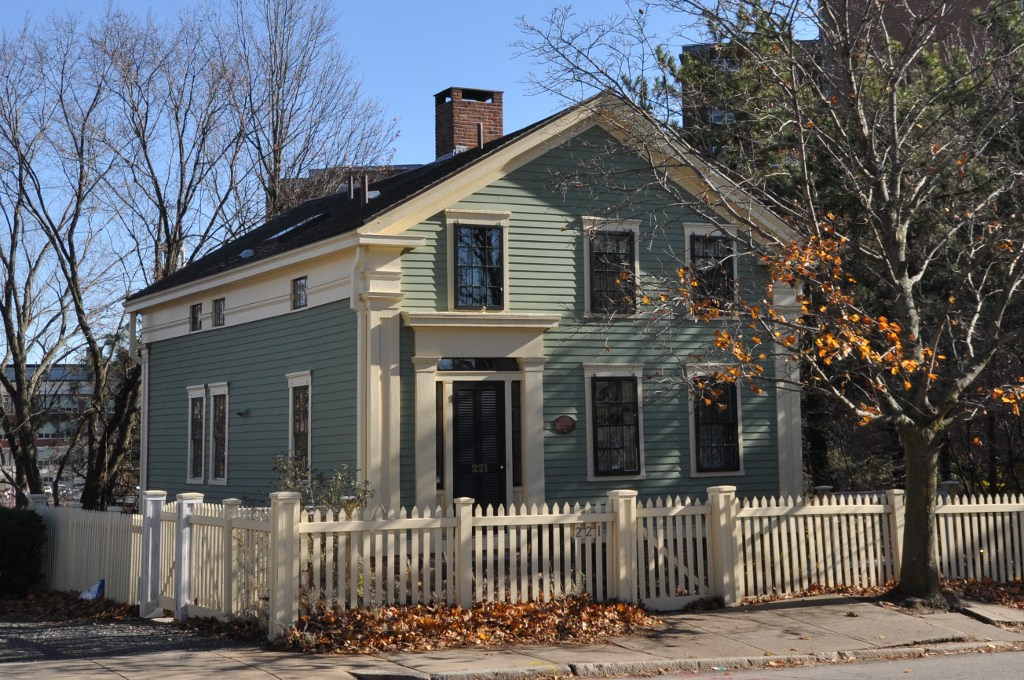

- Location within Rhode Island Location within the United States
- Location: 221 High Street, Pawtucket, Rhode Island
- Coordinates: 41°52′53″N 71°23′3″W
- Built: 1848
- Architectural style: Greek Revival
- NRHP reference No.: 78000072
- Added to NRHP: December 10, 1984

The Lorenzo Crandall House is an historic house in Pawtucket, Rhode Island. It is a 2 1/2-story wood-frame structure, built in 1848–49 for (and probably by) Lorenzo Crandall, a carpenter. It features modest Greek Revival styling, including corner pilasters, a wide banded cornice, and molded window caps. It is a well-preserved example of a type of housing that was once quite common in Pawtucket, but is no longer.

The house was listed on the National Register of Historic Places in 1984.

== See also ==
- National Register of Historic Places listings in Pawtucket, Rhode Island
