= Phillips Insulated Wire Company Complex =

- U.S. National Register of Historic Places
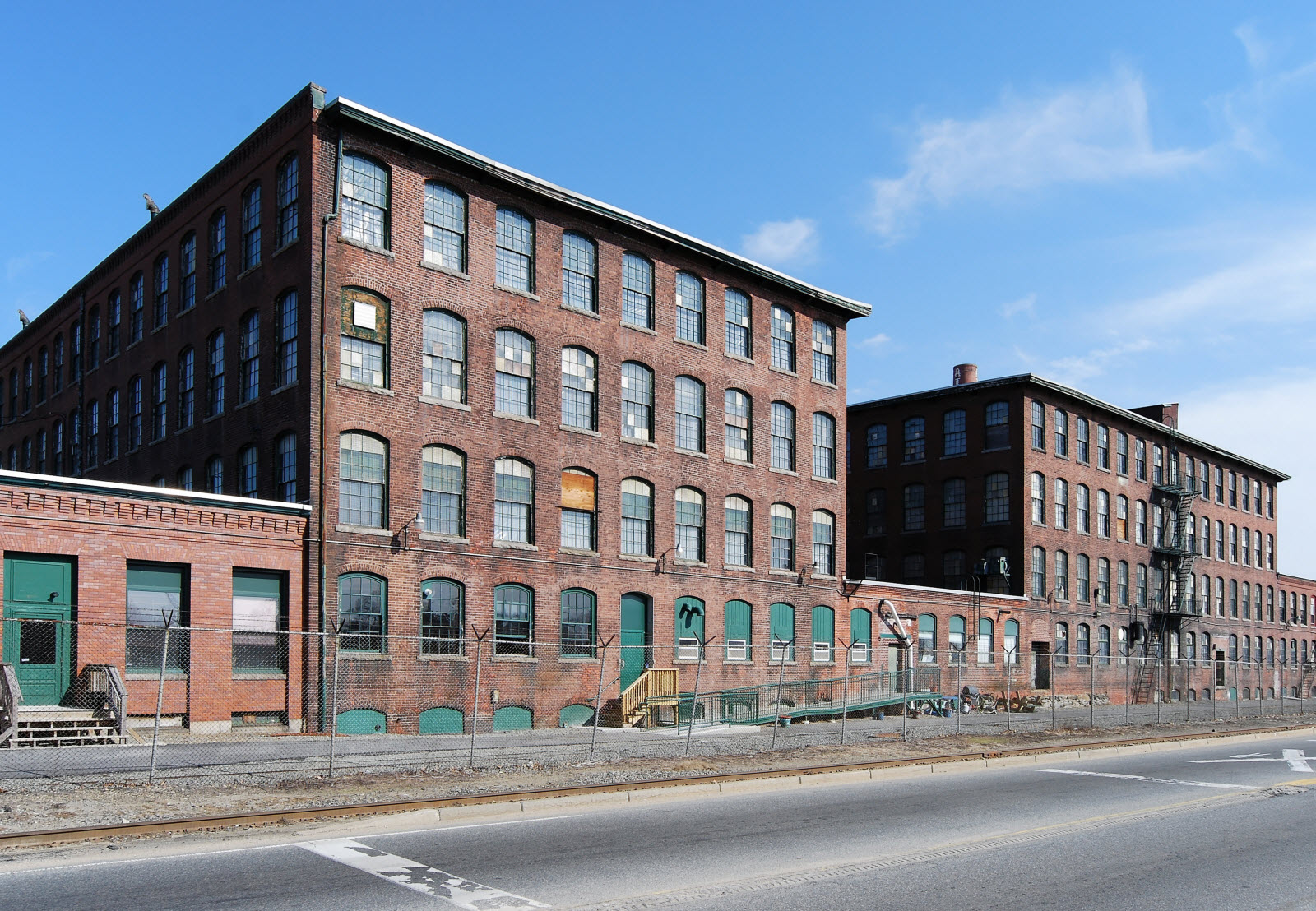
- 413 Central Ave Pawtucket

- Location within Rhode Island Location within the United States
- Location: Pawtucket, Rhode Island
- Coordinates: 41°53′4″N 71°21′59″W
- Area: 6 acres (2.4 ha)
- Built: 1898
- Architectural style: Early Commercial
- NRHP reference No.: 04000194
- Added to NRHP: March 19, 2004

The Phillips Insulated Wire Company Complex is an historic industrial site at 413 Central Avenue in Pawtucket, Rhode Island. Encompassing three city blocks, the Phillips complex includes fourteen brick buildings with more than 350,000 square feet (33,000 m^{2}) of space. They were built by the Phillips Insulated Wire Company between about 1898 and 1927. The company, established in 1888, was one of the most successful manufacturers of coated wire products, in an industry that ranked as the third-largest in Pawtucket. The complex was used by a variety of owners for the manufacture of such products until 2003.

The complex was listed on the National Register of Historic Places in 2004.

== See also ==
- National Register of Historic Places listings in Pawtucket, Rhode Island
