= Church Hill Industrial District =

Historic district in Rhode Island, United States

- U.S. National Register of Historic Places
- U.S. Historic district
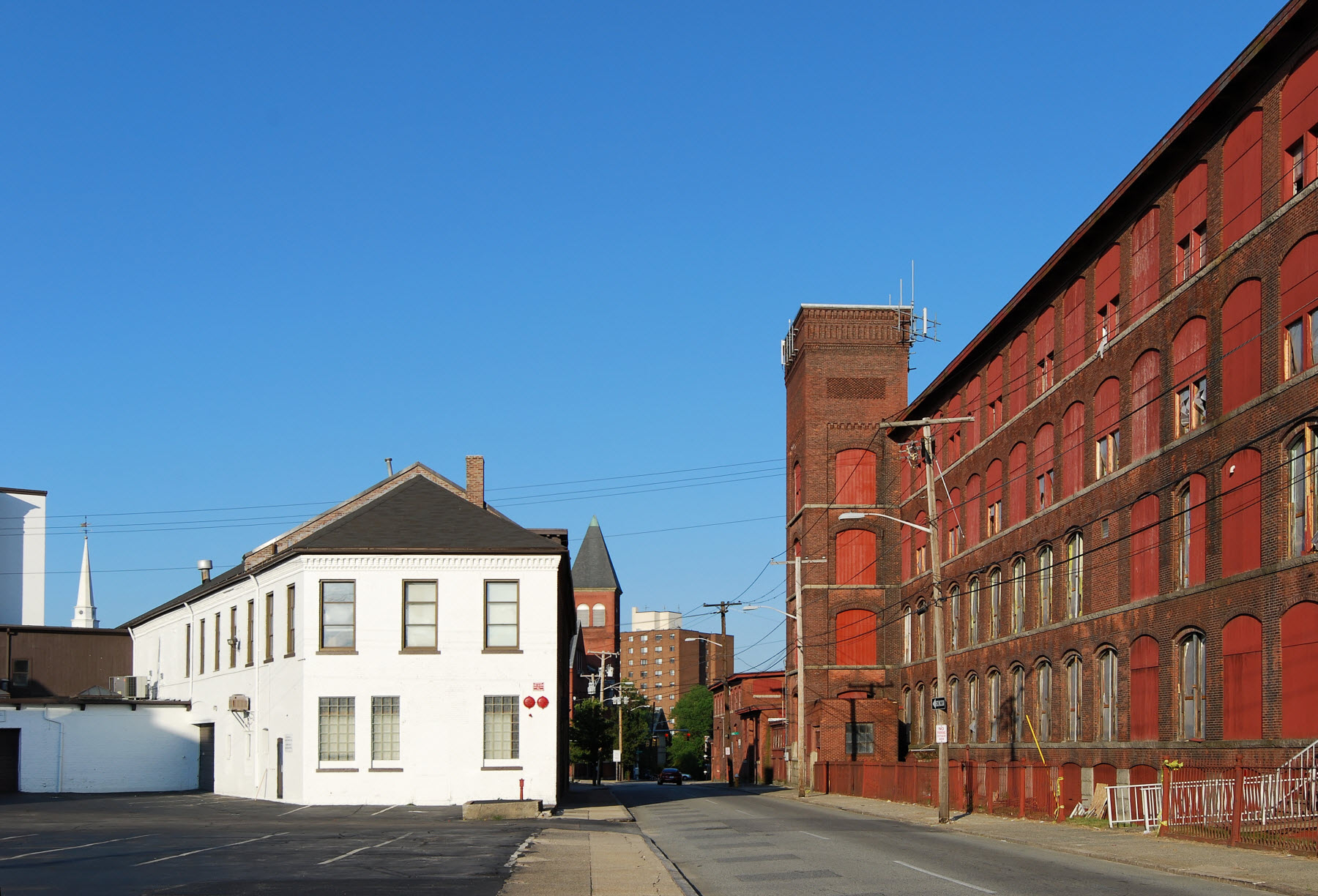
- Church Street

- Location within Rhode Island Location within the United States
- Location: Pawtucket, Rhode Island
- Coordinates: 41°52′34″N 71°23′22″W
- Area: 13 acres (5.3 ha) (7 acres (2.8 ha) before 2011 increase)
- Built: 1848
- NRHP reference No.: 82000135 (original); 10001218 (increase)

Significant dates
- Added to NRHP: August 12, 1982
- Boundary increase: February 7, 2011

The Church Hill Industrial District is an industrial historic district on the west side of Pawtucket, Rhode Island. It encompasses an area that was intensively developed between about 1850 and 1920, and includes five separate industrial facilities. Four of these are relatively modest in size (as compared to Pawtucket's largest mills), and originally served a combination of textile mills and ironworks, the latter of which often manufactured parts used in the textile manufacturing processes. The oldest building is an 1848 ironworks facility, which runs along Pine Street between Main and Bayley. The largest single complex, added in the 2011 expansion of the district, is the Union Waddell complex between Bayley Street and the Amtrak railroad tracks, which has ten surviving buildings from the early 20th century.

The district was added to the National Register of Historic Places in 1982, and enlarged in 2011.

== See also ==
- National Register of Historic Places in Pawtucket, Rhode Island
