= Moore Fabric Company Plant =

Historic industrial complex in Pawtucket, Rhode Island

- U.S. National Register of Historic Places
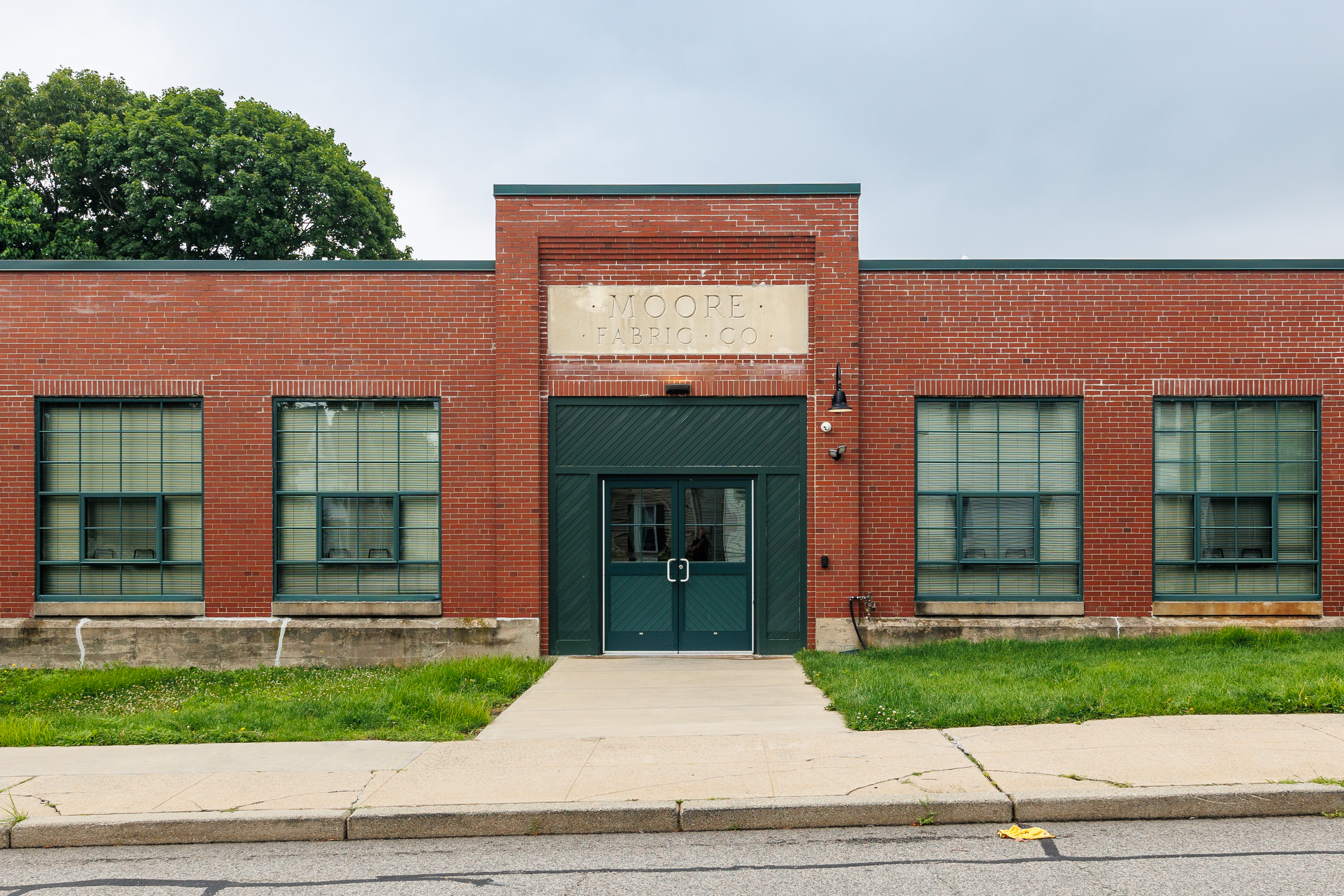

- Location within Rhode Island Location within the United States
- Location: 45-47 Washington St., Pawtucket, Rhode Island
- Coordinates: 41°52′13″N 71°23′35″W
- Built: 1919
- Architect: Dwight Seabury
- NRHP reference No.: 100004785
- Added to NRHP: December 19, 2019

The Moore Fabric Company Plant is a historic industrial complex at 45-47 Washington Street in Pawtucket, Rhode Island. The complex consists of five buildings built between 1878 and 1954, primarily for the purpose of manufacturing textiles with elastic components, although the oldest structure was built as a school. The complex was listed on the National Register of Historic Places in 2019. Plans have been laid to convert the property to residential use.

== Description and history ==
The former Moore Fabric Company Plant is located in the predominantly residential Woodville area southwest of downtown Pawtucket, on the west side of Washington Street. The complex is dominated by three large brick weave sheds, and includes a late 19th-century wood-frame schoolhouse with additions, and a boiler house.

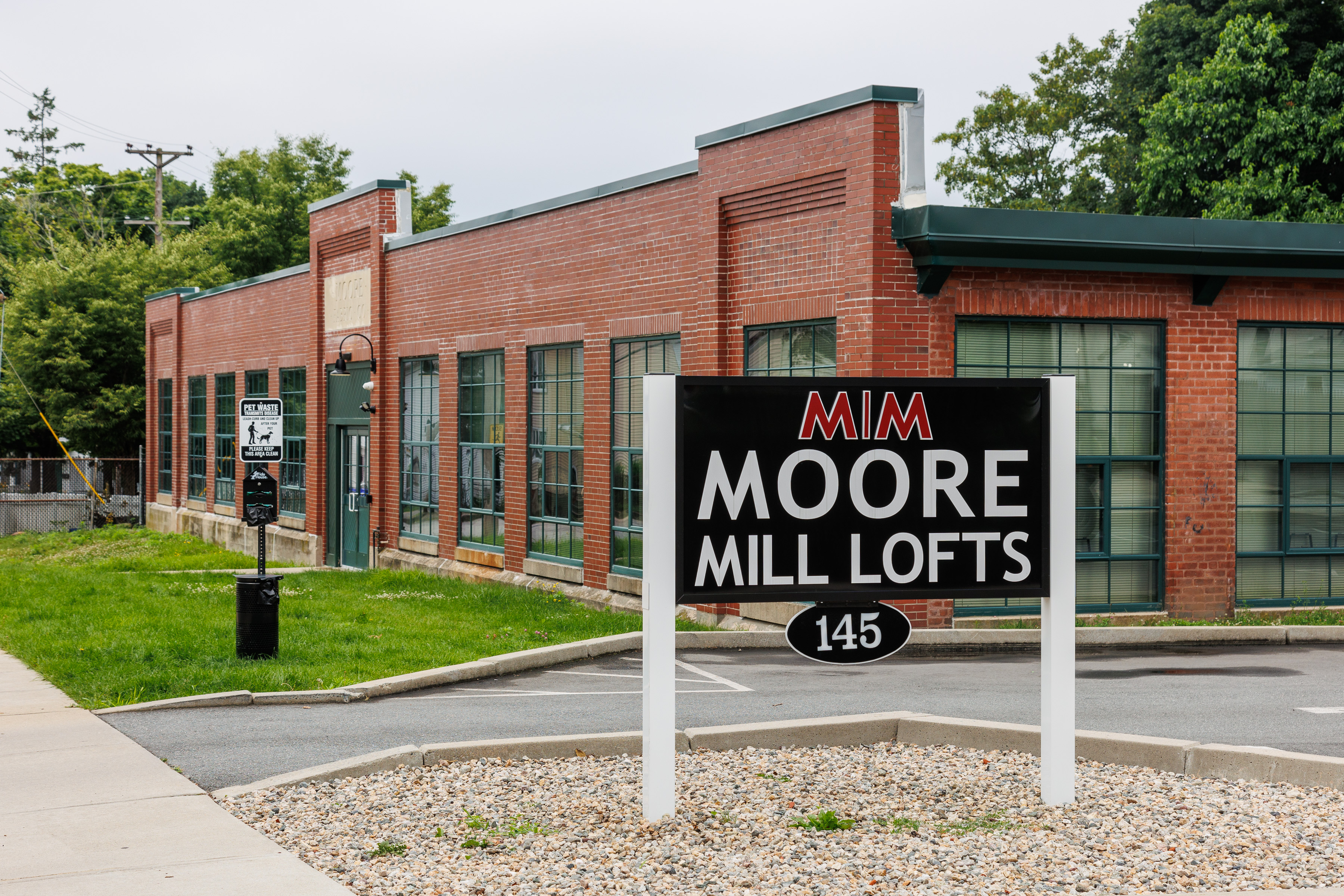
Converted to "Moore Mill Lofts"

The oldest building on the property is the schoolhouse, a modest single-story frame structure built in 1878. It was used as a school until 1903, and was purchased by a cigarmaker in 1909. In 1917 the property was acquired by Glendana Silk Company, which constructed the first weave shed and boiler, and manufactured silk fabric. The school was attached to this shed by a covered way for use as a shipping facility. Glendana failed in 1920, and the plant was bought by John Moore. Continuing at first with the manufacture of silks, Moore later began to specialize in the manufacture of rubberized latex thread, using a 1925 patent for the creation of such thread that could be placed on bobbins and woven with minimal risk of breakage. These materials came to be used in undergarments and medical fabrics. The firm remained in operation until 1954. The plant was thereafter used as a warehouse and shipping facility into the 1970s.

== See also ==
- National Register of Historic Places listings in Pawtucket, Rhode Island
