= Joseph Spaulding House =

Historic house in Rhode Island, United States

- U.S. National Register of Historic Places
- U.S. Historic district – Contributing property
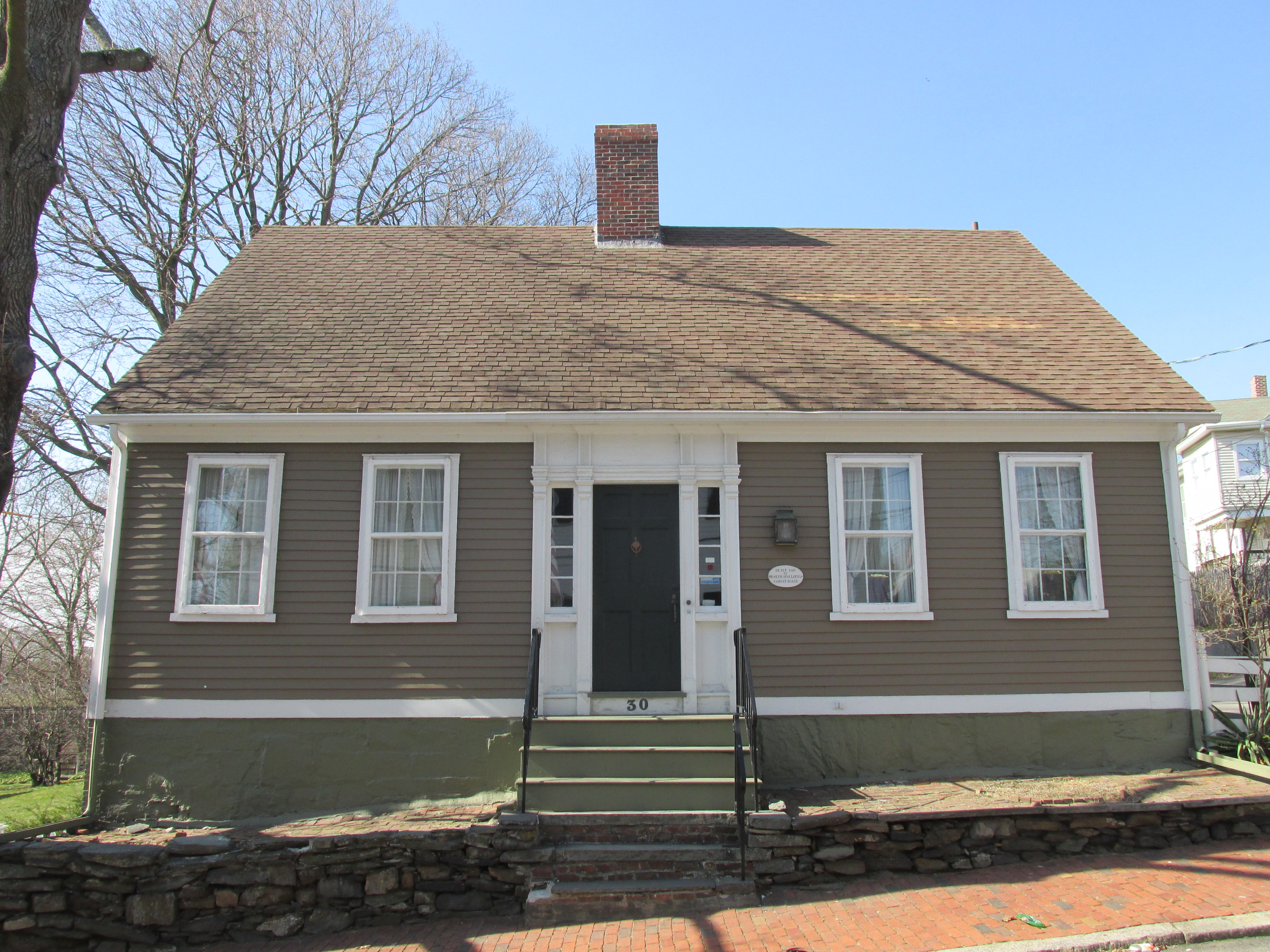

- Location within Rhode Island Location within the United States
- Location: Pawtucket, Rhode Island
- Coordinates: 41°52′26″N 71°22′50″W
- Area: less than one acre
- Built: 1828
- Part of: South Street Historic District (ID83003864)
- NRHP reference No.: 76000005

Significant dates
- Added to NRHP: October 22, 1976
- Designated CP: November 18, 1983

The Joseph Spaulding House is an historic house at 30 Fruit Street in Pawtucket, Rhode Island. It is a 1 1/2-story wood-frame structure, five bays wide, with a side-gable roof and a large central chimney. It is set in a hillside, and its basement, made of fieldstone, is used as an additional story. Built in 1828, with an ell added in 1850, it is one of the city's least-altered and best-preserved Federal style houses.

The house was listed on the National Register of Historic Places in 1976.

== See also ==
- National Register of Historic Places listings in Pawtucket, Rhode Island
