= South Street Historic District (Pawtucket, Rhode Island) =

Historic district in Rhode Island, United States

- U.S. National Register of Historic Places
- U.S. Historic district
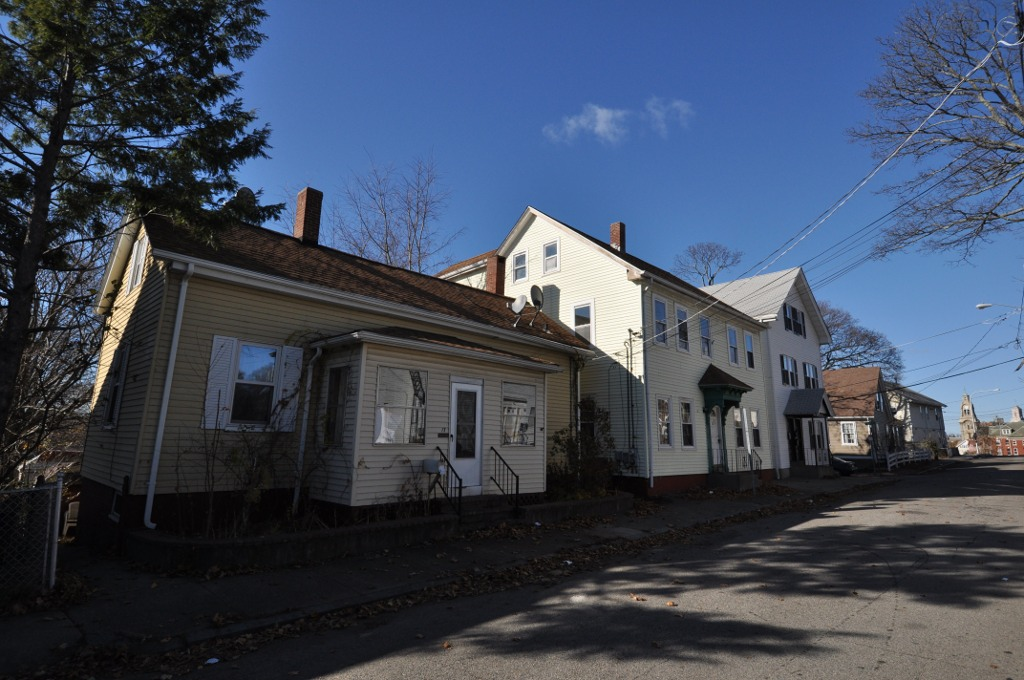
- Houses on South Street

- Location within Rhode Island Location within the United States
- Location: Pawtucket, Rhode Island
- Coordinates: 41.873028°N 71.378971°W
- Area: 4 acres (1.6 ha)
- Architectural style: Greek Revival, Italianate
- MPS: Pawtucket MRA
- NRHP reference No.: 83003864
- Added to NRHP: November 18, 1983

The South Street Historic District encompasses a small enclave of 19th-century houses on South Street between Meadow and Fruit Streets in Pawtucket, Rhode Island. Covering two blocks of South Street, it includes 21 buildings, of which 15 were built before 1850, and the rest before 1900. Most of the houses are 1 1/2-story wood-frame structures, with many of the larger ones showing signs of having once been of a similar size. The most common architectural style is the Greek Revival, with notable examples at 19-21 and 37-39 South Street.

The district was listed on the National Register of Historic Places in 1983. The separately-listed Joseph Spaulding House is a contributing element of the district.

== See also ==
- National Register of Historic Places listings in Pawtucket, Rhode Island
