= Standard Paper Box Corporation =

- U.S. National Register of Historic Places
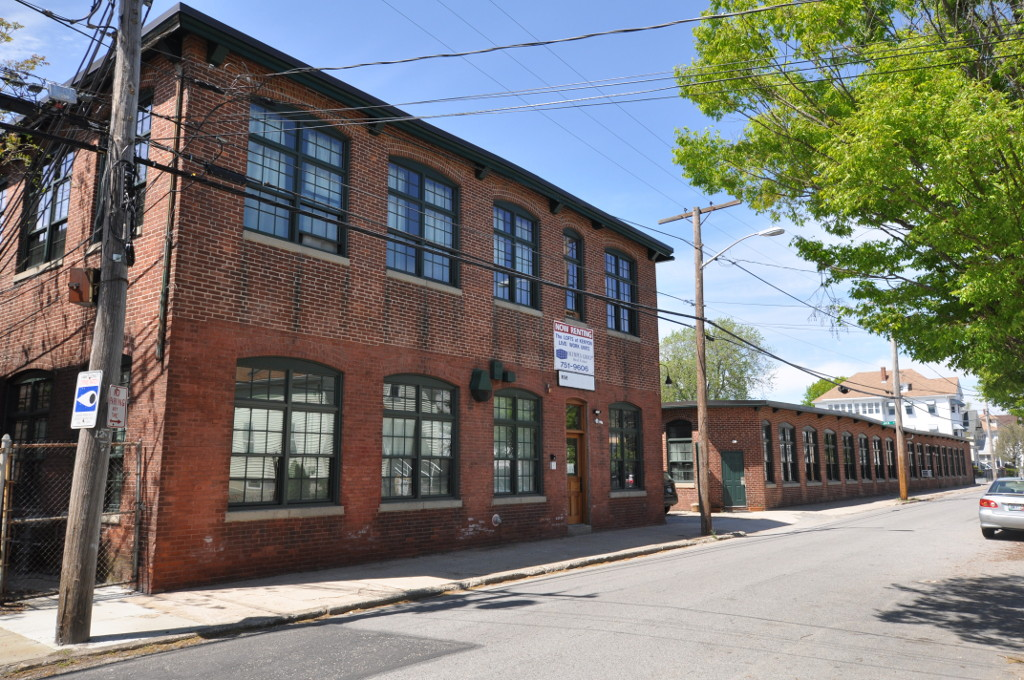

- Location within Rhode Island Location within the United States
- Location: 110 Kenyon Ave., Pawtucket, Rhode Island
- Coordinates: 41°53′21″N 71°21′57″W
- Area: 1.75 acres (0.71 ha)
- Built: 1914
- Architectural style: Early Commercial
- NRHP reference No.: 15000055
- Added to NRHP: February 24, 2015

The Standard Paper Box Corporation is a historic industrial complex at 110 Kenyon Street in Pawtucket, Rhode Island. The complex consists of four buildings built between 1914 and 1971, primarily for the purpose of manufacturing boxes for the jewelry industry that was a major economic force in Pawtucket and adjacent Attleboro, Massachusetts. The buildings are notable in the historical development of power systems for industrial facilities, retaining in situ elements of several generations of electro-mechanical power infrastructure. The main building, now a two-story brick structure was built in 1914 by the Standard Paper Box Corporation, which operated on the premises until 1933, enlarging it with a second building in the 1920s. The complex was purchased by Donald Young, Inc., which expanded the premises again, raising the main building from one to two stories, enlarging the second building, and constructing a third in 1939. That company also produced boxes, operating until 1971.

The complex was listed on the National Register of Historic Places in 2015.

== See also ==
- National Register of Historic Places listings in Pawtucket, Rhode Island
