= National Register of Historic Places listings in Pawtucket, Rhode Island =

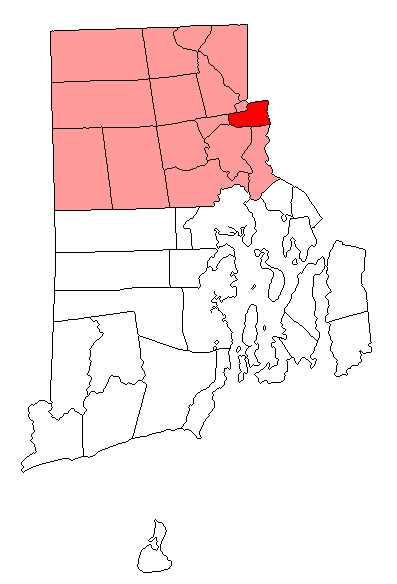
Location of Pawtucket in Providence County, Rhode Island

This is a list of the National Register of Historic Places listings in Pawtucket, Rhode Island.

This is intended to be a complete list of the properties and districts on the National Register of Historic Places in Pawtucket, Rhode Island, United States. Latitude and longitude coordinates are provided for many National Register properties and districts; these locations may be seen together in an online map.

There are 436 properties and districts listed on the National Register in Providence County, including 15 National Historic Landmarks. The city of Pawtucket is the location of 58 these properties and districts, including 1 National Historic Landmark; they are listed here. Properties and districts located in the county's other municipalities are listed separately. Two Pawtucket listings, the Blackstone Canal and the Conant Thread-Coats & Clark Mill Complex District, extend into other parts of Providence County, and appear on multiple lists.

Contents: Counties in Rhode Island

Bristol | Kent | Newport | Providence (Pawtucket | Providence (city) | Woonsocket) | Washington

This National Park Service list is complete through NPS recent listings posted May 1, 2026.

== Current listings ==
	Name on the Register	Image	Date listed	Location	City or town	Description
1	John E. Adams House	John E. Adams House	November 18, 1983 (#83003804)	11 Allen Ave. 41°52′59″N 71°22′38″W	Pawtucket	
2	Art's Auto	Art's Auto	December 15, 1978 (#78000071)	5-7 Lonsdale Ave. 41°52′07″N 71°23′56″W	Pawtucket	
3	Blackstone Canal	Blackstone Canal	May 6, 1971 (#71000030)	From Steeple and Promenade Sts. in Providence to the Massachusetts border in North Smithfield; 41°55′16″N 71°25′21″W	Pawtucket, Lincoln, Woonsocket, and North Smithfield	Initial listing extended from Providence, through Pawtucket, and as far north as Lincoln; a 1991 expansion (#91001536) extended it to the state line; the canal itself extended into Worcester County, Massachusetts, where it is the subject of separate listings.
4	Bridge Mill Power Plant	Bridge Mill Power Plant	November 18, 1983 (#83003805)	25 Roosevelt Ave. 41°52′35″N 71°23′04″W	Pawtucket	
5	G.A. Burnham House	G.A. Burnham House	November 18, 1983 (#83003806)	17 Nickerson St. 41°52′58″N 71°23′20″W	Pawtucket	
6	Childs-Brown House	Childs-Brown House	November 18, 1983 (#83003807)	172 Pine St. 41°52′28″N 71°23′23″W	Pawtucket	
7	Church Hill Grammar School	Church Hill Grammar School	April 23, 2010 (#10000165)	81 Park Pl. 41°52′33″N 71°23′16″W	Pawtucket	
8	Church Hill Industrial District	Church Hill Industrial District	August 12, 1982 (#82000135)	Roughly bounded by S. Union, Pine, Baley, Commerce, Main, and Hill Sts. Boundary increase (listed 2/7/2011): 60 Dexter St., 125 Goff Ave., 265 Pine St. 41°52′34″N 71°23′22″W	Pawtucket	
9	Collyer Monument	Collyer Monument	November 18, 1983 (#83003808)	Mineral Spring Park; 41°52′29″N 71°23′35″W	Pawtucket	
10	Conant Thread-Coats & Clark Mill Complex District	Conant Thread-Coats & Clark Mill Complex District	November 18, 1983 (#83003809)	Roughly bounded by Lonsdale Ave., Pine, Conant, Carpenter, and Rand Sts. 41°52′51″N 71°23′53″W	Pawtucket	Extends into Central Falls
11	Lorenzo Crandall House	Lorenzo Crandall House	December 10, 1984 (#78000072)	221 High St. 41°52′53″N 71°23′03″W	Pawtucket	
12	Division Street Bridge	Division Street Bridge	November 18, 1983 (#83003810)	Division St. at the Seekonk River; 41°52′20″N 71°23′06″W	Pawtucket	
13	Donwell's Diner-Worcester Lunch Car Company Diner No. 774	Donwell's Diner-Worcester Lunch Car Company Diner No. 774	October 25, 2021 (#100007075)	560 Mineral Spring Ave. 41°52′22″N 71°24′23″W	Pawtucket	Currently the Lorraine Diner.
14	Downtown Pawtucket Historic District	Downtown Pawtucket Historic District	April 5, 2007 (#06001227)	Roughly bounded by Broad St., Grant St., High St., the East Ave. Extension, and Main St. 41°52′43″N 71°23′05″W	Pawtucket	
15	Exchange Street Historic District	Exchange Street Historic District	September 6, 2002 (#02000952)	Roughly along Exchange, Front and Fountain Sts. 41°52′47″N 71°22′50″W	Pawtucket	
16	Fifth Ward Wardroom	Fifth Ward Wardroom	November 18, 1983 (#83003817)	47 Mulberry St. 41°52′27″N 71°23′36″W	Pawtucket	
17	Fire Station No. 4	Fire Station No. 4	November 18, 1983 (#83003819)	474 Broadway; 41°53′11″N 71°22′36″W	Pawtucket	
18	First Ward Wardroom	First Ward Wardroom	November 18, 1983 (#83003820)	171 Fountain St. 41°53′04″N 71°22′41″W	Pawtucket	Now a VFW hall.
19	Foster-Payne House	Foster-Payne House	November 18, 1983 (#83003823)	25 Belmont St. 41°51′46″N 71°23′45″W	Pawtucket	
20	Fuller Houses	Fuller Houses	November 18, 1983 (#83003825)	339-341 and 343-345 Broadway; 41°53′04″N 71°22′38″W	Pawtucket	
21	Gately Building	Gately Building	March 20, 2012 (#12000135)	335 Main St. 41°52′09″N 71°23′21″W	Pawtucket	
22	Gilbane's Service Center Building	Gilbane's Service Center Building	November 18, 1983 (#83003827)	175-191 Pawtucket Ave. 41°52′09″N 71°23′21″W	Pawtucket	
23	Hope Webbing Company Mill	Hope Webbing Company Mill	April 19, 2006 (#06000297)	999-1005 Main St. 41°51′46″N 71°24′04″W	Pawtucket	
24	Jenckes Spinning Company	Jenckes Spinning Company	January 25, 2018 (#100002059)	Weeden, Barton, Pine, Lily Pond & Conant Sts. 41°52′43″N 71°23′35″W	Pawtucket	
25	Louis Kotzow House	Louis Kotzow House	November 18, 1983 (#83003829)	641 East Ave. 41°51′37″N 71°23′24″W	Pawtucket	
26	Leroy Theatre	Leroy Theatre	August 4, 1983 (#83000181)	66 Broad St. 41°52′48″N 71°23′15″W	Pawtucket	Demolished in 1996.
27	Liberty Arming the Patriot	Liberty Arming the Patriot	October 19, 2001 (#01000467)	Park Place; 41°52′37″N 71°23′14″W	Pawtucket	
28	Main Street Bridge	Main Street Bridge	November 18, 1983 (#83003832)	Main St. at Pawtucket Falls; 41°52′35″N 71°23′02″W	Pawtucket	
29	John Carter Minkins House		April 7, 2025 (#100011656)	345 Glenwood Avenue; 41°51′36″N 71°23′46″W	Pawtucket	
30	Mitchell-Arnold House	Mitchell-Arnold House	November 18, 1983 (#83003833)	41 Waldo St. 41°51′58″N 71°23′27″W	Pawtucket	
31	Modern Diner	Modern Diner	October 19, 1978 (#78000002)	364 East Ave. 41°52′08″N 71°23′13″W	Pawtucket	
32	Nathaniel Montgomery House	Nathaniel Montgomery House	January 19, 1984 (#84002030)	178 High St. 41°52′51″N 71°23′05″W	Pawtucket	
33	Moore Fabric Company Plant	Moore Fabric Company Plant	December 19, 2019 (#100004785)	45-47 Washington St. 41°52′13″N 71°23′35″W	Pawtucket	
34	Old Slater Mill	Old Slater Mill	November 13, 1966 (#66000001)	Roosevelt Ave. 41°52′39″N 71°22′57″W	Pawtucket	
35	Pawtucket Armory	Pawtucket Armory	November 18, 1983 (#83003836)	172 Exchange St. 41°52′49″N 71°22′49″W	Pawtucket	
36	Pawtucket City Hall	Pawtucket City Hall	November 18, 1983 (#83003838)	137 Roosevelt Ave. 41°52′45″N 71°22′57″W	Pawtucket	
37	Pawtucket Congregational Church	Pawtucket Congregational Church	September 18, 1978 (#78000004)	40 and 56 Walcott St. 41°52′36″N 71°22′54″W	Pawtucket	Currently (2012) the church is the home to The Temple of Restoration Pentecostal Church.
38	Pawtucket Elks Lodge Building	Pawtucket Elks Lodge Building	November 18, 1983 (#83003840)	27 Exchange St. 41°52′47″N 71°23′08″W	Pawtucket	
39	Pawtucket Post Office	Pawtucket Post Office	April 30, 1976 (#76000226)	56 High St. 41°52′42″N 71°23′04″W	Pawtucket	
40	Pawtucket Times Building	Pawtucket Times Building	November 18, 1983 (#83003842)	23 Exchange St. 41°52′47″N 71°23′09″W	Pawtucket	
41	Pawtucket West High School	Pawtucket West High School	November 18, 1983 (#83003845)	485 East Ave. 41°51′55″N 71°23′19″W	Pawtucket	
42	Charles Payne House	Charles Payne House	November 18, 1983 (#83003847)	25 Brown St. 41°52′17″N 71°23′29″W	Pawtucket	
43	Phillips Insulated Wire Company Complex	Phillips Insulated Wire Company Complex	March 19, 2004 (#04000194)	413 Central Ave. 41°53′04″N 71°21′59″W	Pawtucket	
44	Pitcher-Goff House	Pitcher-Goff House	June 24, 1976 (#76000001)	58 Walcott St. 41°52′37″N 71°22′49″W	Pawtucket	
45	Potter-Collyer House	Potter-Collyer House	November 18, 1983 (#83003849)	67 Cedar St. 41°52′24″N 71°23′23″W	Pawtucket	
46	Prospect Heights Housing Project	Prospect Heights Housing Project	December 15, 2015 (#15000904)	560 Prospect St. 41°51′41″N 71°22′01″W	Pawtucket	
47	Quality Hill Historic District	Quality Hill Historic District	April 13, 1984 (#84002041)	Roughly bounded by Interstate 95, Cottage, Lyon, Bend, and Potter Sts. 41°52′40″N 71°22′25″W	Pawtucket	
48	Riverside Cemetery	Riverside Cemetery	November 18, 1983 (#83003853)	724 Pleasant St. 41°51′33″N 71°22′56″W	Pawtucket	
49	St. John the Baptist Church	St. John the Baptist Church	November 18, 1983 (#83003855)	68 Slater St. 41°52′24″N 71°23′52″W	Pawtucket	
50	St. Mary's Church of the Immaculate Conception Complex	St. Mary's Church of the Immaculate Conception Complex	November 18, 1983 (#83003856)	103 Pine St. 41°52′17″N 71°23′21″W	Pawtucket	
51	St. Paul's Church	St. Paul's Church	November 18, 1983 (#83003857)	50 Park Pl. 41°52′32″N 71°23′14″W	Pawtucket	
52	Deborah Cook Sayles Public Library	Deborah Cook Sayles Public Library	December 6, 1975 (#75000002)	13 Summer St. 41°52′44″N 71°23′07″W	Pawtucket	
53	Scholze-Sayles House	Scholze-Sayles House	November 18, 1983 (#83003859)	625 East Ave. 41°51′39″N 71°23′21″W	Pawtucket	
54	Slater Park	Slater Park	June 30, 1976 (#76000004)	Armistice Boulevard; 41°52′07″N 71°20′43″W	Pawtucket	
55	South Street Historic District	South Street Historic District	November 18, 1983 (#83003864)	Roughly South Street between Meadow and Fruit Sts. 41°52′17″N 71°22′47″W	Pawtucket	
56	Joseph Spaulding House	Joseph Spaulding House	October 22, 1976 (#76000005)	30 Fruit St. 41°52′26″N 71°22′50″W	Pawtucket	
57	Standard Paper Box Corporation	Standard Paper Box Corporation	February 24, 2015 (#15000055)	110 Kenyon Ave. 41°53′21″N 71°21′57″W	Pawtucket	
58	Trinity Church	Trinity Church	January 13, 1972 (#72000003)	50 Main St. 41°52′33″N 71°22′52″W	Pawtucket	Burned down in 2005

== See also ==
- List of National Historic Landmarks in Rhode Island
- National Register of Historic Places listings in Rhode Island
