= Louis Kotzow House =

Historic house in Rhode Island, United States

- U.S. National Register of Historic Places
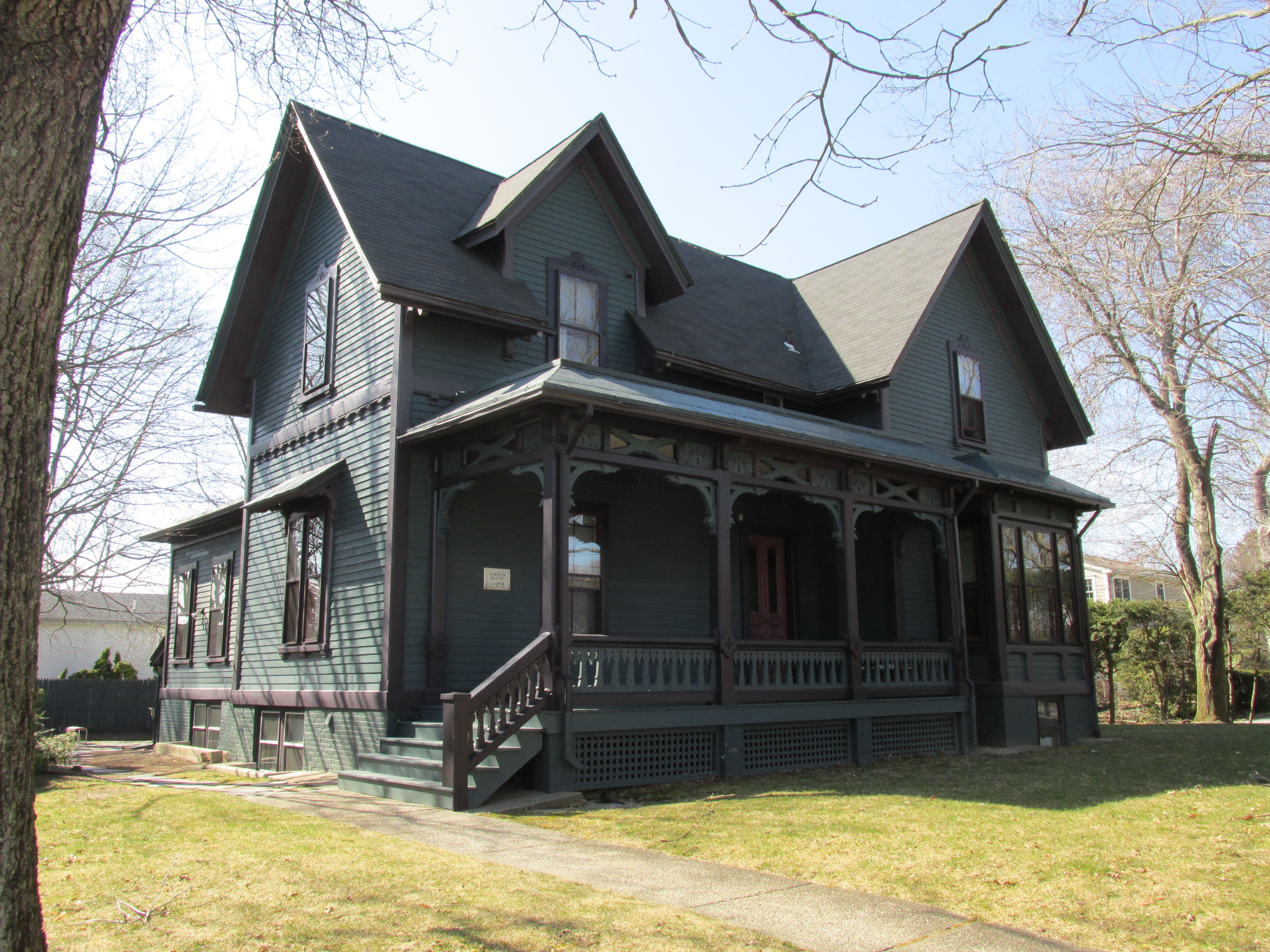
- Louis Kotzow House

- Location within Rhode Island Location within the United States
- Location: 641 East Avenue, Pawtucket, Rhode Island
- Coordinates: 41°51′37″N 71°23′24″W
- Built: 1875
- Architectural style: Gothic
- MPS: Pawtucket MRA
- NRHP reference No.: 83003829
- Added to NRHP: November 18, 1983

The Louis Kotzow House is a historic house in Pawtucket, Rhode Island. It is a 1 1/2-story wood-frame structure, laid out in an L shape. Its exterior is visually busy, with numerous projecting dormer and gable sections, and elaborate woodwork, including bracketed eaves and applied Stick style woodwork on a projecting bay section. Its porch has a delicate jigsawn railing, with a wooden frieze and decorative arches above. The house, built c. 1875, is one of two (the other is the nearby Scholze–Sayles House) built by the German Land Cooperative Association, which sought to create a German-speaking enclave in the area.

The house was listed on the National Register of Historic Places in 1983.

== See also ==
- National Register of Historic Places listings in Pawtucket, Rhode Island
