= Scholze–Sayles House =

Historic house in Rhode Island, United States

- U.S. National Register of Historic Places
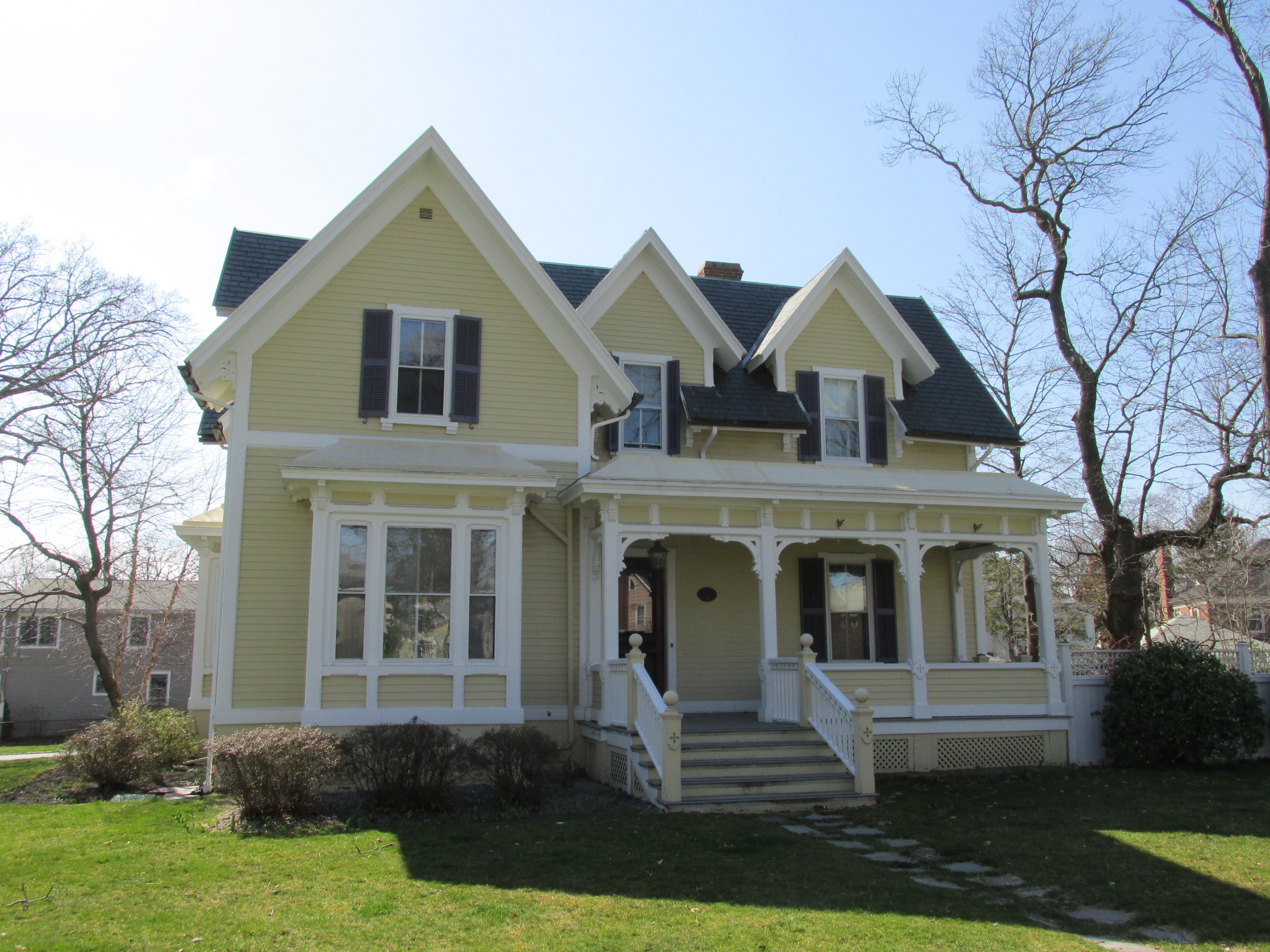
- Scholze–Sayles House

- Location within Rhode Island Location within the United States
- Location: 625 East Avenue, Pawtucket, Rhode Island
- Coordinates: 41°51′37″N 71°23′24″W
- Area: less than one acre
- Built: 1874
- Architectural style: Gothic
- MPS: Pawtucket MRA
- NRHP reference No.: 83003859
- Added to NRHP: November 18, 1983

The Scholze–Sayles House is a historic house in Pawtucket, Rhode Island. It is a 1 1/2-story wood-frame structure, built in 1874–75. It is one of two (the other is the nearby Louis Kotzow House) built by the German Land Cooperative Association, which sought to create a German-speaking enclave in the area. This house is a fine example of Gothic Revival style, and is stylistically similar to the Kotzow House, with a busy exterior that has numerous projecting and gabled sections, and Stick style decoration on a bay window. The interior was extensively redone in 1935 in a Federal Revival style by architect Albert Harkness.

The house was listed on the National Register of Historic Places in 1983.

== See also ==
- National Register of Historic Places listings in Pawtucket, Rhode Island
