= Charles Payne House =

Historic house in Rhode Island, United States

- U.S. National Register of Historic Places
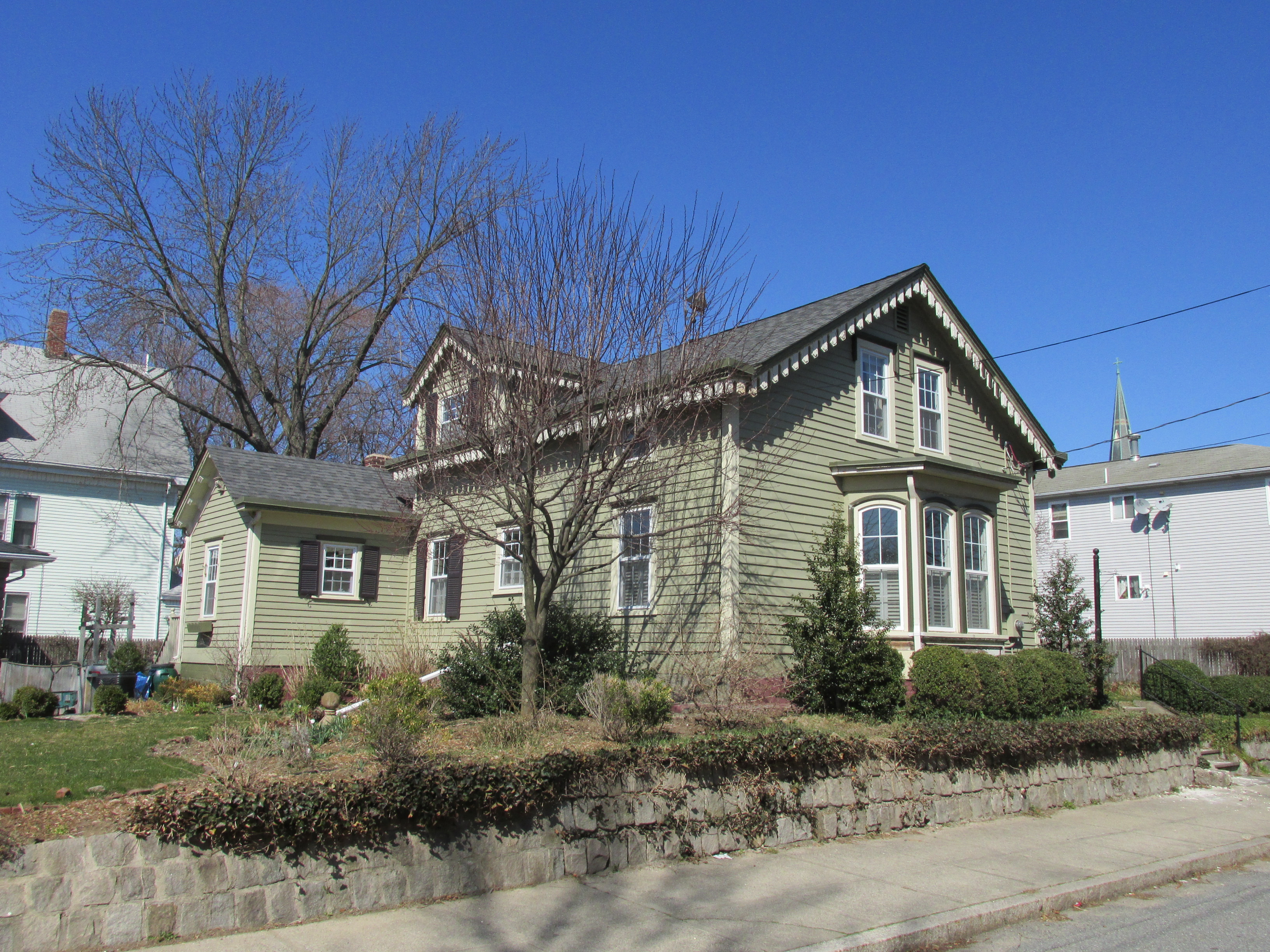
- Charles Payne House

- Location within Rhode Island Location within the United States
- Location: 25 Brown Street, Pawtucket, Rhode Island
- Coordinates: 41°52′17″N 71°23′29″W
- Built: 1855
- Architectural style: Gothic, Italianate
- MPS: Pawtucket MRA
- NRHP reference No.: 83003847
- Added to NRHP: November 18, 1983

The Charles Payne House is an historic site in Pawtucket, Rhode Island. The house was built in 1855–56 by Charles Payne and later expanded with the addition of two ells and a porch. The 1 1/2-story Gothic-Italianate vernacular cottage is architecturally significant as a 19th-century vernacular cottage in a picturesque setting. Though the round-head picket fence and entry gates were later removed, the property retains a large shaded garden on with ample street frontage. The Charles Payne House was added to the National Register of Historic Places in 1983.

== History ==
The house was constructed by Charles Payne, an engraver who founded the firm of Payne & Taylor for calico printers in 1849. In 1849, Payne began to purchase parcels of land that he would later construct the house on. The main block of the house was erected in 1855–1856 and later expanded with a north wing in the mid-1870s. The final major addition was an ell on the west side of the house, the date of construction occurred prior to 1902. Though the house has been the subject of some alterations, these changes are largely inconspicuous.

== Design ==
The Charles Payne House is a 1 1/2-story Gothic-Italianate vernacular cottage that has a spacious garden founded on the site of a long-removed house. The house's gable end faces the street with a rear ell and the other ell perpendicular to the main block on the west side. Centered on the east end of the roof is a cross gable which is visually offset by the dormer on the west. The house has a small gable-roofed vestibule on the east side, aligned underneath the cross-gable. The rear ell has an attached porch that spans its length. A single story bay hexagonal bay window protrudes from the facade. The distinguishing feature of the Payne house is the wood trim exterior, consisting of hood mould on the paired windows on the south, four kinds of bargeboards and bracketed cornices on the rear ell's east side. The interior of the Charles Payne House is not covered in detail by any survey, but has three mantelpieces on the first floor, two displaying Gothic Revival influence in their wooden designs and the third, located in the rear ell, made of grey marble with a round-head opening. Though not mentioned in the nomination, a photo shows one of the wooden mantlepieces filled with brick and rendered unusable at the time. The setting of the house was important to the National Register nomination, which specifically highlighted its shaded garden and fencing. At the time of the nomination, an ornamental round head picket fence surrounded the property and access was through a double-leaf lattice work gate. By 2013, the picket fence and entrance gate had been removed, but the property still retains the street frontage for its garden.

== Significance ==
According to the National Register of Historic Places, the Charles Payne house is architecturally significance as an "unusually picturesque and well-preserved example of the small vernacular cottages erected during the middle years of the nineteenth-century in Pawtucket". The nominated property included the Charles Payne house, the surrounding yard, fence and garden, all of which contributed to the picturesque setting of the nomination. It was added to the National Register of Historic Places in 1983.

== See also ==
- National Register of Historic Places listings in Pawtucket, Rhode Island
