= Exchange Street Historic District (Pawtucket, Rhode Island) =

Historic district in Rhode Island, United States

- U.S. National Register of Historic Places
- U.S. Historic district
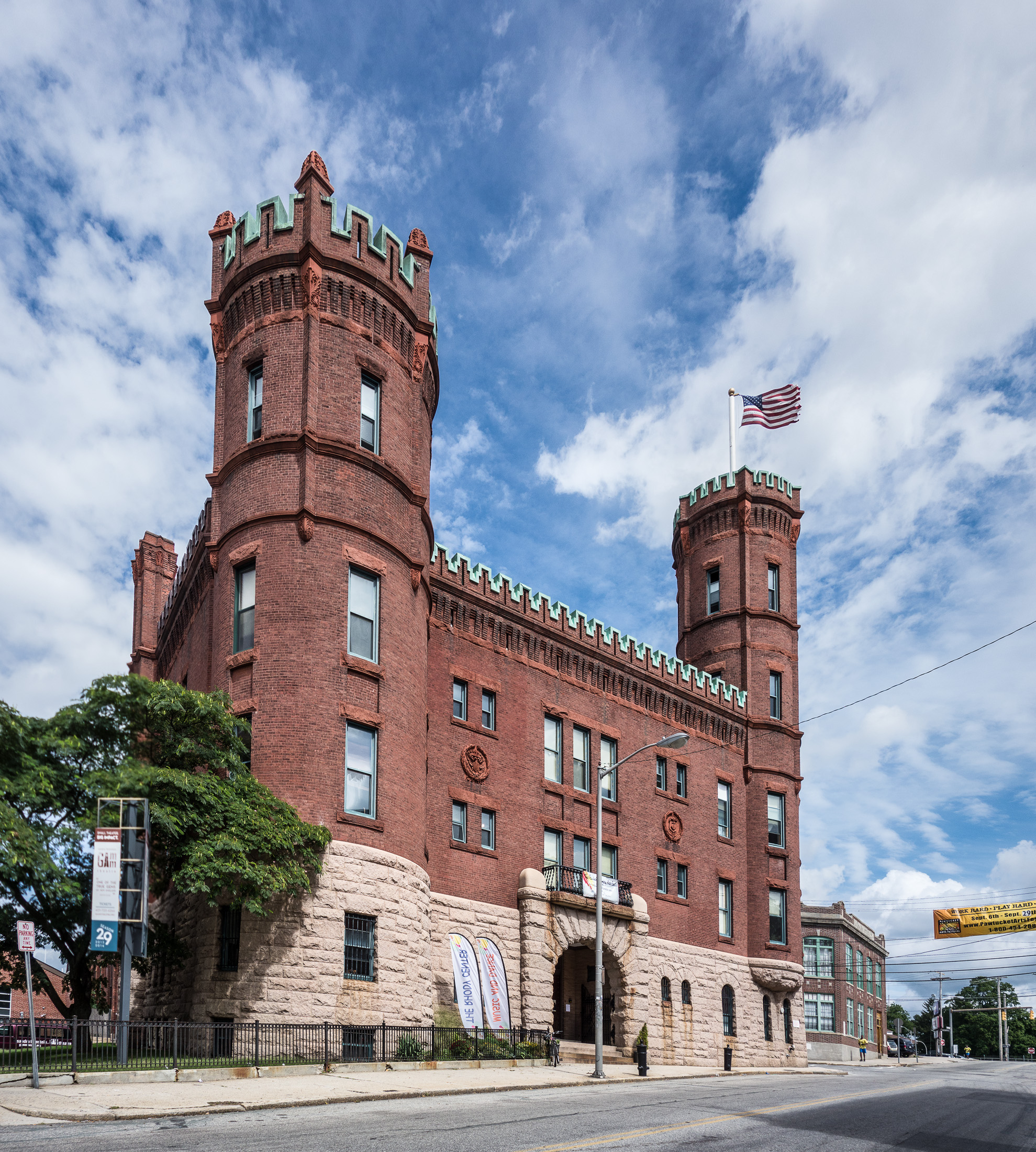
- The Pawtucket Armory building

- Location within Rhode Island Location within the United States
- Location: Pawtucket, Rhode Island
- Coordinates: 41°52′47″N 71°22′50″W
- Area: 10.5 acres (4.2 ha)
- Built: 1874
- Architect: Stone & Carpenter; William R. Walker & Son; Monahan & Meikle
- Architectural style: Colonial Revival, Romanesque
- NRHP reference No.: 02000952
- Added to NRHP: September 6, 2002

The Exchange Street Historic District is an industrial and civic historic district roughly along Exchange, Front and Fountain Streets in Pawtucket, Rhode Island. The 10.5-acre (4.2 ha) area is located just north of Pawtucket's downtown, and includes seven buildings and the Exchange Street Bridge, which spans the Blackstone River. The seven buildings are sandwiched between the river to the west, Broadway to the east, Blackstone Avenue to the north, and Front and Exchange Streets on the south. The most prominent buildings in the district are the 1926 William E. Tolman High School, sited high above the river just north of Exchange Street, and the Pawtucket Armory, built in 1895 and featuring crenellated towers. South of Exchange Street stand several mill buildings dating as far back as 1874.

The district was added to the National Register of Historic Places in 2002.

== See also ==
- National Register of Historic Places listings in Pawtucket, Rhode Island
