= Fuller Houses =

Historic house in Rhode Island, United States

- U.S. National Register of Historic Places
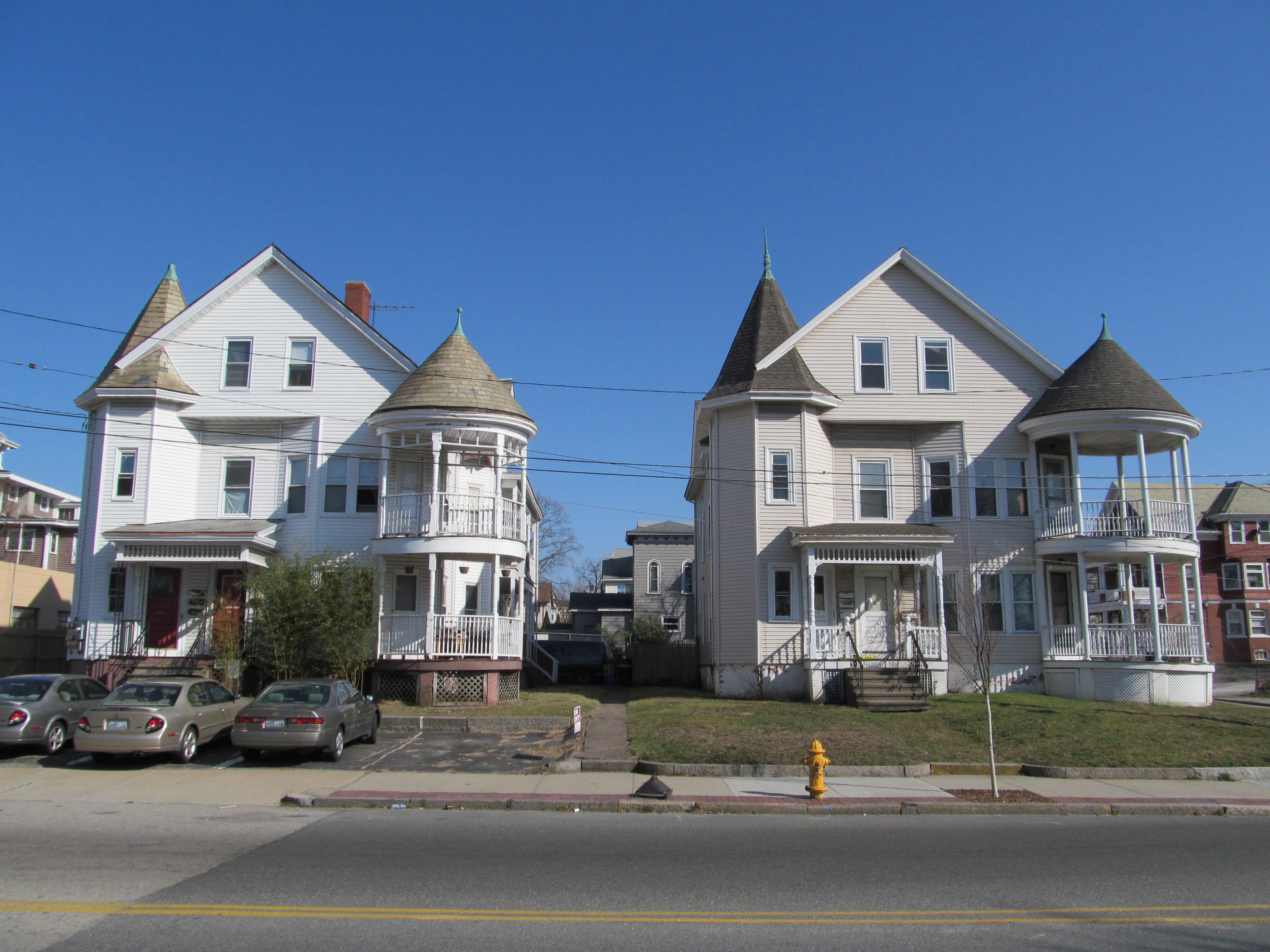
- Fuller Houses

- Location within Rhode Island Location within the United States
- Location: 339–341 and 343–345 Broadway, Pawtucket, Rhode Island
- Coordinates: 41°53′4″N 71°22′38″W
- Built: 1896–1897
- Architectural style: Queen Anne
- MPS: Pawtucket MRA
- NRHP reference No.: 83003825
- Added to NRHP: November 18, 1983

The Fuller Houses are two historic homes at 339–341 and 343–345 Broadway in Pawtucket, Rhode Island, United States. Constructed in 1896–1897, the two Queen Anne-styled homes were constructed as rental properties for the Fuller family and are believed to have originally been identical in construction. The 2 1/2-story houses are marked by an octagonal bay which contains the front staircase and a large two-story porch projecting almost completely from the house itself. For the National Register of Historic Places nomination only a single unit was examined, but the identical unit below is believed to have undergone minimal alterations. The other house, 343–345 Broadway, was not surveyed, but has been more seriously modified to allow for four apartment units. The Fuller Houses are architecturally significant as well-preserved and well-detailed Queen Anne-styled apartment flats. The Fuller Houses were added to the National Register of Historic Places in 1983.

== History ==
The Fuller Houses were constructed in 1896–1897 for Susan E. Fuller. Fuller's husband, Charles H. Fuller, operated a successful jewelry findings firm. The Fullers owned the houses until 1915, and intended to use them as rental properties. The only member of the Fuller family to reside in one of the houses, specifically 341 Broadway, was Alice G. Fuller beginning in either 1911 or 1912. The houses are positioned to be prominently viewed from their location on the east side of U.S Route 1 and from northbound traffic on Interstate 95. Though not originally placed in a location of such prominence, the construction through the heart of Pawtucket greatly increased the visibility of these "I-95 landmarks".

== Design ==
The Fuller Houses are originally believed to have been constructed as identical 2 1/2-story Queen Anne-styled homes with both having their gable-ends facing the street. The southern flank of the building is visually broken up by a two-story bay window with a gabled peak. A semi-octagonal bay on the northern corner of the houses indicates the position of the front staircase. A single-story porch with a shed-roof overhangs the front doorways. A striking feature of the Fuller Houses is the two-story circular porch on the southwest side. The porches are almost removed from the building and topped with a conical roof and ornamented with Queen Anne-style spindle. The exterior walls of the houses are clapboarded and the tops of the gables have simple metal finials.

For the National Register of Historic Places nomination, only the interior of one of the four units was surveyed, the second floor interior of 341 Broadway. This unit is accessed from a spiral staircase leading from the first floor to the attic. The second floor landing has a short foyer before opening to two parlors. The front parlor is said to have had a water fountain which was removed, but the plumbing is said to exist within the floor. The back parlor has a Queen Anne mantel and leads to the dining room with large floor-to-ceiling china closets. Located on the east side of the apartment is the kitchen, pantry and rear staircase. The north part of the apartment contains two bedrooms and a bath. The NRHP nomination states that the alterations to the unit were minimal and it is likely that the same would have been done for the first floor unit. The northern Fuller House, containing 343–345 Broadway, has been more seriously modified because it has been split into four units. In 2013, real estate information for 343 Broadway suggests the expanse of the modifications to the house by listing the property as having 20 rooms, with 8 bedrooms and 5 baths. According to Trulia the house was sold in 2010 for $140,000 and still in the four unit configuration. A three-bay stuccoed garage dating from the 1920s or 1930 is used by 339–341 Broadway.

== Significance ==
The Fuller Houses are architecturally significant as a pair of two well-preserved and well-detailed two-family Queen Anne-style apartment "flat" houses. The Queen Anne-style spindle-work porches are descriptive in the NRHP nomination as the most impressive examples remaining in Pawtucket. The two houses represent an important step in the development of Pawtucket's architectural development and contribute to the city's visual character. The Fuller Houses were added to the National Register of Historic Places in 1983.

== See also ==
- National Register of Historic Places listings in Pawtucket, Rhode Island
