= Gilbane's Service Center Building =

- U.S. National Register of Historic Places
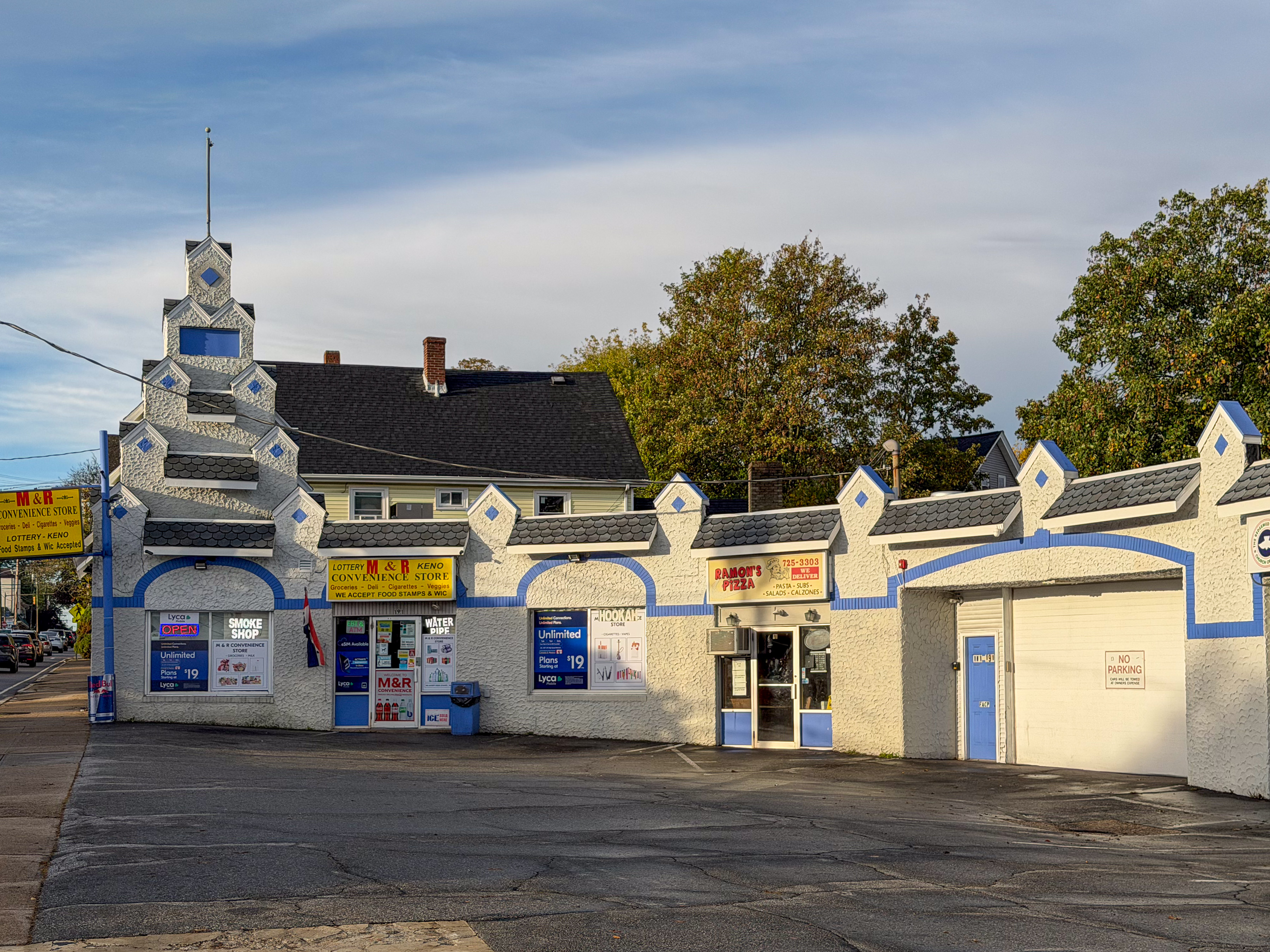
- Gilbane's Service Center Building

- Location within Rhode Island Location within the United States
- Location: Pawtucket, Rhode Island
- Coordinates: 41°52′9″N 71°23′21″W
- Built: 1931
- Architect: Philip Franklin Eddy
- Architectural style: Art Deco
- MPS: Pawtucket MRA
- NRHP reference No.: 83003827
- Added to NRHP: November 18, 1983

Gilbane's Service Center Building is an historic former automotive service station at 175-191 Pawtucket Avenue in Pawtucket, Rhode Island. It is an L-shaped structure, built of concrete blocks and finished in stucco. Its most prominent feature is a whimsical Art Deco tower, built up from one of the corners nearest the street in five stepped tiers. Details from the tower are repeated in the decoration of the roofline above the building's service bays. This building was built c. 1931, and is a second-phase automotive service station, one which offered repair services as well as fuel, and is one of the finest surviving examples of the form in the state.

The building was listed on the National Register of Historic Places in 1983.

Sometime after its register listing, the building was converted to a small shopping plaza, featuring a neighborhood convenience store, pizzeria, and smoke shop.

== See also ==
- National Register of Historic Places listings in Pawtucket, Rhode Island
