= Foster–Payne House =

Historic house in Rhode Island, United States

- U.S. National Register of Historic Places
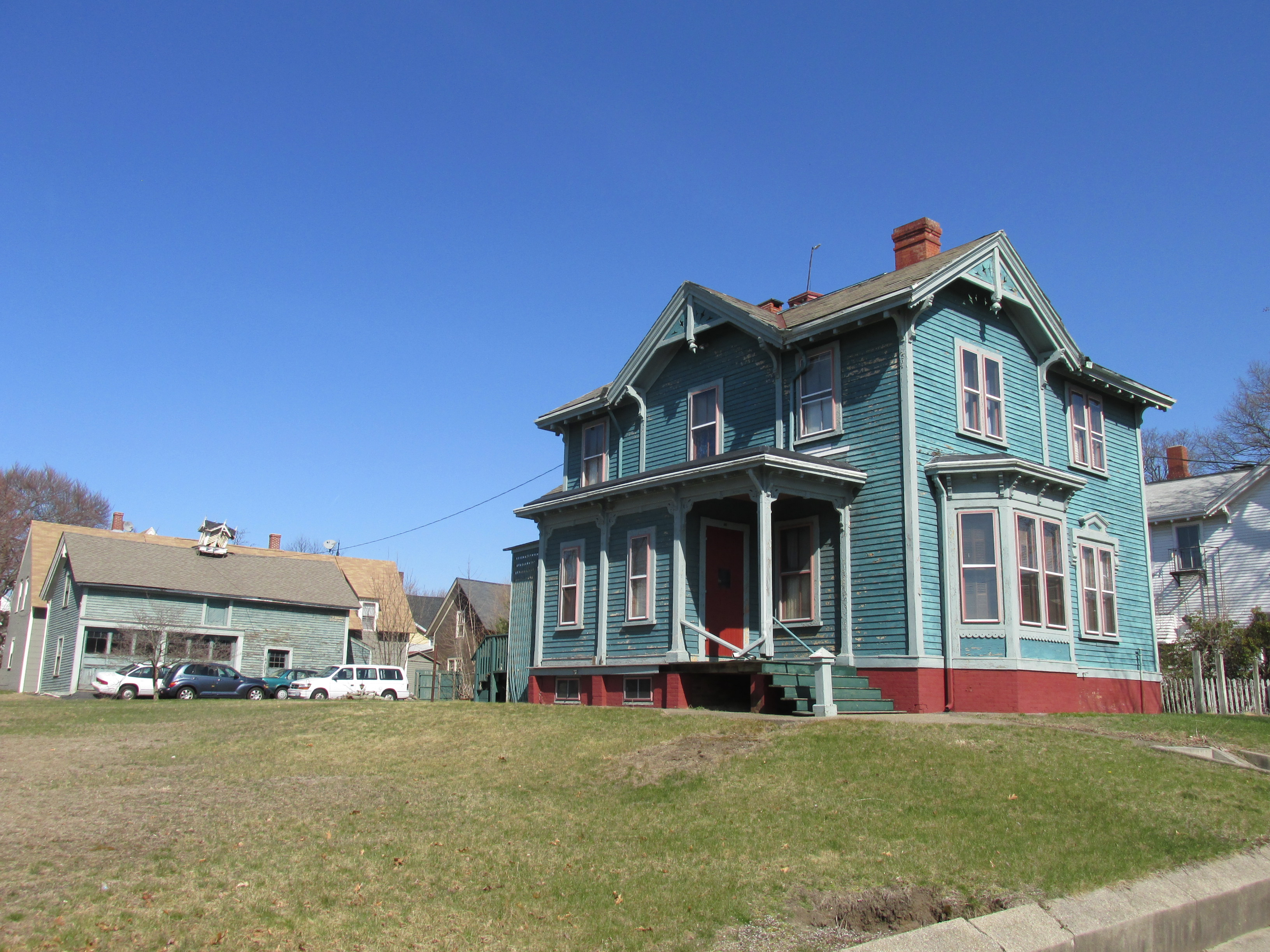
- Foster–Payne House

- Location within Rhode Island Location within the United States
- Location: 25 Belmont Street, Pawtucket, Rhode Island
- Coordinates: 41°51′46″N 71°23′38″W
- Built: 1878
- MPS: Pawtucket MRA
- NRHP reference No.: 83003823
- Added to NRHP: November 18, 1983

The Foster–Payne House is a historic house at 25 Belmont Street in Pawtucket, Rhode Island. Built in 1878, the two-story multi-gabled house is distinguished by its clapboarded and exterior woodwork and opulent parlors in the interior. The property also has a matching carriagehouse with gable roof and cupola. The house was originally constructed and owned by Theodore Waters Foster, but it was sold to George W. Payne in 1882. The Foster–Payne House is architecturally significant as a well-designed and well-preserved late 19th century suburban residence. It was added to the National Register of Historic Places in 1983.

== History ==
The house was built in 1878 for Theodore Waters Foster, born on May 19, 1847, to Chauncey Foster and Ophelia Remington. He was educated in Pawtucket and joined the Rhode Island Cavalry in 1863. He served in the American Civil War under Nathaniel P. Banks in the Red River Campaign. In 1873, he formed a jewelry-manufacturing partnership with Walter E. White and Samuel H. Baily, named White, Foster & Company. After White retired in 1878, the company was renamed Foster & Bailey. During this time, Foster constructed the house and lived in it for a period of four years, commuting to his place of business in Providence, Rhode Island. Foster would continue to be successful in his jewelry manufacturing business and his son, Theodore Clyde Foster, would succeed him upon his death in 1928. In 1882, Theodore Foster sold the home to George W. Payne, the owner of the G. W. Payne & Company.

== Design ==
Constructed in 1878, the Foster–Payne House is a two-story home with a low-pitched multi-gabled roof. The house has a single story open porch on the western side, a kitchen ell that projects from the rear and a single-story bay window that projects from the western bay of the front facade. The house is distinguished by its clapboard exterior and wooden trim under the gable peaks, the window trim and the porch brackets. There are three types of windows used on the house, single and paired one-over-one windows and two-over-two windows.

The small foyer on the western entry porch leads to the main stairhall that features a gently curving staircase with turned balusters and a curving rail. The first floor rooms are arranged in an "L" pattern on the southern and eastern sides with the kitchen placed on the northern ell. The interior of one room, not specified in the NRHP nomination, has been altered with a pressed tin ceiling. The second floor of the home was not described in the NRHP nomination. The interior of the rooms display late Victorian details, with the front parlor having a carved marble mantlepiece, a molded central ceiling medallion and a painted ceiling with scroll-work. The back parlor has a marbleized slate mantlepiece with an over-mounted mirror in a Renaissance Revival frame. On the back edge of the lot is a two-story clapboarded carriagehouse with a Victorian cupola. This structure was not described in the NRHP nomination, but a photo from 2013 shows the cupola has been damaged.

== Significance ==
The house is architecturally significant as a well-designed and well-preserved late 19th century suburban residence, with excellent interior detail and a matching carriagehouse. The area in which it is located was situated in an upper-class suburban area, but since the late 19th-century commercial and industrial buildings have entered the area. The property was added to the National Register of Historic Places in 1983.

== See also ==
- National Register of Historic Places listings in Pawtucket, Rhode Island
