= Cato Hill Historic District =

Historic district in Rhode Island, United States

Coordinates: 42°00′21″N 71°30′58″W

- U.S. National Register of Historic Places
- U.S. Historic district
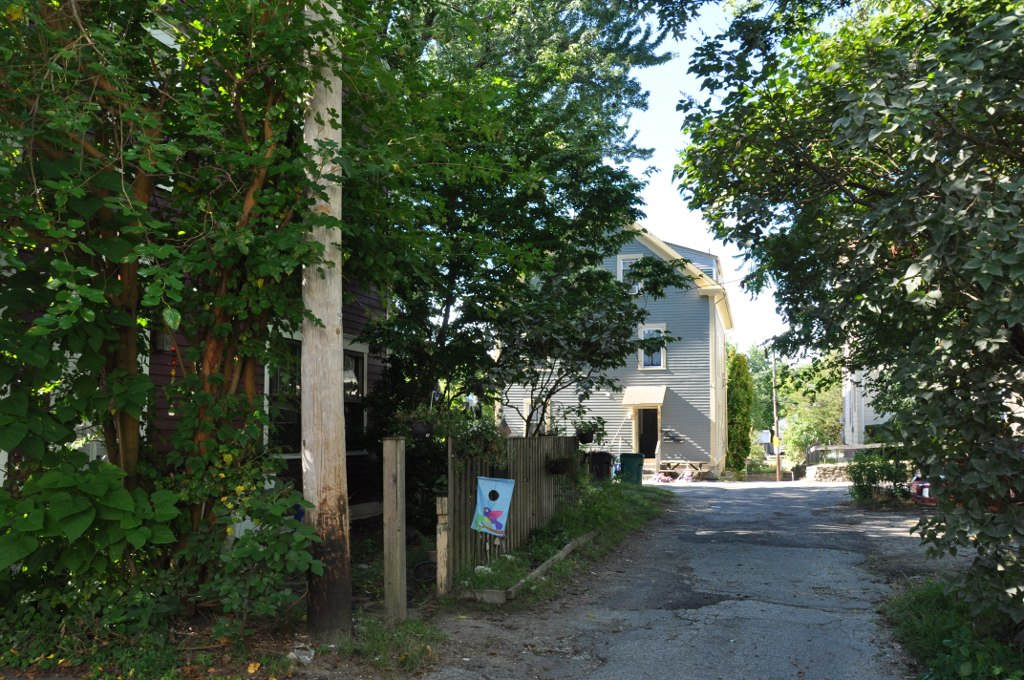
- Clarkin Lane

- Location within Rhode Island Location within the United States
- Location: Woonsocket, Rhode Island
- Architectural style: Greek Revival, Queen Anne, Federal
- MPS: Woonsocket MRA (AD)
- NRHP reference No.: 76002255
- Added to NRHP: August 10, 1976

The Cato Hill Historic District is a residential historic district (United States) in central Woonsocket, Rhode Island. It consists of about 2-1/2 blocks of Church and Cato Streets, as well as the streets crossing them (Clarkin Lane and Boyden Street). The area, located on a hill just above Woonsocket's downtown area, is a densely populated area built primarily between 1838 and 1875, during Woonsocket's growth as a major textile processing center. Cato Hill is named for Cato Aldrich, an African American who purchased the land from the Arnolds who founded Woonsocket. The houses of the district exhibit vernacular forms of the architectural styles popular in the mid-19th century.

The district was listed on the National Register of Historic Places in 1976.

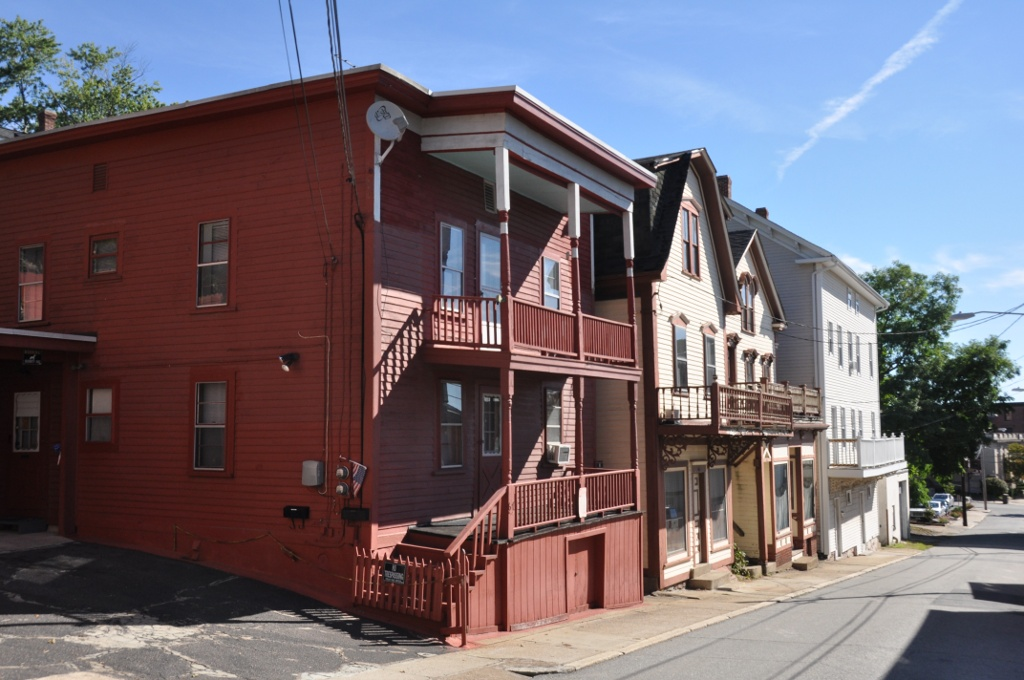
Cato Street view

== See also ==
- National Register of Historic Places listings in Providence County, Rhode Island
