= Thomas J. Gould =

American architect (1849–1923)

Thomas James Gould
- Born: May 23, 1849; Providence, Rhode Island
- Died: September 3, 1923 (aged 74); Newport, Rhode Island
- Occupation: Architect

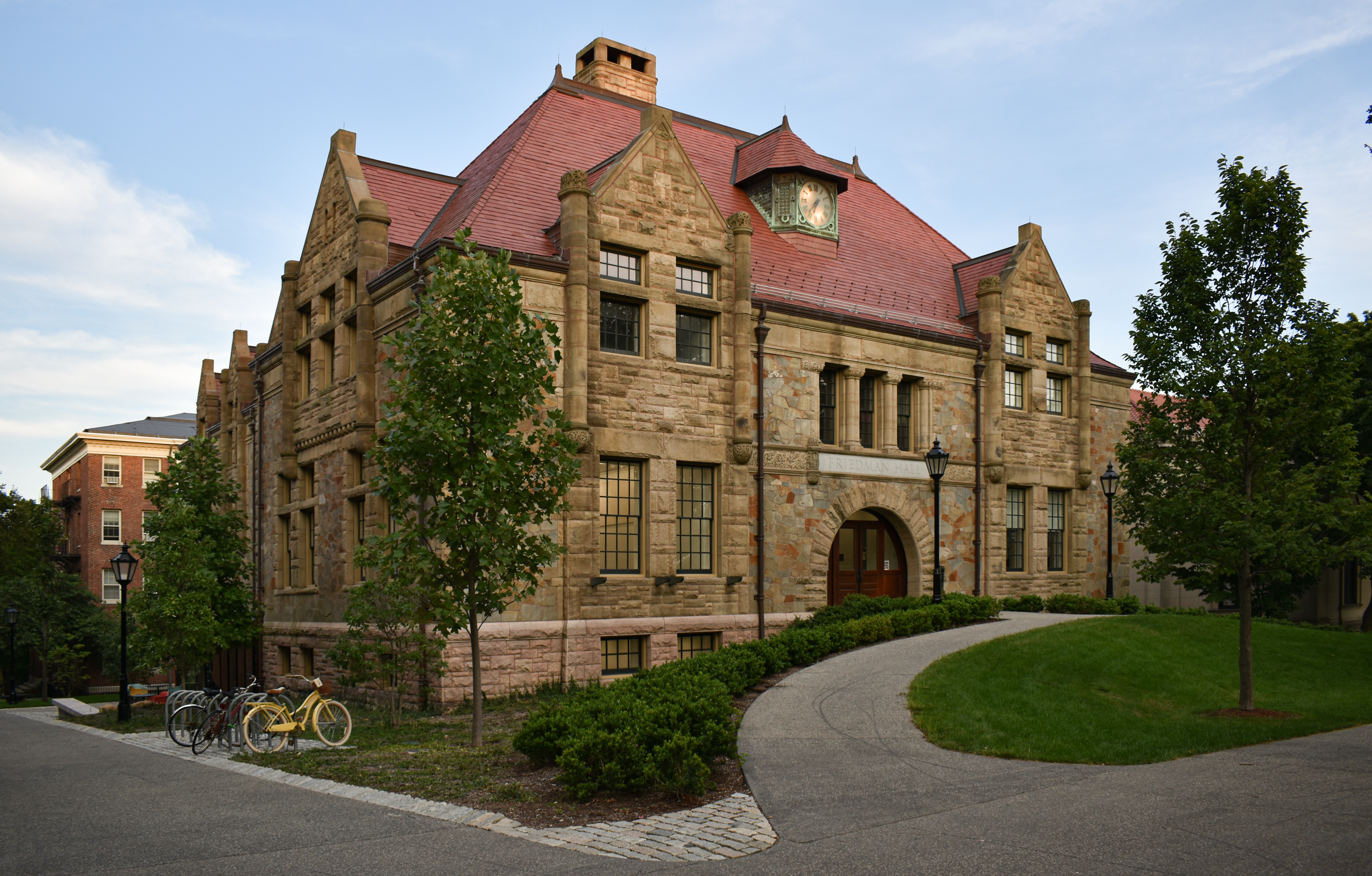
Friedman Hall at Brown University, designed by Gould and his partner Frank W. Angell in 1889 and completed in 1891.

Thomas J. Gould (1849-1923) was an American architect from Providence, Rhode Island.

== Life and career ==
Thomas James Gould was born May 23, 1849, in Providence, Rhode Island to James Coggeshall Gould and Maria Littlefield Gould. He attended the local schools and entered the office of architect William R. Walker in 1868. They were joined in the office by Frank W. Angell in 1872 and Walker's son, W. Howard Walker, in 1874. In January, 1876 he formed a partnership with Walker, known as Walker & Gould. A major work of this partnership was Robinson Hall at Brown University, built in 1876-88 as the university library. In 1880 Gould and Angell made plans to form their own firm, and Walker & Gould dissolved December 31. Gould and Angell continued under the name of Gould & Angell, and the Walkers formed William R. Walker & Son.

In 1893 a third architect, Frank H. Swift, was added to the partnership, which became known as Gould, Angell & Swift. A second office was opened in Boston under the management of Gould. When the firm was dissolved in 1897, Gould briefly carried on in Boston. He returned to Providence circa 1902, forming a new partnership with architect W. H. Colwell (1849-1906), known as Colwell & Gould. After Colwell's death in 1906, a new partnership, Gould & Hall, was formed with Benjamin M. Hall (1880-1960). This was dissolved in 1912 when Hall moved to form a general contracting company. This was followed by Gould's last partnership, Gould & Gould, with W. M. Gould. Gould retired from practice in 1919.

== Personal life ==
Gould was elected a Fellow of the American Institute of Architects in 1883, though he resigned his membership in 1901.

Gould died September 3, 1923, in Newport, Rhode Island.

== Legacy ==
Three buildings designed by Gould with his earlier partners have been listed on the United States National Register of Historic Places, and others contribute to listed historic districts.

== Architectural works (Note: For earlier works of Walker & Gould and Gould & Angell, see William R. Walker and Frank W. Angell.) ==
- House for Herman G. Possner, 1332 Narragansett Blvd, Cranston, Rhode Island (1901, demolished 1990)
- House for William Dempster, (Note: A contributing property to the Wayland Historic District, NRHP-listed in 2005.) 182 Butler Ave, Providence, Rhode Island (1902)
- Imperial Theatre, 569 1/2 Westminster St, Providence, Rhode Island (1902, demolished 1965)
- Central School, Centerville Rd and Commonwealth Ave, Warwick, Rhode Island (1903, demolished)
- House for Annie O. Sweet, (Note: A contributing property to the Olney Street–Alumni Avenue Historic District, NRHP-listed in 1989.) 261 Olney St, Providence, Rhode Island (1903)
- House for Henry E. Smith Jr., 749 School St, Webster, Massachusetts (1905, demolished 2005)
- Thurbers Avenue Primary School addition, 179 Thurbers Ave, Providence, Rhode Island (1909, demolished)
- House for William D. Goff, (Note: A contributing property to the College Hill Historic District, NRHP-listed in 1970.) 180 Brown St, Providence, Rhode Island (1911)
- House for Horatio R. Nightingale, 131 Congdon St, Providence, Rhode Island (1913)
