= William R. Walker & Son =

Defunct American architectural firm

Practice information
- Partners: William R. Walker; W. Howard Walker; William R. Walker II
- Location: Providence, Rhode Island

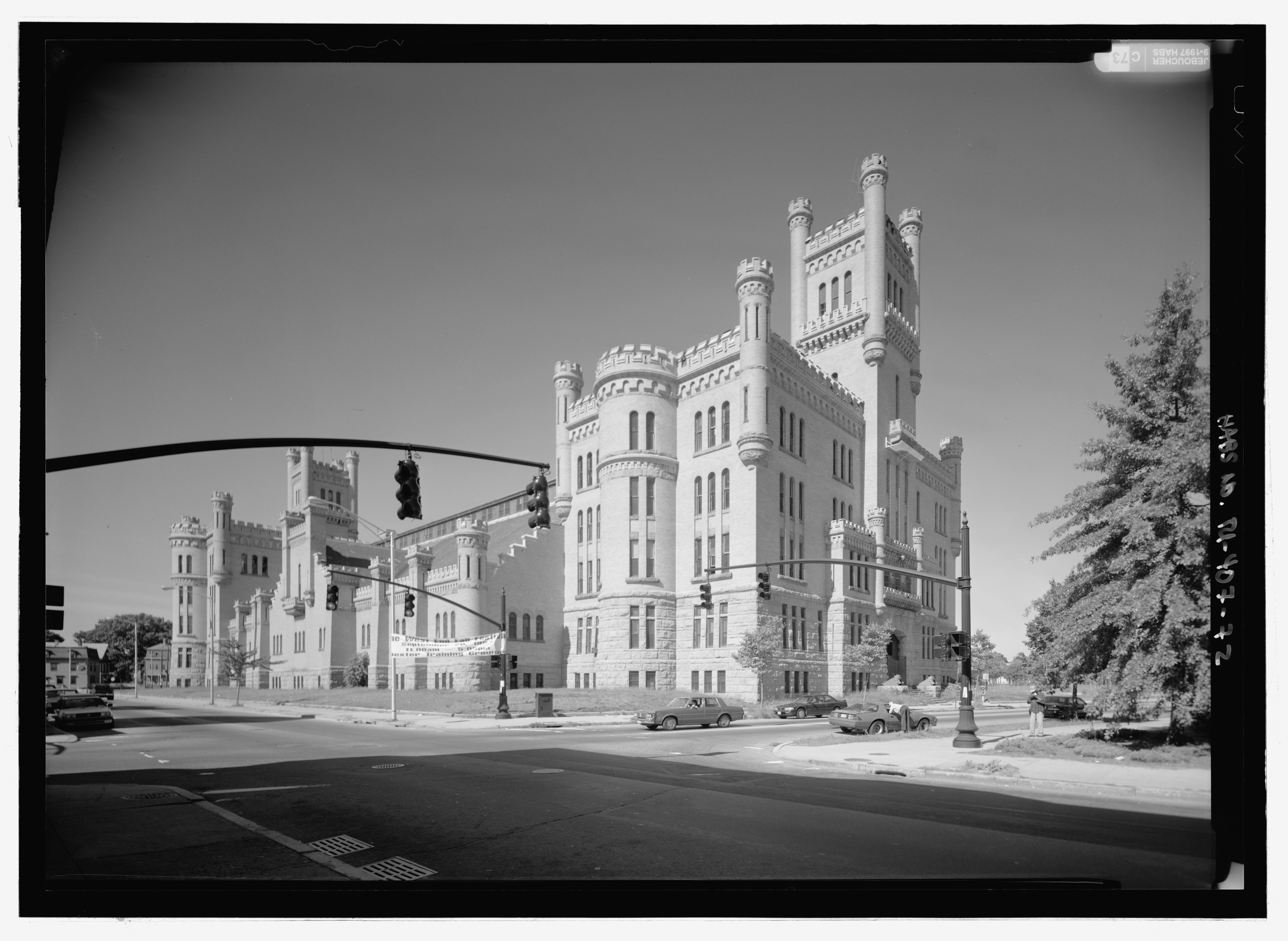
The Cranston Street Armory in Providence is the firm's most visible work. It was designed in a fortified Gothic Revival style and completed in 1907, twelve years after the project was awarded to the firm.

William R. Walker & Son was an American architectural firm based in Providence, Rhode Island. From 1881 to 1936 it was led by three successive generations of the Walker family: founder William R. Walker, his son W. Howard Walker and his grandson William R. Walker II.

== Firm history ==
William R. Walker (1830 – 1905) began his architectural practice in Providence in 1864. From 1876 to 1880 he worked in partnership with Thomas J. Gould, an employee since 1868, under the name Walker & Gould. In January 1881 Walker took his son W. Howard Walker (1856 – 1922) into partnership to form the firm of William R. Walker & Son, Gould having withdrawn.The elder Walker retired in 1903 and died in 1905. W. Howard Walker was sole proprietor of the firm until 1911, when he was joined by his son, William R. Walker II (1884 – 1936). W. Howard Walker died in 1922, at which point his son took charge until his own death in 1936. After the death of the last Walker, the firm was briefly succeeded by Rice & Arnold, the partnership of George H. Rice (1881 – 1945) and Roy F. Arnold (1884 – 1972), both draftsmen in the Walker office. Both retired during the early years of World War II and the firm was finally dissolved.

For forty years, the offices of the firm were in the Vaughan Building on Custom House Street, completed by Walker & Gould in 1879. They remained in the building even after it was gutted by fire in 1884, destroying their property. During the year-long reconstruction of the building they were located in the Daniels Building across the street. In 1921 they relocated to Hall's Building on Weybosset Street, where they remained until Arnold dissolved the firm. Throughout the firm's history, it was known for the design of public buildings including state armories, town and city halls and public schools. All of the Walkers had important political connections which enabled them to obtain these commissions. Though never the most important part of their practice, the Walkers also designed churches, private homes, commercial buildings and movie theatres, the latter of which may have grown from their experience with wide-span structures in armories.

== Walker family biographies ==
William Howard Walker
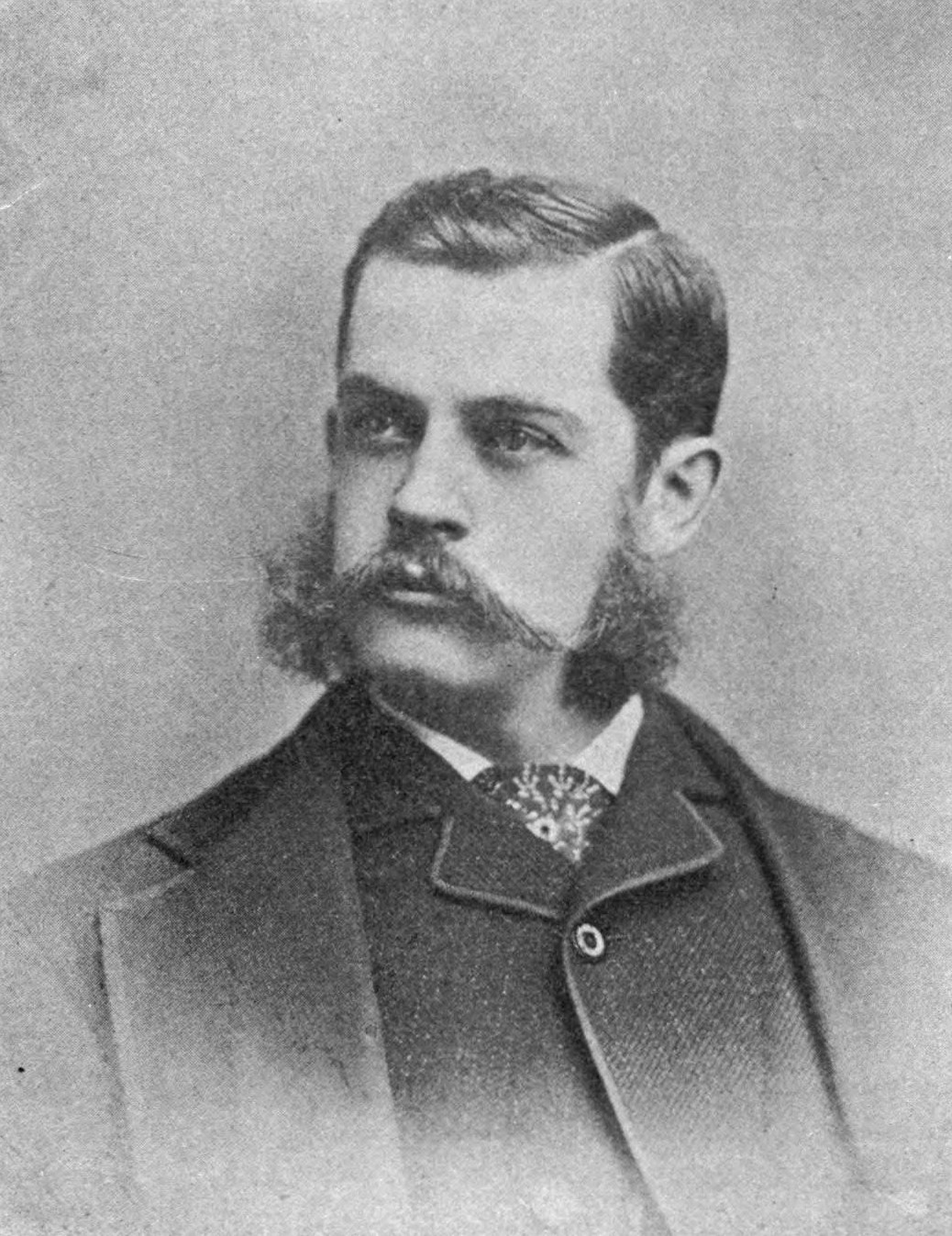
- W. Howard Walker, c. 1891
- Born: January 19, 1856; Pawtucket, Rhode Island, US
- Died: October 19, 1922 (aged 66); Providence, Rhode Island, US
- Occupation: Architect

William Russell Walker II
- Born: January 28, 1884; Pawtucket, Rhode Island, US
- Died: September 26, 1936 (aged 52); Providence, Rhode Island, US
- Occupation: Architect

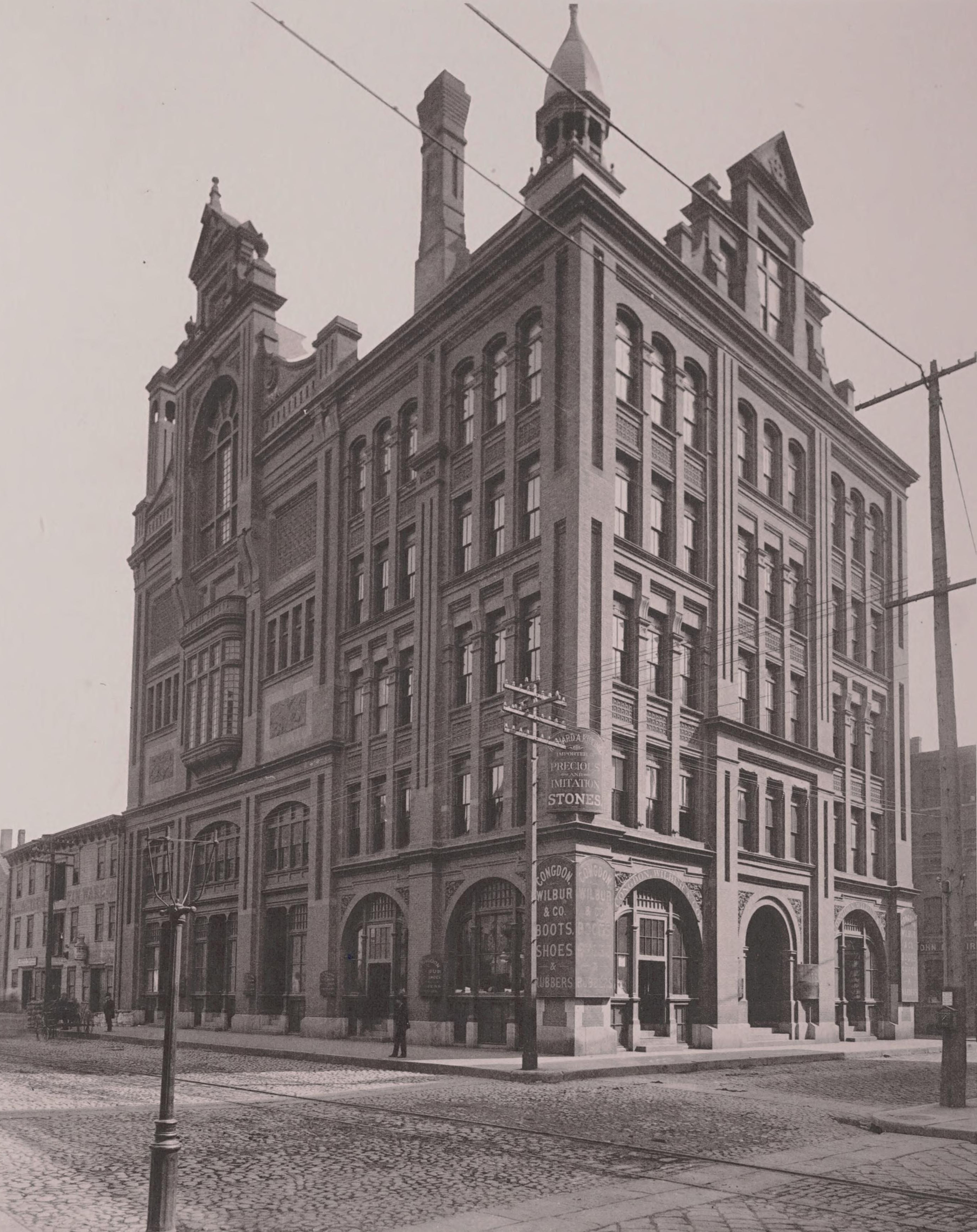
The former Masonic Temple in Providence, designed by the firm in the Queen Anne style and completed in 1886.

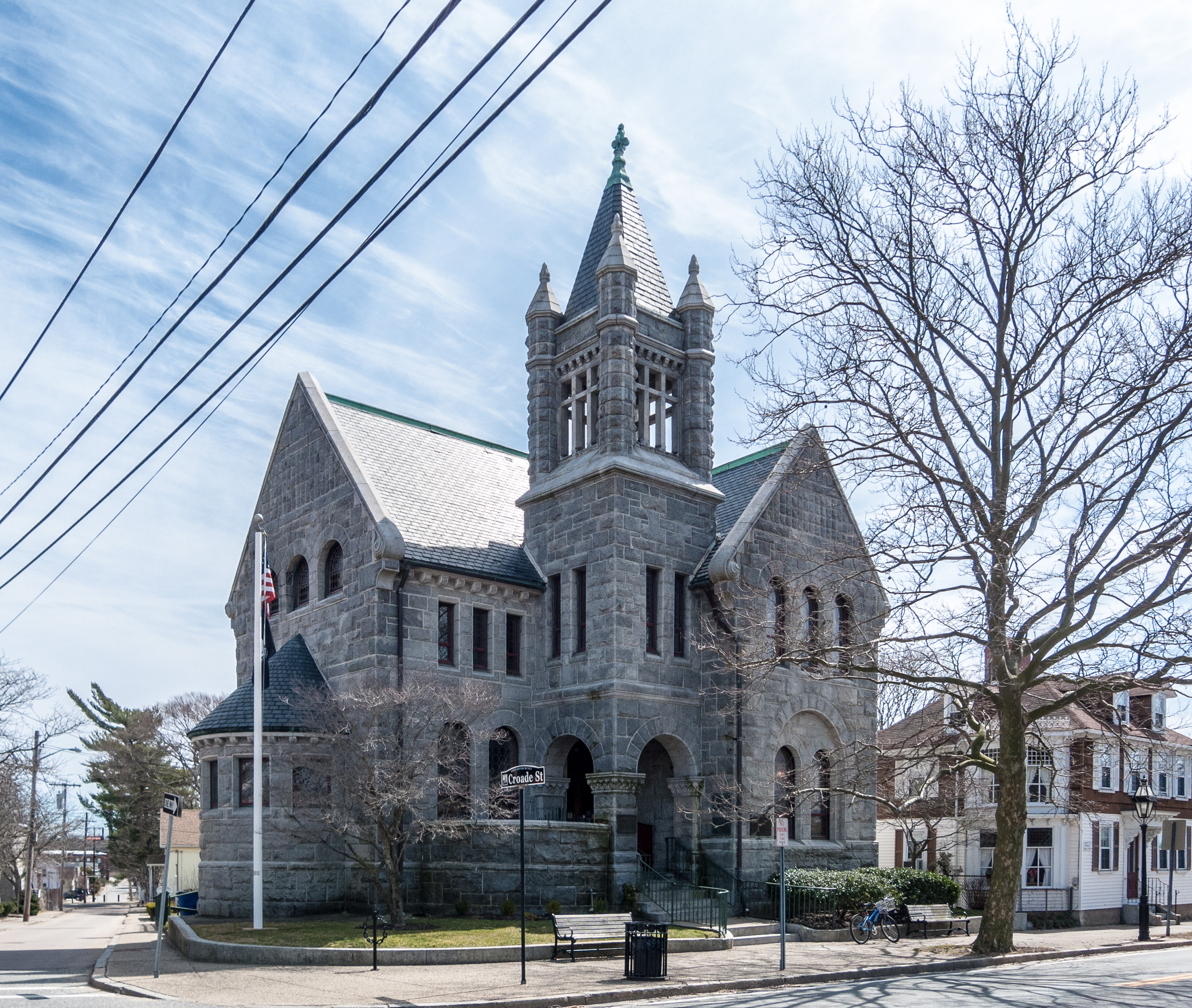
The George Hail Free Library in Warren, designed by the firm in the Richardsonian Romanesque style and completed in 1889.

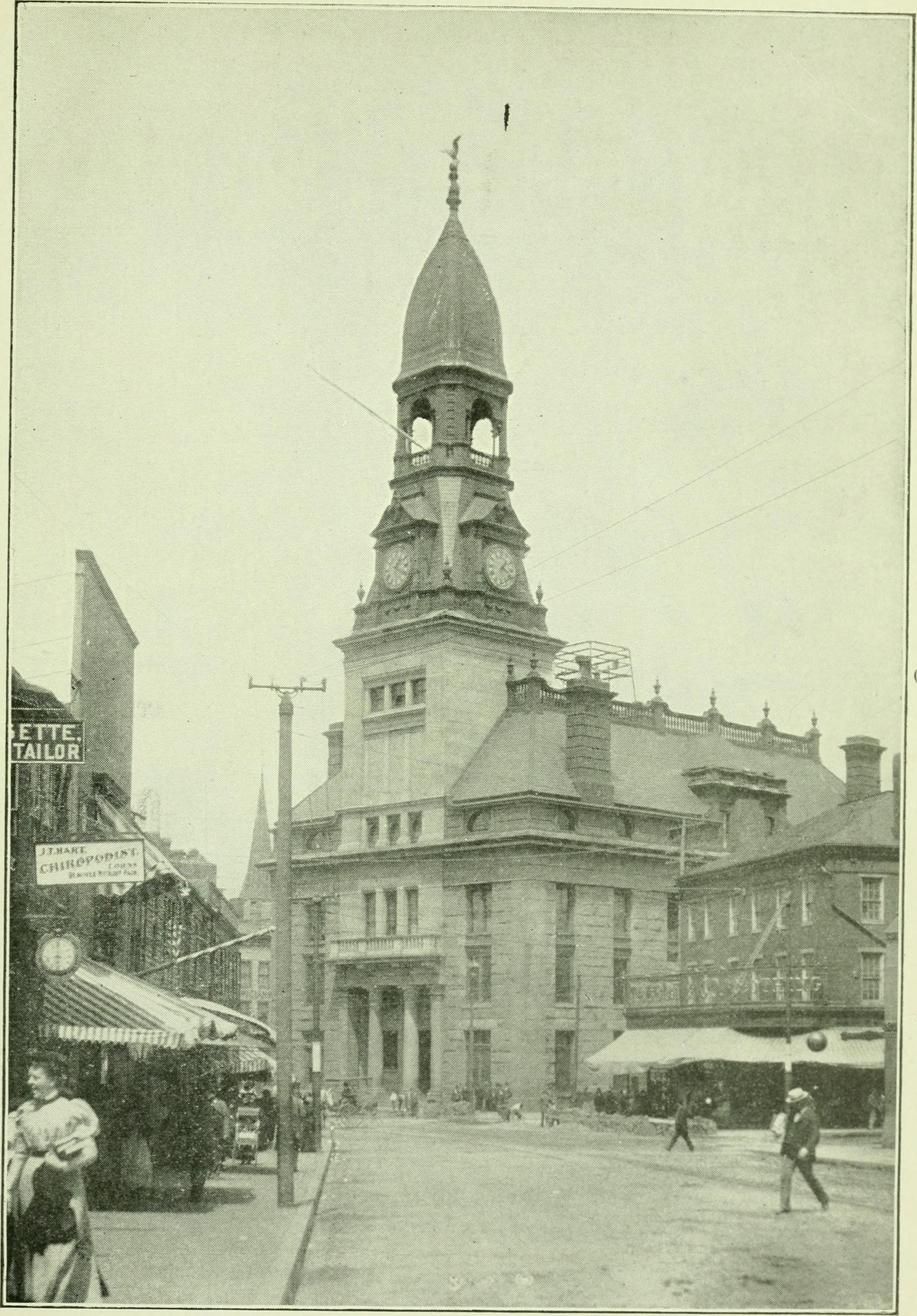
The former Fall River City Hall, designed by the firm in the Colonial Revival style and completed in 1890. Demolished in 1962.

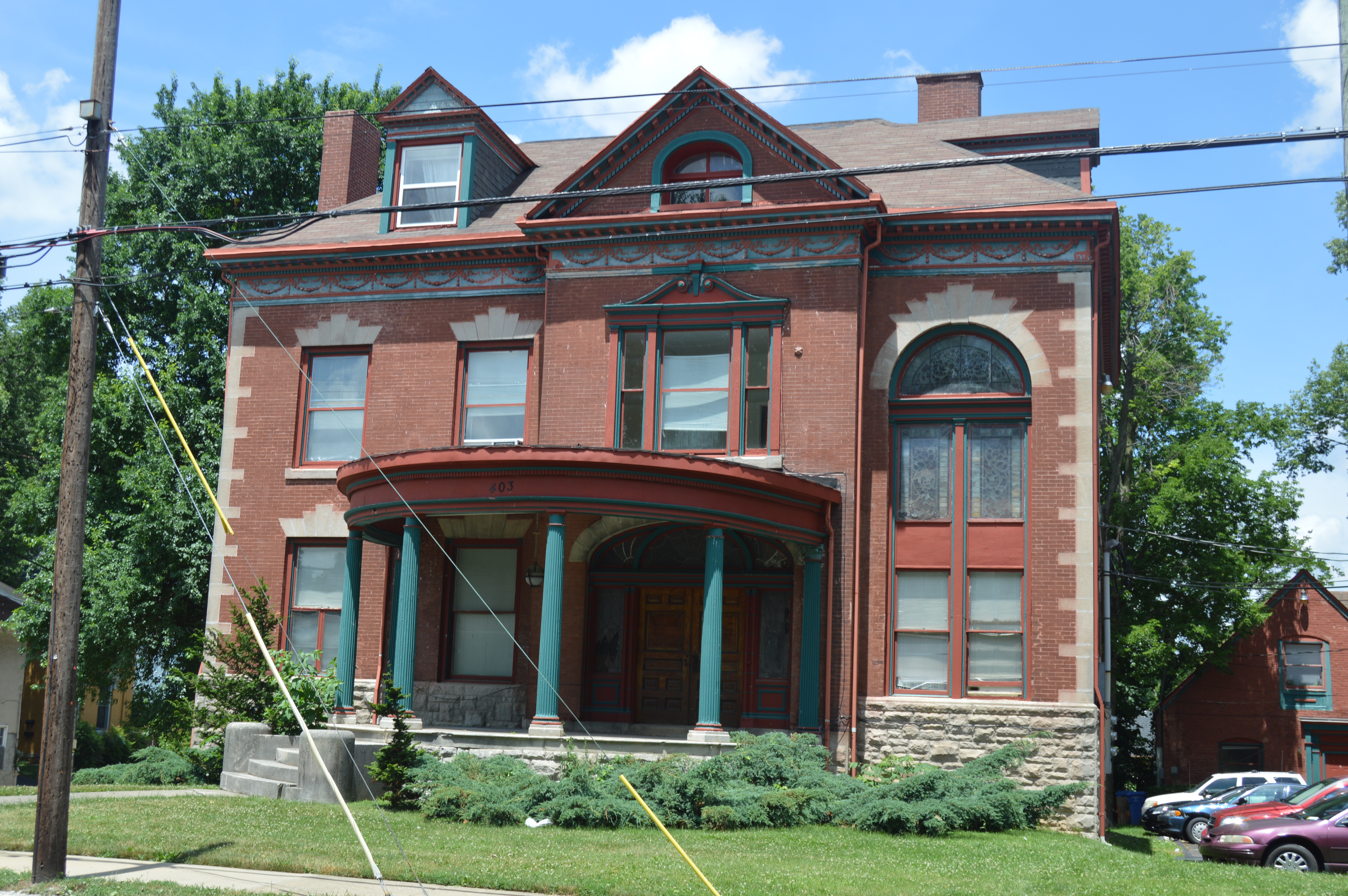
The Henry P. Kinkead House in Lexington, Kentucky, designed by the firm in the Colonial Revival style and completed in 1893.

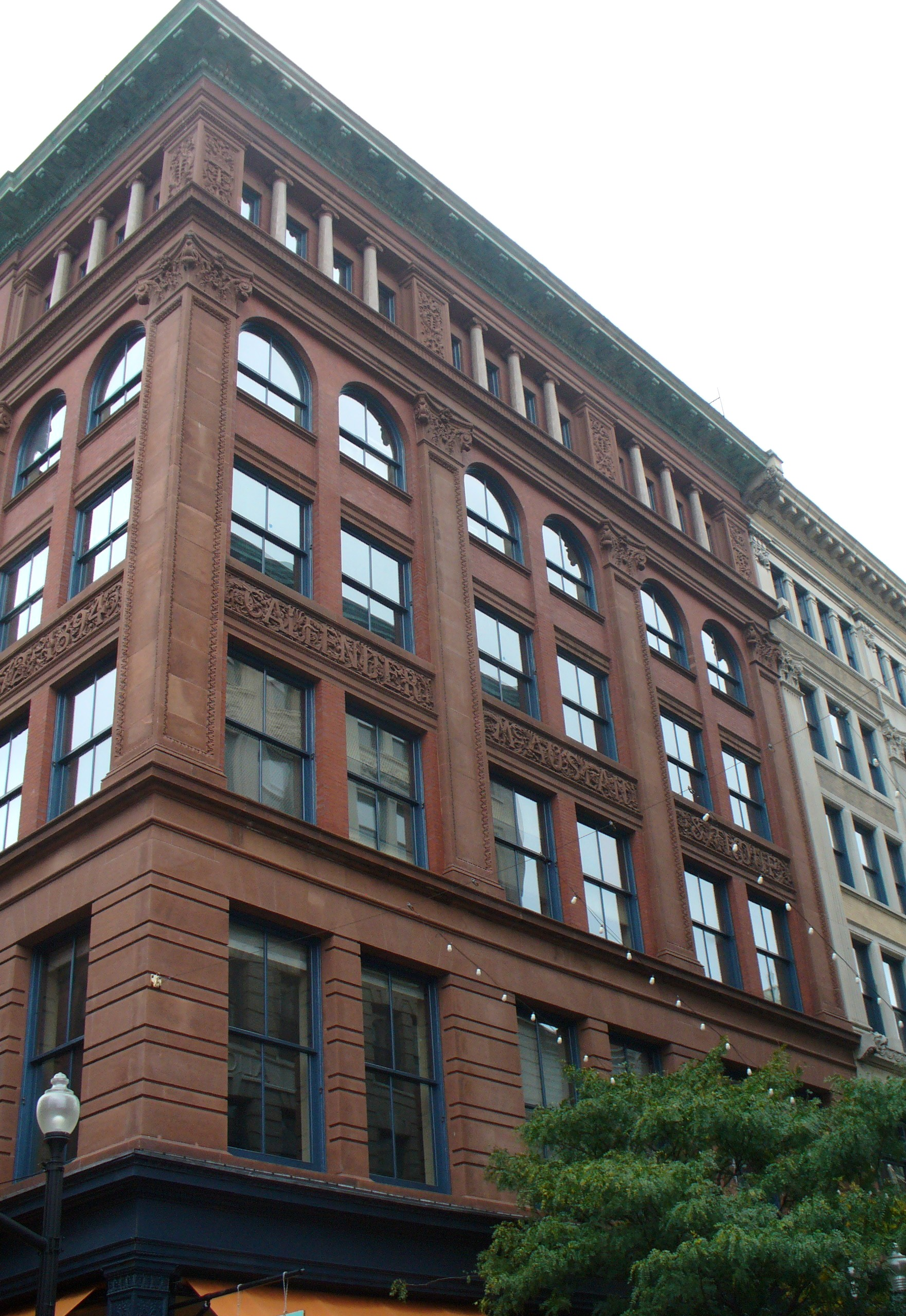
The Boston Store in Providence, designed by the firm in the Italian Renaissance Revival style and completed in 1894.

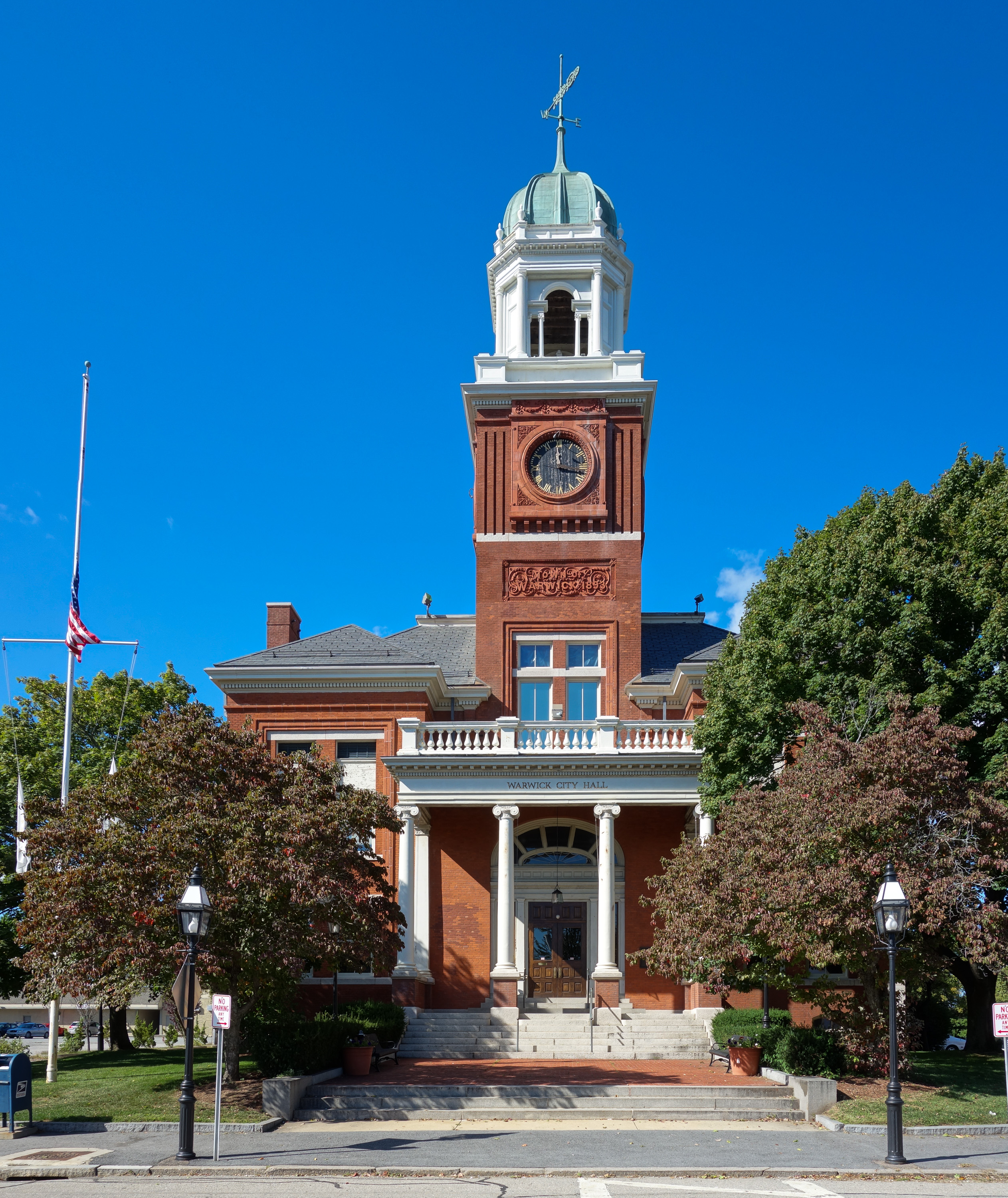
The Warwick City Hall, designed by the firm in the Colonial Revival style and completed in 1894.

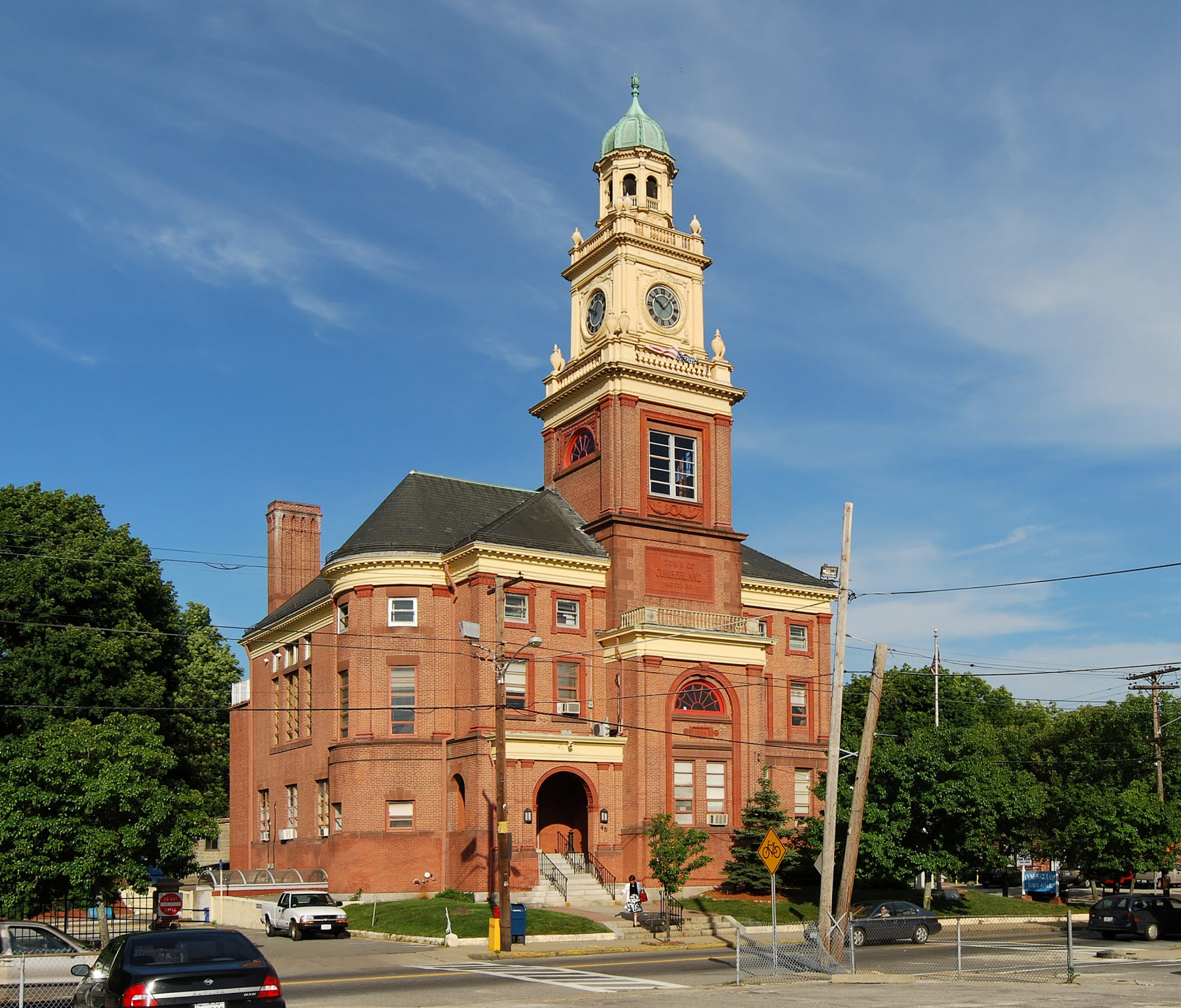
The Cumberland Town Hall in Valley Falls, designed by the firm in the Colonial Revival style and completed in 1895.

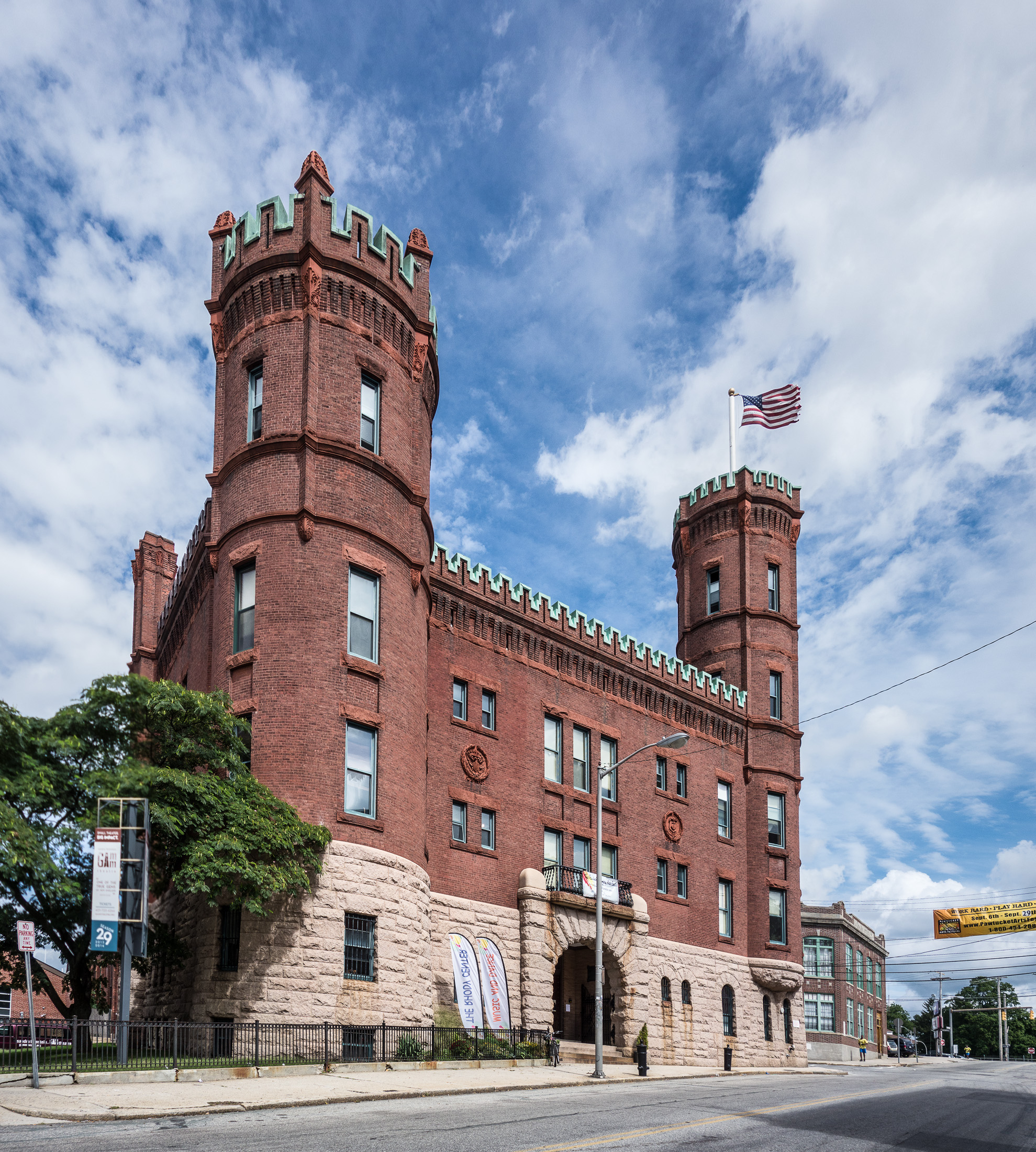
The Pawtucket Armory, designed by the firm in a fortified Gothic Revival style and completed in 1895.

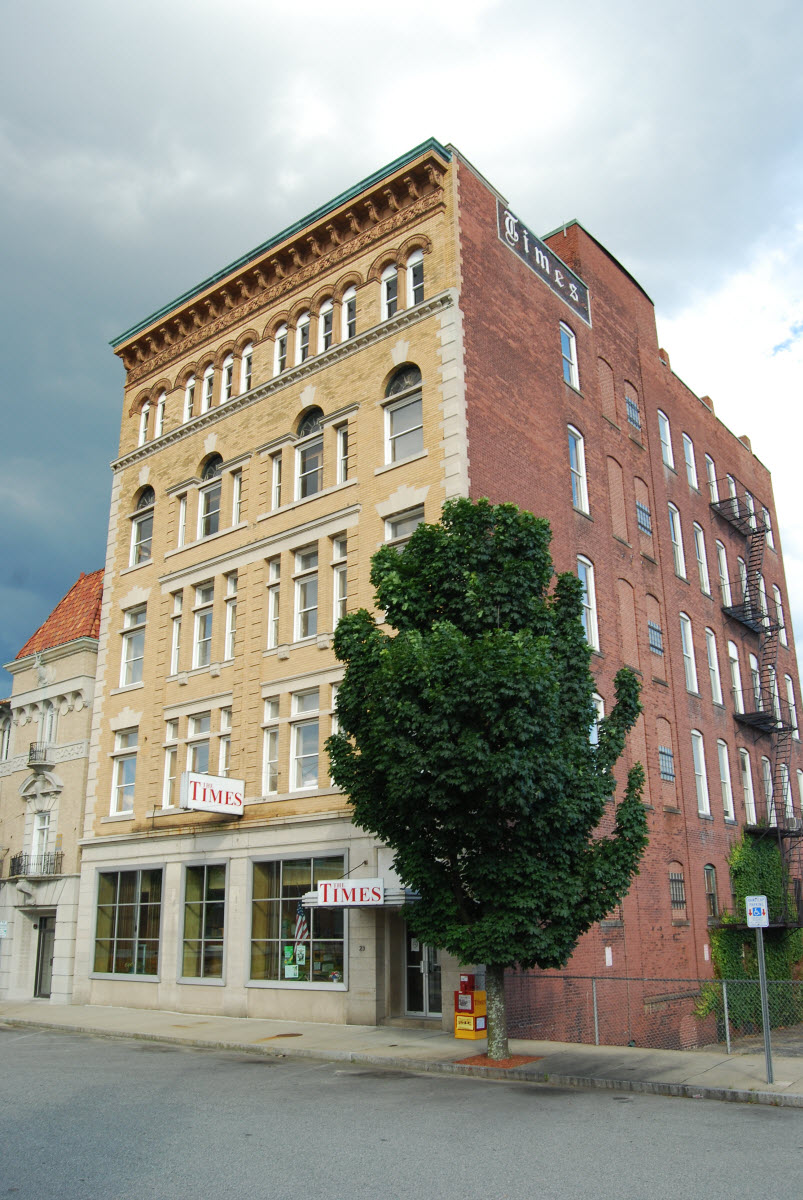
The Pawtucket Times Building, designed by the firm in the Italian Renaissance Revival style and completed in 1896.

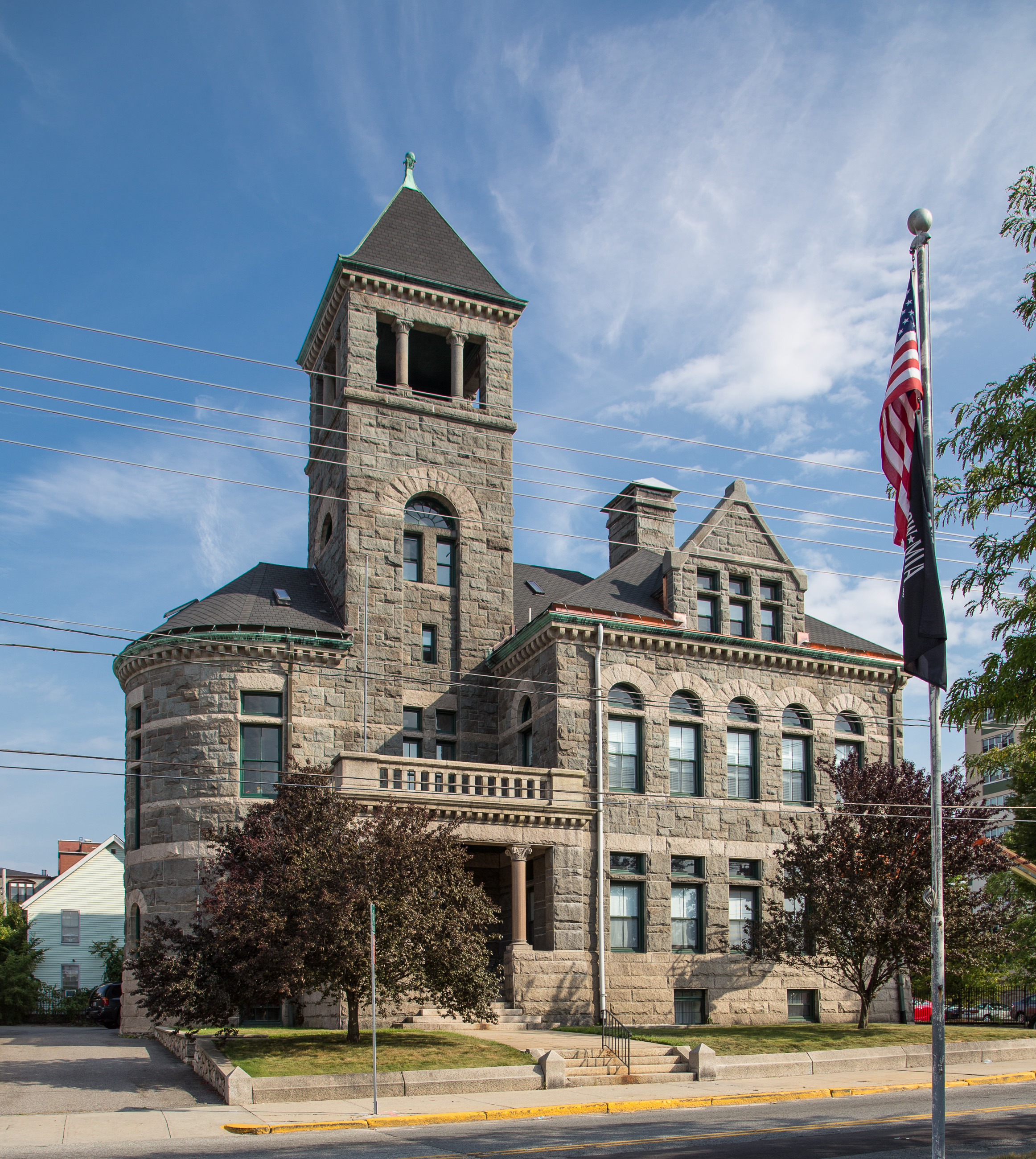
The Woonsocket District Courthouse, designed by the firm in a hybrid Richardsonian Romanesque and Neoclassical style and completed in 1896.

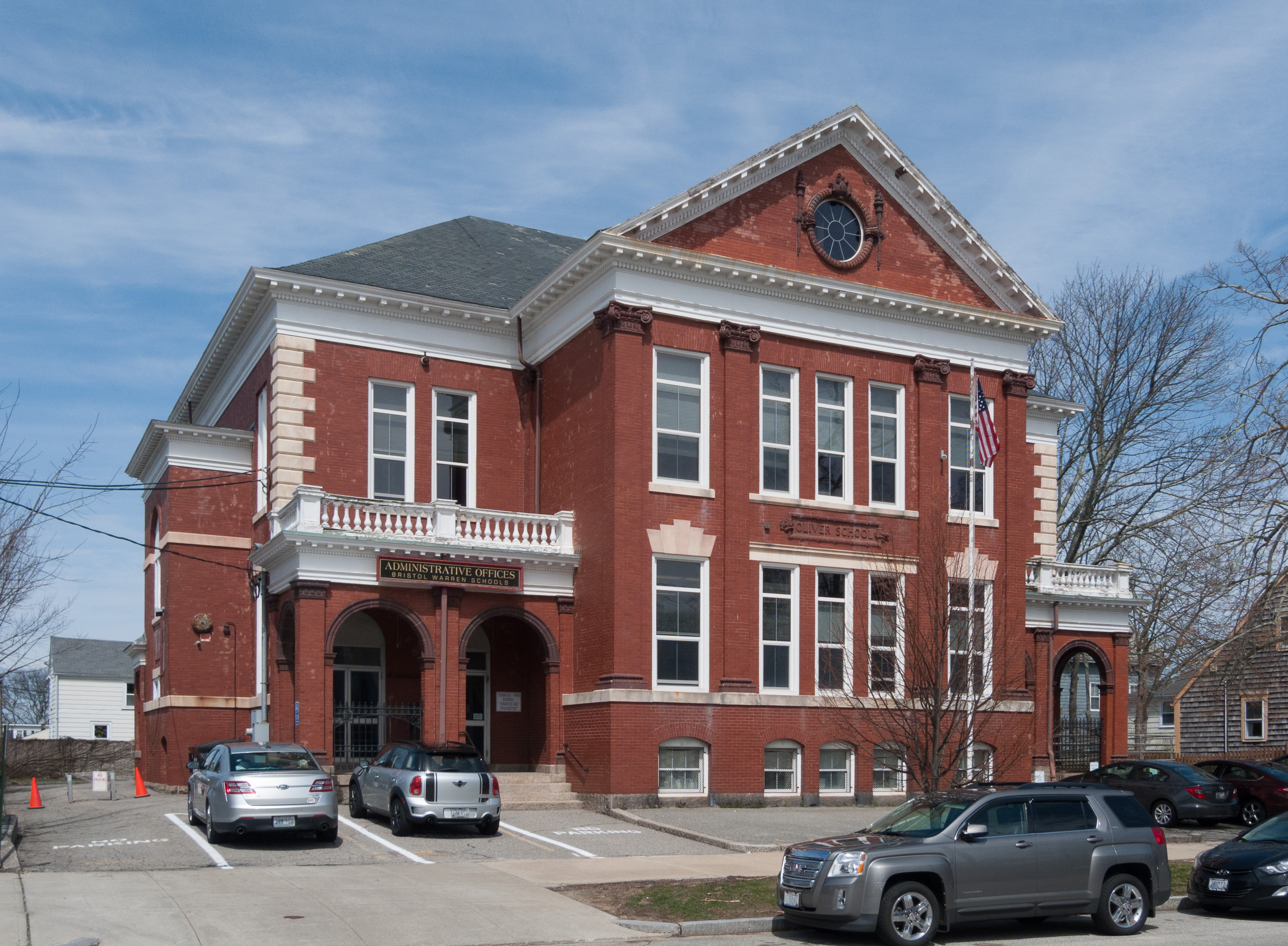
The Oliver School in Bristol, designed by the firm in the Colonial Revival style and completed in 1901.

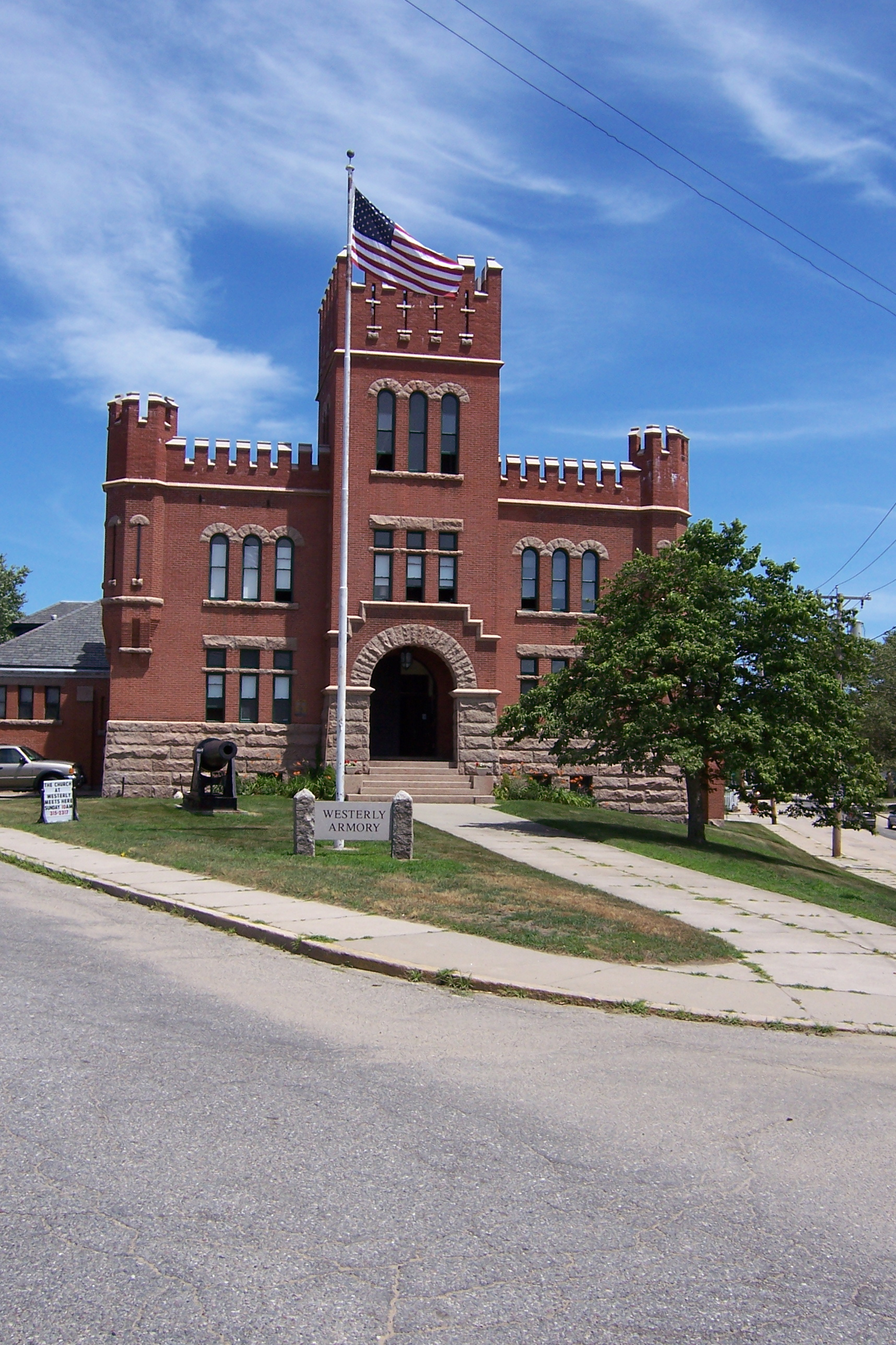
The Westerly Armory, designed by the firm in a fortified Gothic Revival style and completed in 1902.

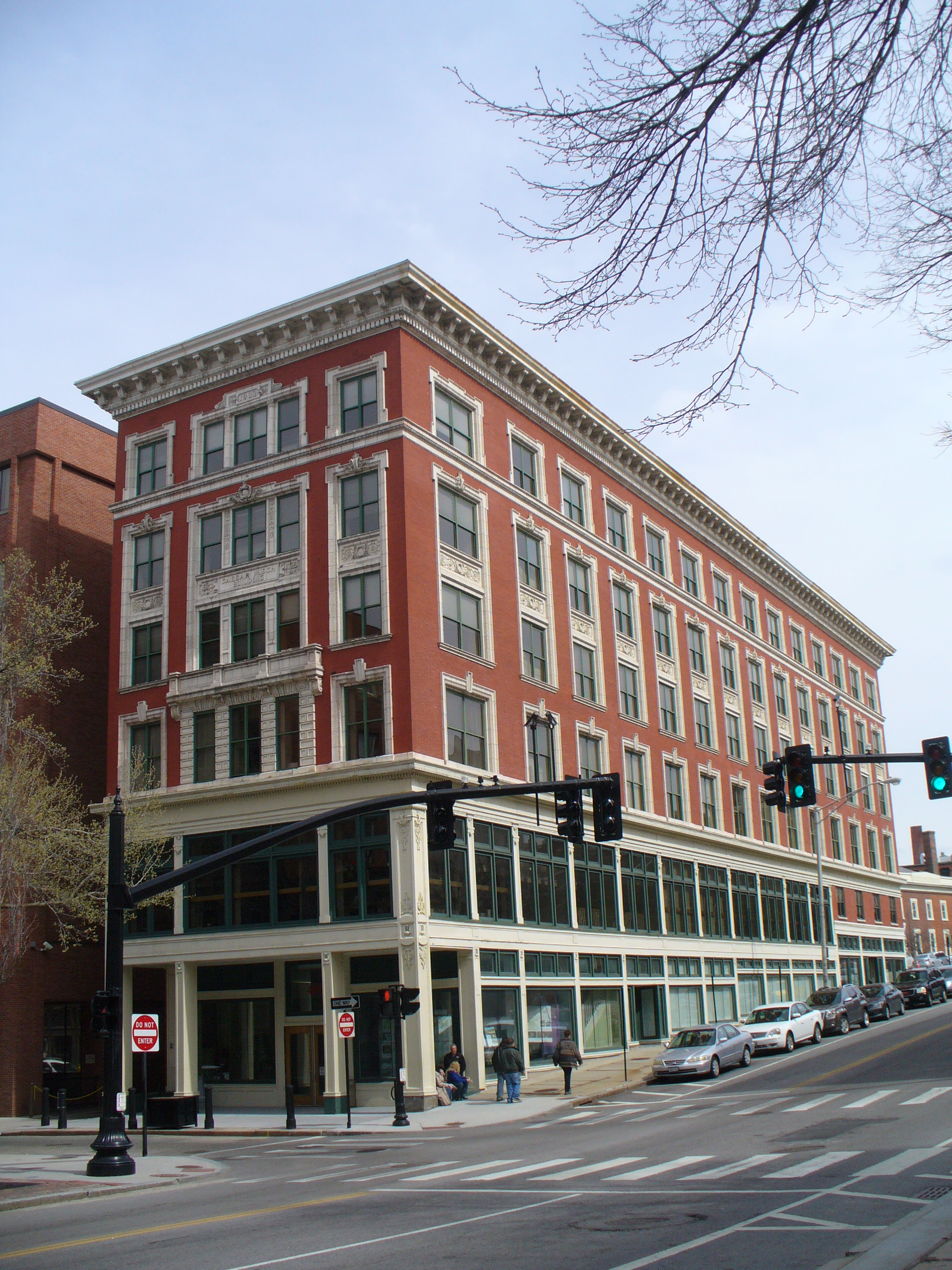
The Caesar Misch Building in Providence, designed by the firm in the Neoclassical style and completed in 1904.

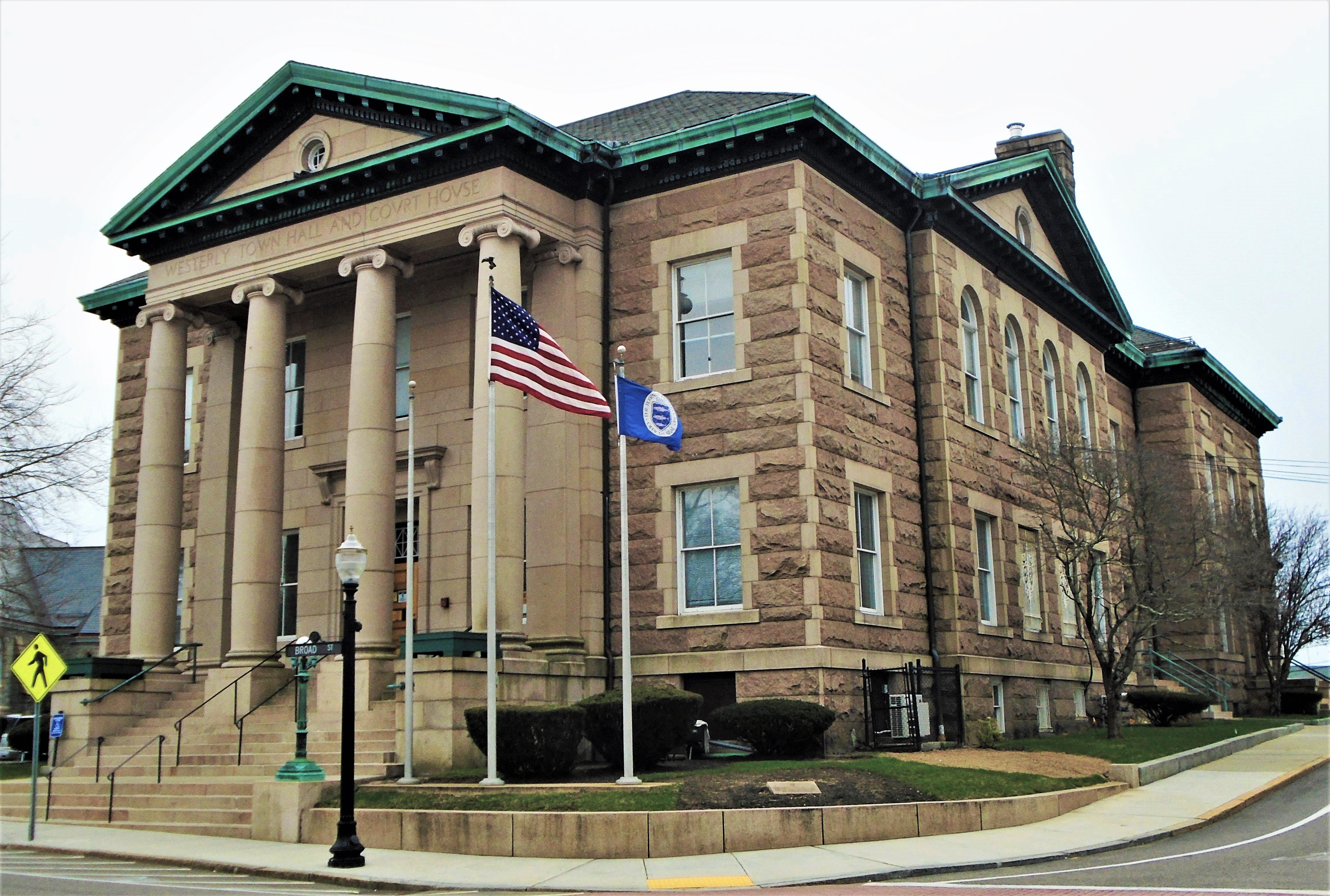
The Westerly Town Hall, designed by the firm in the Neoclassical style and completed in 1912.

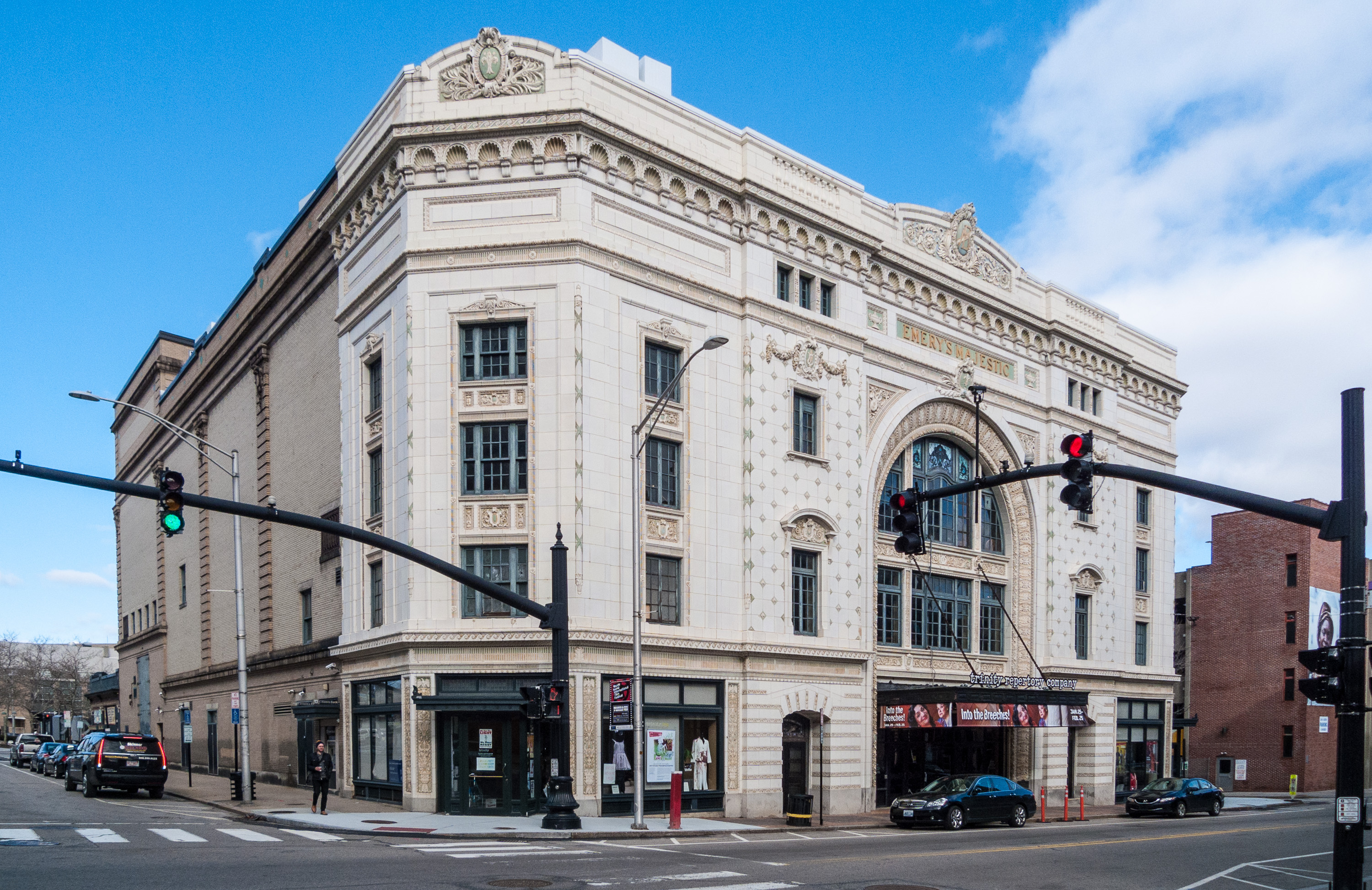
The Majestic Theatre in Providence, now home to the Trinity Repertory Company, designed by the firm in the Neoclassical style and completed in 1917.

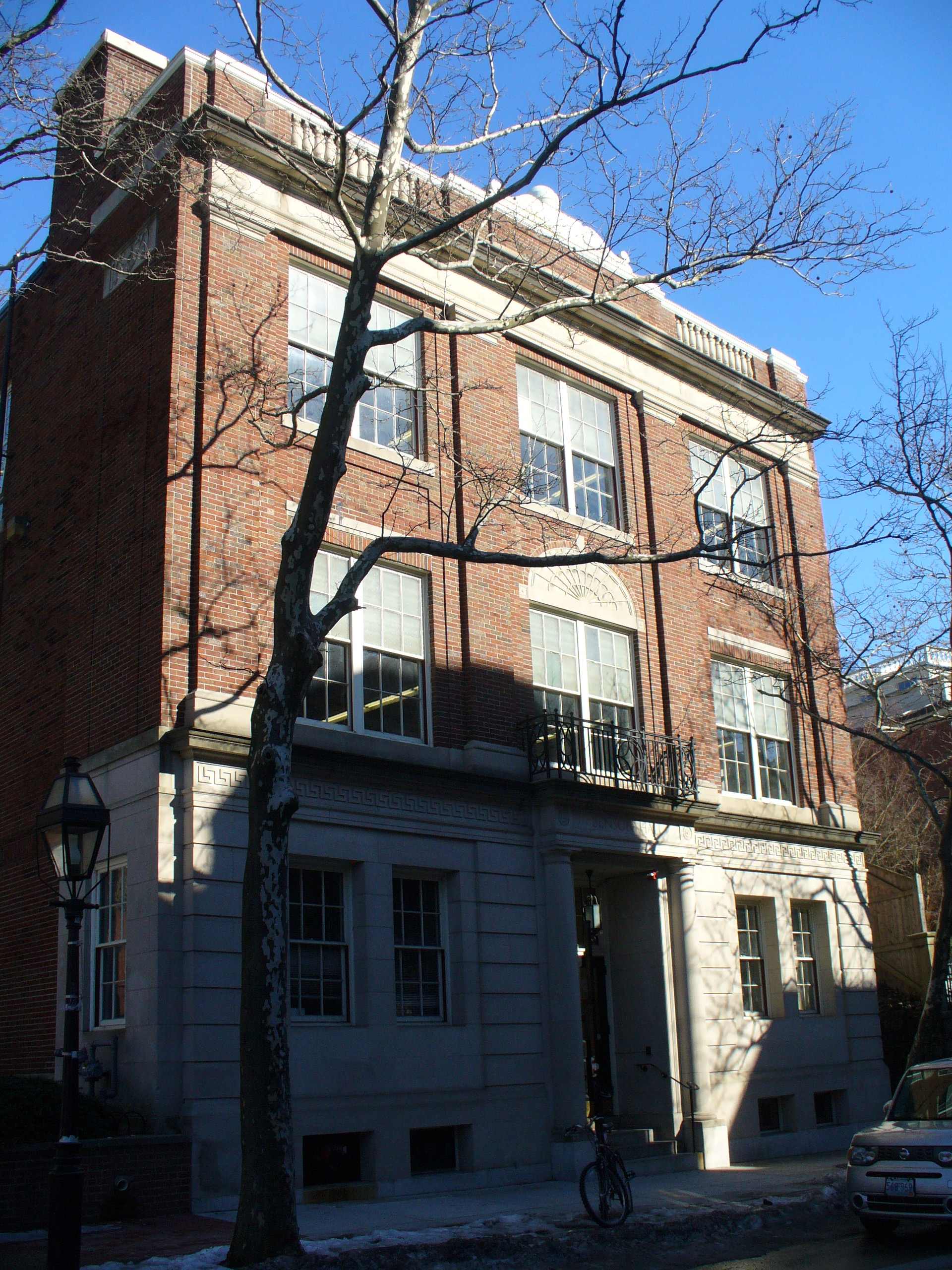
The former Rhode Island College of Pharmacy in Providence, designed by the firm in the Colonial Revival style and completed in 1924.

=== W. Howard Walker ===
William Howard Walker (January 19, 1856 – October 19, 1922) was born in Pawtucket, Rhode Island. He was educated in the Pawtucket public schools and at Mowry & Goff's preparatory English and Classical School in Providence before joining his father's office as a student draftsman at the age of 19. After the withdrawal of Thomas J. Gould, his father's partner, he took his place. Between his father's retirement in 1903 and his son's return from Europe in 1911, Walker was sole proprietor of the firm.

Walker was married in 1881 to Hattie Boone Newell of Providence. They had three children, including two sons and one daughter. Like his father, Walker was prominent in the Rhode Island militia and in Freemasonry, retiring from the former in 1912 with the rank of Quartermaster General. While a sole proprietor Walker completed the Cranston Street Armory (1907) and designed the Attleboro (1910) and Woonsocket (1912) armories. He was also a member of the American Institute of Architects (AIA), the Rhode Island Philatelic Society, Sons of the American Revolution and the To Kalon Club and served two terms in the Rhode Island House of Representatives. He died at home in Providence at the age of 66 after an illness of ten months.

=== William R. Walker II ===
William Russell Walker II (January 28, 1884 – September 26, 1936) was born in Pawtucket, Rhode Island. He was educated in the Pawtucket public schools and at Brown University before transferring to the Massachusetts Institute of Technology, from which he graduated in 1910. He then spent a year abroad, studying in a Beaux-Arts atelier in Paris. He returned to Providence in 1911 and joined his father's firm. He became its head after his father's death in 1922. Like his father and grandfather, he continued the firm's focus on institutional work. In 1932 he was chosen by United States Commissioner of Education William John Cooper to be an advisory architect for school construction.

Walker was married in 1914 to Jessie Philpott of Providence. They had three children, all daughters. Unlike his father and grandfather, Walker was not affiliated with the state militia, but was prominent in masonic circles. He was also a member of the AIA, the Rhode Island Country Club and the Turks Head Club. He died at home in Providence of a heart attack at the age 52.

== Legacy ==
The Walker office was the first employer of Albert H. Humes, later a noted Pawtucket architect and Central Falls mayor, and of Franklin R. Hindle, partner in the ecclesiastical architectural firm of Murphy, Hindle & Wright. They also employed Thomas J. Gould, former partner of William R. Walker, at the end of his career, from 1919 to 1923.

At least sixteen works completed by the firm have been listed on the United States National Register of Historic Places, and over fifty more contribute to listed historic districts.

== Architectural works ==
=== In Providence, Rhode Island ===
- 1881 – John E. Troup house, 477 Broadway, Providence
  - A contributing resource to the NRHP-listed Broadway–Armory Historic District.
- 1882 – George E. Boyden house, 20 Bainbridge Ave, Providence
  - A contributing resource to the NRHP-listed Broadway–Armory Historic District.
- 1883 – Elmwood Grammar School (former), 15 Vineyard St, Providence
- 1883 – St. Theresa of Avila Catholic Church (former), 265 Manton Ave, Providence
- 1884 – Frank M. Mathewson house, 224 Bowen St, Providence
  - A contributing resource to the NRHP-listed College Hill Historic District.
- 1885 – John McAuslan house, 544 Elmwood Ave, Providence
  - One of Providence's most eleborate houses of the era. Demolished.
- 1885 – Smith Street Primary School, 400 Smith St, Providence
  - NRHP-listed.
- 1886 – Atwells Avenue Fire Station, 318 Atwells Ave, Providence
  - Demolished.
- 1886 – Covell Street School, 231 Amherst St, Providence
  - NRHP-listed.
- 1886 – Masonic Temple, 127 Dorrance St, Providence
  - Burned in 1896 and replaced by a building designed by Fred E. Field.
- 1888 – Christ Episcopal Church, 909 Eddy St, Providence
  - Formerly NRHP-listed. Demolished in 2006.
- 1888 – Manton Avenue Grammar School, 917 Manton Ave, Providence
  - Demolished in 2002.
- 1889 – Boston Store annex, 140 Union St, Providence
  - A contributing resource to the NRHP-listed Downtown Providence Historic District.
- 1891 – Johnston High School (former), Killingly and Jewell Sts, Providence
  - After the Olneyville and Silver Lake neighborhoods of Johnston were annexed to Providence, this building was used by the city as a primary school. Demolished.
- 1893 – James E. Sullivan house, 254 Wayland Ave, Providence
  - A contributing resource to the NRHP-listed Wayland Historic District.
- 1894 – Boston Store, 239 Westminster St, Providence
  - Incorporating the original Boston Store, designed by Walker and completed in 1873, and the annex, completed in 1889. A contributing resource to the NRHP-listed Downtown Providence Historic District.
- 1895 – St. Joseph's Hospital, 21 Peace St, Providence
  - Demolished.
- 1897 – Lederer Building, 137 Mathewson St, Providence
  - A contributing resource to the NRHP-listed Downtown Providence Historic District.
- 1898 – Hotel Savoy, 135 Snow St, Providence
  - Demolished in 1994. Formerly a contributing resource to the NRHP-listed Downtown Providence Historic District.
- 1900 – Estelle R. Jackson duplex, 121-123 Benevolent St, Providence
  - A contributing resource to the NRHP-listed Hope–Power–Cooke Streets Historic District.
- 1900 – George W. Robertson House, 242 Adelaide Ave, Providence
  - A contributing resource to the NRHP-listed Elmwood Historic District.
- 1904 – Caesar Misch Building, 400 Westminster St, Providence
  - A contributing resource to the NRHP-listed Downtown Providence Historic District.
- 1907 – Cranston Street Armory, 125 Dexter St, Providence
  - A contributing resource to the NRHP-listed Broadway–Armory Historic District.
- 1911 – Hanley Building, 56 Pine St, Providence
  - A contributing resource to the NRHP-listed Downtown Providence Historic District.
- 1914 – Armory of Mounted Commands, 1051 N Main St, Providence
  - The headhouse was built in 1923–1925 from plans by William G. Richards.
- 1914 – Carlton Theatre, 79 Mathewson St, Providence
  - Demolished in 1954.
- 1915 – Avon Cinema, 260 Thayer St, Providence
  - A contributing resource to the NRHP-listed College Hill Historic District.
- 1915 – Everett Apartments, 111 Everett Ave, Providence
  - A contributing resource to the NRHP-listed Wayland Historic District.
- 1916 – Esek Hopkins School, 480 Charles St, Providence
- 1916 – Modern Theatre, 440 Westminster St, Providence
  - Demolished in 1966.
- 1917 – Hotel Dreyfus, 95 Mathewson St, Providence
  - A contributing resource to the NRHP-listed Downtown Providence Historic District.
- 1917 – Majestic Theatre, 201 Washington St, Providence
  - Now the Lederer Theatre of the Trinity Repertory Company. NRHP-listed, also a contributing resource to the NRHP-listed Downtown Providence Historic District.
- 1917 – Medical Building, 234 Thayer St, Providence
  - A contributing resource to the NRHP-listed College Hill Historic District.
- 1920 – Watkins Building, 274 Pine St, Providence
  - Now the Student Services Center of Johnson & Wales University.
- 1922 – Washington Building, 93 Washington St, Providence
  - Demolished.
- 1924 – Jewish Orphanage of Rhode Island (former), 164 Summit Ave, Providence, Rhode Island
  - Remodeled in the 1950s to become Miriam Hospital.
- 1924 – Rhode Island College of Pharmacy and Allied Sciences (former), 235 Benefit St, Providence
  - Now Benson Hall of the Rhode Island School of Design. A contributing resource to the NRHP-listed College Hill Historic District.
- 1926 – Henry Barnard School, Rhode Island College (former campus), Providence
  - Demolished. Now the site of Providence Place.
- 1934 – Gymnasium and Training School, Rhode Island School for the Deaf (former campus), Providence

=== Elsewhere in Providence County, Rhode Island ===
- 1882 – John F. Clarke house, 91 Broad St, Valley Falls
- 1882 – Ernest W. Tinkham house, 194 East Ave, Harrisville
  - Built for the son of the owner of the Harrisville mills and village. A contributing resource to the NRHP-listed Harrisville Historic District.
- 1884 – Corliss Safe Manufacturing Company works, 72 Fenner St, Cranston
  - Altered.
- 1884 – First Freewill Baptist Church, 130 Broadway, Pawtucket
  - A contributing resource to the NRHP-listed Quality Hill Historic District.
- 1885 – Park Place Congregational Church, 12 Park Pl, Pawtucket
  - Burned in 1934.
- 1886 – First Ward Wardroom, 171 Fountain St, Pawtucket
  - NRHP-listed.
- 1886 – Fifth Ward Wardroom, 47 Mulberry St, Pawtucket
  - NRHP-listed.
- 1889 – Central Falls High School (former), 580 Broad St, Central Falls
  - Now the Central Falls City Hall. A contributing resource to the NRHP-listed South Central Falls Historic District.
- 1889 – East Providence Town Hall, 145 Taunton Ave, East Providence
  - Burned in 1976.
- 1889 – United Congregational Church, 75 N Broadway, East Providence
- 1890 – Church Hill Grammar School, 81 Park Pl, Pawtucket
  - NRHP-listed.
- 1891 – Grove Street School, Grove and Spring Sts, Pawtucket
  - Demolished.
- 1892 – Charles C. Newall House, 234 Norwood Ave, Cranston
  - A contributing resource to the NRHP-listed Norwood Avenue Historic District.
- 1894 – Payne Building, 7 Goff Ave, Pawtucket
  - Demolished.
- 1894 – St. Joseph's Catholic Church parochial school (former), 196 Walcott St, Pawtucket
  - A contributing resource to the NRHP-listed Quality Hill Historic District.
- 1895 – Cumberland Town Hall, 45 Broad St, Valley Falls
  - A contributing resource to the NRHP-listed Cumberland Town Hall Historic District.
- 1895 – Pawtucket Armory, 172 Exchange St, Pawtucket
  - NRHP-listed, also a contributing resource to the NRHP-listed Exchange Street Historic District.
- 1896 – Pawtucket High School (former), 300 Broadway, Pawtucket
- 1896 – Pawtucket Times Building, 23 Exchange St, Pawtucket
  - NRHP-listed.
- 1896 – Woonsocket District Courthouse, 24 Front St, Woonsocket
  - NRHP-listed.
- 1897 – St. Charles Borromeo Catholic Church parochial school, 62 Daniels St, Woonsocket
  - Demolished.
- 1898 – Masonic Building, 55 High St, Pawtucket
  - Demolished.
- 1904 – South Woodlawn School, 54 Warren Ave, Pawtucket
  - Demolished.
- 1908 – Prospect Street School, 329 Prospect St, Pawtucket
  - Demolished.
- 1912 – Woonsocket Armory, 350 S Main St, Woonsocket
- 1914 – Central Falls Police Station and Courthouse (former), 507 Broad St, Central Falls
- 1919 – Metacomet Country Club, 500 Veterans Memorial Pkwy, East Providence
  - Demolished.
- 1921 – North Smithfield Memorial Town Building (former), 1 Main St, Slatersville
  - A contributing resource to the NRHP-listed Slatersville Historic District.
- 1924 – Park Theatre, 848 Park Ave, Cranston
- 1927 – Cranston High School East, 899 Park Ave, Cranston
- 1928 – Frank C. Angell Memorial Town Hall, 2000 Smith St, Centredale
- 1928 – East Providence Junior High School (former), 20 Whelden Ave, East Providence
- 1929 – Masonic Temple, 2121 Smith St, Centredale
- 1931 – Edward S. Rhodes School, 160 Shaw Ave, Cranston
  - A contributing resource to the NRHP-listed Edgewood Historic District–Shaw Plat.
- 1936 – Buildings for Disturbed Men and Women (former), Eleanor Slater Hospital, Cranston

=== In Kent County, Rhode Island ===
- 1886 – District Four School, 1515 W Shore Rd, Warwick
  - NRHP-listed.
- 1894 - Warwick City Hall, 3275 Post Rd, Warwick
  - A contributing resource to the NRHP-listed Warwick Civic Center Historic District.
- 1909 – Kent County Courthouse reconstruction, 125 Main St, East Greenwich
  - Originally completed in 1805 to designs by master builder Oliver Wickes. NRHP-listed, also a contributing resource to the NRHP-listed East Greenwich Historic District.
- 1912 – Kentish Artillery Armory, 3259 Post Rd, Warwick
  - A contributing resource to the NRHP-listed Warwick Civic Center Historic District.
- 1915 – Phenix Trust Company Building, 704 Main St, West Warwick
  - Demolished.
- 1927 – West Warwick Junior High School (former), 124 Providence St, West Warwick
- 1935 – Nelson W. Aldrich High School (former), 789 Post Rd, Warwick

=== In Bristol County, Rhode Island ===
- 1883 – St. Mary's Catholic Church, 645 Main St, Warren
  - Demolished.
- 1889 – George Hail Free Library, 530 Main St, Warren
  - A contributing resource to the NRHP-listed Warren Waterfront Historic District.
- 1891 – St. Matthew's Episcopal Church, 5 Chapel Rd, Barrington
  - NRHP-listed.
- 1894 - Warren Town Hall, 514 Main St, Warren, Rhode Island
  - A contributing resource to the NRHP-listed Warren Waterfront Historic District.
- 1896 – Walley School, 260 High St, Bristol
  - A contributing resource to the NRHP-listed Bristol Waterfront Historic District.
- 1901 – Oliver School, 151 State St, Bristol
  - A contributing resource to the NRHP-listed Bristol Waterfront Historic District.

=== In Washington County, Rhode Island ===
- 1902 – Westerly Armory, 8 Dixon St, Westerly
  - NRHP-listed.
- 1908 – North Kingstown High School (former), 99 Phillips St, Wickford
- 1912 – Westerly Town Hall and Courthouse, 45 Broad St, Westerly
  - A contributing resource to the NRHP-listed Westerly Downtown Historic District.

=== In Massachusetts ===
- 1882 – First Universalist Church, 43 N Washington St, North Attleborough
  - Demolished.
- 1885 – Centenary United Methodist Church, 15 Sanford St, Attleboro
- 1885 – William H. Smith house, 185 S Main St, Attleboro
- 1886 – Goff Memorial Building, 124 Bay State Rd, Rehoboth
  - Burned in 1911.
- 1888 – Mellen House, N Main and Franklin Sts, Fall River
  - Burned in 1943.
- 1889 – Byron W. Anthony house, 527 Rock St, Fall River
  - A contributing resource to the NRHP-listed Highlands Historic District.
- 1890 – Fall River City Hall, 40 S Main St, Fall River
  - Incorporating the granite walls of the original city hall, which was completed in 1846 and burned in 1886. The costly construction project was considered farcical by the local press; in August 1890 the Fall River Daily Globe editorialized that "[t]he new city hall should be formally opened with a lecture by Architect Walker upon 'The Mistakes of Moses and Myself.'" Demolished in the 1960s.
- 1890 – Fall River National Bank Building, 59 N Main St, Fall River
  - A contributing resource to the NRHP-listed Downtown Fall River Historic District.
- 1891 – Walter G. Clark house, 264 S Washington St, North Attleborough
  - A contributing resource to the NRHP-listed South Washington Street Historic District.
- 1892 – Edward H. B. Brow house, 526 Highland Ave, Fall River
  - A contributing resource to the NRHP-listed Highlands Historic District.
- 1904 – Bronson Building, 8 N Main St, Attleboro
- 1910 – Attleboro Armory, 91 Pine St, Attleboro
- 1918 – Empire Theatre, 166 S Main St, Fall River
  - Demolished.
- 1918 – Sanford Building, 1 Park St, Attleboro
- 1925 – First National Bank Building, 19 Park St, Attleboro
- 1932 – Smart Memorial Library (former), 536 Fall River Ave, Swansea
  - A contributing resource to the NRHP-listed Luther's Corner historic district.
- 1936 – Hiram Lake Chapel, Rehoboth Village Cemetery, Rehoboth

=== In other states ===
- 1884 – Ponemah Mill No. 2, 555 Norwich Ave, Taftville, Connecticut
  - A contributing resource to the NRHP-listed Taftville historic district.
- 1891 – Maple Grove remodeling, 301 South Rd, Poughkeepsie, New York
  - NRHP-listed.
- 1893 – Henry P. Kinkead House, 403 Walnut St, Lexington, Kentucky
  - NRHP-listed.
- 1905 – Narragansett Hotel, 149 Beach Ave, Kennebunk, Maine
