= Warwick Civic Center Historic District =

Historic district in Rhode Island, United States

- U.S. National Register of Historic Places
- U.S. Historic district
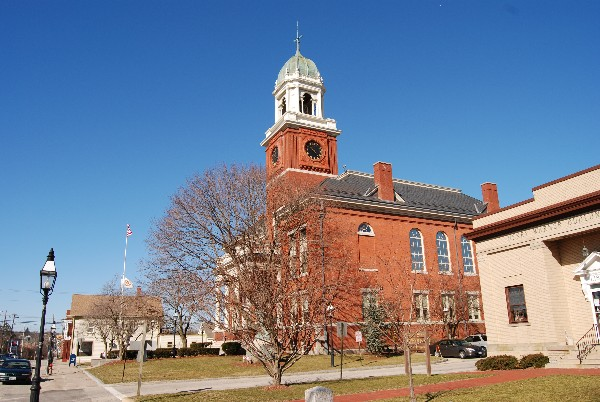

- Location within Rhode Island Location within the United States
- Location: Warwick, Rhode Island
- Coordinates: 41°41′57″N 71°27′31″W
- Built: 1890
- Architect: William R. Walker & Son; Hoppin, Field & Peirce; Jackson, Robertson & Adams
- Architectural style: Colonial Revival
- NRHP reference No.: 80000079
- Added to NRHP: June 27, 1980

The Warwick Civic Center Historic District is a historic district encompassing three buildings at the civic heart of Warwick, Rhode Island.

== History ==
The three buildings are Warwick City Hall, the Henry Warner Budlong Memorial Library, and the Kentish Artillery Armory. Prior to its demolition, the Old Fire Station was also included. The first three buildings line the north side of Post Road just east of the junction of US Route 1 and Rhode Island Route 117, where the village of Apponaug was established in the 17th century. All were built between 1890 and 1925; the fire station, which then housed social services agencies, was, before its demolition, the oldest.

The district was listed on the National Register of Historic Places in 1980.

== Contributing properties ==
=== Kentish Artillery Armory, 3259 Post Road ===
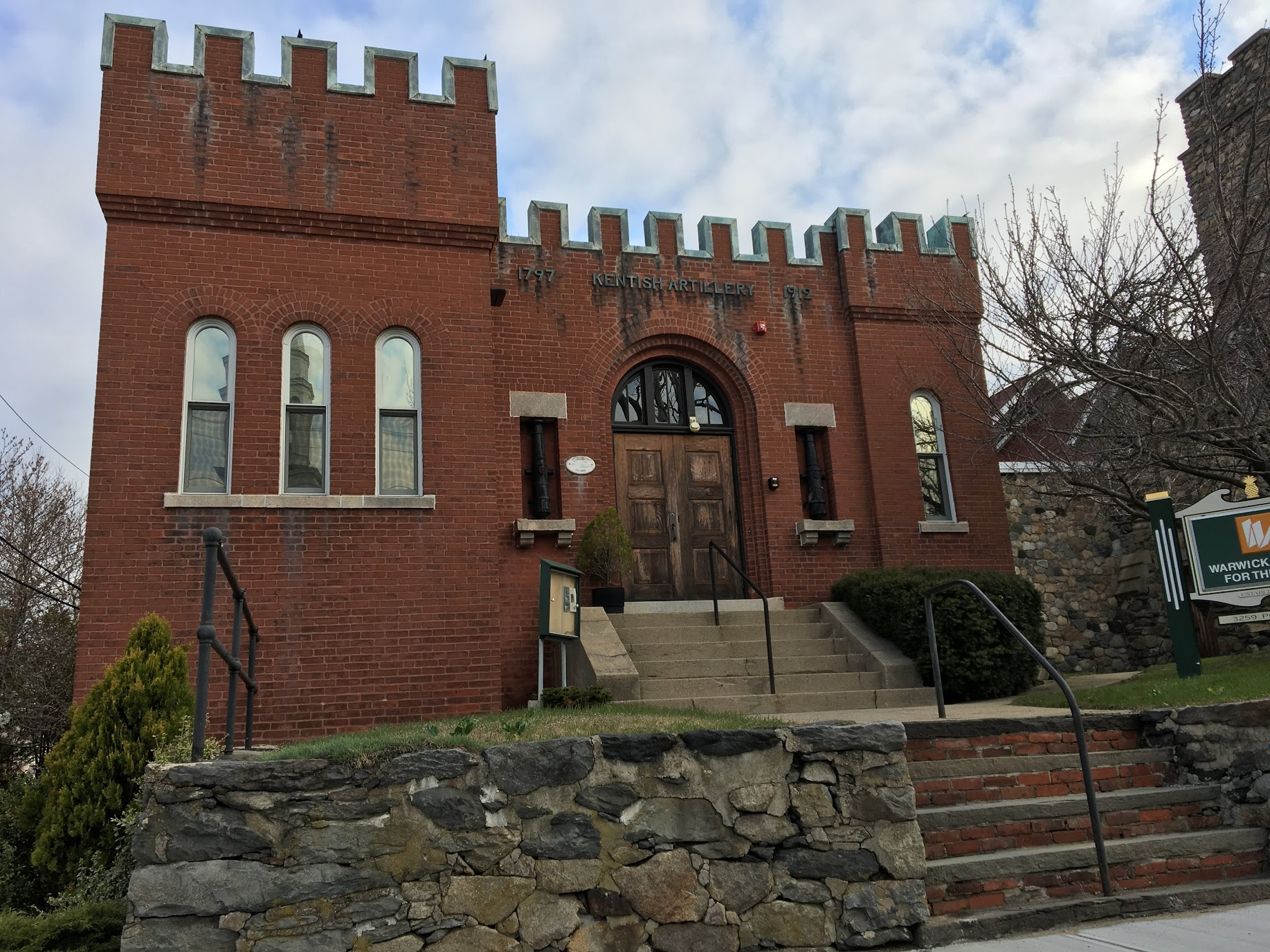
Kentish Artillery Armory, 2018

This building was built in 1912 on the site of a former armory, built in 1854, that had been destroyed by fire. The old building was in the Greek Revival style, like Apponaug's other early civic buildings. Designed by prolific Rhode Island architects William R. Walker & Son, the new building was designed in what was at the time called "a castellated style". The building was occupied for armory purposes until 1977, when the last member of the Kentish Guard died. At that time the building was deeded to the city, which rented the building to the Warwick Museum, now the Warwick Museum of Art, which has remained there ever since.

Formerly mounted on the building's facade were two cannons which dated back to the American Revolution. They went missing in 1972, and they have never been found. Taking their place are two wooden replicas.

=== Former Fire Station, 3265 Post Road ===
Built circa 1890, Apponaug's former fire station was a much altered Queen Anne style wooden building. After outliving its use as a fire station, the building was used as the offices of social service agencies and the municipal employees' credit union. Since the district's listing on the NRHP, this building has been demolished.

=== Henry Warner Budlong Memorial Library, 3267 Post Road ===
This building, now the Apponaug branch of the Warwick Public Library, was built in 1924-25 to serve as the home of the Apponaug Free Library Association. The money for the construction was given by Henry W. Budlong, a prominent local philanthropist. It was designed by the Providence firm of Hoppin, Field & Peirce in a very plain version of the Classical Revival style. The building's front entrance was originally ornamented by two Tuscan columns, but these were removed sometime in the 1970s. The original doors have also been replaced, but the ormantal hood still remains.

Architect Howard Hoppin was also the architect of the nearby St. Barnabas Episcopal Church, several years before.

=== Warwick City Hall, 3275 Post Road ===
This, the largest building in the district, was also designed by William R. Walker & Son. It replaced an assortment of town buildings, which were built in 1834-35 in the Greek Revival style. The building, designed in the Queen Anne and Colonial Revival styles, is an important local landmark. When the towns of Warwick and West Warwick were split, it was one of two major buildings of contention in the proceedings. Warwick kept the Town Hall, while West Warwick, the denser of the towns, kept the former High School. In 1929 the town built an addition on the rear of the building, to contain the city archives. This was designed by Jackson, Robertson & Adams.

On the grounds is the city's World War I memorial, dedicated in 1919 and designed by Warwick sculptor John G. Hardy, who was also commissioned for memorials in North Providence as well as in Templeton, Massachusetts.

After falling into a period of decline, City Hall was restored beginning in the 1980s. The first phase focused on the exterior, while interior restoration continued into the 1990s. Further restoration work, completed in 2013, brought the tower's bell and clock back into working order.

== See also ==
- National Register of Historic Places listings in Warwick, Rhode Island
