= Smith Street Primary School =

- U.S. National Register of Historic Places
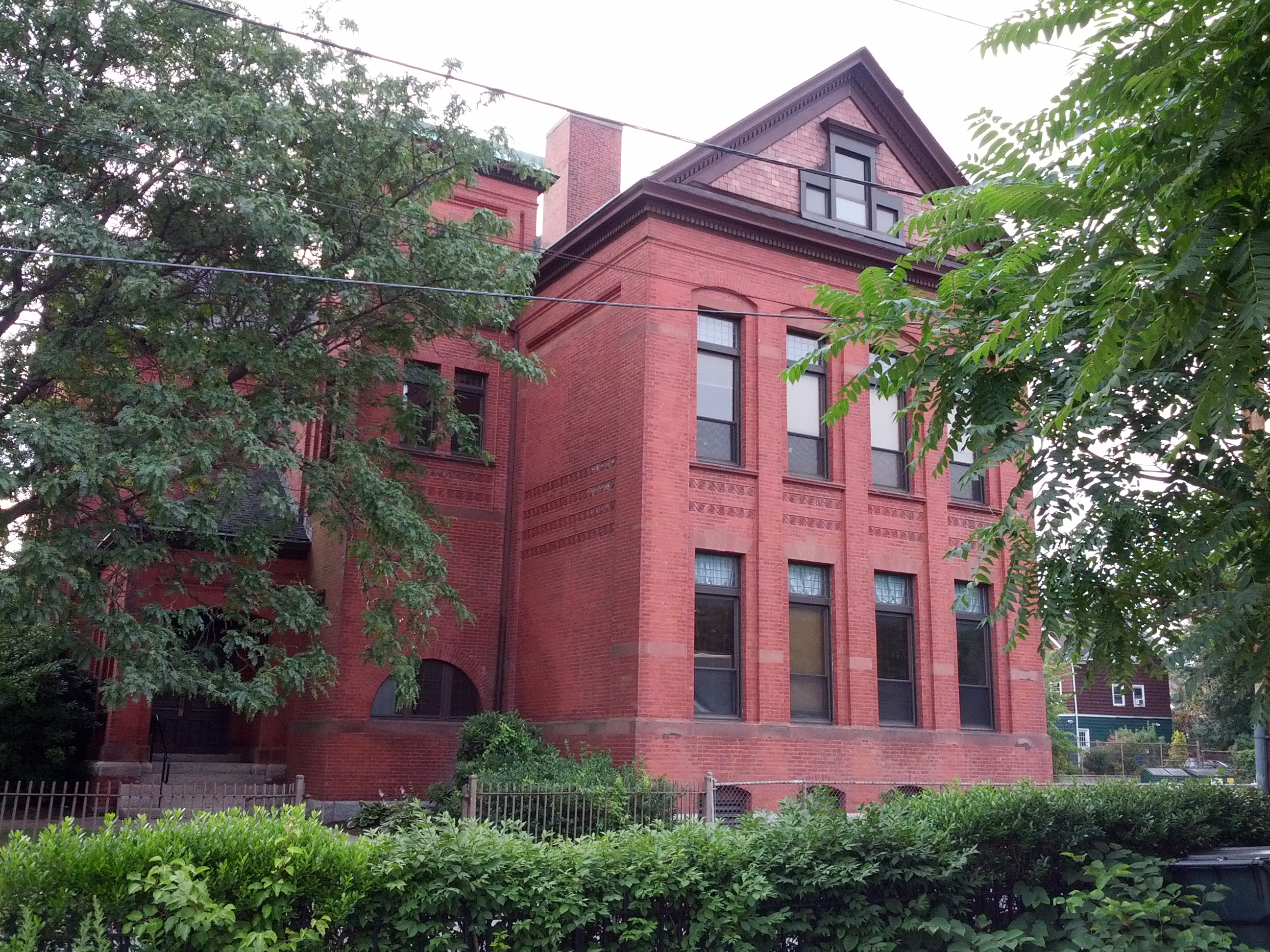

- Location within Rhode Island Location within the United States
- Location: Providence, Rhode Island
- Coordinates: 41°50′2″N 71°25′30″W
- Built: 1885
- Architect: William R. Walker & Son
- Architectural style: Queen Anne
- NRHP reference No.: 84002050
- Added to NRHP: February 23, 1984

The Smith Street Primary School is an historic school at 396 Smith Street in Providence, Rhode Island. It is a large 2 1/2-story brick structure with a cross-gable roof. It was designed in Queen Anne style by William R. Walker & Son and built in 1885. The building occupies its site at an unusual angle, partially overhanging the sidewalk, and has an asymmetrical interior, a departure from the other schools the Walkers designed for the city.

It was used as a school facility until 1967, and then housed administrative offices for twenty years. By the early 1980s it was in use as the Smith Hill Center—a non-profit neighborhood community service agency.

It is one of three (out of fifteen) surviving schools built by the city in the 1880s.

The building was listed on the National Register of Historic Places in 1984.

== See also ==
- National Register of Historic Places listings in Providence, Rhode Island
