= Maple Grove (Poughkeepsie, New York) =

Historic house in New York, United States

- U.S. National Register of Historic Places
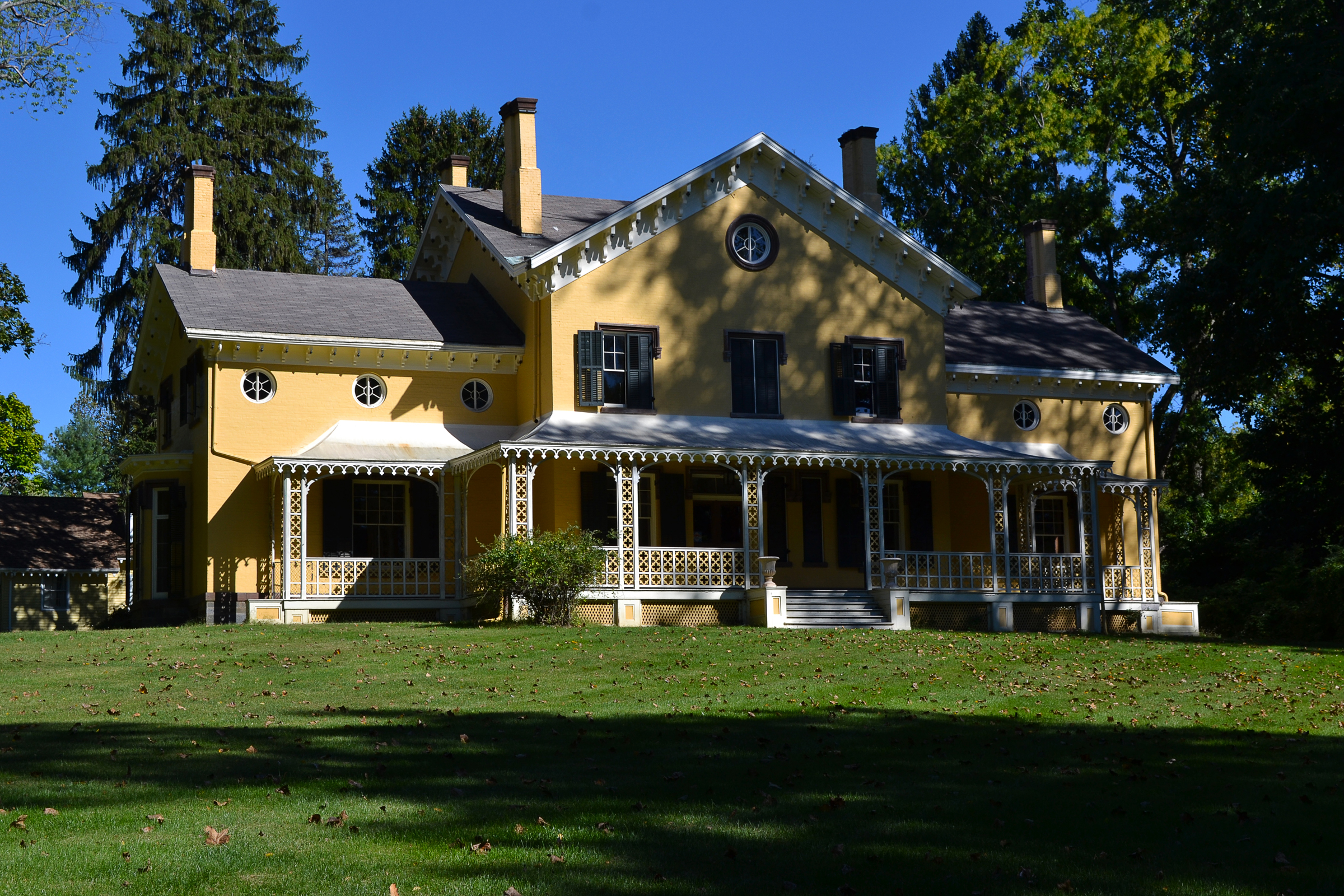
- The main house in September 2015

- Location within New York Location within the United States
- Location: 301 S. Rd., US 9, Poughkeepsie, New York
- Coordinates: 41°40′52″N 73°55′39″W
- Area: 22 acres (8.9 ha)
- Built: 1850
- Architect: William R. Walker & Son
- Architectural style: Italianate
- NRHP reference No.: 01000293
- Added to NRHP: March 29, 2001

Maple Grove is a historic estate located at Poughkeepsie, Dutchess County, New York. The estate consists of eight contributing buildings: the main house, farmer's cottage (c. 1850), barn (c. 1850), carriage barn (c. 1850), garage (c. 1850), shed, and two cottages (c. 1830). Also on the property is a pair of contributing sandstone gateposts (c. 1850). The main house was built in 1850 in the Italianate style and remodeled in 1891. It is constructed of painted red brick and has a 2 1/2-story, three-bay, main block flanked by 2-story, three-bay-wide wings. It has a large, 2-story rear kitchen wing. It features a prominent 1-story open wood porch.

It was added to the National Register of Historic Places in 2001.
