= Covell Street School =

- U.S. National Register of Historic Places
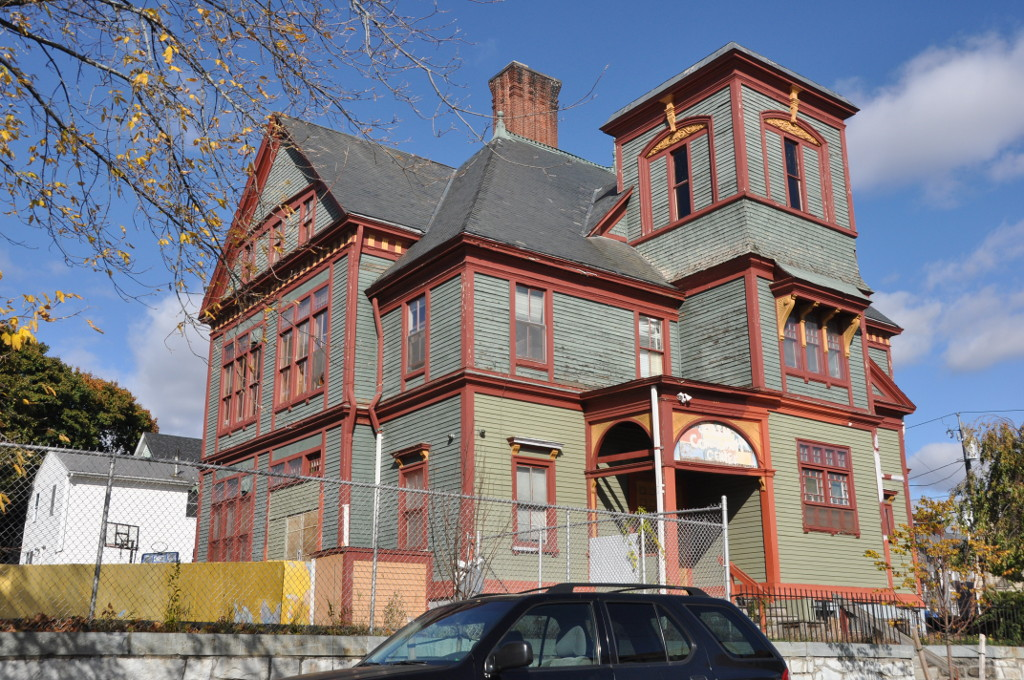

- Location within Rhode Island Location within the United States
- Location: Providence, Rhode Island
- Coordinates: 41°49′24″N 71°26′51″W
- Built: 1885-86
- Architect: W. R. Walker & Son; J. L. Sprague & Co.
- Architectural style: Queen Anne
- NRHP reference No.: 76000044
- Added to NRHP: September 30, 1976

The Covell Street School (or Joslin Multi-Service Center) is an historic school building at 231 Amherst Street in Providence, Rhode Island. It is a two-story wood-frame structure built in a typically elaborate Queen Anne style. Although it is basically rectangular in plan, its roofline and exterior are busy, with a complicated group of cross gables, hip-roof sections, with projecting and recessed sections. A three-story square tower rises from the center of the main facade. Built in 1885 and opened in 1886, it is one of Providence's last surviving 19th-century neighborhood school buildings. It was designed by the local firm of William R. Walker & Son, designers of many Rhode Island civic buildings. The builders were John L. Sprague & Company.

The building was listed on the National Register of Historic Places in 1976.

== See also ==
- National Register of Historic Places listings in Providence, Rhode Island
