= Westerly Armory =

- U.S. National Register of Historic Places
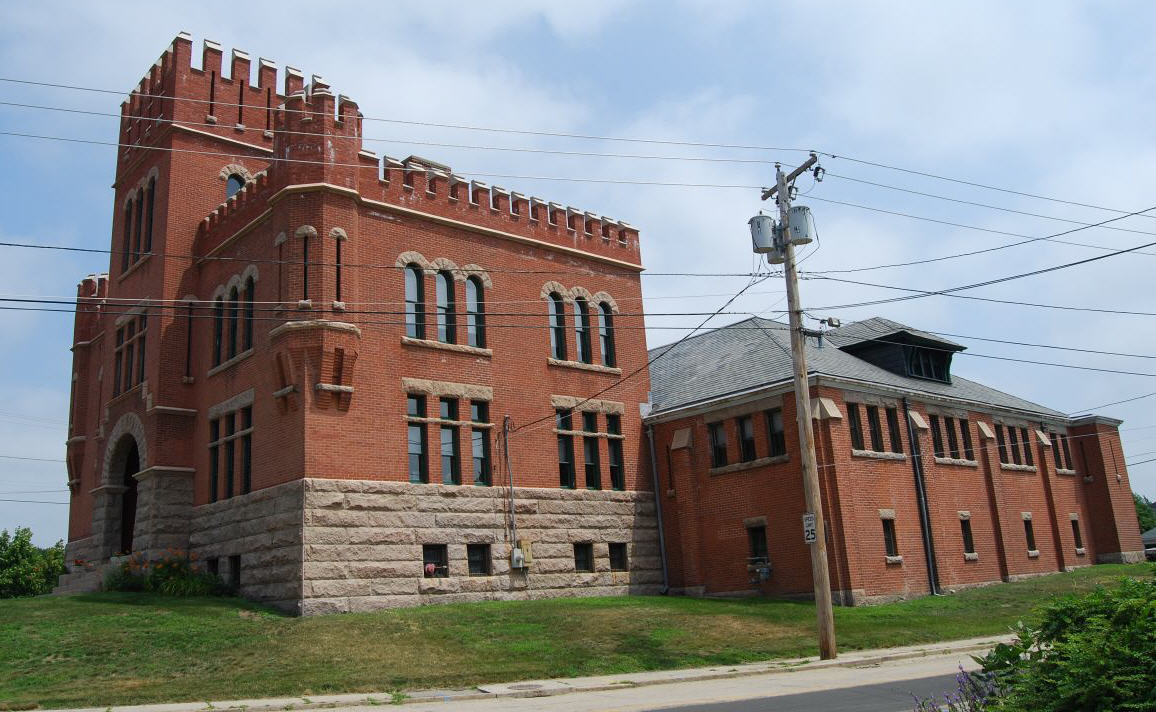

- Location within Rhode Island Location within the United States
- Location: Westerly, Rhode Island
- Coordinates: 41°22′55″N 71°49′40″W
- Built: 1901
- Architect: William R. Walker & Son; J. C. Walsh Company
- Architectural style: Romanesque
- NRHP reference No.: 96001322
- Added to NRHP: November 7, 1996

The Westerly Armory is an historic National Guard armory building located on Railroad Avenue, west of downtown Westerly, Rhode Island.

== History ==
The armory was built in 1901 to replace another destroyed armory. It was designed by William R. Walker & Son, a firm that designed several other armories and public buildings in Rhode Island during the late 19th and early 20th century. The building was added to the National Register of Historic Places in the fall of 1996. The "Armory serves presently as a museum of military and community memorabilia, a social and cultural center for the area, and home to the Westerly Band (oldest civic band in the country) and its historic library."

== See also ==
- Cranston Street Armory
- Pawtucket Armory
- National Register of Historic Places listings in Washington County, Rhode Island
