= Church Hill Grammar School =

- U.S. National Register of Historic Places
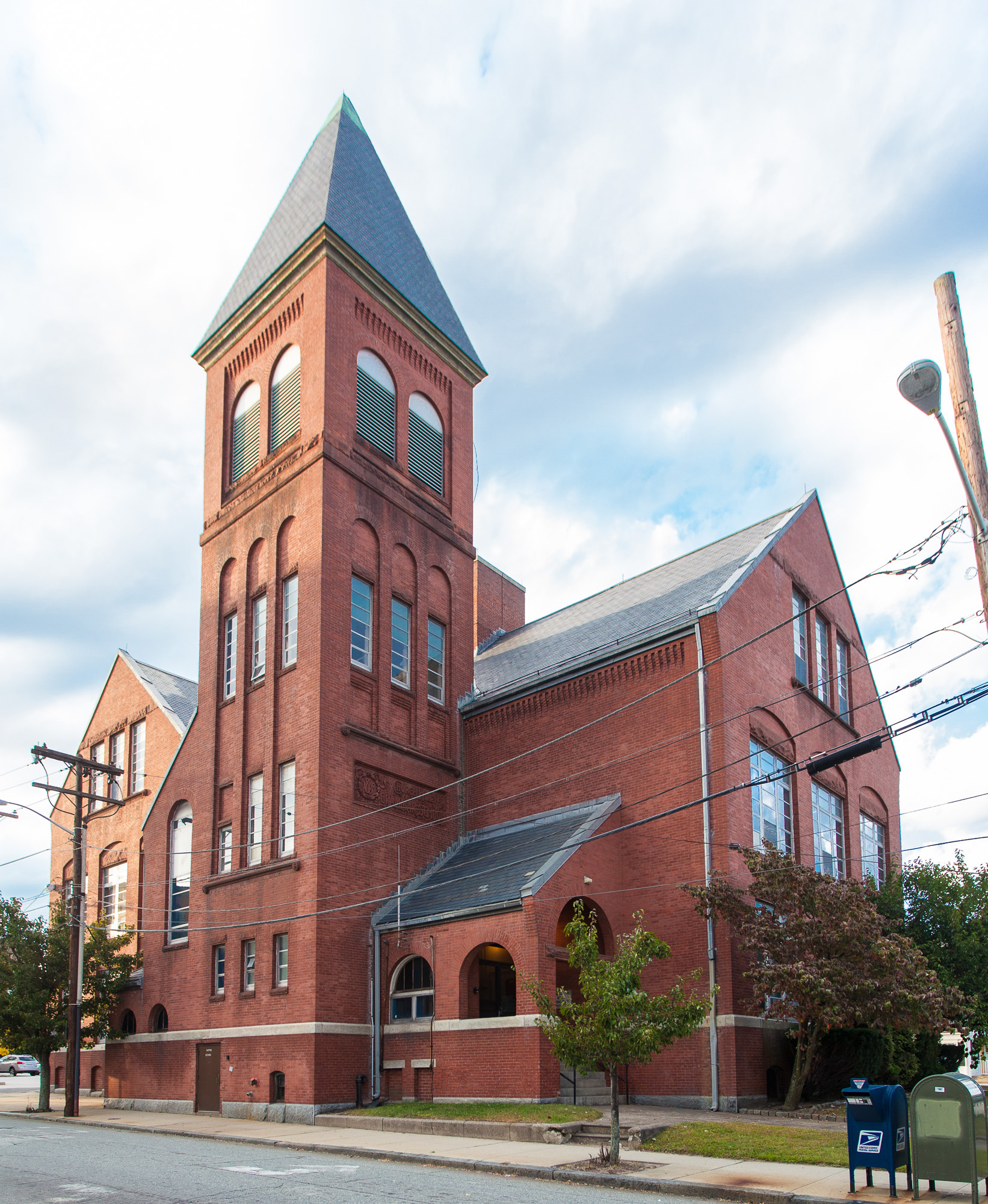
- 2012 view

- Location within Rhode Island Location within the United States
- Location: 81 Park Pl., Pawtucket, Rhode Island
- Coordinates: 41°52′33″N 71°23′18″W
- Area: 0.4 acres (0.16 ha)
- Built: 1889
- Architect: William R. Walker & Son
- Architectural style: Queen Anne
- NRHP reference No.: 10000165
- Added to NRHP: April 23, 2010

The Church Hill Grammar School, now the Edward J. Creamer Pawtucket School Administration Building, is a historic school building at 81 Park Place in Pawtucket, Rhode Island. It is a 2 1/2-story structure, finished in brick trimmed with granite. It is an elegant example of Queen Anne styling, designed by the Providence firm of William R. Walker & Son and built in 1889–90. It has a cross-gabled slate roof, a prominent bell tower with pyramidal roof, and entrances recessed under shed-roof porches. The building served as a school until 1946, and then as an administration building until 2006.

The building was listed on the National Register of Historic Places in 2010. From 2018 to 2021, the former school was converted into a collection of 14 residential apartments.

== Gallery ==
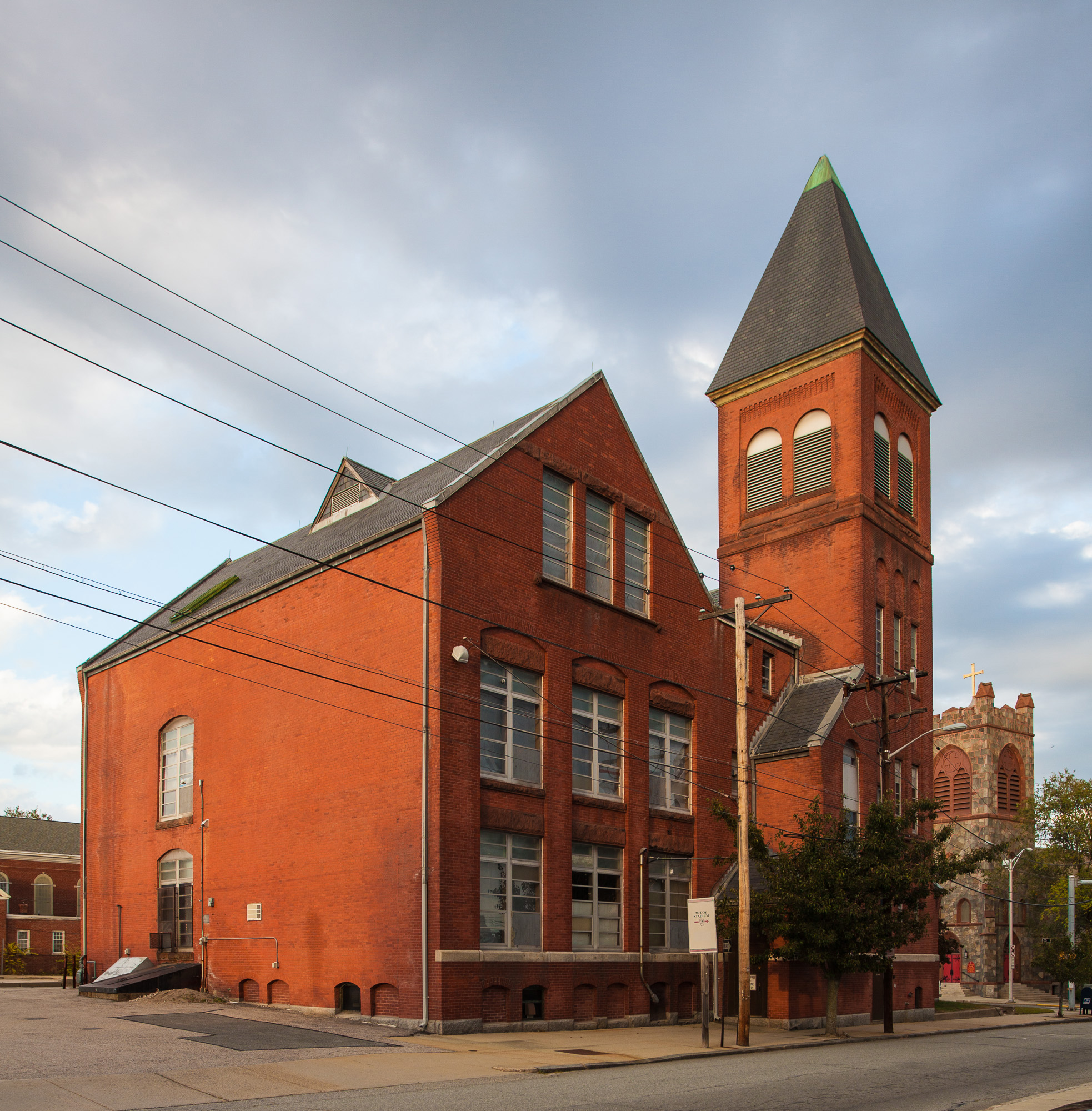
Side View in 2012

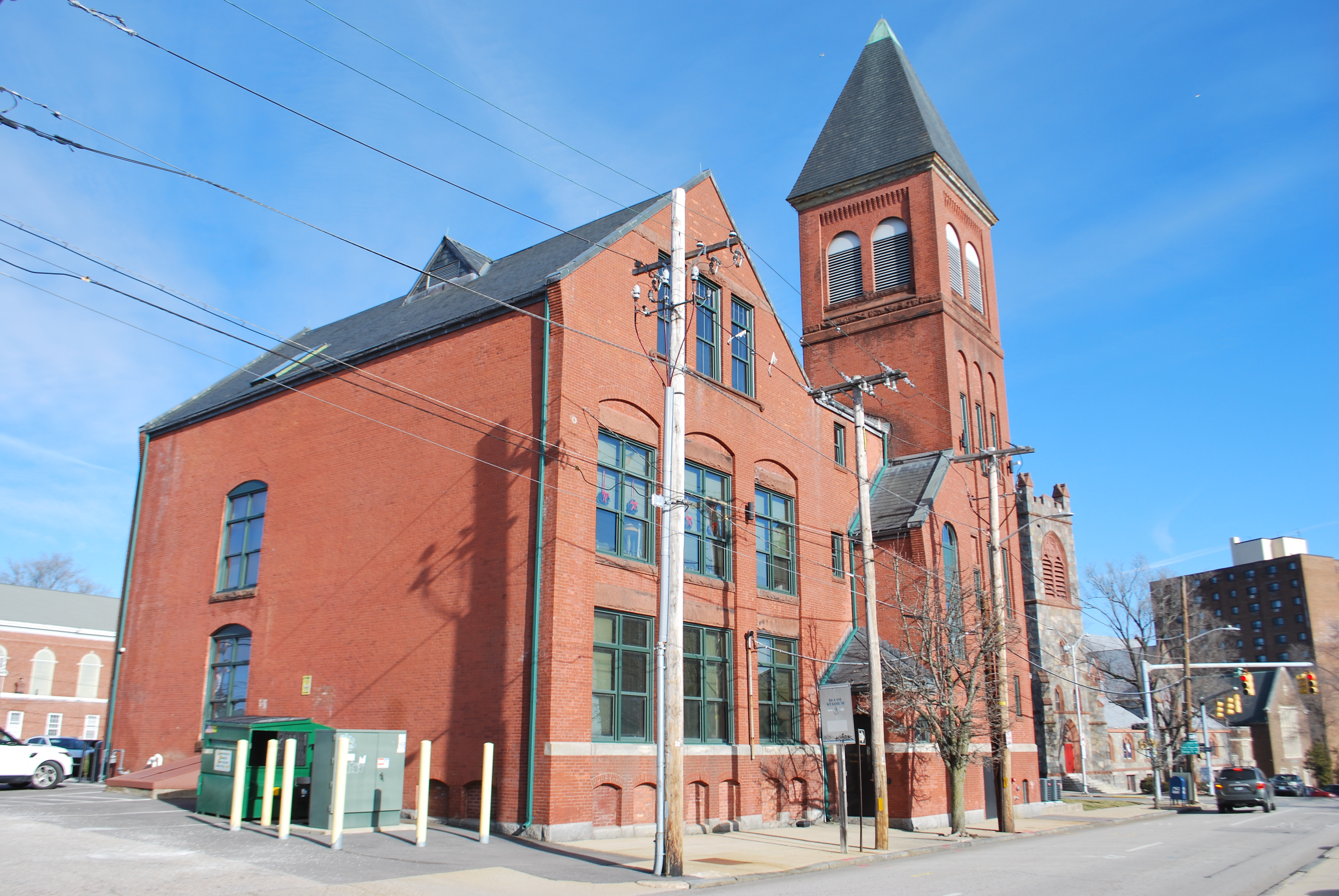
View looking north northeast at the western and southern elevations of the Church Street Grammar School, 2024

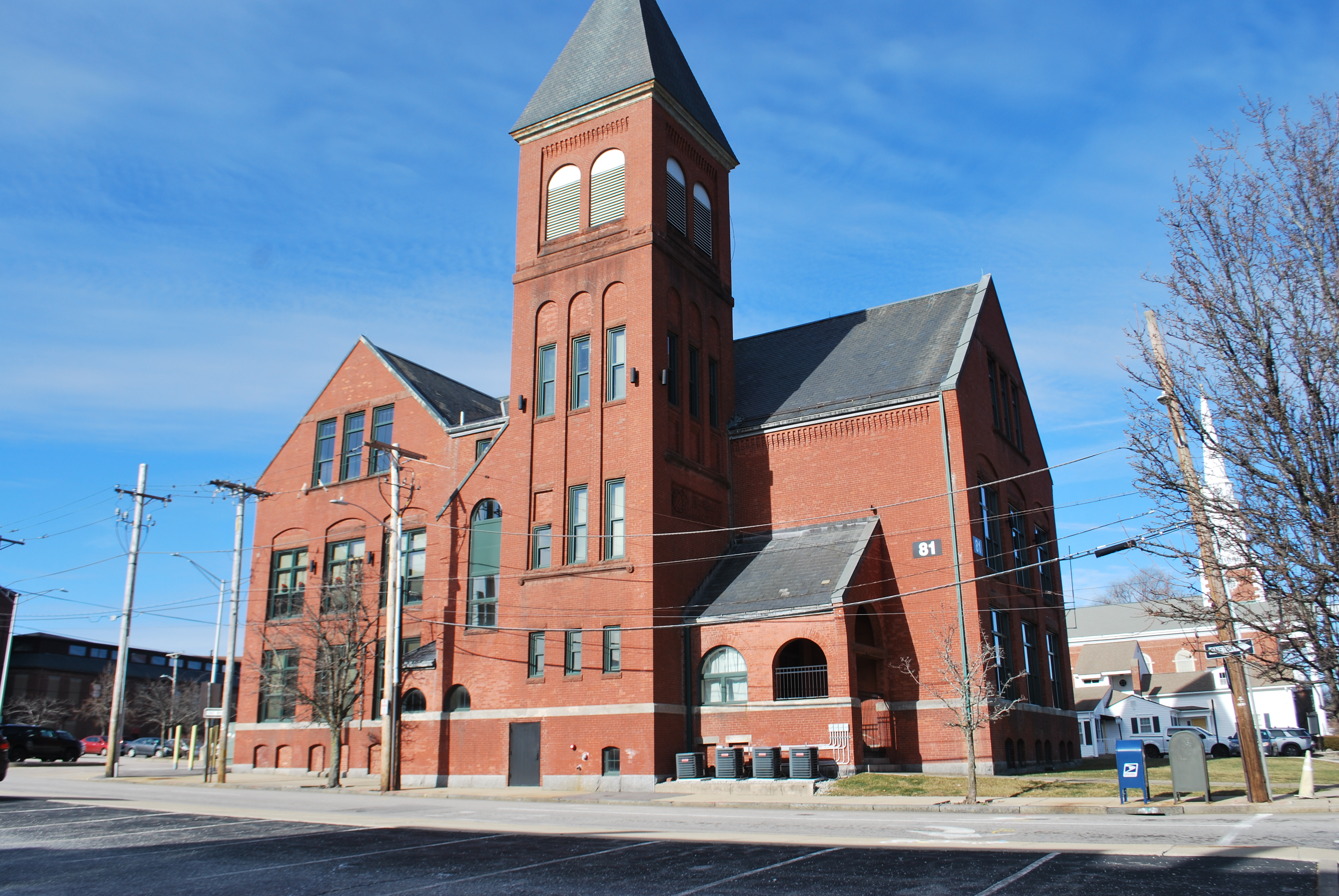
View looking north northwest at the southern elevation of the Church Street Grammar School, 2024

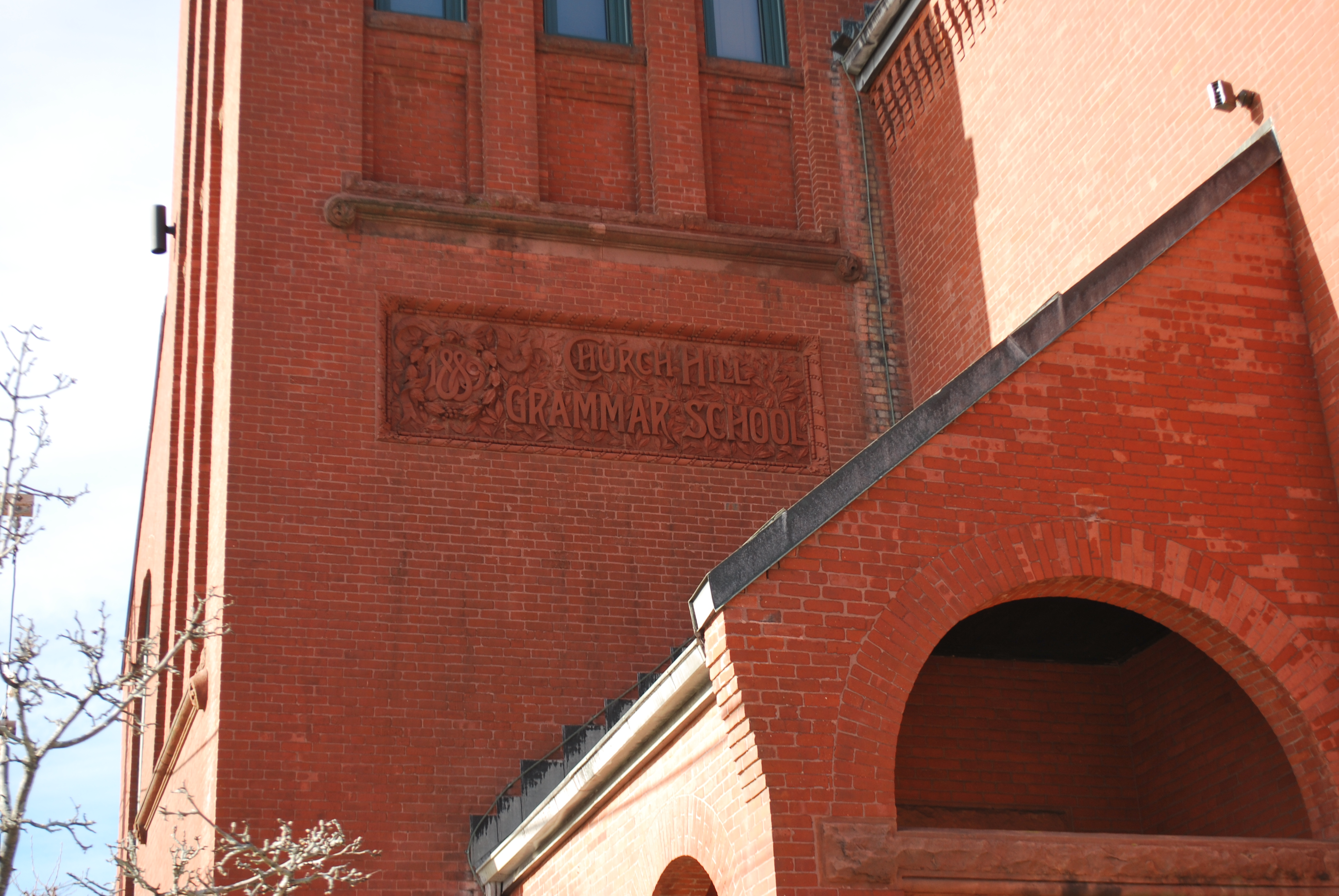
View looking north northeast at the western and southern elevations of the Church Street Grammar School, 2024

== See also ==
- National Register of Historic Places listings in Pawtucket, Rhode Island
