= Christ Episcopal Church (Providence, Rhode Island) =

Historic church in Rhode Island, United States

- U.S. National Register of Historic Places
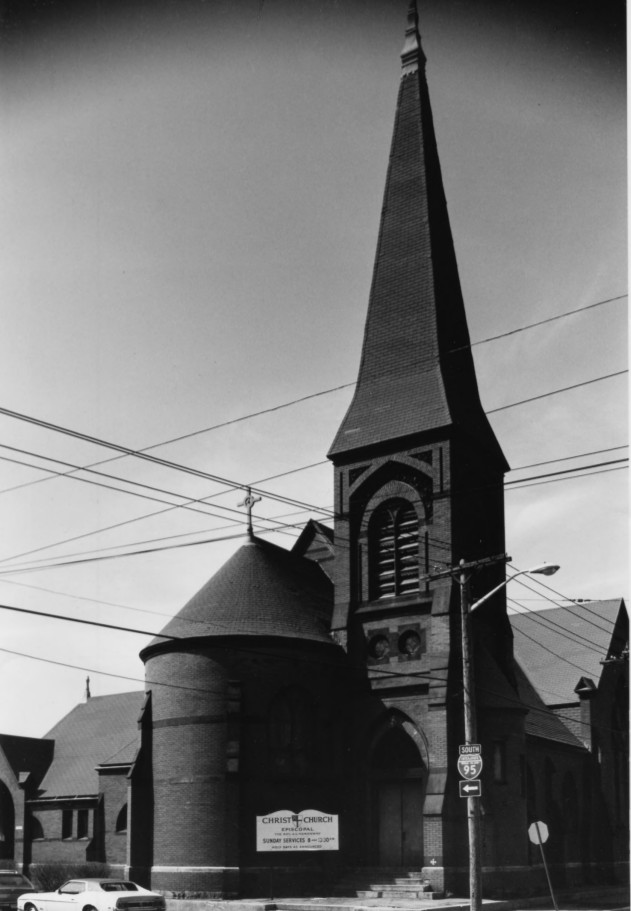
- 1976 photo

- Location within Rhode Island Location within the United States
- Location: 909 Eddy St., Providence, Rhode Island
- Coordinates: 41°48′9″N 71°24′27″W
- Built: 1888
- Architect: William R. Walker & Son
- Architectural style: Gothic
- NRHP reference No.: 76000043
- Added to NRHP: June 30, 1976

Christ Episcopal Church was an historic Episcopal church at 909 Eddy Street in Providence, Rhode Island. It housed a congregation of the Episcopal Diocese of Rhode Island.

The Gothic church was built in 1888 by William R. Walker & Son and added to the National Register of Historic Places in 1976.

The church sat empty for a number of years after being closed in 1981, and began to deteriorate, earning it a place on the Providence Preservation Society annual 10 Most Endangered Properties List in 1999 and again in 2003. The building was demolished in January, 2006.

== See also ==
- National Register of Historic Places listings in Providence, Rhode Island
