= Wayland Historic District =

Historic district in Rhode Island, United States

Coordinates: 41°49′56.3″N 71°23′5.7″W

- U.S. National Register of Historic Places
- U.S. Historic district
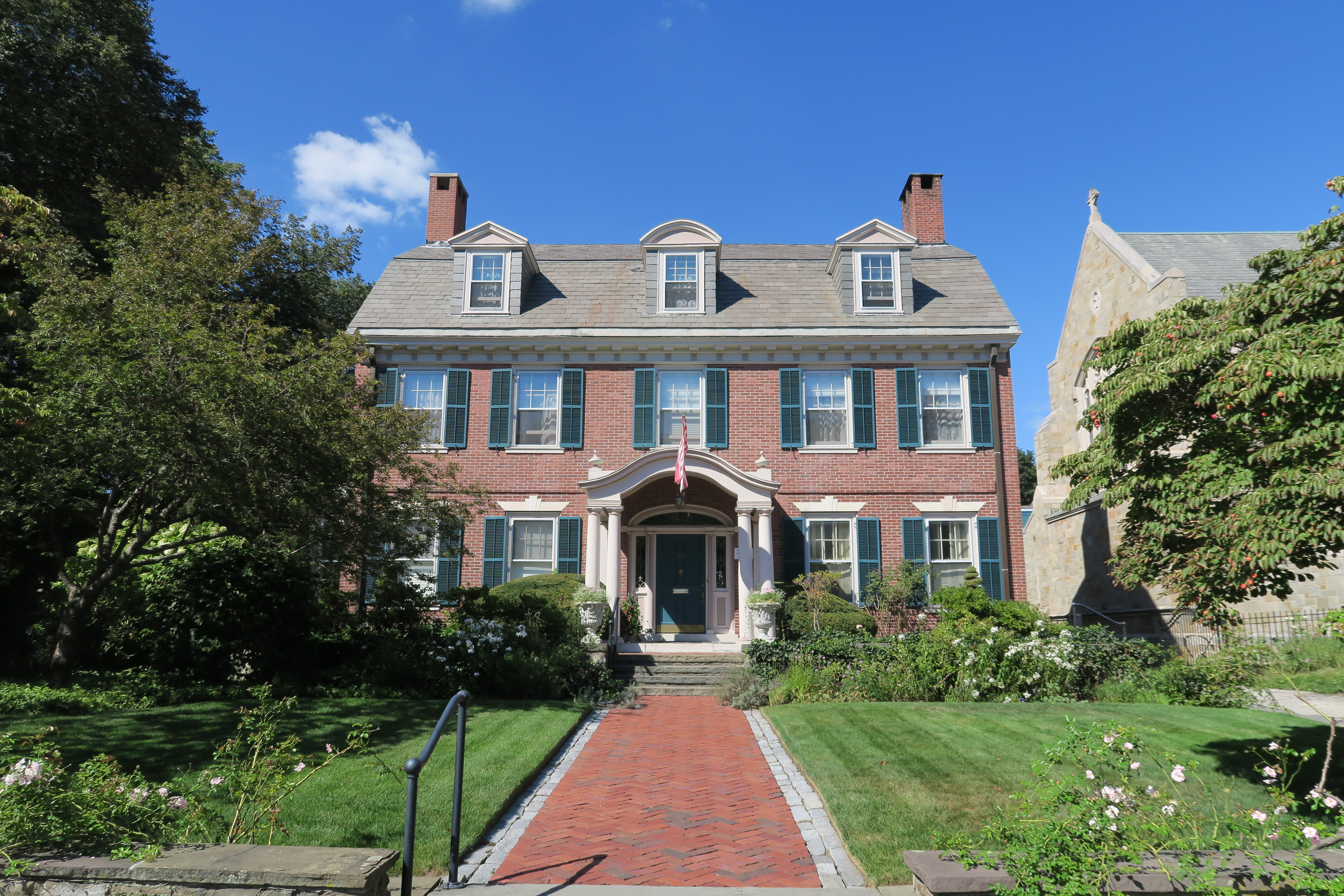
- Built for Annie C. Barker

- Location within Rhode Island Location within the United States
- Location: Providence, Rhode Island
- Area: 122 acres (49 ha)
- Built: 1872
- Architectural style: Colonial Revival, Queen Anne
- NRHP reference No.: 05001399
- Added to NRHP: December 8, 2005

The Wayland Historic District is a predominantly residential historic district on the east side of Providence, Rhode Island.

It is a large area, covering about 122 acres (49 ha), bounded roughly on the north by Everett and Laurel Avenues, on the east by Blackstone Boulevard and Butler Avenue, on the west by Arlington Avenue, and on the south by Angell and South Angell Streets.

This area, which was in the 19th century part of the Moses Brown farm, was platted for development in 1891, with most of the construction taking place in the early decades of the 20th century. Most of the residential properties in the district are single-family houses, typically built in revival styles popular at the time. They are set on similarly sized lots with fairly uniform setbacks, and were typically built without garages (which were often added later). There are a number of two-family houses, and a few apartment buildings, most of which are found on the arterial roads of the area.

There are several religious buildings, including several churches; the most architecturally distinctive religious building is the Jewish Temple Beth El, built 1951–54.

The district was listed on the National Register of Historic Places in 2005.

== See also ==
- National Register of Historic Places listings in Providence, Rhode Island
