= Bell Street =

Bell Street may refer to:

== Roads and streets ==
- State (Bell/Springvale) Highway in Melbourne, Victoria, Australia

== Public transit ==
- Ipswich railway station, Queensland, also known as Bell Street bus station

== Other uses ==
- Bell Street Park in Seattle, Washington, United States
- Bell Street Pier in Seattle, Washington, United States
- Bell Street Chapel in Providence, Rhode Island, United States
- Bell Street United Church in Ottawa, Ontario, Canada
- Jongno in Seoul, South Korea, Literally 'Bell Street'
