= William R. Walker (architect) =

American architect (1830–1905)

William Russell Walker
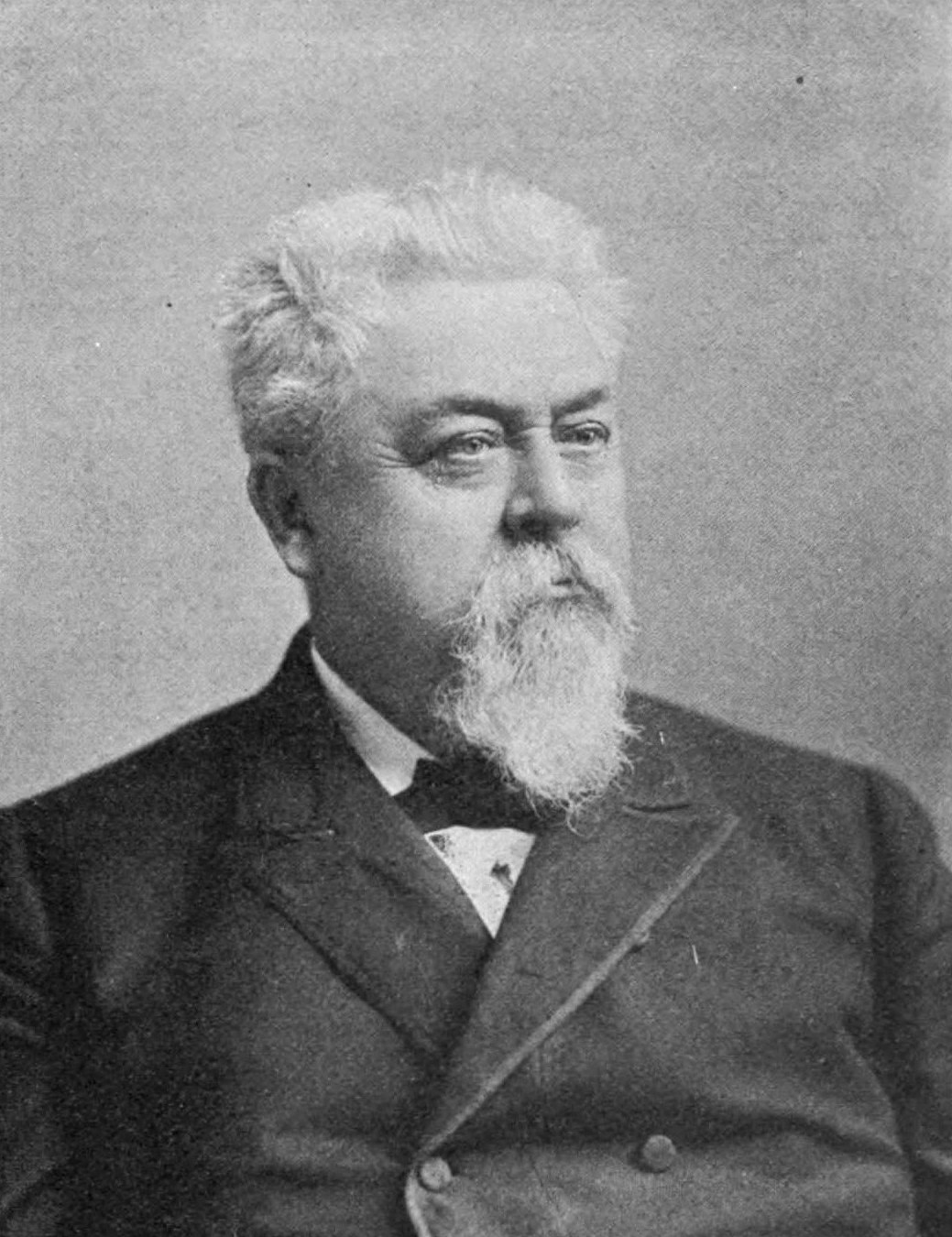
- William R. Walker, c. 1891
- Born: April 14, 1830; Seekonk, Massachusetts, US
- Died: March 11, 1905 (aged 74); Pawtucket, Rhode Island, US
- Occupation: Architect
- Spouse: Eliza Billings Hall
- Practice: William R. Walker; Walker & Gould; William R. Walker & Son
- Buildings: Isaac Davis House (1872); Bell Street Chapel (1875); Clouds Hill (1877); Robinson Hall (1878)

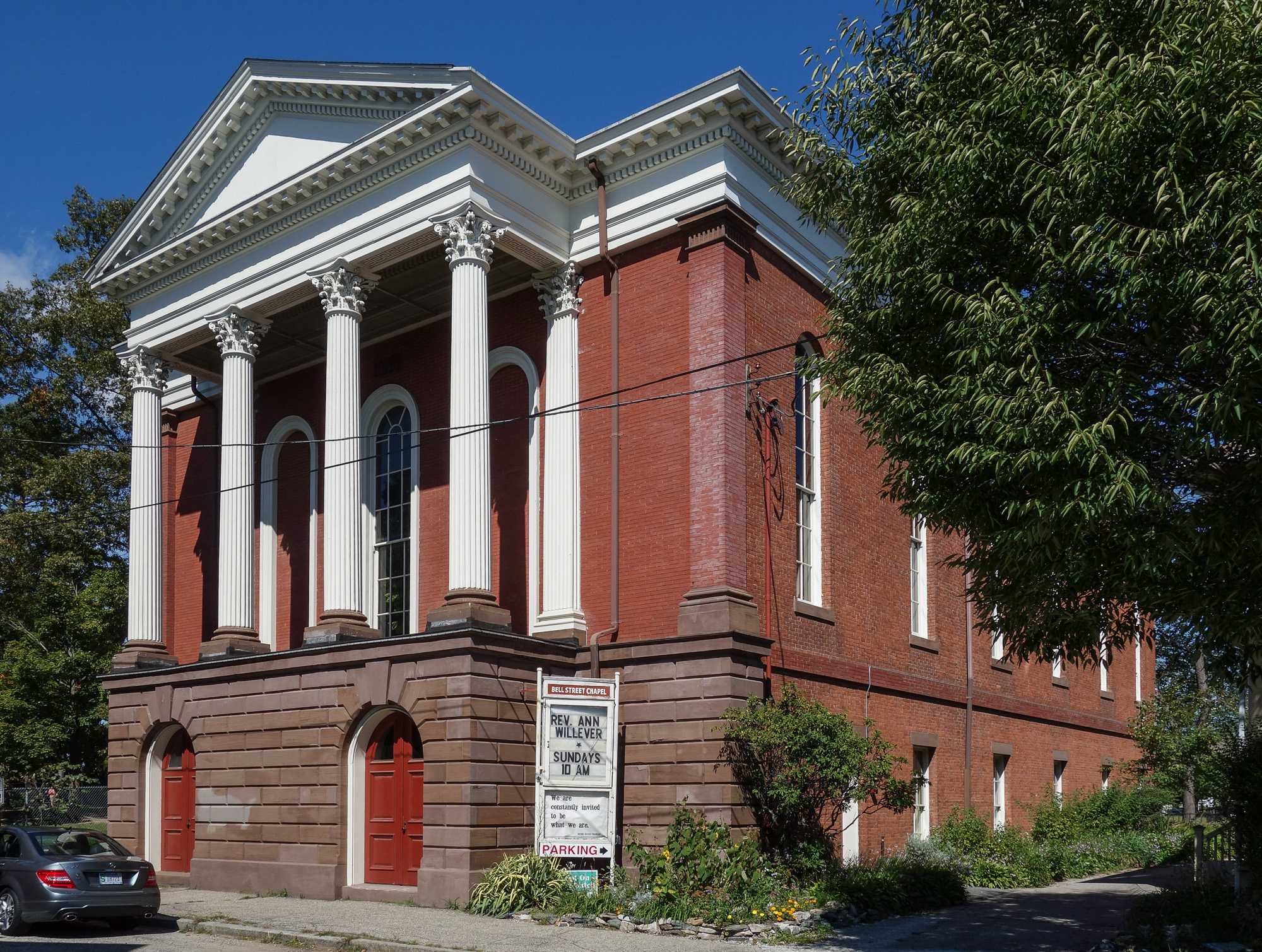
The Bell Street Chapel in Providence, designed by Walker in the Neoclassical style and completed in 1875.

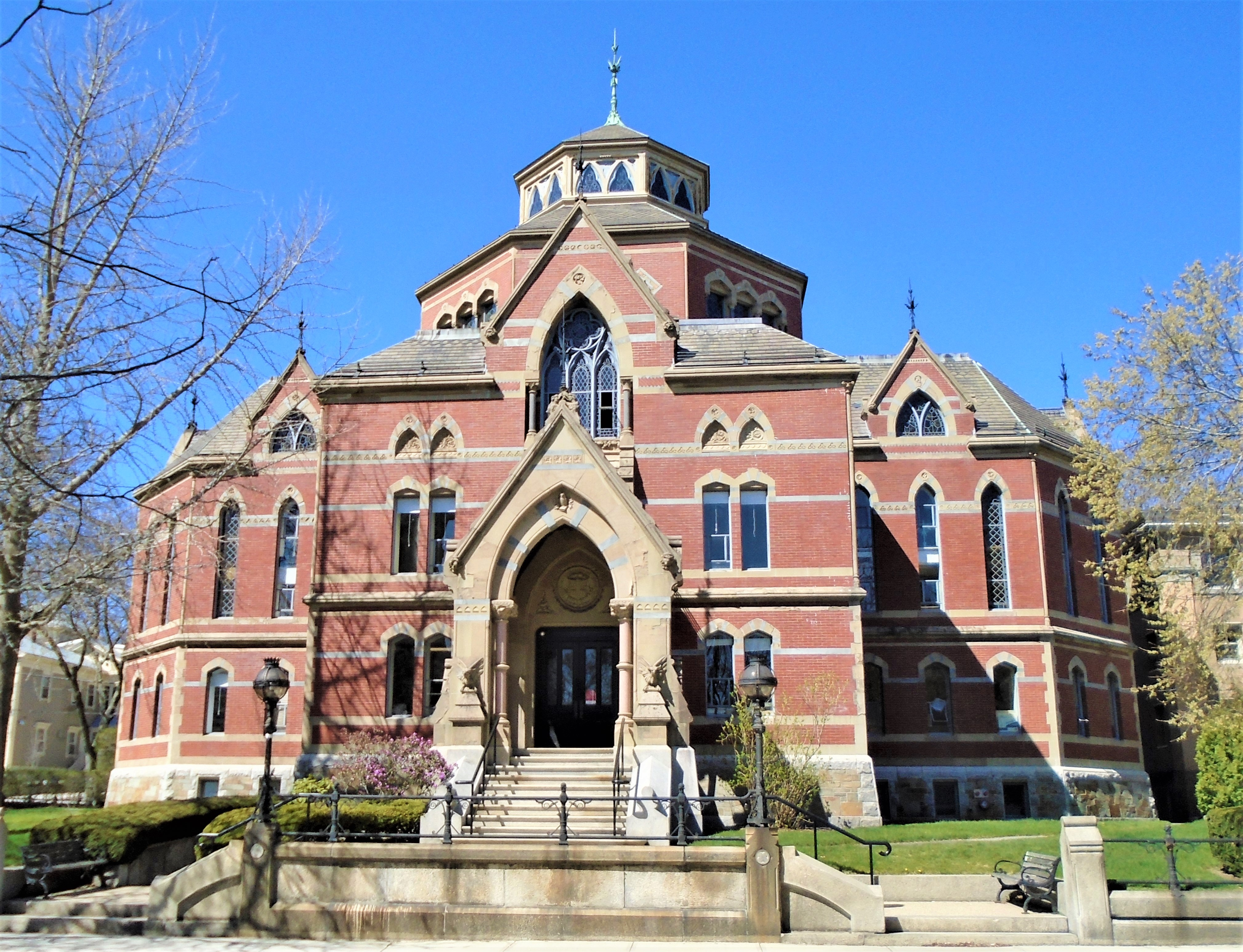
Robinson Hall of Brown University, designed by Walker & Gould in the High Victorian Gothic style and completed in 1878.

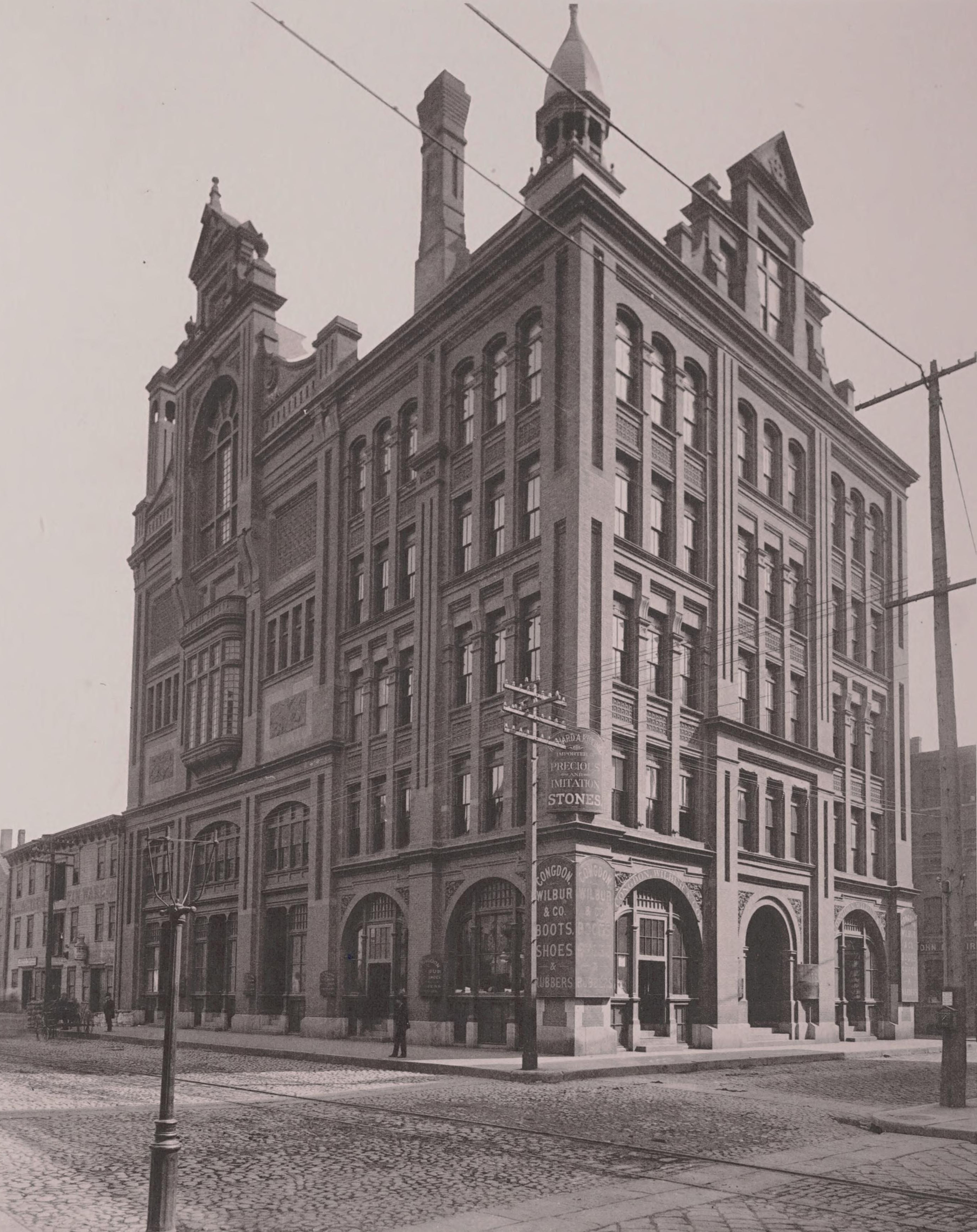
The former Masonic Temple in Providence, designed by Wm. R. Walker & Son in the Queen Anne style and completed in 1886.

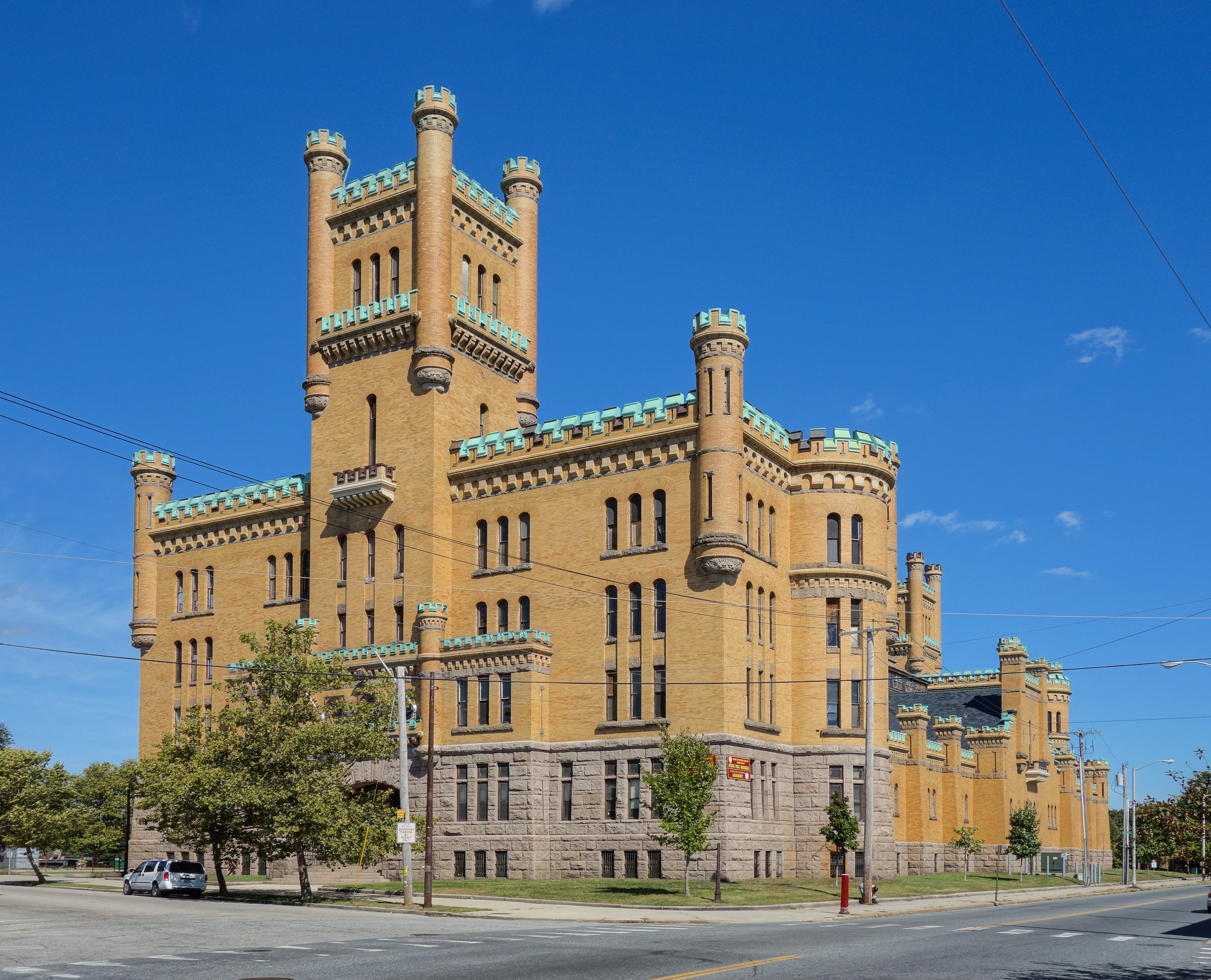
The Cranston Street Armory in Providence, designed by Wm. R. Walker & Son in a fortified Gothic Revival style and completed in 1907.

William Russell Walker (April 14, 1830 – March 11, 1905) was an American architect in practice in Providence, Rhode Island, from 1864 until his retirement in 1903. From 1881 he was the senior partner of William R. Walker & Son, and during his lifetime was the most prolific architect of public buildings in Rhode Island.

== Early life ==
Major-General William Russell Walker was born April 14, 1830, in a part of Seekonk, Massachusetts, that is now East Providence, Rhode Island, to Alfred Walker and Huldah Burdeen Walker, née Perry. Walker was a descendant of the "Widow Walker," one of the original purchasers and proprietors of Rehoboth in 1643. He was educated in the Seekonk public schools and graduated from the Seekonk Classical Seminary, a private school, in 1846. For the next three years he was apprenticed to a Providence carpenter and studied architectural drawing at Scholfield's Commercial College. During the winter of 1850–51 he lived in Augusta, Georgia, but the next summer he returned to Rhode Island and settled in Pawtucket, where he would live for the rest of his life.

In 1857 Walker joined both the Freemasons and the Pawtucket Light Guard of the Rhode Island state militia, two organizations would have a dominant role in his later architectural career. Walker was a member of the committee which built the guard's Armory Hall (1859) on High Street in Pawtucket, the first building with which he is associated. In April 1861, shortly after the outbreak of the American Civil War, the Pawtucket Light Guard was designated Company E of the 1st Rhode Island Infantry, which was raised by Ambrose Burnside. Walker was commissioned a first lieutenant of the company, which mustered out three months later in August.

== Architectural career ==
In February 1864 Walker established himself as an architect in the Merchants Bank Building in Providence. During his lifetime, he moved his offices first to the Reynolds Building and second to the Vaughan Building, neither of which are extant. During the next decade he was joined by several draftsmen: in 1868 by Thomas J. Gould, in 1872 by Frank W. Angell and in 1874 by his son, W. Howard Walker. He was a sole practitioner until January 1876, when he and Gould formed the partnership of Walker & Gould. This continued for five years until January 1881, when Gould and Angell withdrew to form their own firm and Walker and his son formed the new partnership of William R. Walker & Son.

Walker was closely associated with the Rhode Island state militia, Republican Party and masonic establishment. Through these connections, he designed most of the public buildings built in Rhode Island during his career, including town and city halls, state armories and public schools. His career culminated in the Cranston Street Armory (1907), begun in 1902 but not completed until two years after his death. Walker had retired from the firm in 1903 due to his declining health. This firm survived nearly forty years after his death: it was led successively by his son W. Howard Walker and grandson William R. Walker until their deaths in 1922 and 1936, respectively, and by his grandson's associates, George H. Rice and Roy F. Arnold, until its dissolution sometime during World War II.

== Personal life ==
Walker was a member of the Republican party. He was member of the North Providence town council as well as of that of Pawtucket when it separated from North Providence in 1874. He served two terms in the Rhode Island General Assembly and was a delegate to the 1888 Republican National Convention in Chicago, which nominated Benjamin Harrison for president. In the 1890s he served on the board of park commissioners of Pawtucket. It was substantially through his many political connections that Walker obtained so many public commissions throughout the state.

Walker was active in the state militia for over twenty years, retiring in 1879 with the rank of Major General. He was a member of the Military Order of the Loyal Legion and the Grand Army of the Republic. He was the architect of the state armories in Pawtucket (1895), Westerly (1901) and Providence (1907). His son was also prominent in the militia before his retirement in 1912. The construction of these armories in Rhode Island at the turn of the century followed a national trend, in which the rapidly expanding state National Guards were used increasingly as a disciplinary tool against organized labor. He filled at one time or another nearly all of the offices in the Rhode Island Freemasons. He was the architect of the Masonic Temples in Providence (1886) and Pawtucket (1898), neither of which are extant.

Walker was married in 1852 to Eliza Billings Hall of Providence. They had two children, George Clinton Walker and William Howard Walker. The first Mrs. Walker died in 1895 and Walker married second in 1897 to Mrs. Hannah Maria Gerald. Walker died March 11, 1905, at home in Pawtucket at the age of 74. He is buried in Swan Point Cemetery.

== Selected works ==
=== William R. Walker, 1864-1875 ===
- 1864 - Pawtucket Hair Cloth Mill, 501 Roosevelt Ave, Central Falls, Rhode Island
- 1865 - John A. Mitchell House, 190 Hope St, Providence, Rhode Island
- 1866 - Ogden Mills House (Ocean View), 662 Bellevue Ave, Newport, Rhode Island
- 1868 - Frederic C. Sayles House (Bryn Mawr), East Ave, Pawtucket, Rhode Island
  - Demolished
- 1868 - Benjamin B. Knight House, 155 Broad St, Providence, Rhode Island
  - Demolished
- 1870 - Amasa Sprague Jr. House, Valentine Circle, Warwick, Rhode Island
  - Burned in 1930
- 1870 - Isaac Davis House, 59 Elm St, Worcester, Massachusetts
- 1871 - Benedict House, 301 Main St, Pawtucket, Rhode Island
  - Demolished in 1979
- 1871 - Pawtucket City Hall (Old), 35 High St, Pawtucket, Rhode Island
  - Demolished in 1968
- 1871 - Wamsutta House, Elm & N Washington, North Attleborough, Massachusetts
  - Demolished
- 1872 - Equitable Building, 1 Custom House St, Providence, Rhode Island
- 1872 - Northbridge Memorial Town Hall, 7 Main St, Whitinsville, Massachusetts
- 1872 - Alfred A. Reed, Jr. House (Cedar Hill), 4157 Post Rd, Warwick, Rhode Island
- 1872 - John C. Whitin House, 60 Main St, Whitinsville, Massachusetts
  - Demolished in 1941
- 1873 - William Sprague House (Canonchet), Hoxsie Ln, Narragansett Pier, Rhode Island
  - Burned in 1909
- 1873 - Oakland Beach Hotel, Oakland Beach Ave, Oakland Beach, Rhode Island
  - Burned in 1903
- 1873 - Boston Store, 239 Westminster St, Providence, Rhode Island
  - Demolished
- 1875 - Bell Street Chapel, 5 Bell St, Providence, Rhode Island.

=== Walker & Gould, 1876-1880 ===
- 1876 - Central Falls Baptist Church, 481 Broad St, Central Falls, Rhode Island
  - Demolished
- 1876 - John E. Troup House, 478 Broadway, Providence, Rhode Island
- 1876 - Music Hall Block (Town Hall), 172 Main St, Danielson, Connecticut
- 1876 - Rhode Island Building, Centennial Exposition, Philadelphia, Pennsylvania
  - Demolished
- 1876 - Robinson Hall, Brown University, Providence, Rhode Island (dedicated February 16, 1878).
- 1876 - Woonsocket High School (Old), 60 High School St, Woonsocket, Rhode Island
  - Demolished in 2001
- 1877 - Aldrich Building, Delta St, Providence, Rhode Island. Demolished
  - Demolished
- 1877 - Daniels Building, 26 Custom House St, Providence, Rhode Island
  - Demolished
- 1877 - Charles R. Chapman House, 61 Woodland St, Hartford, Connecticut
  - Demolished
- 1877 - Horatio N. Campbell House, 141 Waterman St, Providence, Rhode Island
- 1877 - Providence High School (Old), Pond & Summer, Providence, Rhode Island
  - Demolished
- 1877 - Union Congregational Church, Broad St, Providence, Rhode Island
  - Demolished
- 1878 - Henry B. Metcalf House, 145 Broadway, Pawtucket, Rhode Island
  - Demolished
- 1878 - Sanford C. Hovey House, 173 Congdon St, Providence, Rhode Island
- 1878 - Narragansett Hotel, 93 Dorrance St, Providence, Rhode Island
  - Demolished in 1959
- 1878 - Vaughan Building, 17 Custom House St, Providence, Rhode Island
  - Demolished
- 1879 - District 4 School, 132 Roger Williams Ave, Phillipsdale, Rhode Island
- 1879 - First Baptist Church, 1400 Pawtucket Ave, East Providence, Rhode Island
- 1880 - Charles P. Young House, 107 N Washington St, North Attleborough, Massachusetts
- 1880 - Everett P. Carpenter House, 72 Summit St, Pawtucket, Rhode Island
- 1880 - Nicholson File Office Building, 23 Acorn St, Providence, Rhode Island
- 1880 - Turner Avenue School, Turner & Smith, Riverside, Rhode Island
  - Demolished

== Gallery ==
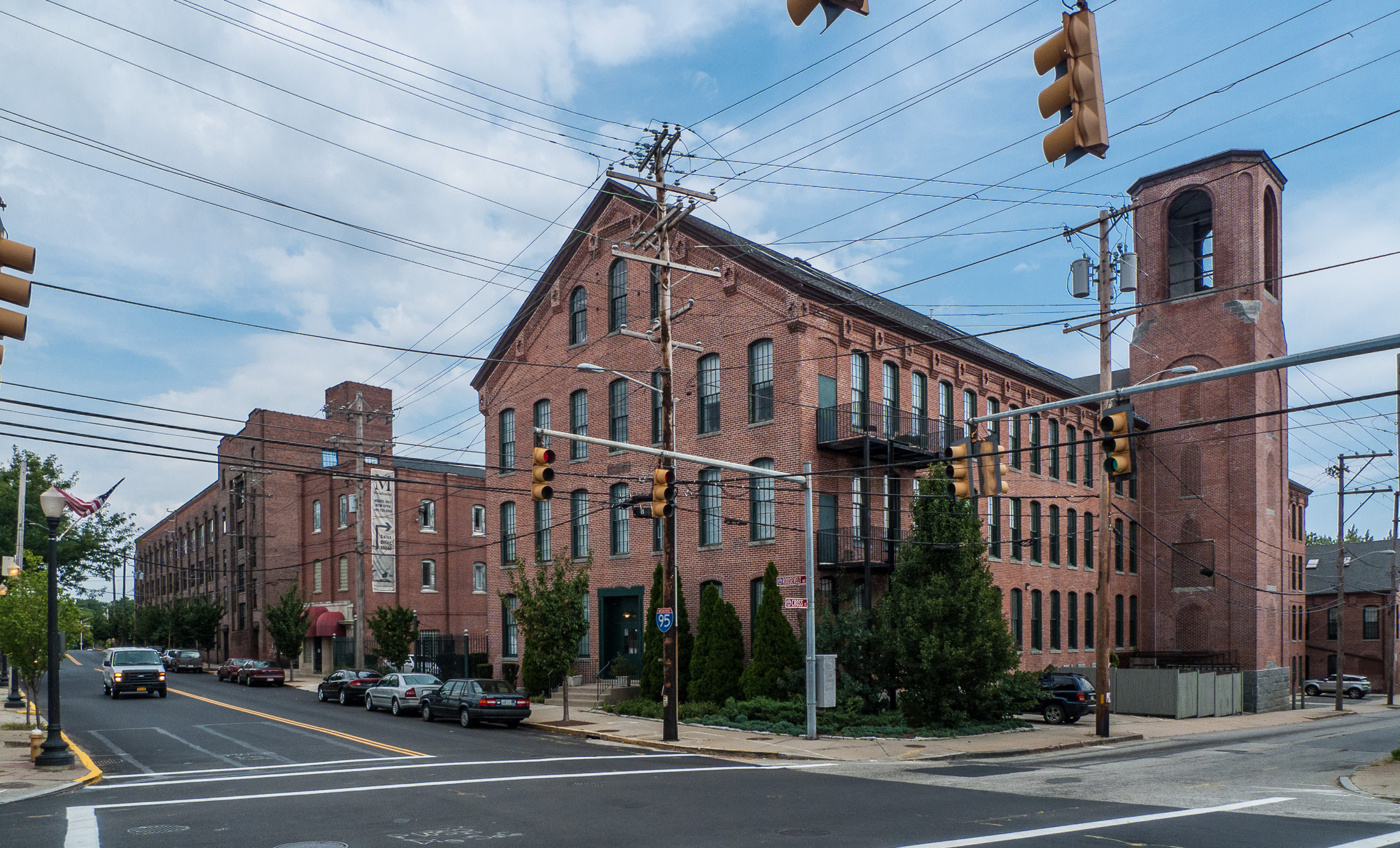
Pawtucket Hair Cloth Mill, Central Falls. 1864.

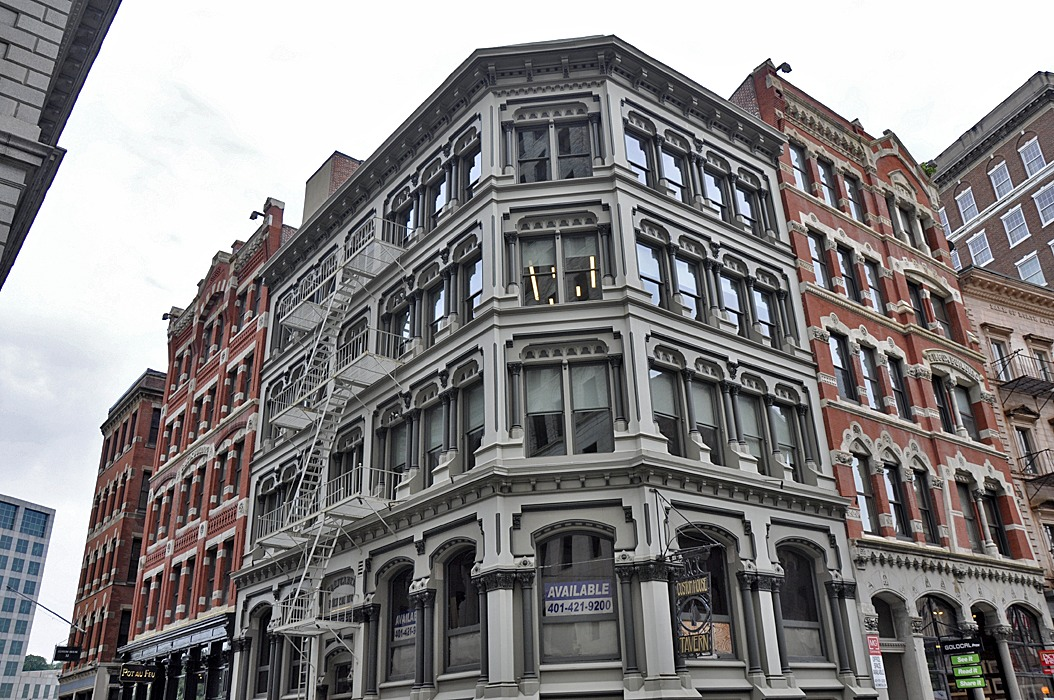
Equitable Building, Providence. 1872.

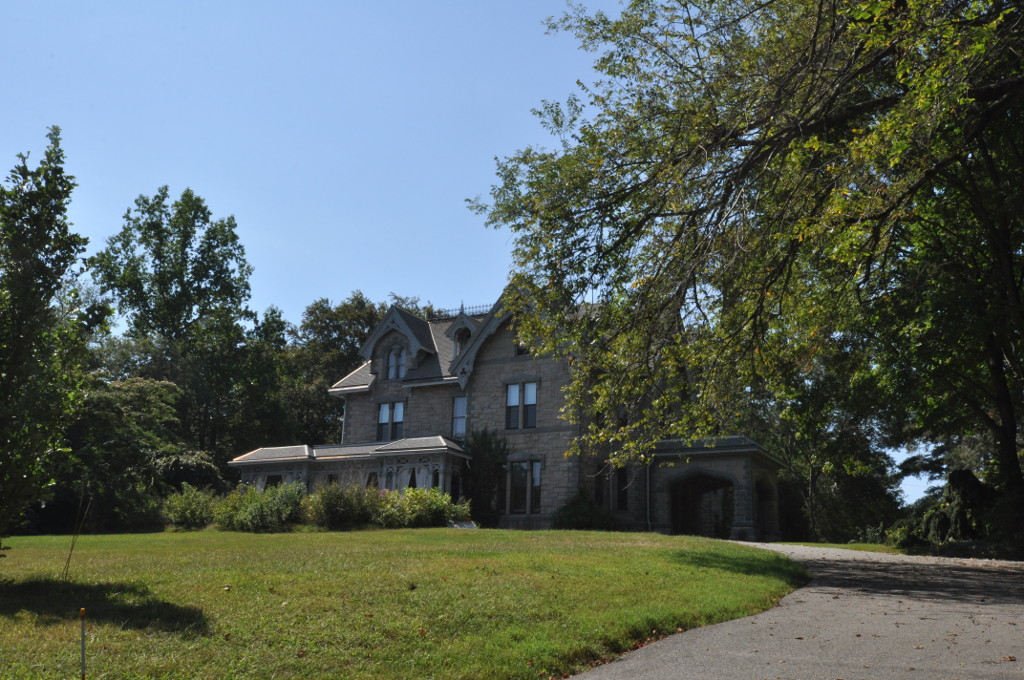
Cedar Hill, Warwick. 1872.

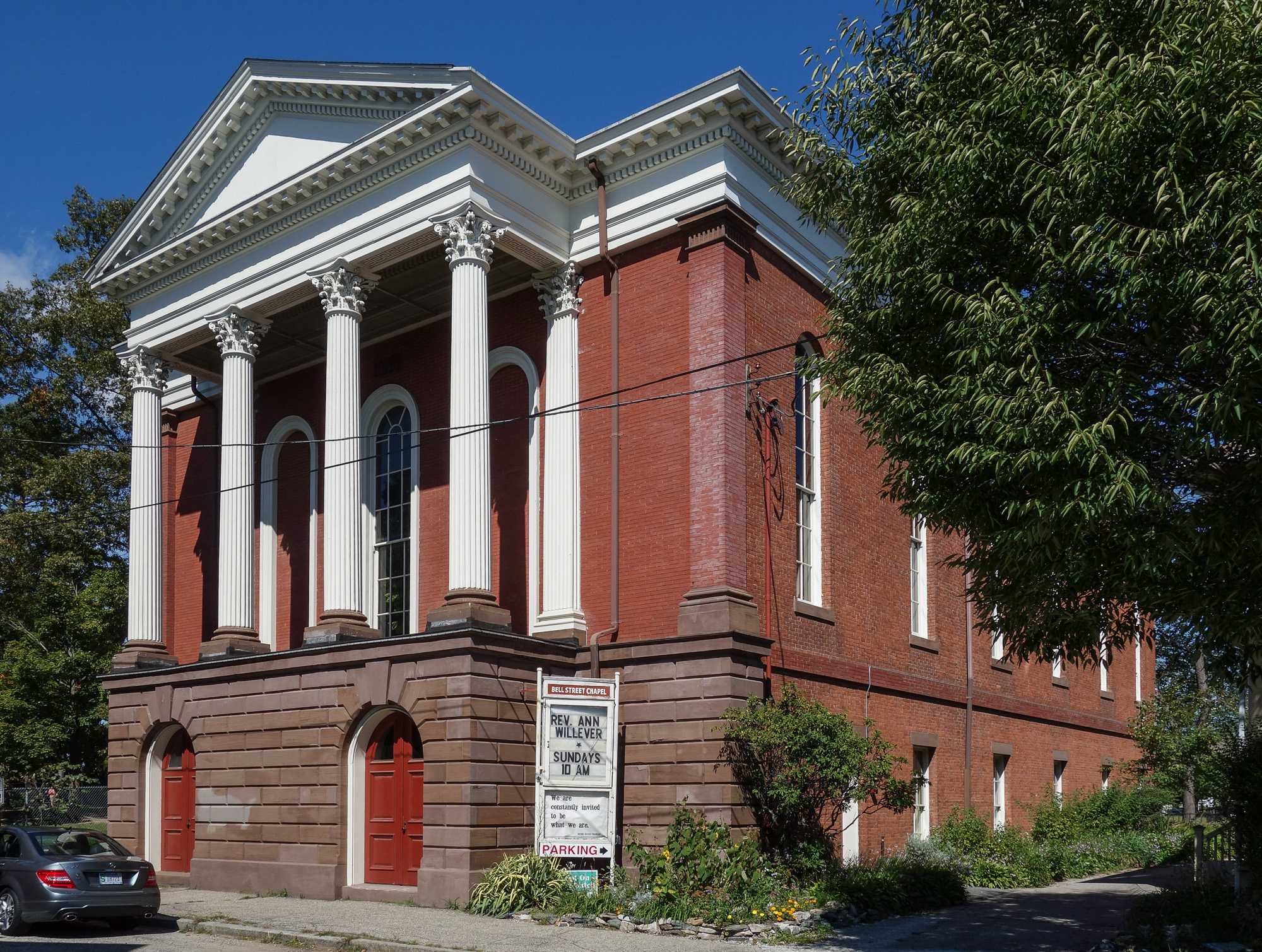
Bell Street Chapel, Providence. 1875.

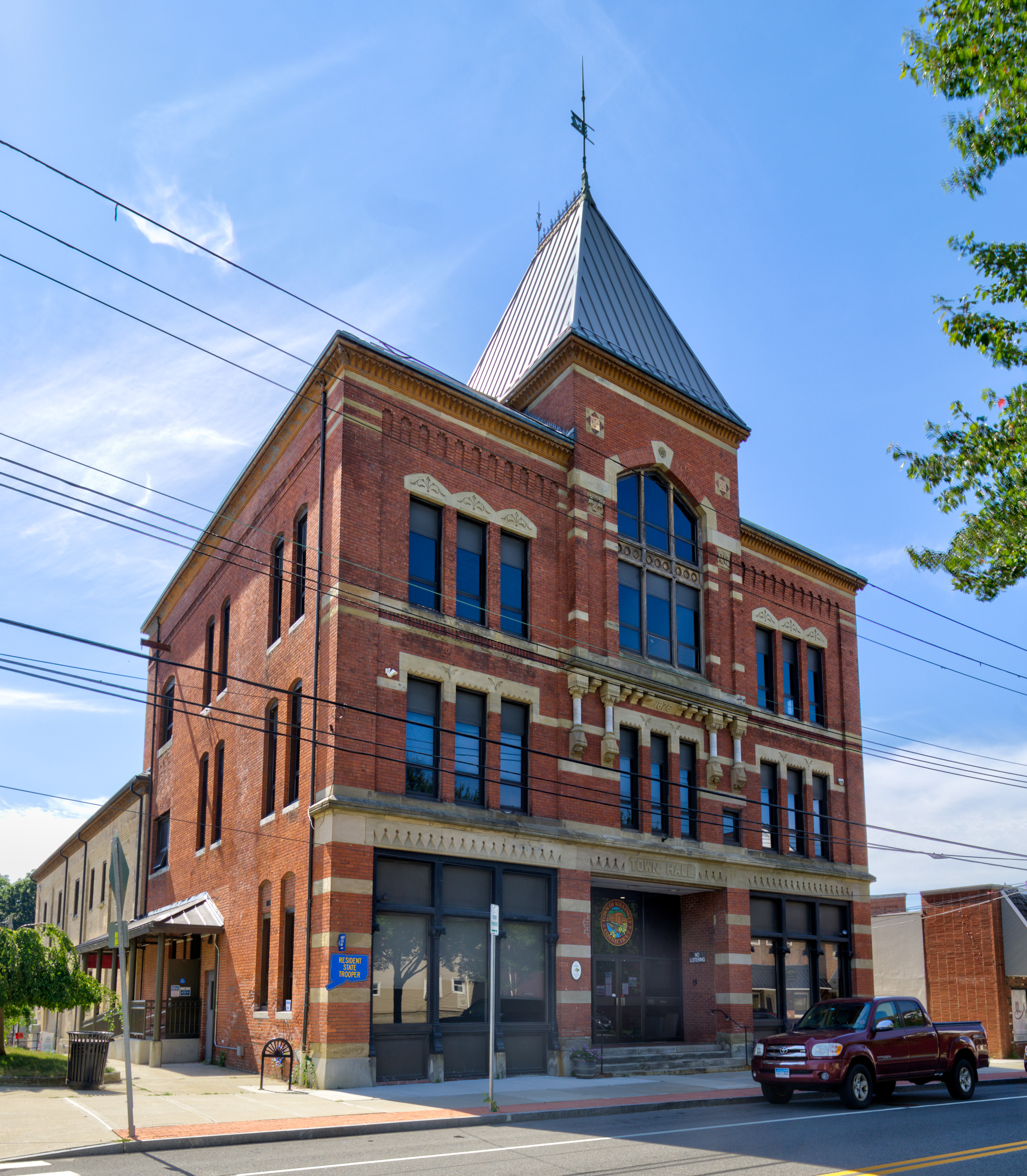
Music Hall, Danielson, Connecticut. 1876.

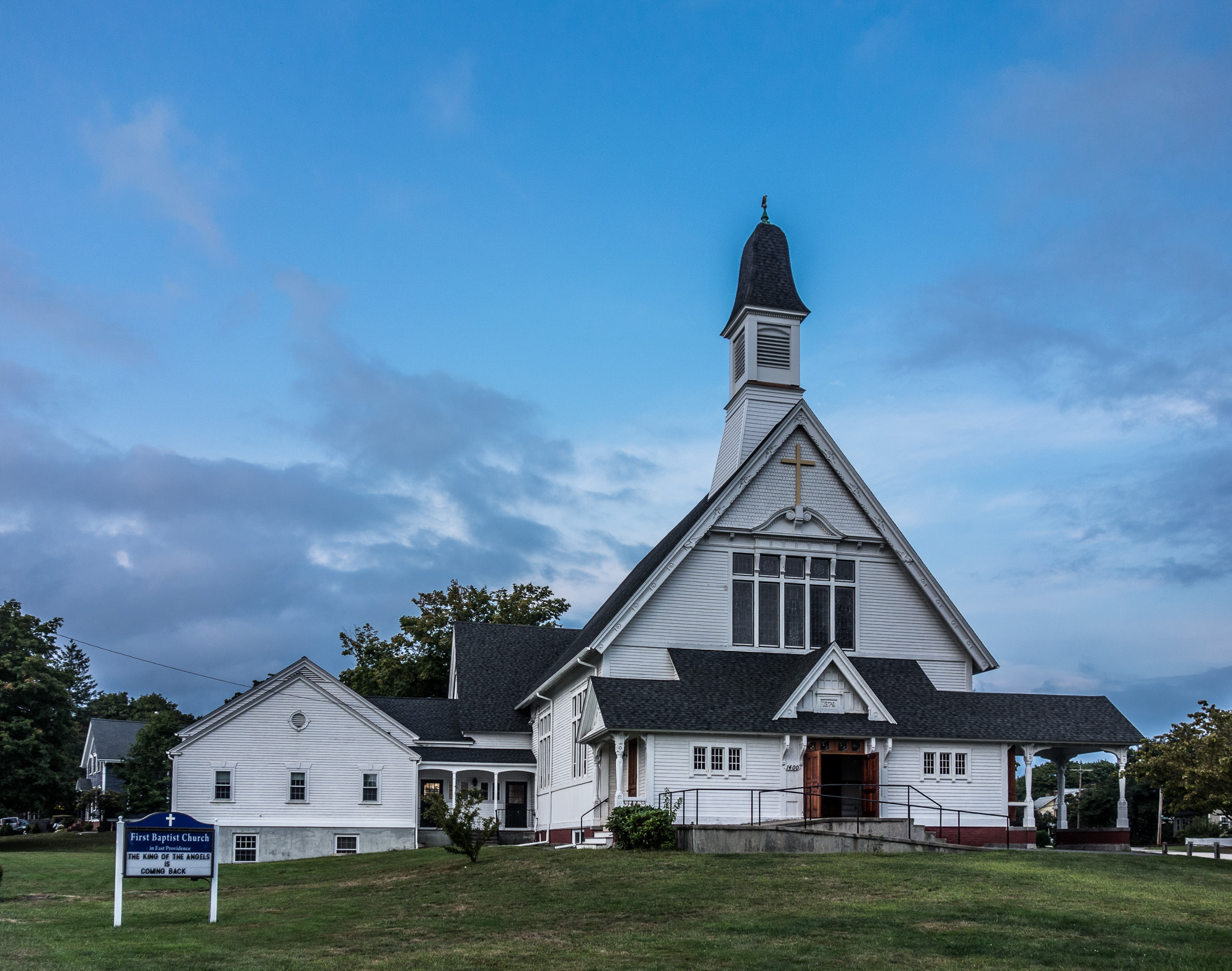
First Baptist Church, East Providence. 1879.

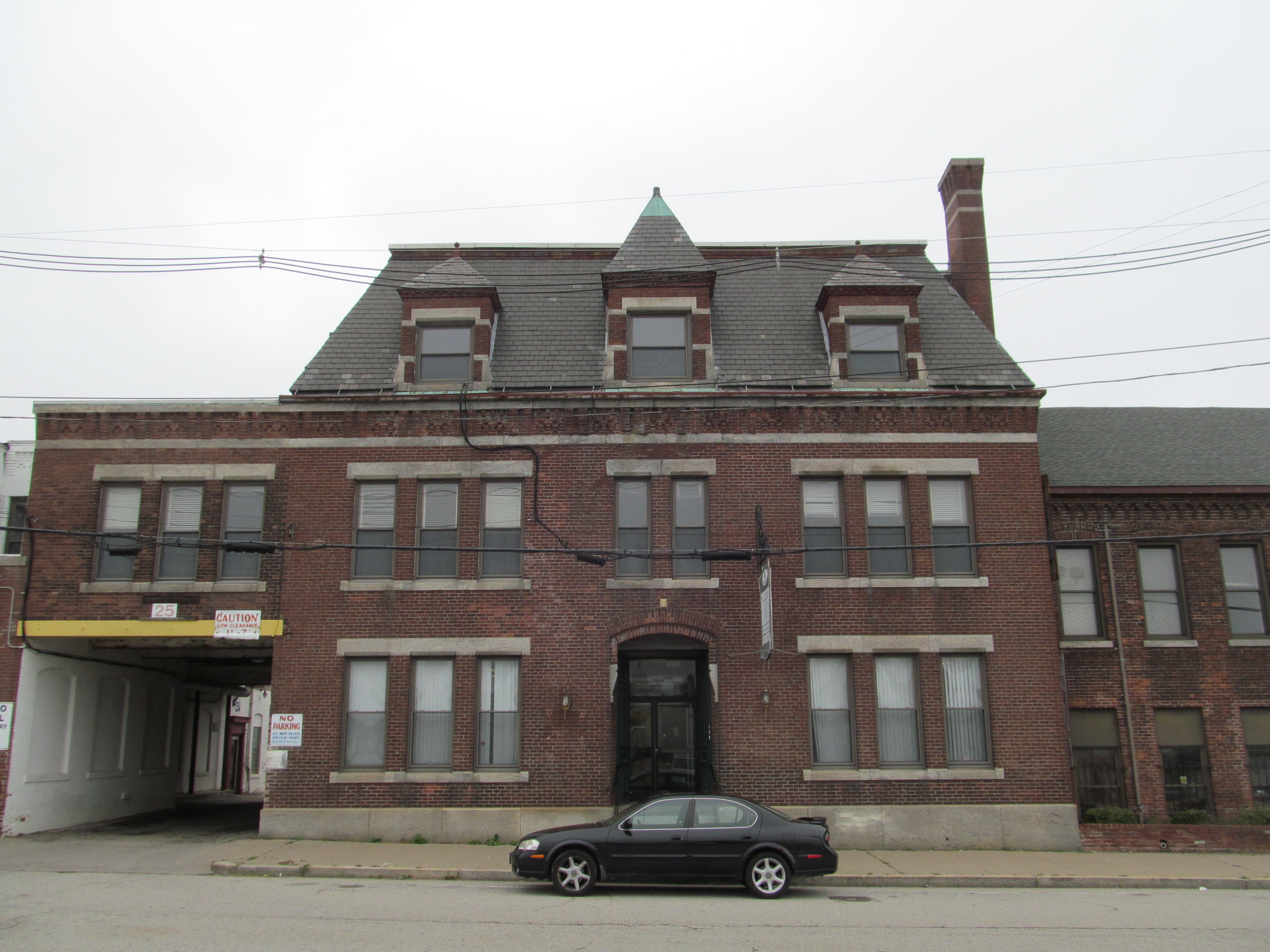
Nicholson File Office Building, Providence. 1880.
