= Governor Henry Lippitt House =

Historic house in Rhode Island, United States

- U.S. National Register of Historic Places
- U.S. National Historic Landmark
- U.S. Historic district – Contributing property
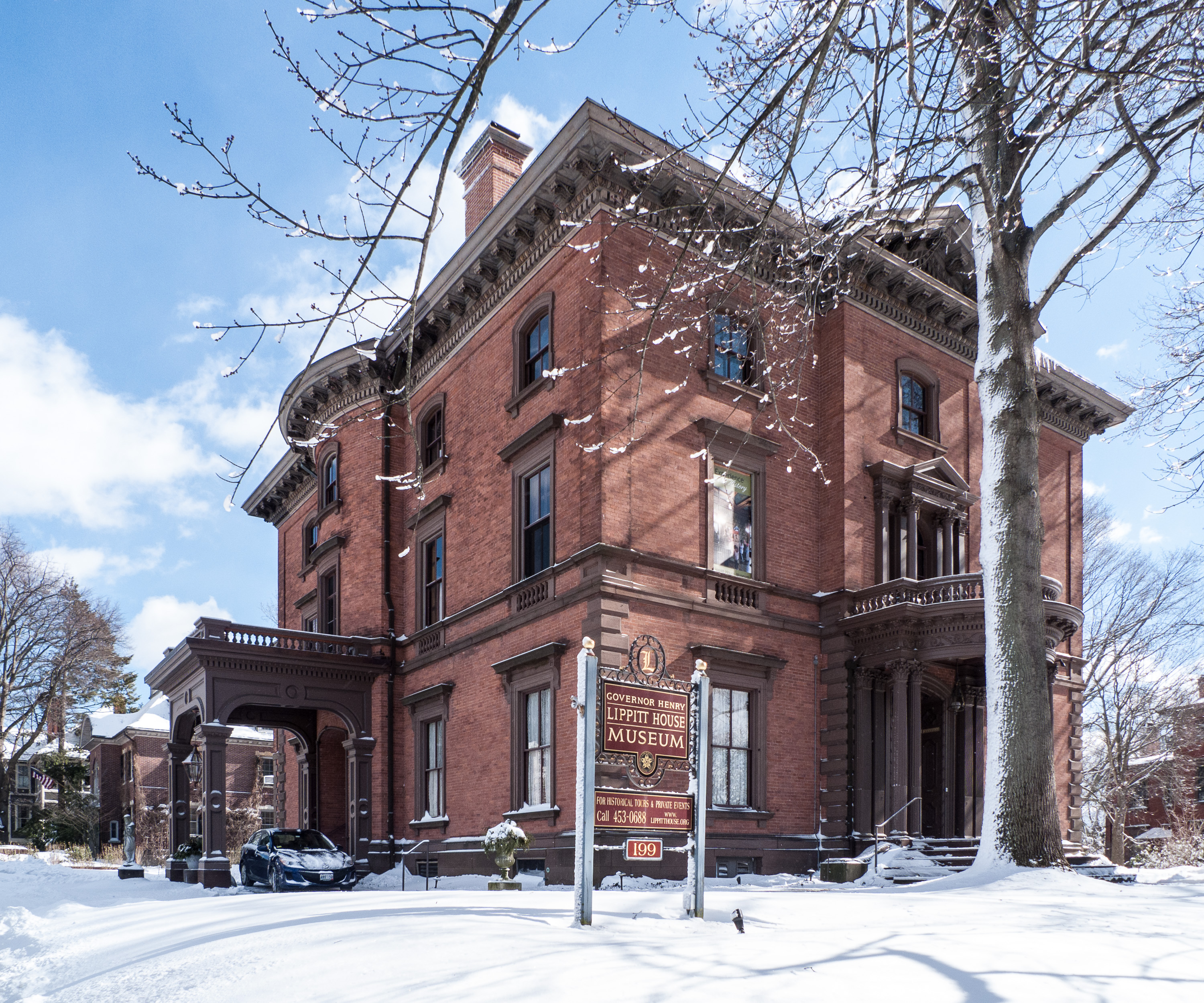
- The house grounds blanketed in snow.

- Location within Rhode Island Location within the United States
- Location: Providence, Rhode Island
- Coordinates: 41°49′41″N 71°23′52″W
- Built: 1862
- Architect: Childs, Henry
- Architectural style: Italianate
- Part of: Hope-Power-Cooke Streets Historic District (ID73000070)
- NRHP reference No.: 72000043

Significant dates
- Added to NRHP: November 27, 1972
- Designated NHL: May 11, 1976
- Designated CP: January 12, 1973

The Governor Henry Lippitt House is a historic house museum at 199 Hope Street on the East Side of Providence, Rhode Island. A National Historic Landmark, it is one of the finest Italianate mansion houses in the state, and considered one of the best-preserved examples of Victorian-era houses in the United States. It is notable for its association with Henry Lippitt (1818–91), a wealthy textile magnate who was the 33rd Governor of Rhode Island. The house is owned by Preserve Rhode Island, and is open to the public for tours seasonally or by appointment.

== Description ==
The Lippitt House is a large three-story brick structure, resting on a brownstone foundation, and topped by a roof that is hipped except for a projecting gable at the front (western) elevation. A two-story wing projects to the rear (east) of the house. The corners of the building are quoined in brownstone, and there are brownstone belt courses between the first and second floors. The main entry is sheltered by a semicircular porch supported by fluted and cabled Corinthian columns. The porch has an elaborately decorated roof line, as does the main roof and the porte-cochère on the north side.

The interior is well-preserved. The public rooms exhibit a wide variety of materials and are decorated with original wallpaper, woodwork, plasterwork, and stenciling. Original gas lighting fixtures are still present, but have been converted to electricity. Stained glass windows adorn the stair landings.

The house is part of a group of mansion homes built along Hope Street by wealthy Providence businessmen and politicians, which are now a part of the Hope-Power-Cooke Streets Historic District.

== History ==
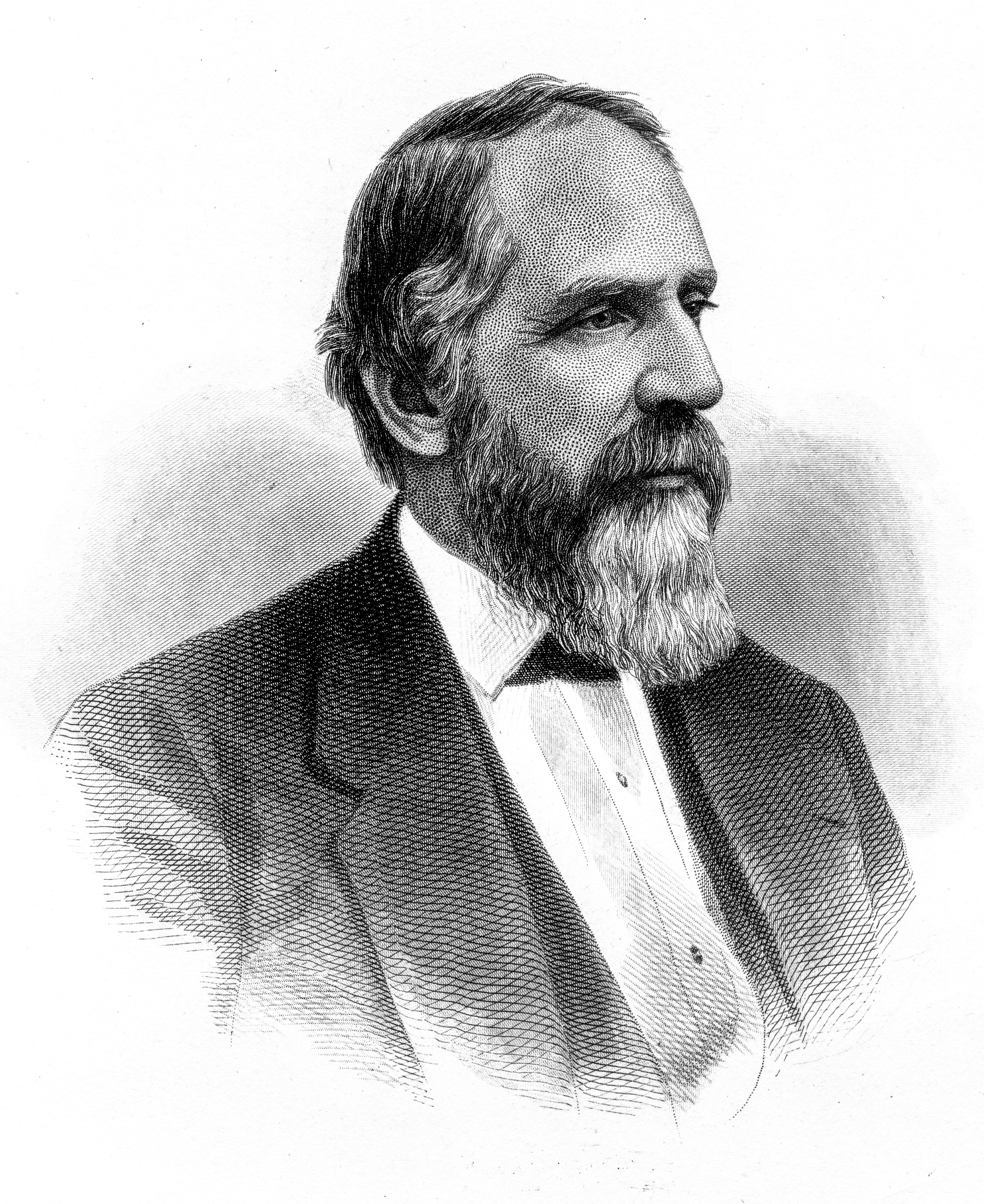
Henry Lippitt

The house was built in 1865 by Governor Henry Lippitt and was loosely based upon a design by Russell Warren. Lippitt descendants lived in the house until the 1970s.

The house was listed on the National Register of Historic Places in 1972, and designated a National Historic Landmark in 1976. In 1981, the Lippitt family donated it to Preserve Rhode Island, which maintains the house as a Victorian period historic house museum.

To commemorate the 150th anniversary of Lippitt House, the museum held a series of exhibits and events in 2015. The first of these was an outdoor exhibit of six brushed aluminum sculptures by artist Aaron Pexa. The sculptures, viewable on the front lawn of the mansion, were colorful silhouettes which represent domestic workers who worked for Henry Lippitt.

== Gallery ==
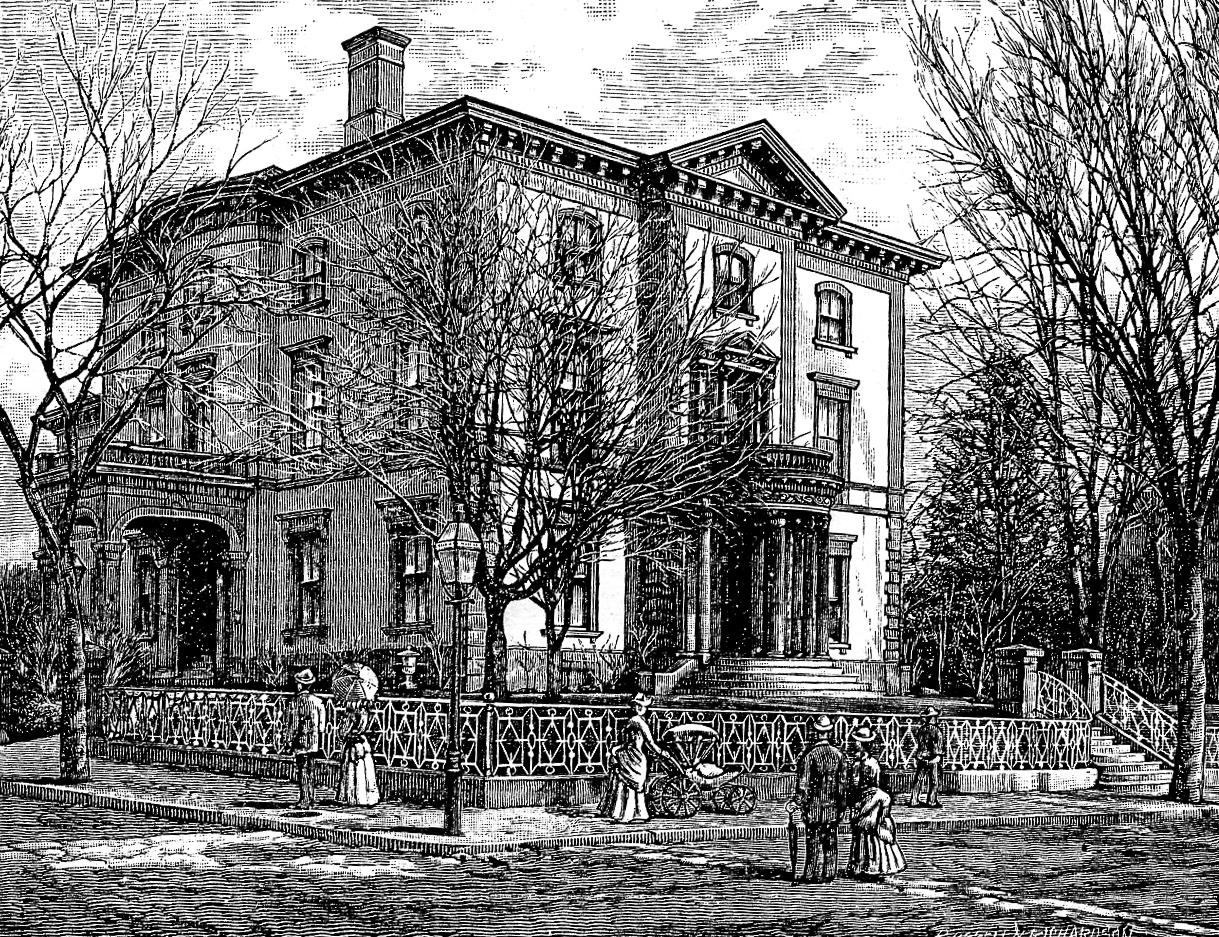
1886 engraving

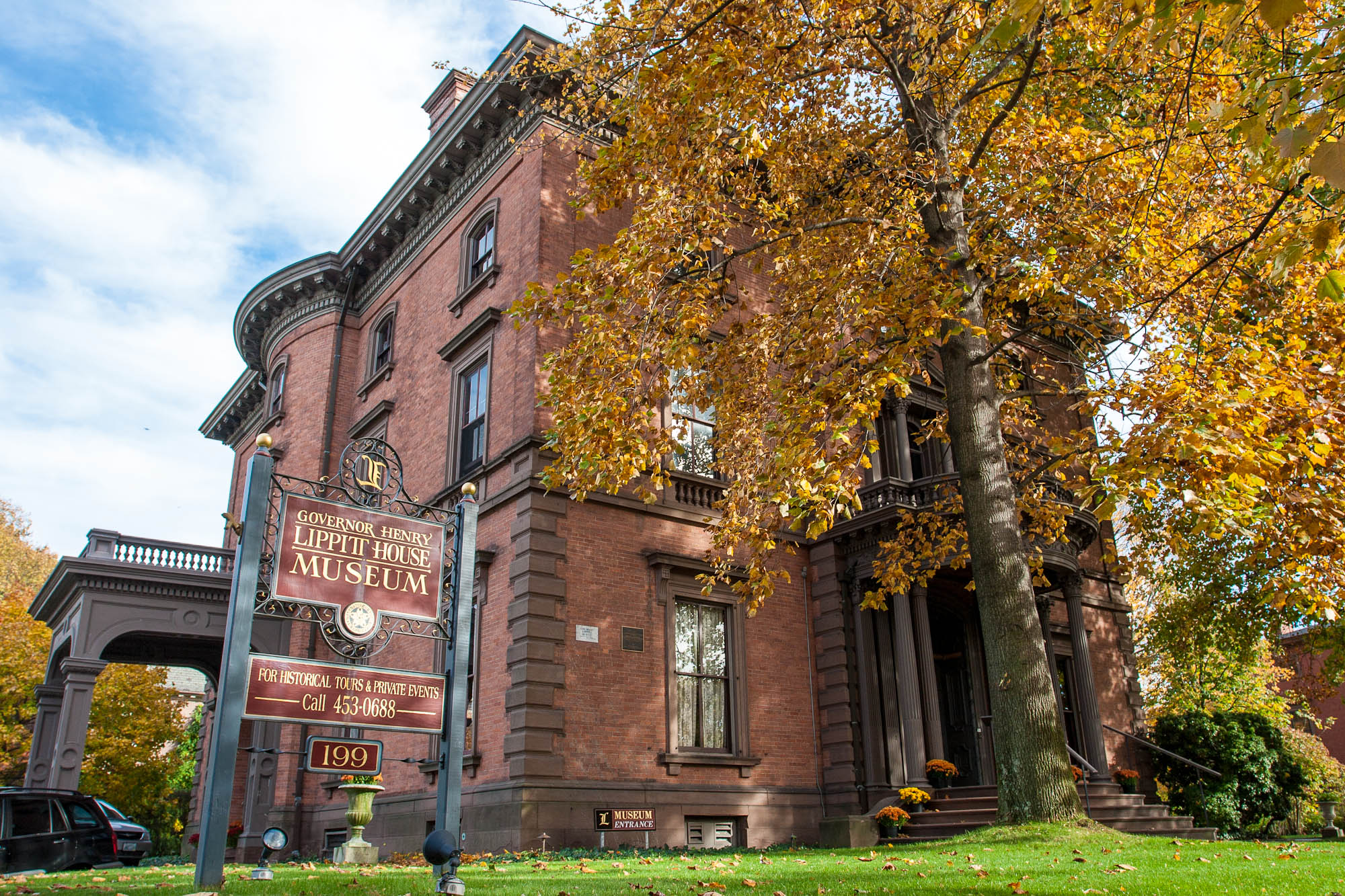
Autumn 2005

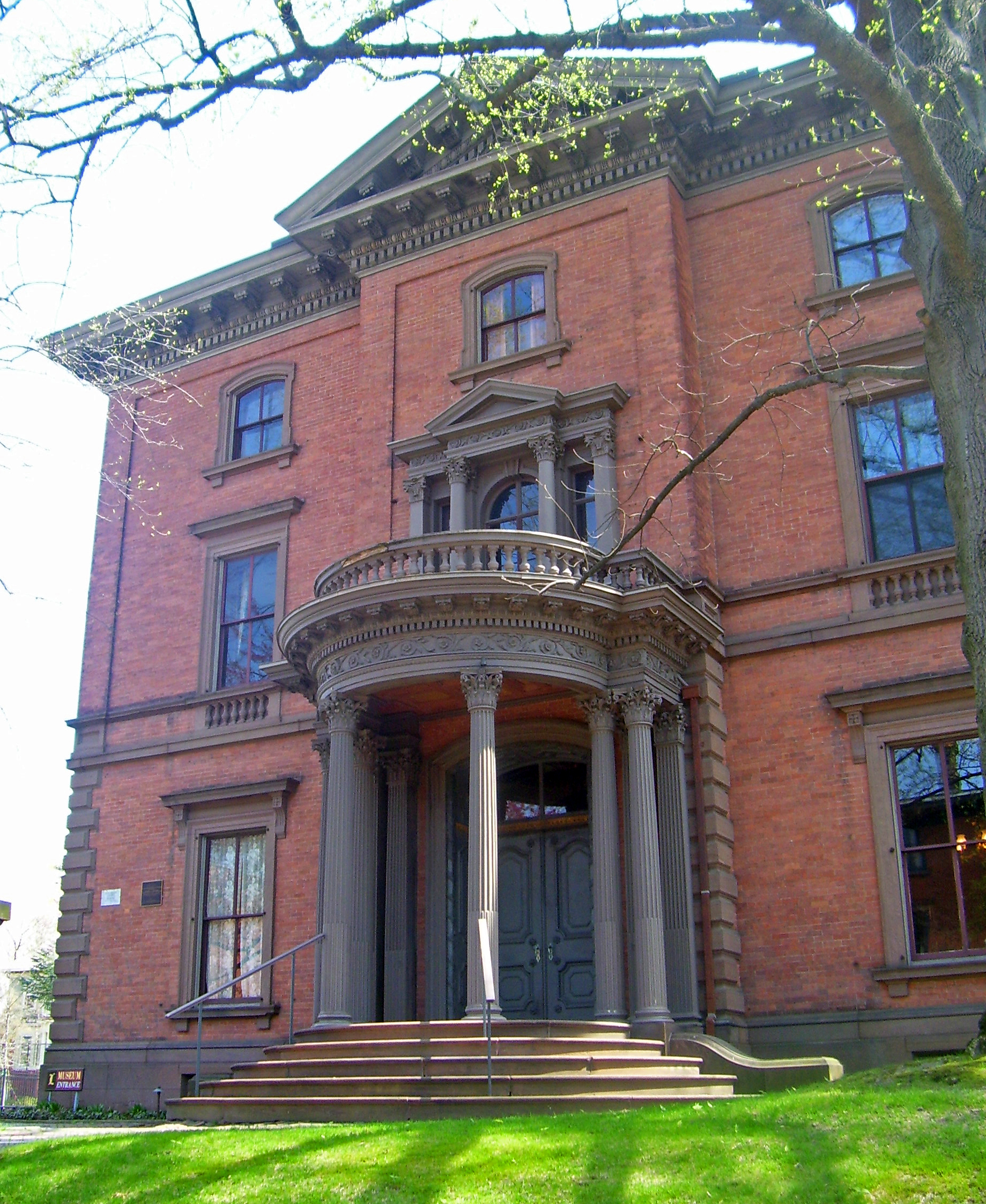
Front elevation of house in 2008

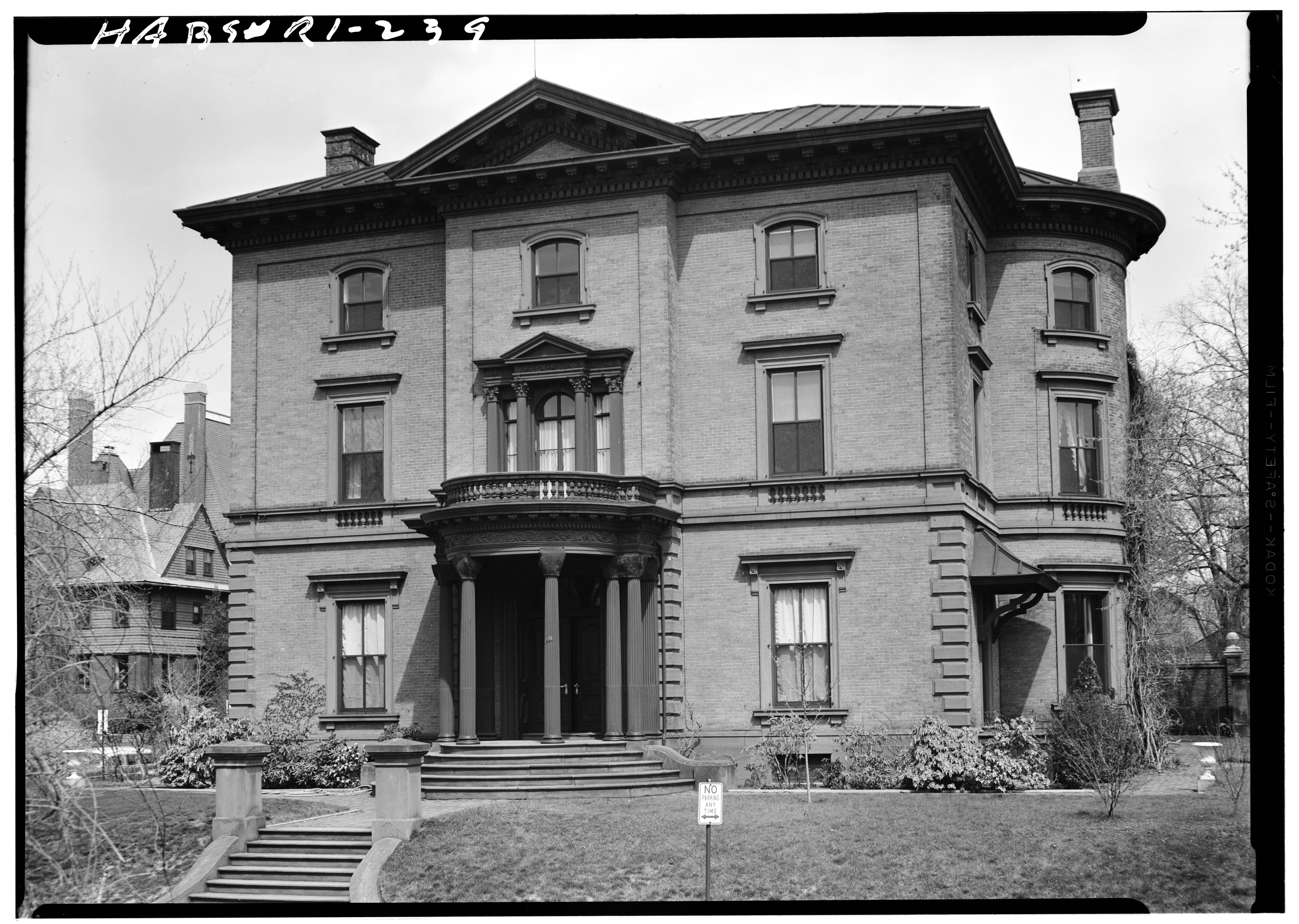

== See also ==
- List of National Historic Landmarks in Rhode Island
- National Register of Historic Places listings in Providence, Rhode Island
