= Clouds Hill (Warwick, Rhode Island) =

Historic house in Rhode Island, United States

- Cedar Hill
- U.S. National Register of Historic Places
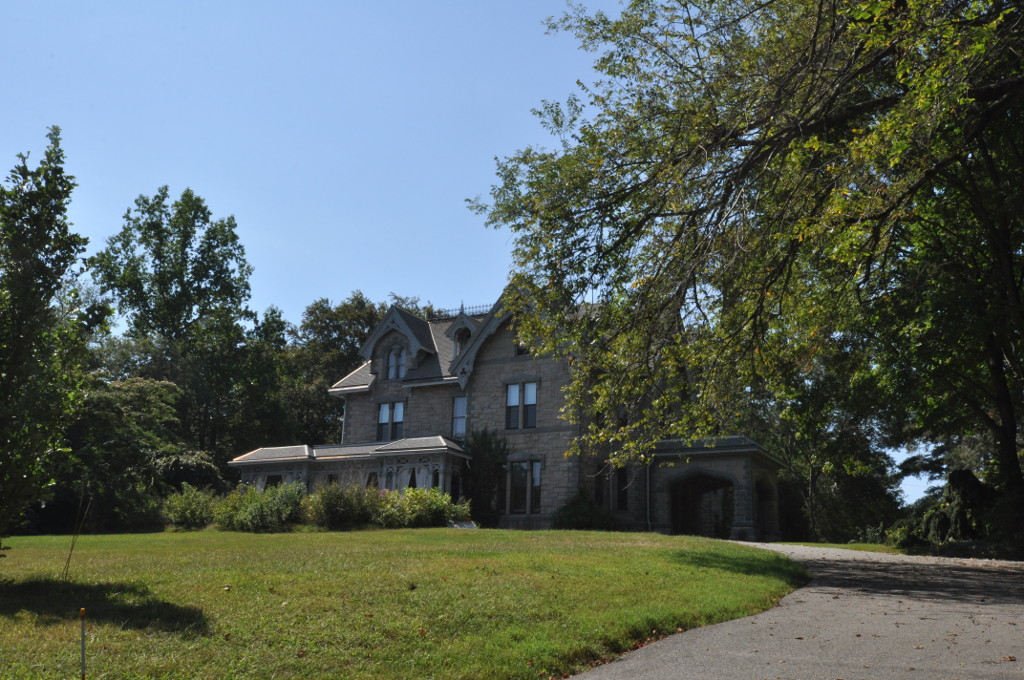

- Location within Rhode Island Location within the United States
- Location: 4157 Post Road, Warwick, Rhode Island
- Coordinates: 41.67841°N 71.45295°W
- Area: 27.4 acres (11.1 ha)
- Built: 1877
- Architect: William R. Walker
- Architectural style: Gothic Revival
- NRHP reference No.: 14001077
- Added to NRHP: December 22, 2014

Clouds Hill is a historic house museum located at 4157 Post Road in Warwick, Rhode Island. Its stand on the estate formerly known as Cedar Hill, a country estate built 1871-77 as a wedding present for Elizabeth Ives Slater Reed by her father, William S. Slater. The main mansion, designed by noted Providence architect William R. Walker, is a large Gothic Revival structure and one of his few surviving large-scale residential designs. The Slaters and Reeds, prominent industrial textile magnates in Rhode Island, adorned the property with high quality Victorian-era workmanship, including a distinctive Egyptian-themed room. The estate, occupied by four generations of Reed descendants, was converted to a museum in 2004 and was listed on the National Register of Historic Places in 2014. The Clouds Hill Victorian House Museum is open by appointment, or when events are scheduled.

== See also ==
- List of museums in Rhode Island
- National Register of Historic Places listings in Kent County, Rhode Island
