= Nicholson File Company Mill Complex =

- U.S. National Register of Historic Places
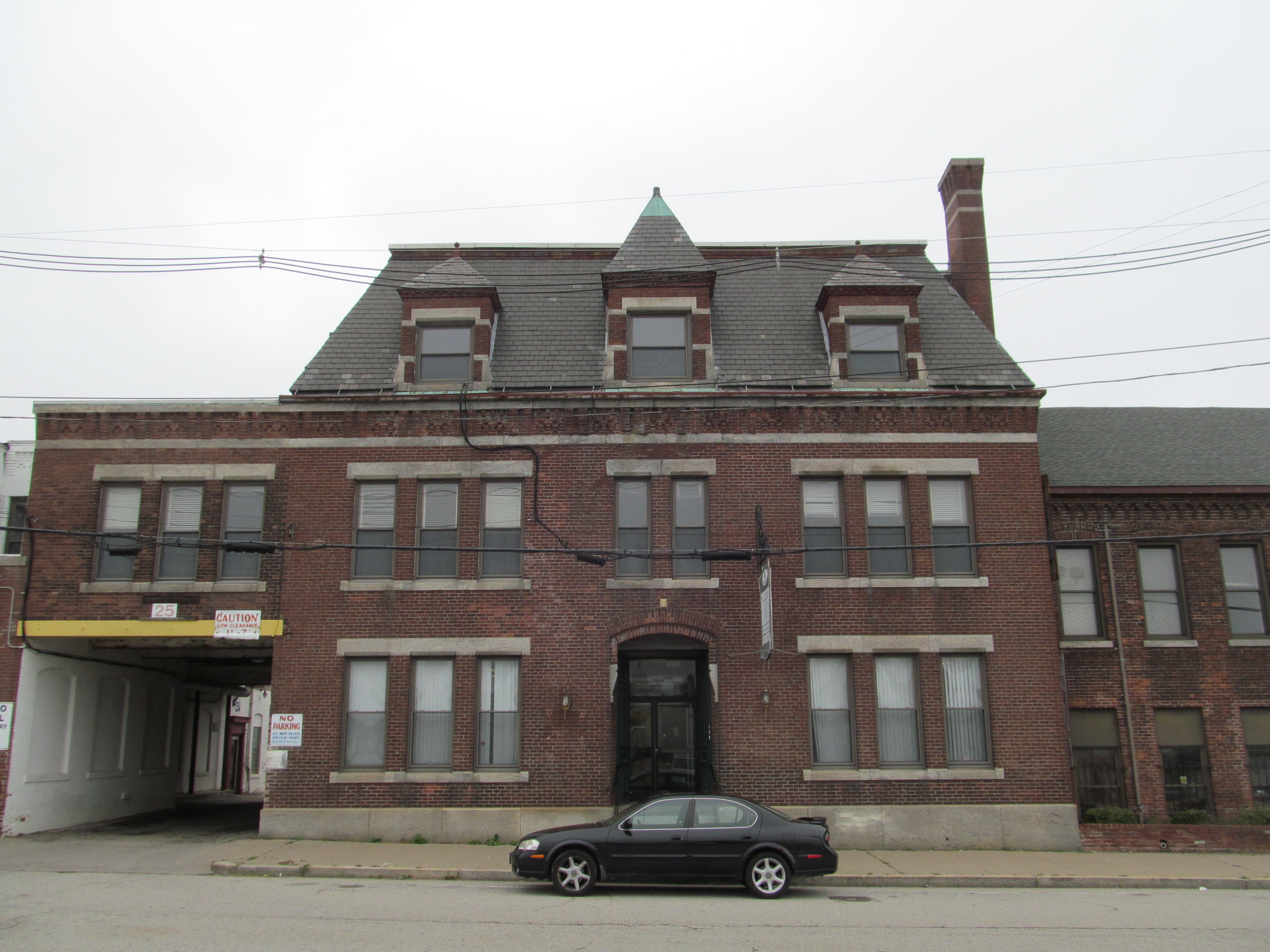
- Nicholson File Company Mill

- Location within Rhode Island Location within the United States
- Location: Providence, Rhode Island
- Coordinates: 41°49′39″N 71°25′47″W
- Area: 7 acres (2.8 ha)
- Built: 1864
- Architect: William T. Nicholson; Walker & Gould
- NRHP reference No.: 05000918
- Added to NRHP: August 22, 2005

The Nicholson File Company Mill Complex is a historic industrial manufacturing complex at 1-45 Acorn Street in Providence, Rhode Island. It consists of 24 buildings occupying 7 acres (2.8 ha) of land, of which 20 are historically significant. The oldest of the buildings were built in 1865 to designs by William Nicholson, and the complex was regularly expanded over the decades through the early 20th century. The Nicholson File Company was a major producer of machine-made files, started by William Nicholson in 1859. The company manufactured precision tools used in the manufacture of armaments during the American Civil War for the Union Army, and closed the plant in 1959. It has been used by a variety of light industrial concerns since then.

The complex was listed on the National Register of Historic Places in 2005.

== See also ==
- National Register of Historic Places listings in Providence, Rhode Island
