= Anna Garlin Spencer =

American educator, feminist, and Unitarian minister

Rev. Anna Garlin Spencer (1894)

Anna Garlin Spencer (April 17, 1851 – 12 February 1931) was an American educator, feminist, and Unitarian minister. Born in Attleboro, MA, she married the Rev. William H. Spencer in 1878. She was a leader in the women's suffrage and peace movements. In 1891 she became the first woman ordained as a minister in the state of Rhode Island. In Providence she was commissioned to develop the Religious Society of Bell Street Chapel which was to be devoted to the religious outlook of James Eddy. She compiled Eddy's views into a Bond of Union to which members of the new society would subscribe. She was later associated with the New York Society for Ethical Culture (1903–1909) and the New York School of Philanthropy (1903–1913).In 1909, she signed on to the call to found the National Association for the Advancement of Colored People. Over a long period she was a popular lecturer and wrote on social problems, especially concerning women and family relations. Her writings include Woman's Share in Social Culture (1913) and The Family and Its Members (1922).

== Biography ==
Anna Garlin Spencer was born on April 17, 1851, in Attleboro, Massachusetts. At the age of eighteen, she began to write for the Providence Journal. In 1878, Anna Garlin Spencer married Reverend William Spencer. After twelve years of marriage, Rev. Spencer became an invalid. In 1891, she became the first woman minister of RI at Bell Street Chapel of Providence, RI. In 1893, she spoke at the World Parliament of Religion during the Chicago World's Fair. In 1903, she became an associate leader of the NY Society for Ethical Culture.

She was an associate director of the NY school for social work and staff lecturer at the NY school of Philanthropy. From 1908 to 1911, she was a special lecturer at the University of Wisconsin and director of the Summer School of Ethics for the American Ethical Union. From 1901 to 1911, she also lectured at the Institute of Municipal and Social Services in Milwaukee. In 1913, she was a professor of sociology and ethic at the Meadville Theological School.

In 1919, she moved to New York. From this time on, she gave numerous lectures at Teachers College of Columbia University. She still remained active in a number of organizations that included many interests, such as women's rights, social work, and religious education. Spencer died of heart failure on 12 February 1931 in New York City, at a dinner for the League of Nations, which she had worked for many years to help establish.

=== Author ===
Spencer's book Women's Share in Social Culture was published in 1913, and noted women's lack of equality at this time. She pressed the need for gender equality, especially as women were no longer shut up at home but were starting to become a part of the public society that once belonged exclusively to men. By promoting the "individuation of women," Spencer hoped to give insight into the lack of rights women had.

The Family and Its Members, published in 1922, this book shows the importance of the family and its foundation. This publication was based on three ideas: that the family institution should be preserved, that it should be modified to adapt to the changes in modern society, and noting the change in family order. According to the book, one huge impact on the family institution is society, which wants to control the family structure and influence the family to "conform" to social norms. Women are no longer silent in society; they are now recognized and play a role. Democracy once relied heavily on the strong educational upbringing of children (once the women's role). Now that women's roles have changed, women and their families have to find a new balance to still have a strong child upbringing. This solid upbringing will lead to a more beneficial society. Spencer hopes that society will move towards gender equality and decrease its influence over the family structure. Throughout this book, Spencer suggests ways the family can be more democratic and be strengthened by this new role for women.

== Style and themes ==
Spencer wrote many scholarly books about women, especially with regard to women's work and positions.

For instance, she explains that girls only work a few years, from when they are old enough to hold a job until marriage. With the brief work experience, women are not taking advantage of education. Because women know they are only going to spend a brief period in the workforce, they settle for low-paying jobs and poor working conditions. She believes receiving an education only to stop working and stop using this education after marriage is a waste of the education.

She advocates that women return to work part-time after child-bearing. She also acknowledges women's right to independence.

== Selected works ==
- "The Legal Position of Married Women", Popular Science Monthly, Volume 18, March 1881 at Wikisource
- "Advantages and Dangers of Organization".hosted at A Celebration of Women Writers, originally published pp 170 –177 in The Congress of women: held in the Woman's Building, World's Columbian Exposition, Chicago, U.S.A., 1893, with portraits, biographies and addresses Mary Kavanaugh Oldham (ed.), Monarch Book Company. 1894 [at Internet Archive]
- "Bell Street Chapel Discourses" [with selections from James Eddy], Printed by Journal of Commerce Co., Providence, (1899) at Internet Archive
- Problems of Marriage and Divorce, International Journal of Ethics, Vol. 19, No. 4 (Jul., 1909), pp. 443–465 - At JSTOR
- Women's Share in Social Culture. Press of J. J. Little & Sf Ives Company (1912) -At Internet Archive
- The Family And Its Members 1923, J.B. Lippincott Company, (1923). At Project Gutenberg
