= Isaac Davis House =

Historic house in Massachusetts, United States

- U.S. National Register of Historic Places
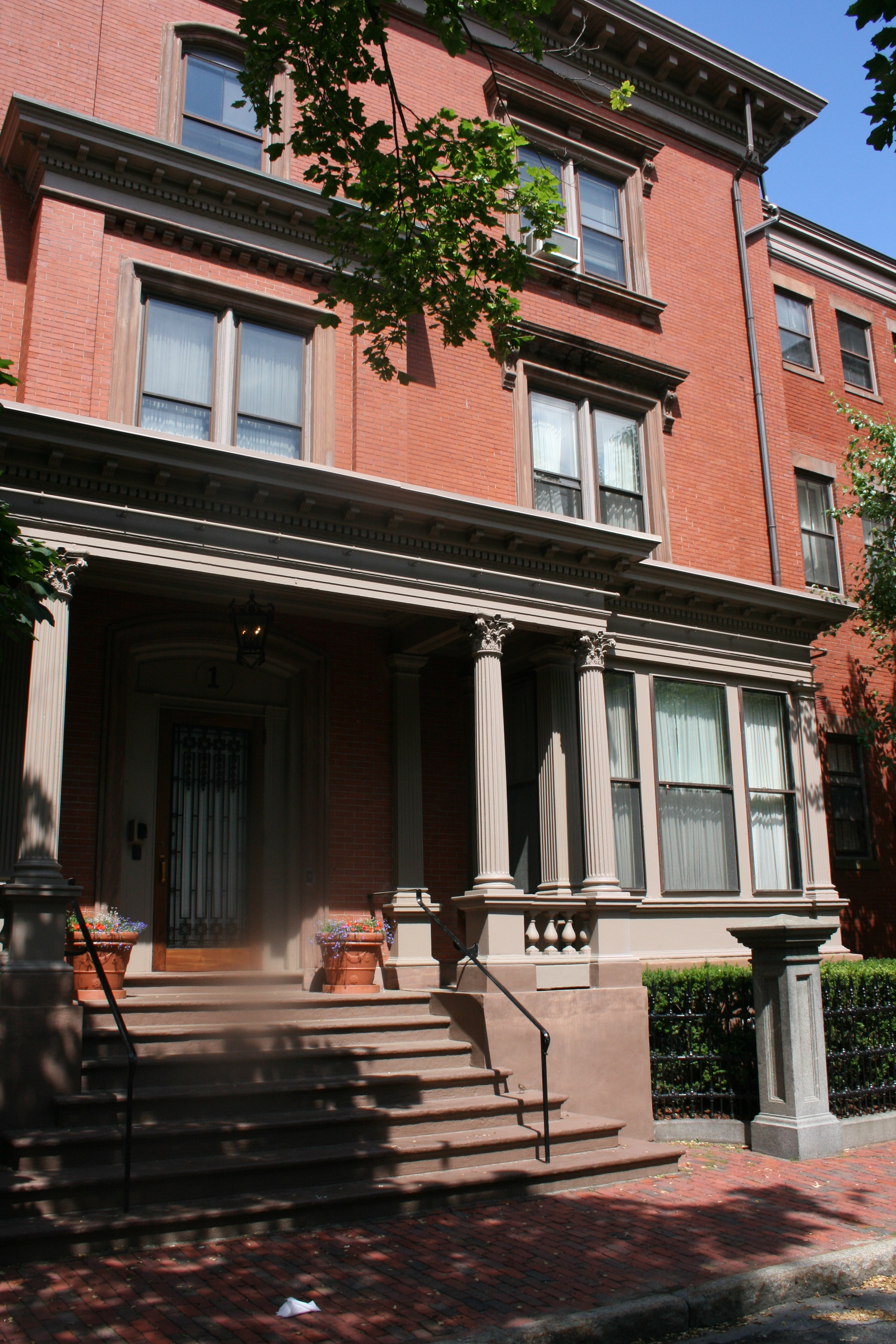

- Location within Massachusetts Location within the United States
- Location: 1 Oak St., Worcester, Massachusetts
- Coordinates: 42°15′56″N 71°48′31″W
- Area: less than one acre
- Built: 1870
- Architect: William R. Walker
- Architectural style: Italianate
- MPS: Worcester MRA
- NRHP reference No.: 80000578
- Added to NRHP: March 05, 1980

The Isaac Davis House is an historic house at 1 Oak Street in Worcester, Massachusetts. It was built in 1870-72 for Isaac Davis (1799-1883), a prominent local lawyer and banker, and is a fine example of Italianate architecture in brick. The house was listed on the National Register of Historic Places in 1980. It is now home to the private Worcester Club.

== Description and history ==
The Isaac Davis House stands in a mixed commercial-residential area west of downtown Worcester, at the northwest corner of Elm and Oak Streets. It is a three-story masonry structure, built primarily out of red brick with brownstone trim, and covered by a low-pitch hip roof. The roof has a modillioned and dentilled cornice, and two similar street-facing main facades. These facades are divided into three bays, with the outer bays consisting of paired windows topped by brownstone architrave caps. The central bays are very slightly recessed, with single windows on the second and third floors. The entries are sheltered by elaborate Corinthian porticos, that on the Oak Street facade being slightly larger.

The house was built in 1870-72 for Isaac Davis (1799-1883), a prominent local lawyer and banker who served as Mayor of Worcester, in the state legislature, and on the state board of education. The house was extensively renovated in 1888 to designs by architect Stephen Earle, which were primarily alterations to its interior. After Davis died in 1883, the house was acquired by the Worcester Club, which has occupied it since then, making a number of modest additions to the rear and side.

== See also ==
- National Register of Historic Places listings in northwestern Worcester, Massachusetts
- National Register of Historic Places listings in Worcester County, Massachusetts
