= Bell Street Chapel =

Historic church in Rhode Island, United States

- U.S. National Register of Historic Places
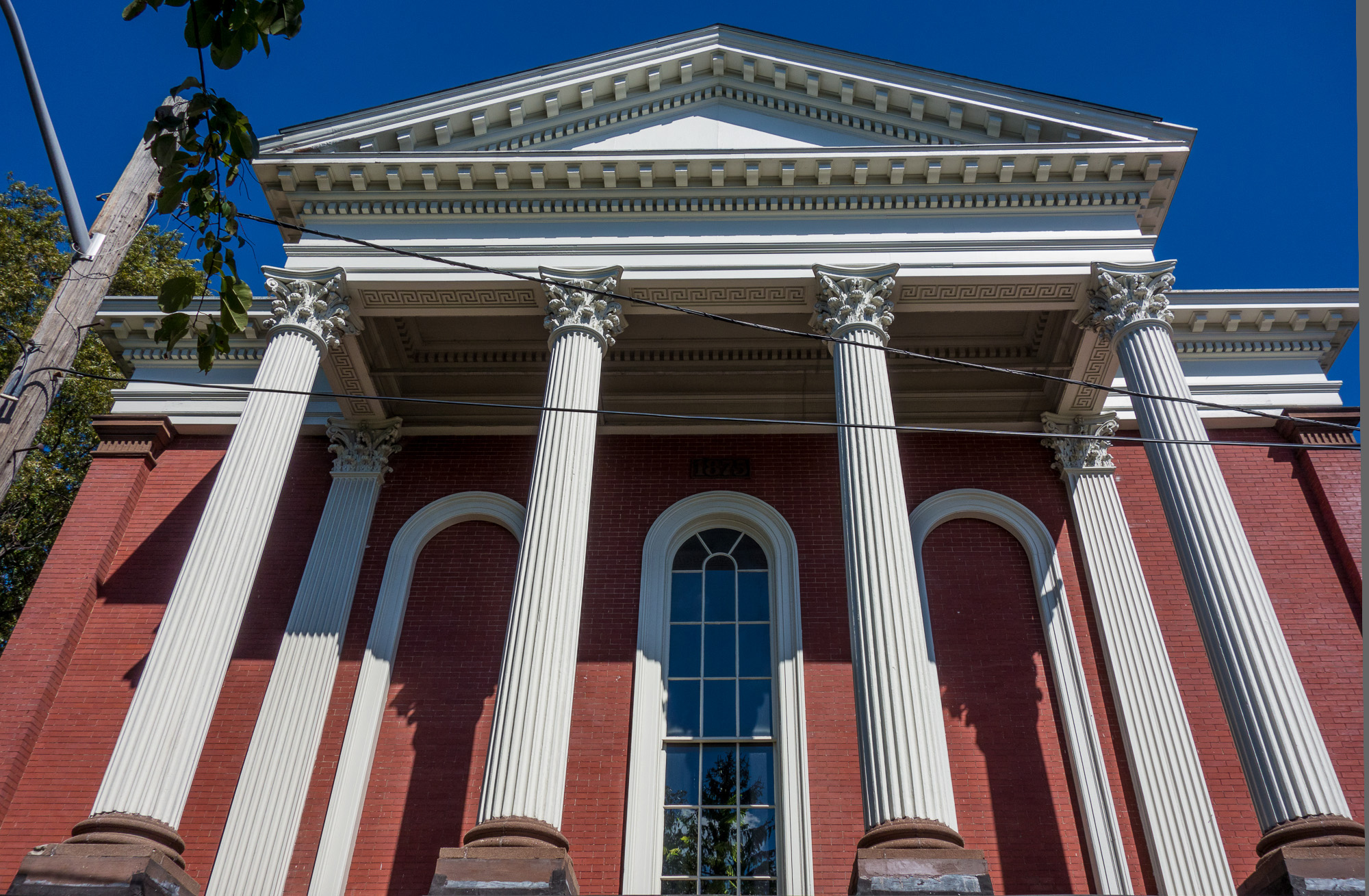
- Bell Street Chapel

- Location within Rhode Island Location within the United States
- Location: Providence, Rhode Island
- Coordinates: 41°49′7″N 71°26′12″W
- Built: 1875
- Architect: Walker, William Russell
- NRHP reference No.: 73000065
- Added to NRHP: March 14, 1973

Bell Street Chapel is a historic Unitarian Universalist chapel church in the Federal Hill neighborhood of Providence, Rhode Island. The church is a member congregation of the Unitarian Universalist Association (UUA).

== History ==
The chapel was built in 1875 by architect William Russell Walker at the behest of James Eddy. Eddy was a wealthy engraver and art dealer who advocated a theology that was unusual for its time. He had a private chapel built on the land adjacent to his property, hoping that he might be able to find some people who agreed with his theology.

The chapel sat largely unused until Eddy's death in 1888. His will created an endowment aimed at keeping the chapel in use well into the future. That endowment is still active today. Anna Garlin Spencer, a Providence philanthropist and philosopher, was asked to spearhead the creation of a new congregation using the chapel. She remained there ten years and was ordained by the congregation as the first female minister of any denomination in the State of Rhode Island.

At the present time, Rev. Frieda Gillespie serves as minister and Kristi Martel serves as music director. Services begin every Sunday morning at 10:00.

Bell Street Chapel was added to the National Register of Historic Places in 1973.

== See also ==
- National Register of Historic Places listings in Providence, Rhode Island
