= Bell Street Park =

Park in Seattle, Washington, United States

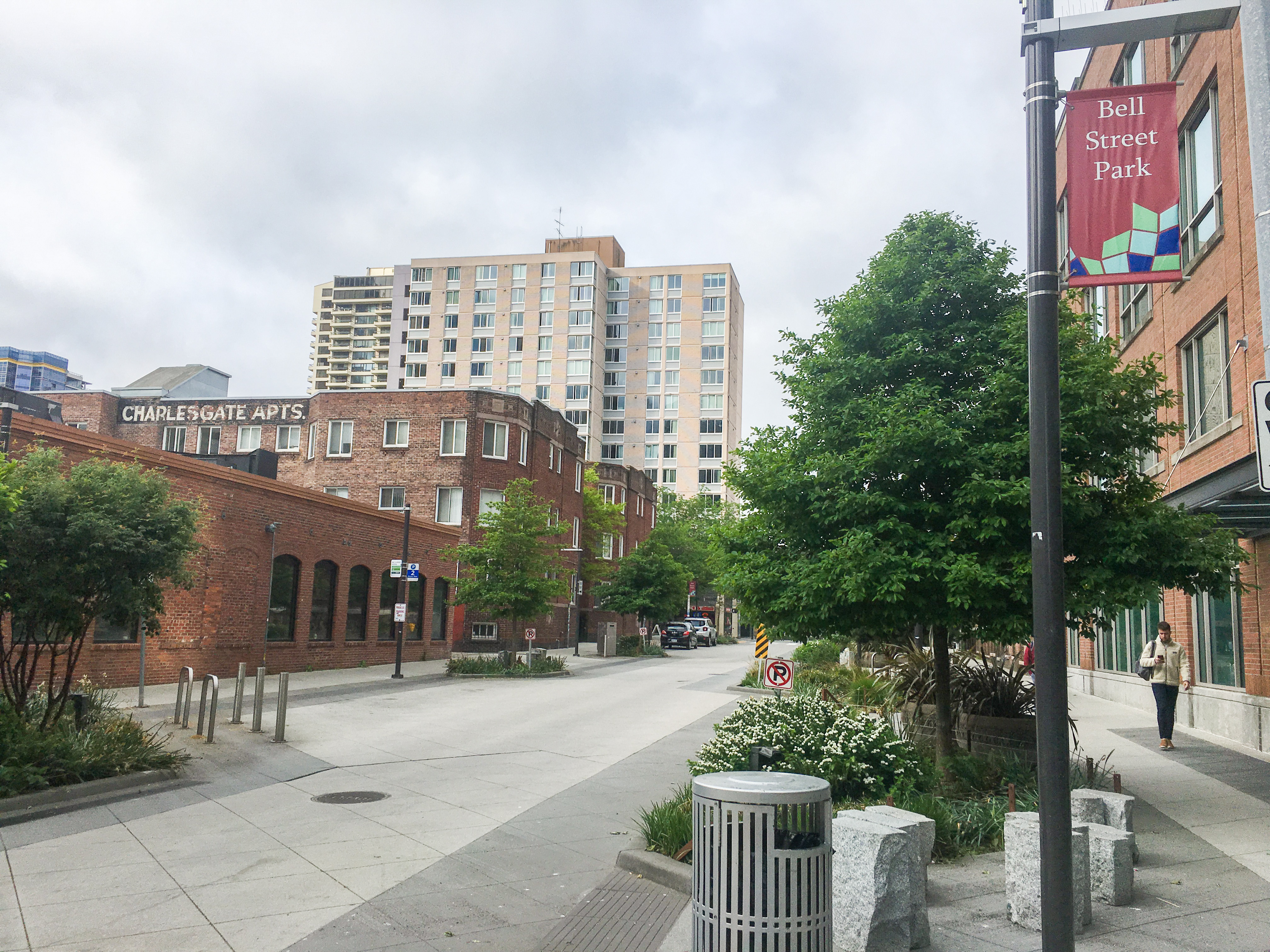
- Bell Street Park, May 2019
- Interactive map of Bell Street Park
- Type: Woonerf
- Location: Belltown, Seattle, Washington
- Coordinates: 47.61536°N 122.34396°W
- Area: 1.33-acre (0.54 ha)
- Opened: April 12, 2014
- Operator: Seattle Parks and Recreation
- Status: Open all year

Bell Street Park is a 1.33-acre (0.54 ha) park, created in 2014 in Seattle, Washington's Belltown neighborhood. Situated in a neighborhood described as a former "hot-spot for low-level crime, drug-dealing and civil disorder", and intended in part to reduce crime rates on the street, the property was transferred from the city's transportation department to Parks and Recreation, and it was redeveloped as a woonerf or mixed-use pedestrian/vehicular traffic area without curbs.

As a woonerf, the park is described as a "grand experiment" in Seattle, and nearly unique in Washington State. It won a design award from the Seattle Design Commission in 2014.

== Other woonerven in the Seattle area ==
=== Seattle ===
Seattle's The Stranger newspaper called it "our first woonerf", and the Seattle Post-Intelligencer called it "downtown's first park boulevard", but some writers say there are others that predated Bell Street Park. According to Seattle University's newspaper, The Commons, the Pike Place and Post Alley area at Pike Place Market is functionally a woonerf, and a woonerf was built at the university's Douglas Building (at the junction of the 12th Avenue and Columbia Street pollinator pathways). Crosscut.com described Occidental Park as a woonerf also. A Seattle Department of Transportation spokesperson said in 2014 that removing curbs at Occidental Park was under consideration.

A section of 8th Avenue in the South Lake Union district of Seattle was proposed by Vulcan Inc. in 2015 as a woonerf along the lines of Bell Street Park.

Construction on 12th Avenue Square Park, a new park and woonerf on East James Court in the Capitol Hill neighborhood, was completed in February 2016.

=== Eastside ===
The curbless redesign of Park Lane in neighboring Kirkland, Washington, completed in 2015, used the Bell Street Park as a reference in the design and selection process.

== Criticism ==
The mixed-use area, called by a local magazine an "experimental ped and car mashup" and by another as a "dog's breakfast" of competing design elements, has resulted in traffic rules that have been called "predatory", and a "ticket trap". One newspaper writer critiqued the woonerf concept for not going far enough and "banning cars altogether".
