= Fallen Firefighters Memorial =

Fallen Firefighters Memorial may refer to:

- Fallen Firefighters Memorial (Wu), a sculpture group by Hai Ying Wu in Seattle, Washington
- IAFF Fallen Fire Fighter Memorial, in Colorado Springs, Colorado
- Los Angeles Fallen Firefighters Memorial, in Los Angeles, California
- National Fallen Firefighters Memorial, in Emmitsburg, Maryland
- New York State Fallen Firefighters Memorial, in Albany, New York

== See also ==
- List of firefighting monuments and memorials
