= WSFM =

WSFM may refer to:

== Media ==
- WSFM-LP, a radio station in Asheville, North Carolina, United States
- Gold 101.7 formerly WSFM 101.7, a free-to-air commercial radio station in Sydney, Australia.
- WAZO, a radio station in Southport, North Carolina, United States formerly known as WSFM from 1988 to 2004
- WUIN (FM), a radio station in Oak Island, North Carolina, United States known as WSFM from 2004 to 2011
- WLTT, a defunct radio station (1180 AM) formerly licensed to serve Carolina Beach, North Carolina, United States which held the call sign WSFM from 2011 to 2013
- WHKF, a radio station licensed to Harrisburg, Pennsylvania, United States which held the call sign WSFM from 1965 until the 1980s

== Other ==
- Weather System Follow-on Microwave, an environmental satellite program
- Web Services Formal Methods
- Western State Fire Managers
- Wisconsin State Firefighters Memorial
- World Swim For Malaria
