= Mooney Memorial Fountain =

Heritage-listed memorial in Brisbane, Queensland

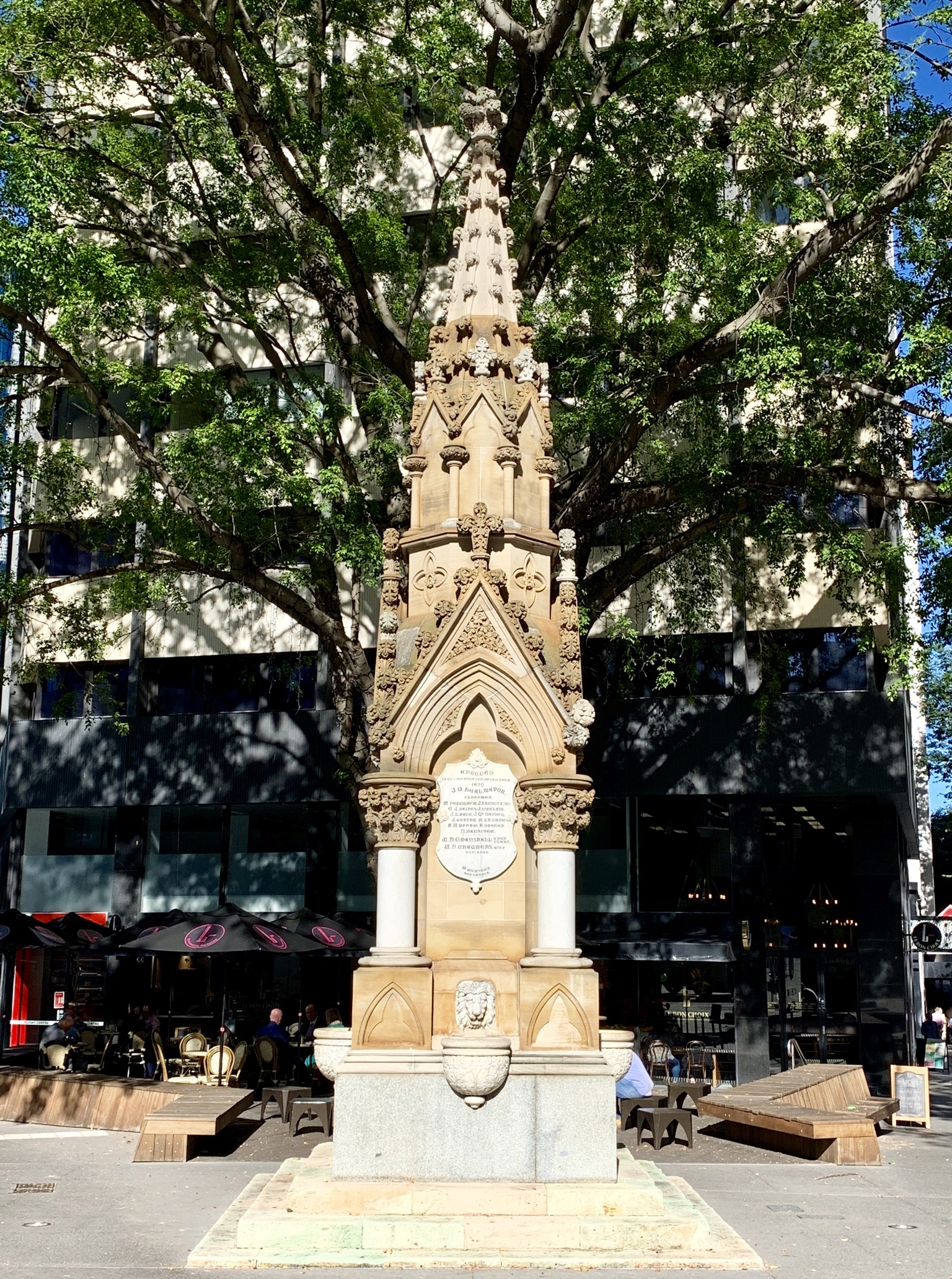
- Mooney Memorial Fountain, 2019

- Location within Queensland Location within Australia
- 27.466°S 153.0302°E
- Location: 118 Eagle Street, Brisbane City, City of Brisbane, Queensland, Australia

History
- Design period: 1870s–1890s (late 19th century)
- Built: 1878–1880

Site notes
- Architect: William Holloway Chambers

Queensland Heritage Register
- Official name: Eagle Street Fountain, Mooney Memorial Fountain
- Type: state heritage (built)
- Designated: 21 October 1992
- Reference no.: 600087
- Significant period: 1878– (social); 1878–1880 (fabric)
- Significant components: memorial – drinking fountain, tree
- Sculptor: William Webster

Mooney Memorial Fountain is a heritage-listed memorial at 118 Eagle Street, Brisbane City, City of Brisbane, Queensland, Australia. It was designed by William Holloway Chambers and built from 1878 to 1880 by William Webster. It is also known as Eagle Street Fountain. It was added to the Queensland Heritage Register on 21 October 1992.

== History ==
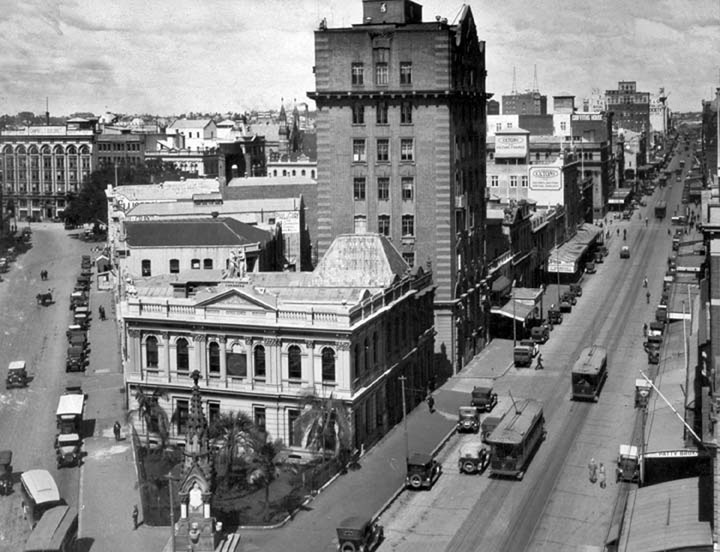
Mooney Memorial Fountain, corner of Queen and Eagle Streets, October 1926

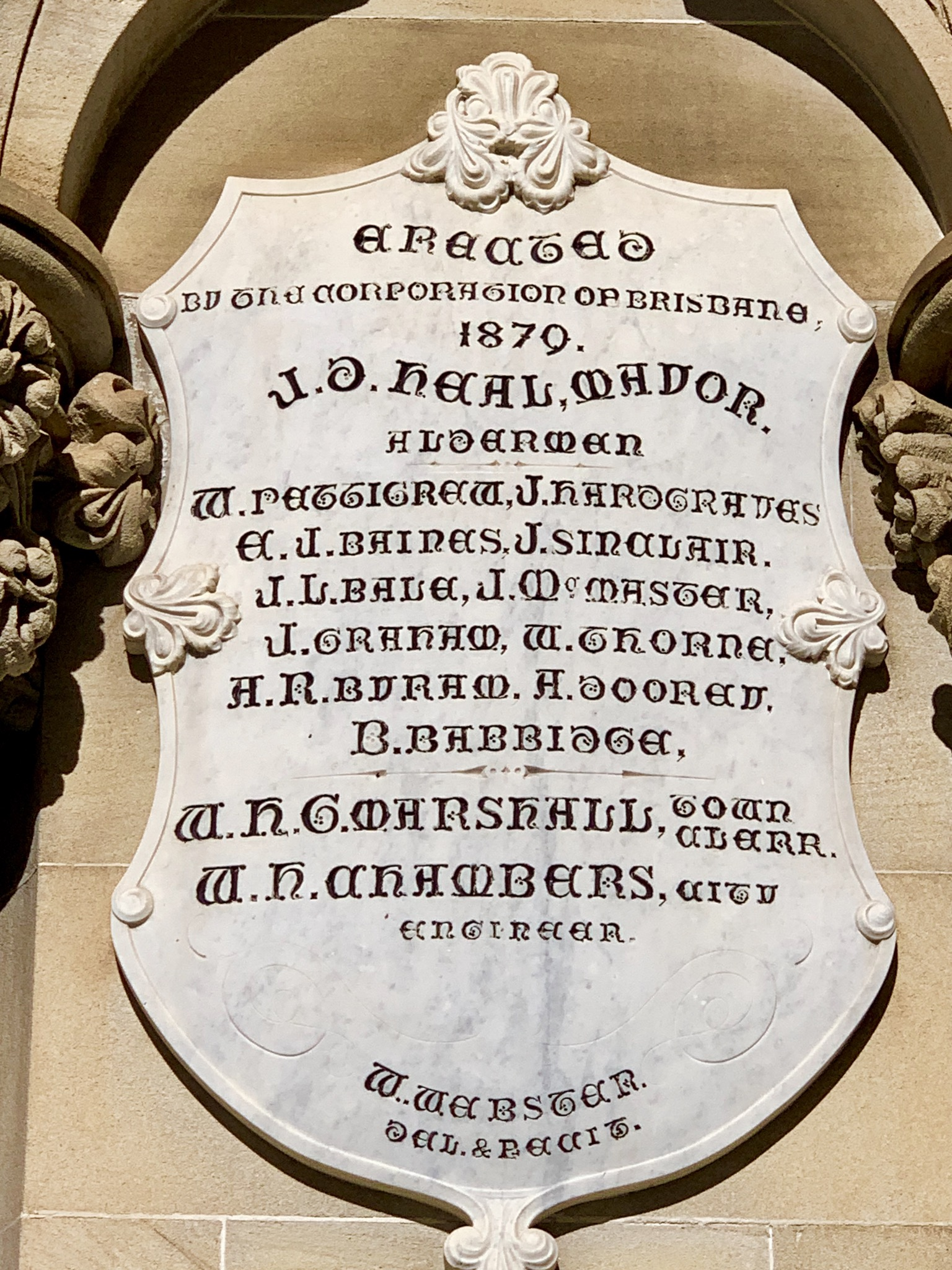
Inscriptions of the aldermen etc., 2013

This fountain, erected between 1878 and 1880, was designed by the City Engineer, William Holloway Chambers. It was built at a cost of £627 as part of measures to enhance the visual character of that part of the city. The fountain was funded by the Brisbane Municipal Council and public subscriptions. The fountain incorporated local porphyry (Brisbane tuff), Murphys Creek sandstone, and imported granite and marble. Inscribed on the fountain were the names of the Aldermen in the 1879 Brisbane Town Council, the City Engineer, the Town Clerk, and William Webster, the sculptor.

The fountain popularly became known as the Mooney Memorial Fountain. This name arose through donations given at the time towards a memorial to James Mooney, a volunteer fireman who had lost his life while fighting a fire in Queen Street in March 1877. The official Mooney Memorial, however, was erected above Mooney's grave at Toowong Cemetery using funds raised publicly by his friends and fire-fighter colleagues.

In the 1970s, the Mooney Memorial Fountain was depicted in an oil painting by Simone Azzopardi.

When the Eagle Street fountain was restored in 1988, a special tablet was inscribed as a dedication to James Mooney and to other firemen who had lost their lives in the line of duty.

== Description ==
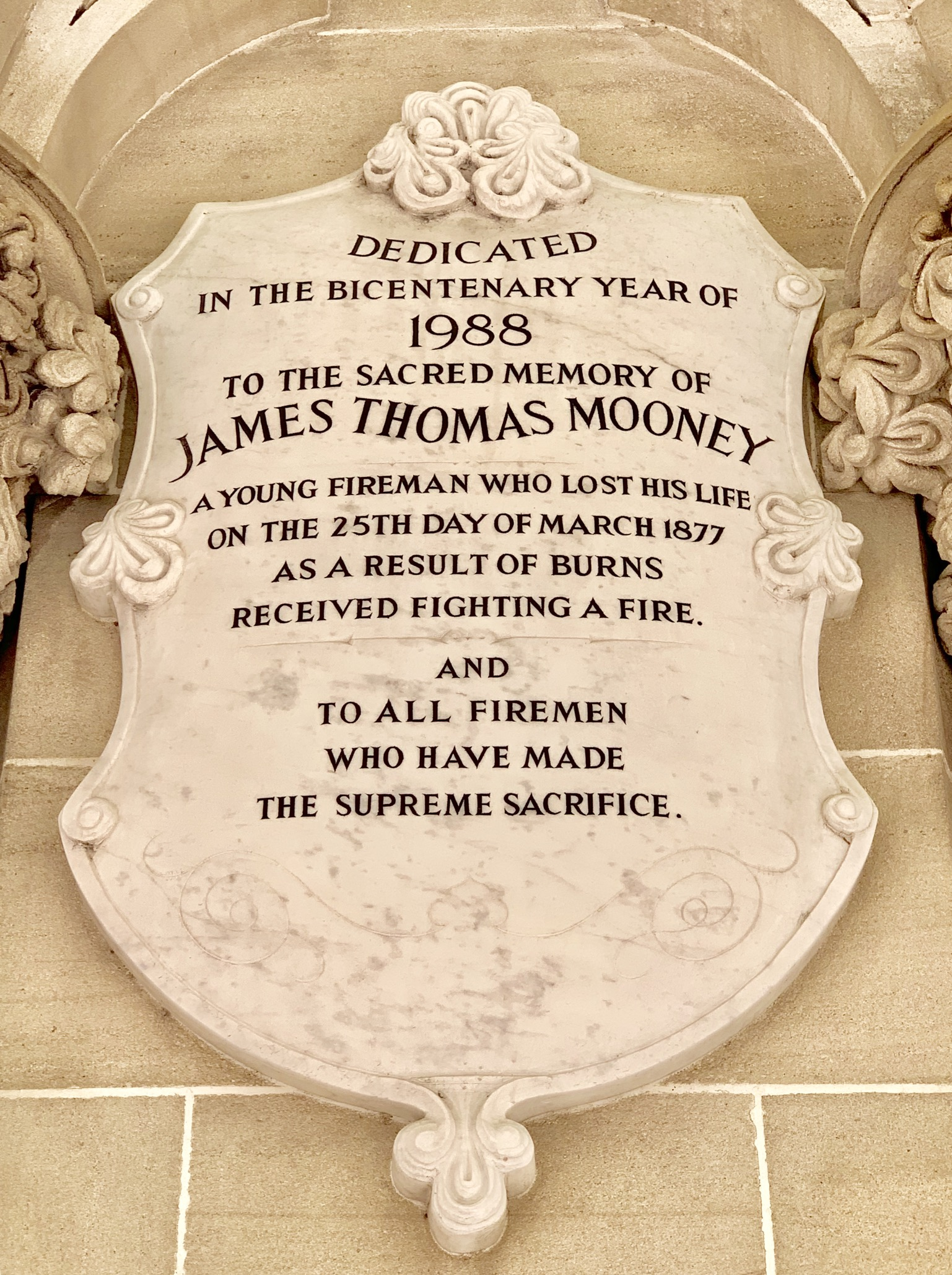
Plaque commemoriating James Mooney, 2013

This highly decorative drinking fountain stands on a triangular piece of land at the junction of Queen and Eagle Streets. The foundation and steps are 3.9 metres (13 ft) square and built of porphyry (Brisbane tuff). The base is 2.1 metres (6 ft 11 in) square and built of granite from Mount Alexander in Victoria.

It has four corner columns on its granite base, with richly foliated capitals and raised pedestals, surmounted by four Gothic arches which support a foliated and ribbed spire. The spire, which was originally topped by an ornate finial, rises to 10 metres (33 ft) above the ground. The portion between the columns and below the arches is of sandstone ashlar, and this is where the plaques are located. Three lions heads above ornate basins, all of white Sicilian marble are located between the base of the piers on three sides of the fountain. The water supply through the heads was regulated by a system easily accessible by the removal of a single stone.

Although the fountain originally dominated the Eagle Street corner, the scale of recent adjacent high-rise buildings has lessened its visual impact. However, a large fig nearby supports its present claim as a landmark.

== Heritage listing ==
Eagle Street Fountain was listed on the Queensland Heritage Register on 21 October 1992 having satisfied the following criteria.

The place is important in demonstrating the evolution or pattern of Queensland's history.

The place is important in demonstrating the principal characteristics of a particular class of cultural places.

The place is important because of its aesthetic significance.

The place has a special association with the life or work of a particular person, group or organisation of importance in Queensland's history.

The Eagle Street Fountain is significant as an excellent example of a Victorian era public monument and amenity of careful and ornate design and fine materials and workmanship.

Situated at the intersection of Queen and Eagle Streets, the Eagle Street Fountain is significant for its landmark value.

The Eagle Street Fountain is significant for its association with James Mooney, a volunteer fireman who had lost his life while fighting a fire in Queen Street in March 1877.

== See also ==
- List of firefighting monuments and memorials
