= Charles Parker Dowler =

American sculptor

Charles Parker Dowler (1841–1941) was an American sculptor active in Providence, Rhode Island.

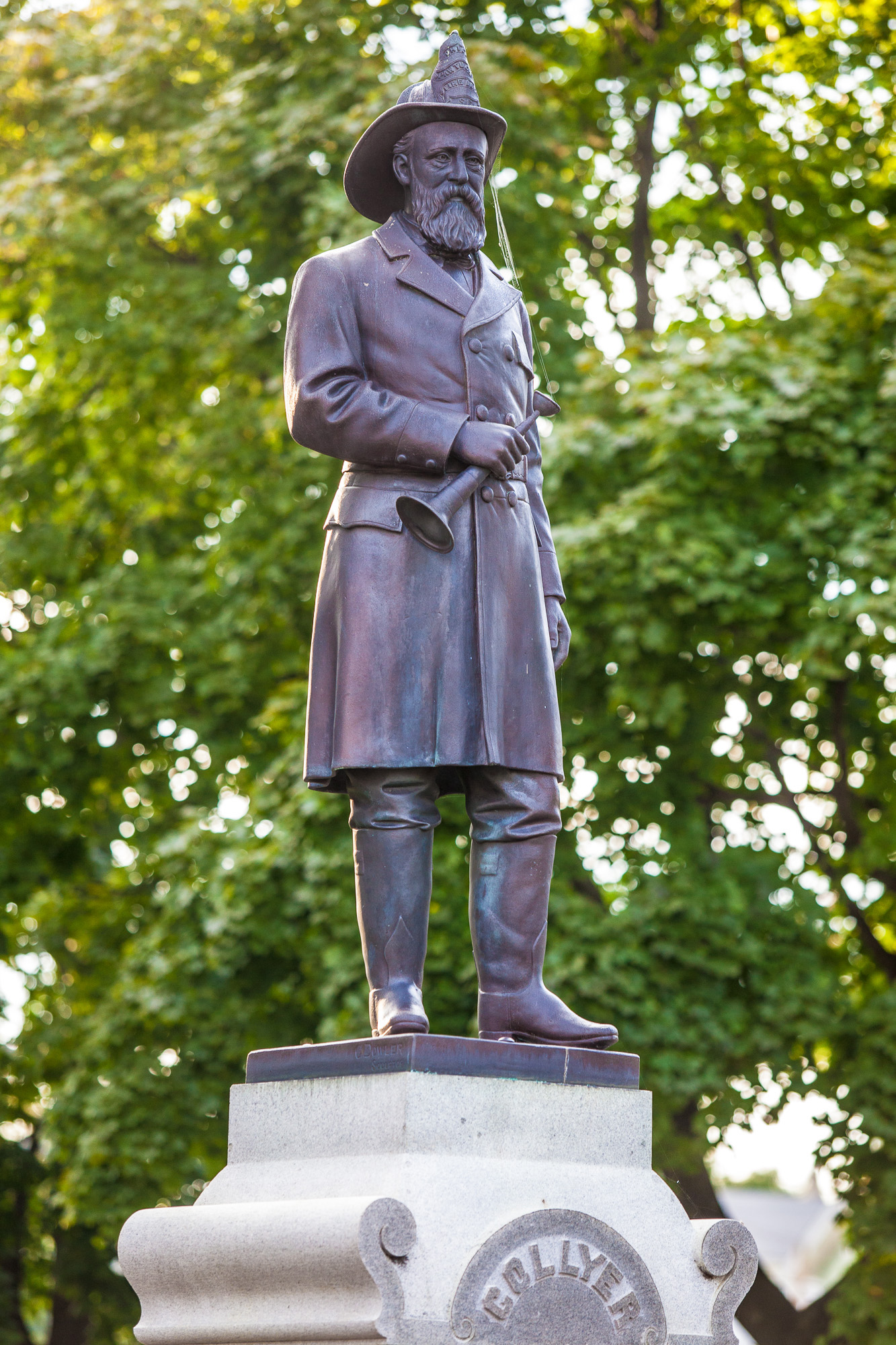
The Collyer Monument by Charles Parker Dowler

Dowler was born in Birmingham, England, and immigrated to the United States in 1863 as a gunsmith. After the Civil War's end, he became a sculptor and woodcarver. Industries and Wealth of the Principal Points in Rhode Island, 1892, states that his "operations consist largely in carvings, modeling and chiseling in plaster; executing any kind of design for interior and exterior decorations; also models for monumental workers or stone workers to copy from." Today he is best known for the Collyer Monument in Pawtucket, Rhode Island, and the John Sparks Monument in Bristol, Rhode Island. His house, the Charles Dowler House, is listed on the National Register of Historic Places.
