= Indiana Law Enforcement and Firefighters Memorial =

Public artwork and memorial in Indianapolis, Indiana, US

- Indiana Law Enforcement and Fire Fighters Memorial
- Year: 2001
- Type: Limestone
- Location: Indianapolis, Indiana; 39°46′8.70″N 86°9′49.88″W
- Owner: State of Indiana

The Indiana Law Enforcement and Firefighters Memorial, officially titled the Indiana Law Enforcement and Fire Fighters Memorial, is a public artwork and memorial dedicated to law enforcement officers and firefighters from Indiana who lost their lives in the line of duty. Its design and construction was the collaborative effort of a broad range of professionals, including architects, landscapers, engineers, and construction experts. The memorial is located adjacent to the Indiana Government Center North, on the northwest corner of Bicentennial Plaza and Senate Avenue in downtown Indianapolis, Indiana, United States. The memorial was dedicated on June 6, 2001, after ten months of planning and construction. The dedication was held three days before the opening of the World Police and Fire Games that were held in Indianapolis that year.

== Description ==
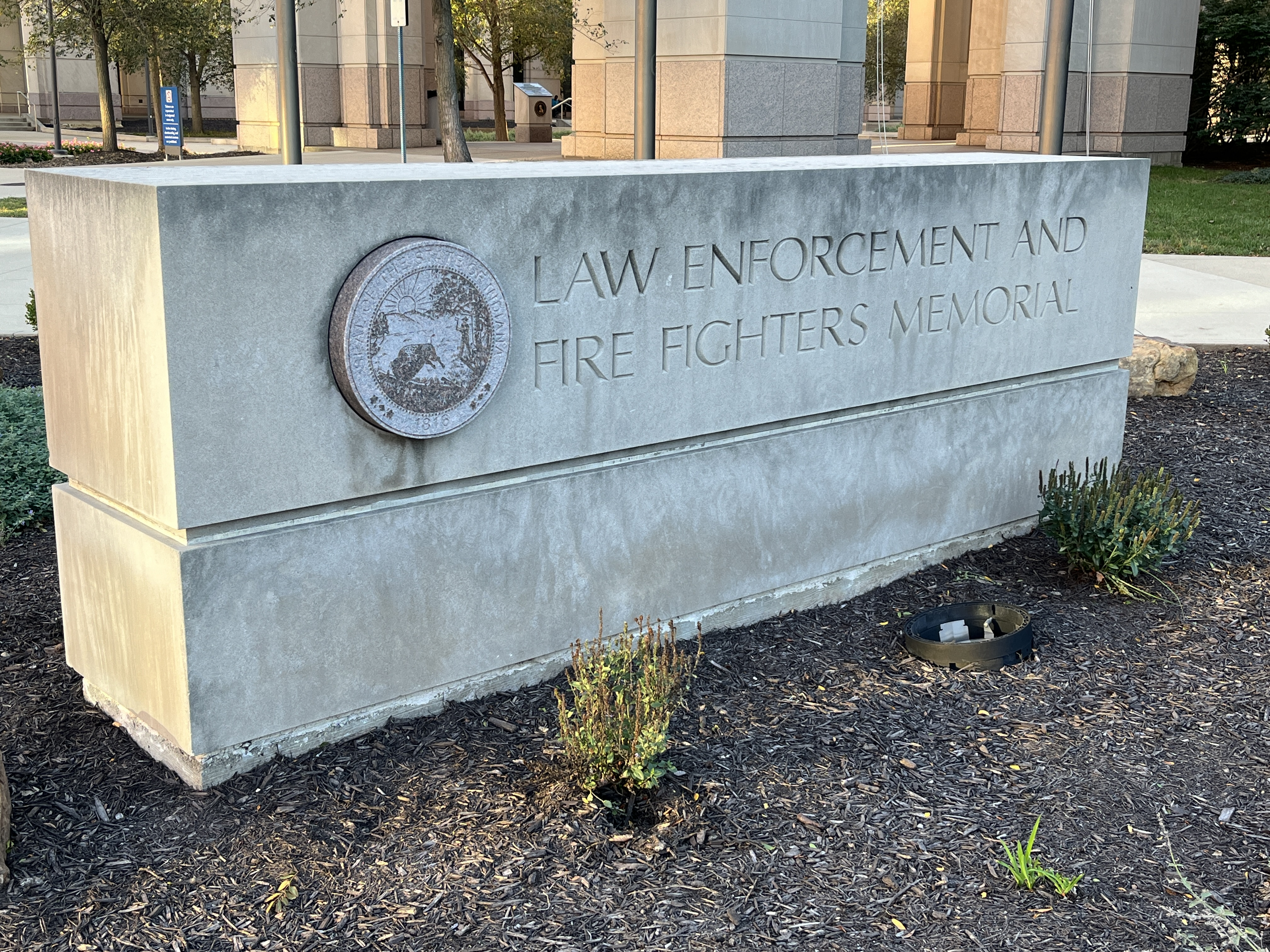
Sign for the memorial, 2024

A sign marks the pathway to the memorial, which is in a park-like setting with many trees and benches. A fountain in the shape of the Indiana state flag is featured in the center of the memorial. Large pylons support bronze medallions, each weighing approximately 500 pounds (230 kg).

The proper right side of the memorial area is designated to honor law enforcement officers killed in the line of duty. The bronze medallion atop the Indiana Limestone pylon displays a uniformed police officer standing next to Saint Michael Archangel, patron of police. In the center of each of the two pylons are laminated books which visitors can search for the names of individuals who are memorialized on the monument, and directions for locating the name. Behind the pylon stand eleven groups of three gray granite panels (thirty-three panels total) with the names of Indiana police officers who have died in the line of duty etched into the granite.

To the proper left is the area designated to honor firefighters who were killed in the line of duty. A bronze medallion depicting the Firefighter shield sits atop the pylon to the proper left. Behind the pylon stand eleven groups of three gray granite panels (thirty-three panels total) with the names of Indiana firefighters who have died in the line of duty etched into the granite. The law enforcement and firefighter panels mirror one another and create a semicircle.

This memorial is a series of pieces, constructed from gray granite, Indiana Limestone, and bronze. The only easily identifiable inscriptions are part of the memorial itself, including the names of the deceased that are etched into the granite, as well as words of dedication on the pylons. There are no visible artist or foundry marks.

The memorial was built just 16 inches (410 mm) above a pedestrian tunnel, so extra care was taken during the construction to provide for proper weight distribution, stability, and drainage.

== Historical information ==
Under the direction of the State of Indiana and the Indiana Firefighters Memorial Committee, the planning, design, and construction for the Indiana Law Enforcement and Fire Fighters Memorial commenced in August 2000. The work was completed and unveiled on June 6, 2001, just three days prior to the opening ceremonies of the World Police and Fire Games that were being held in Indianapolis that year.

The price for the construction of the memorial was approximately $1 million.

In 2002, Glenroy Construction was awarded the BKD Governor's Award for their work on the memorial. This award is granted for exceeding the award criteria and for a structure that provides a positive impact on the community.

== Artist ==
The design and construction of the Indiana Law Enforcement and Fire Fighters Memorial was a collaborative effort. Indiana based company Glenroy Construction Company; Ken Boyce of Ratio Architects; Patrick Brunner, architect; and Bonnie Sheridan Coghlan, architect, and Indianapolis based Becker Landscape participated in the design and construction of the memorial.

== See also ==
- List of firefighting monuments and memorials
- Vietnam Veterans Memorial Wall
