= Monumento ao Bombeiro =

Firefighter monument in Portugal

Coordinates: 38°46′42.47″N 9°15′39.11″W

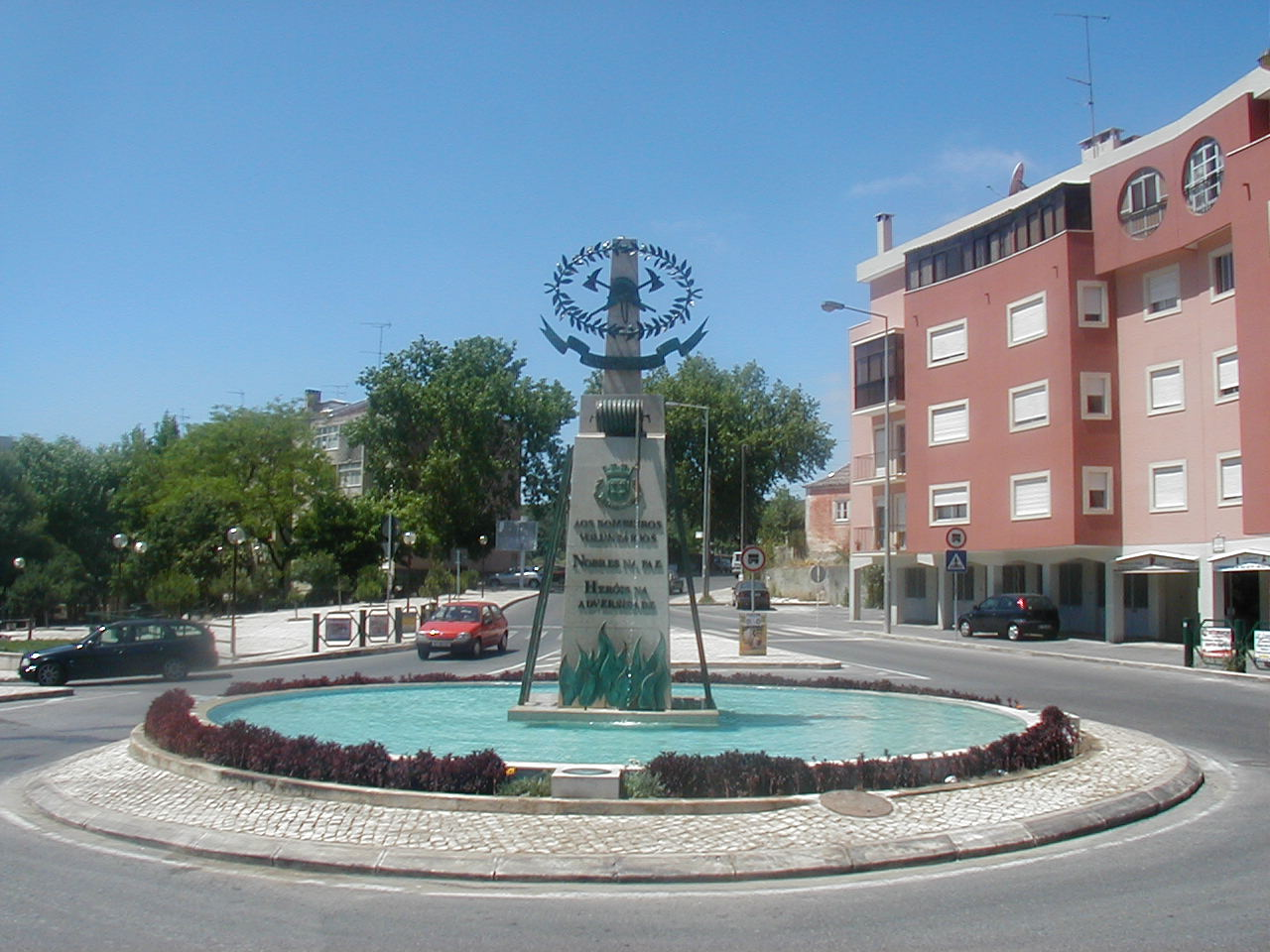
The Monument to the Firefighter memorial, in the traffic circlein the Monumento ao Bombeiro

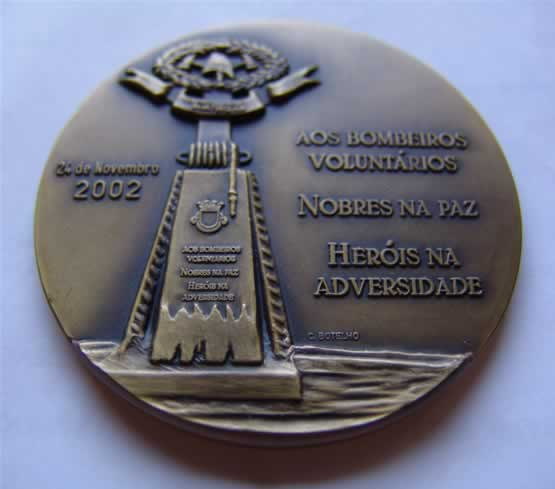
A bronze medal minted to homage the firefighters: Our volunteer firefighters/Noble in peace/Heroes in adversity

The Monumento ao Bombeiro or Monument to the Firefighter is a monument/memorial located in the civil parish of Belas, in the municipality of Sintra, in the central region of Portugal.

The Monumento was designed to honour the service and sacrifice of several firemen, who lost their lives in 1967, during their efforts to rescue people during the torrential downpours that breached the banks of the Jamor River, causing heavy flooding. In addition to the firemen, many people lost their lives and extensive property damage.

Dedicated to Belas' Volunteer Firefighters, the monument was officially dedicated on 24 November 2002, with the presence of the Secretário de Estado adjunto do Ministério da Administração Interna (Adjunct-Secretary of State for the Ministry of Internal Administration), Luís Pais de Sousa and president of the municipality, Fernando Seara, along with other politicians, dignitaries and officials, marking the 35th anniversary of the tragedy. In a speech addressing the crowd, the president of the parish council, Guilherme Dias, reminded the crowd that the statute "served to demonstrate to the people, the respect [we] have for the firefighters. At the bottom we transform in bronze our collective sentiment". In addition to the inauguration, the event served to inaugurate the new vehicles and forest-fighting equipment, ambulances and generators that were acquired for the institution.

A medal was impressed officially to honour the firefighters and pay homage to the people who died in the tragedy.

The monument was designed and created by the artist Bottelho.

== See also ==
- List of firefighting monuments and memorials
