= Potter–Collyer House =

Historic house in Rhode Island, United States

- U.S. National Register of Historic Places
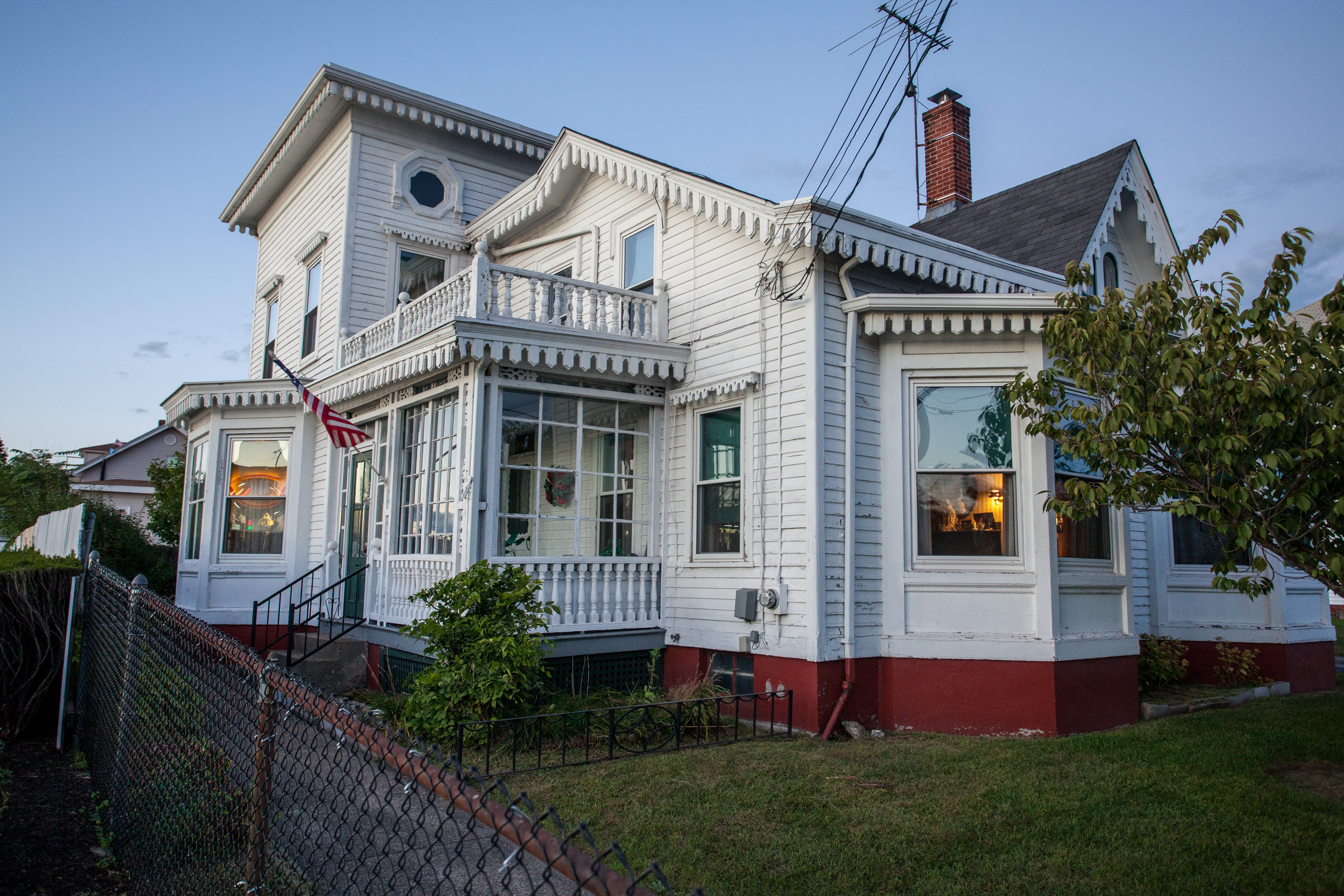

- Location within Rhode Island Location within the United States
- Location: 67 Cedar Street, Pawtucket, Rhode Island
- Coordinates: 41°52′24″N 71°23′23″W
- Area: less than one acre
- Built: 1863
- MPS: Pawtucket MRA
- NRHP reference No.: 83003849
- Added to NRHP: 1983

The Potter–Collyer House is a historic house at 67 Cedar Street in Pawtucket, Rhode Island. The house, first constructed in 1863, is representative of vernacular architecture of the Pawtucket due to the great modifications to the home which has obscured the original structure of the home. Believed to have begun as a 1 1/2-story cottage with a gable roof, subsequent additions and expansions have added a two-story hip-roof addition and greatly altered the floor plan due to enlargement and remodeling. The Potter–Collyer House was added to the National Register of Historic Places in 1983.

== History ==
The house was originally constructed in 1863 for Elisha O. Potter, but it was sold to Samuel S. Collyer four years later. Little is known of Potter's life, but Collyer was a partner in the N. S. Collyer & Company. Collyer would later become the Chief of the Pawtucket Fire Department in 1874 and died in 1884 from injuries sustained in the line of duty. Collyer would be memorialized by the town with the Collyer Monument, which is also on the National Register of Historic Places. The house was moved 400 feet (120 m) from its original location in 1962 due to the construction of Interstate 95 in Rhode Island.

== Design ==
The house is a timber-frame house that was originally constructed on the west side of Pine Street, but its original form is not known for sure due to the extent of its expansion and remodeling. The NRHP nomination states that it could have been a 1 1/2-story gabled roof cottage with a cross-gable in the center, a style popular during the mid-century in Pawtucket. This original structure retains little of its form except for the Gothic hood moulds on the second floor end windows and the Gothic bargeboards. A two-story hipped roof addition was constructed in two phases, one completed before 1877 and the other between 1895 and 1902. Though the NRHP also states that the original house was enlarged in the late 1860s or 1870s without specification to the work done at the time. The additions include a bay window on the facade and openwork on the porch sides. The later alterations to the building worked to complement the distinctive bargeboards of the cottage with the work on the eaves and window heads of the addition.

The house has an unconventional floor plan which has two doorways on opposite ends of the original cottage with the main entrance formerly on the east side. The NRHP nomination again notes that the doorways may have replaced an earlier vestibule on the original house. The eastern entrance leads to a library/office, that may have originally been a stairhall, and is connected to the eastern of the two front rooms. The western doorway, opposite, leads to a hallway with a three-run staircase with newels and balusters. The western room has a Renaissance Revival-style built-in bookcase and a slate fireplace mantel. The rear addition holds the dining room which has a "pseudo-exposed-beam ceiling" dated to around 1909. Though not detailed in the NRHP listing, the survey notes that the upstairs is simple in detail and appears intact, but that the "chamber floor plan in the front of the house appears to have been altered during the 1880s remodeling".

== Significance ==
The Potter–Collyer House is architecturally significant as a unique example of vernacular architecture of Pawtucket in the 19th century. The NRHP nomination states that the alterations and remodeling of the home have produced a "most unusually composed and picturesquely detailed [building]." Despite having been moved and altered, the house is unique and significant example of vernacular architecture. The Potter–Collyer House was added to the National Register of Historic Places in 1983.

== See also ==
- National Register of Historic Places listings in Pawtucket, Rhode Island
