= Charles Dowler House =

Historic house in Rhode Island, United States

- U.S. National Register of Historic Places
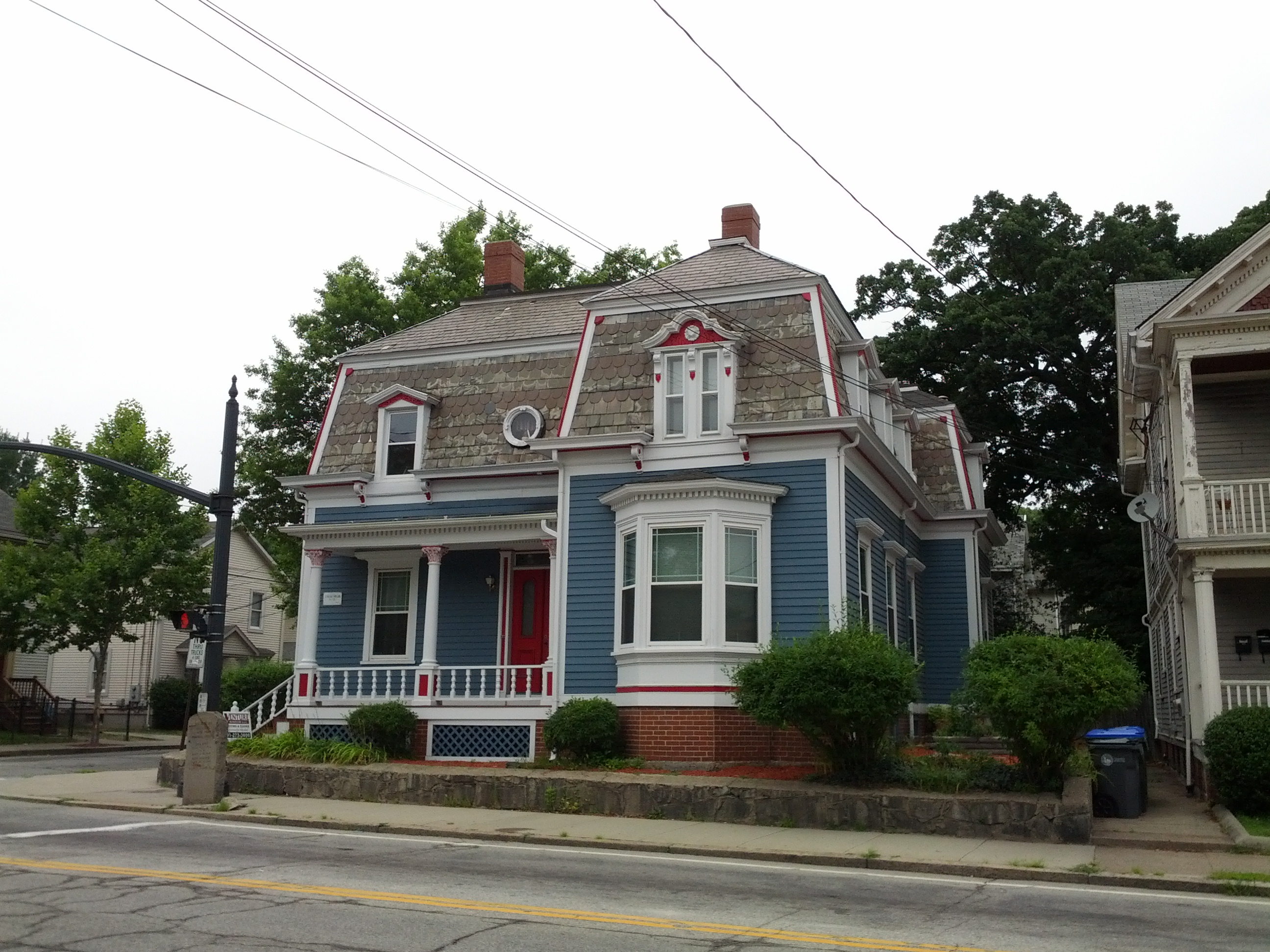

- Location within Rhode Island Location within the United States
- Location: Providence, Rhode Island
- Coordinates: 41°50′9″N 71°25′51″W
- Built: 1877
- NRHP reference No.: 84001955
- Added to NRHP: February 23, 1984

The Charles Dowler House is an historic house at 581 Smith Street in Providence, Rhode Island. It is a 1 1/2-story mansard-roofed wood-frame structure, built in 1872 by Charles Parker Dowler, a local artist. The building typifies a cottage ornée, or decorated cottage, a building style popular in the 1860s and 1870s. It is an elaborately decorated Second Empire structure, with an asymmetrical T layout, detailed decoration in the dormers which pierce the fish-scale-shingled mansard roof, and a porch in the crook of the T which is supported by Corinthian columns. The interior retains both extensive period woodwork and wall paintings.

The house was listed on the National Register of Historic Places in 1984.

== See also ==
- National Register of Historic Places listings in Providence, Rhode Island
