= List of firefighting monuments and memorials =

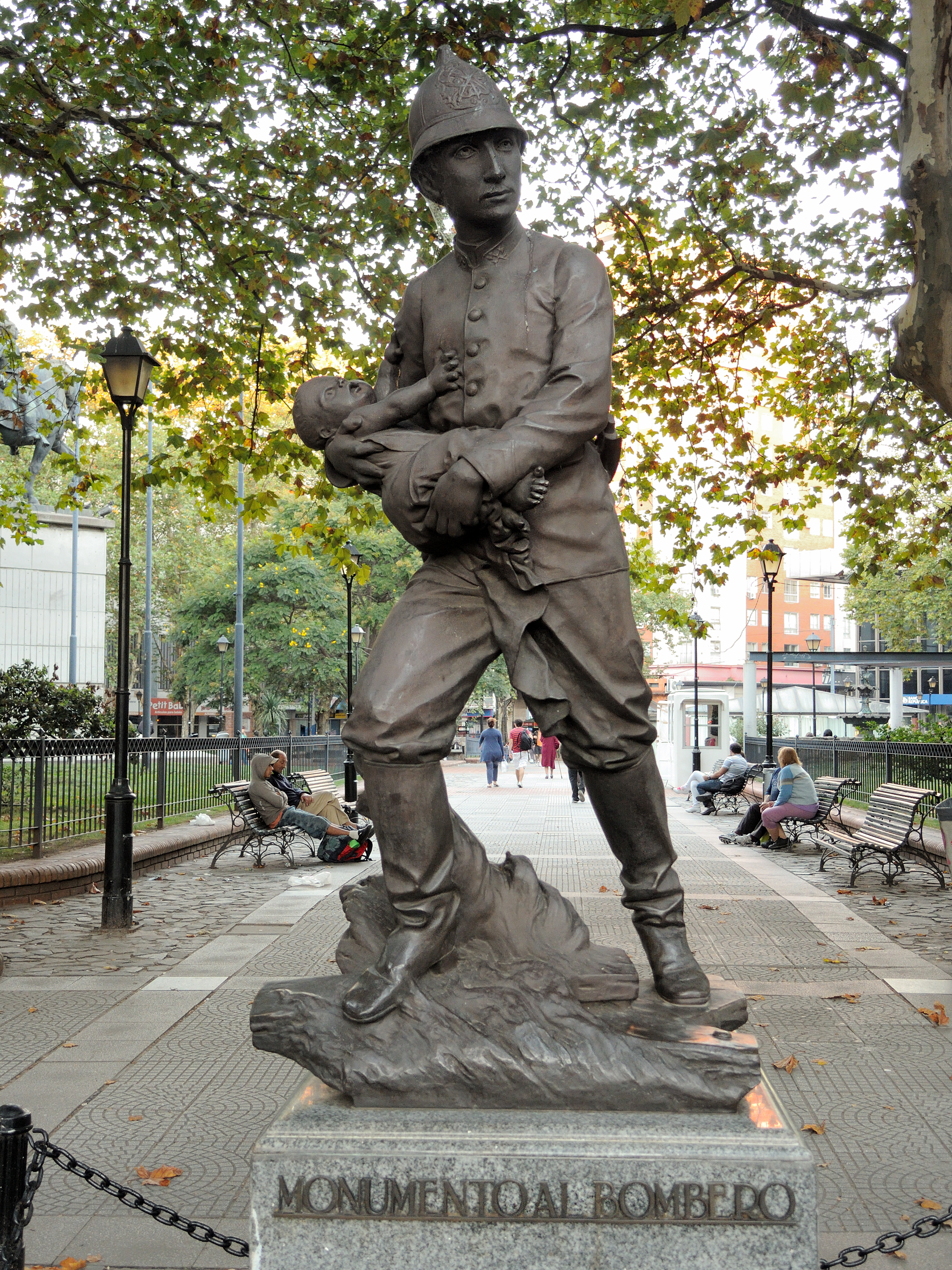
Firefighter Monument, Montevideo, Uruguay.

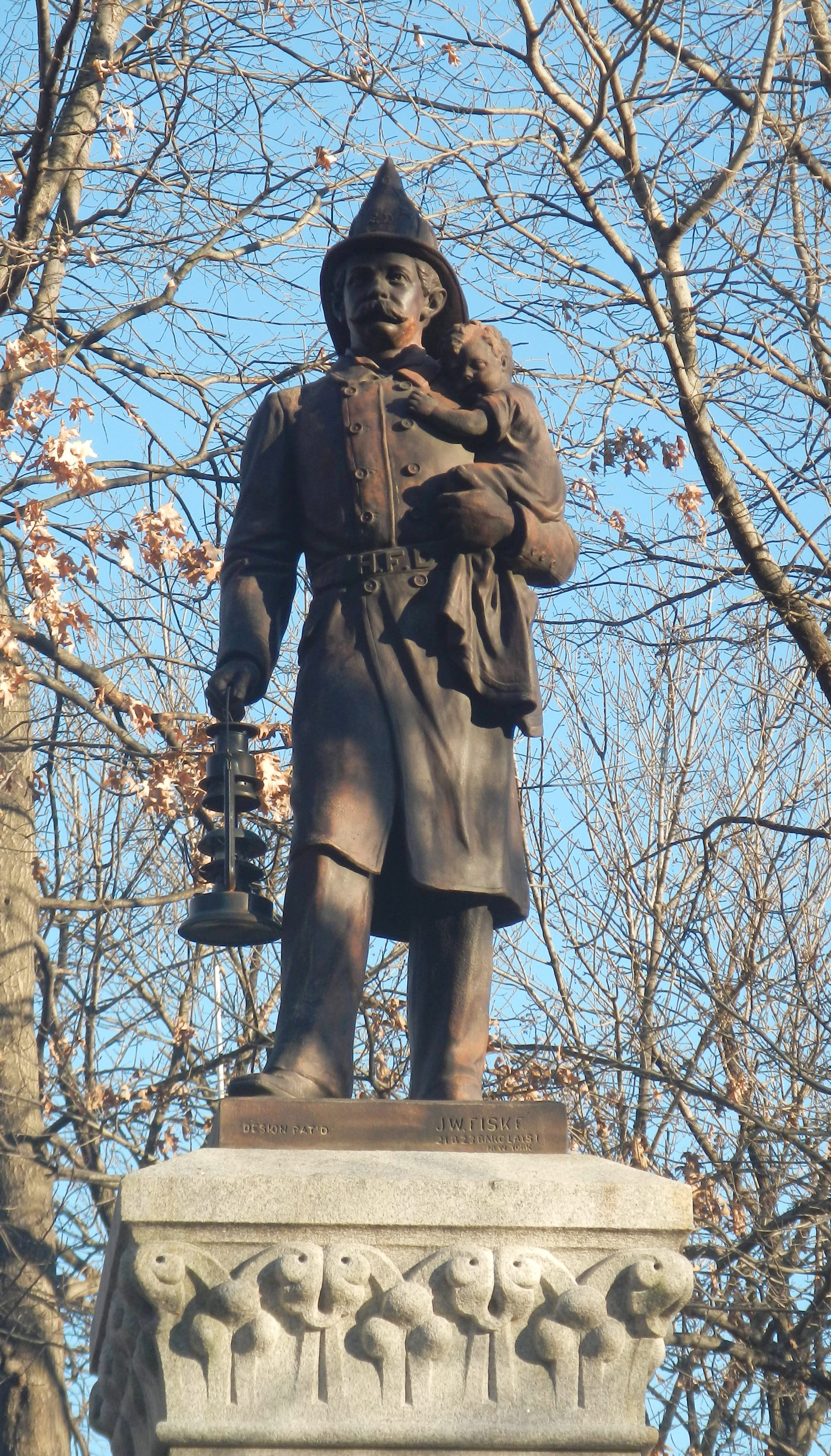
1891 monument in Hoboken, New Jersey

The list of firefighting monuments and memorials covers firefighters' contributions, and some memorials to other fire victims, such as the mass memorial to unknown victims of the 1871 Peshtigo fire, which caused the greatest loss of life of any fire in the United States. Several of the monuments and memorials are listed on historic registers such as, in the U.S., the National Register of Historic Places (NRHP).

== Australia ==
- Firefighters' Memorial Grove or Firefighters Memorial Grove (2014), Kings Park, Western Australia
- Mooney Memorial Fountain (1880), Brisbane, Queensland
- Firefighters Memorial Wall, CFA Training College, Fiskville, Victoria, access closed in 2015
- Victorian Emergency Services Memorial, Melbourne, Victoria, expected to be complete by 2019.
- Fallen Firefighter Memorial, Richmond, Victoria

== Canada ==
- Canadian Firefighters Memorial, Ottawa, dedicated in 2012
- The Halifax Explosion of 6 December 1917 involved a blast and fires which killed more than 2,000 persons. One memorial work was the Halifax Explosion Memorial Sculpture which was located at the Halifax North Memorial Library, itself another memorial to the event.
- Ontario Firefighters Memorial, Toronto

== Germany ==
- Memorial, near Meinersen, to five firemen who died in the 1975 Fire on the Lüneburg Heath, the largest forest fire in the nation

== Poland ==
A 1986 stamp commemorated the Warsaw Fire Guard

== Portugal ==
- Monumento ao Bombeiro, Sintra

== United Kingdom ==
- National Firefighters Memorial (1998), London
- Statue of James Braidwood (2008), located in Parliament Square in Edinburgh, Scotland. He founded what is asserted to be the world's first municipal fire service, in Edinburgh, after the Great Fire of Edinburgh in 1824.
- Plaque for firefighter William Rae, Hunter Street, Glasgow

== United States ==
- David Campbell Memorial, Portland, Oregon
- Granite Mountain Hotshots Memorial State Park (2016), near Yarnell, Arizona, including a memorial of rock gabions
- Los Angeles Fallen Firefighters Memorial is at the Los Angeles Fire Department Museum and Memorial in Los Angeles, California
- The Stentorians and the African American Firefighter Museum, Los Angeles, California
- The California Firefighters Memorial in Sacramento, California is a wall with the names of hundreds of firefighters.
- California State Capitol Museum, Sacramento, California.
- IAFF Fallen Fire Fighter Memorial, Colorado Springs, Colorado
- Wildland Firefighters National Monument (2000), Boise, Idaho
- St. Maries 1910 Fire Memorial (1924), St. Maries, Idaho
- Wallace 1910 Fire Memorial (1921), Wallace, Idaho
- Memorial honoring firefighters fallen in the 1910 Stockyard fire, at the Union Stock Yard Gate, Chicago, Illinois
- Indiana Law Enforcement and Firefighters Memorial (2001), Indianapolis, Indiana
- National Fallen Firefighters Memorial (1981), Emmitsburg, Maryland
- Firemen's Memorial (Boston) (1909), Boston, Massachusetts
- Upper Peninsula Firefighters Memorial Museum, at the historic Calumet Fire Station, Calumet, Michigan
- Firemen's Monument (Hoboken, New Jersey) (1891)
- Keansburg Firemen's Memorial Park (1938), Keansburg, New Jersey
- New York State Fallen Firefighters Memorial (1998), Albany, New York
- Firemen's Memorial (Manhattan) (1913), New York City, a monument on Riverside Drive at 100th Street in Manhattan
- Firefighters' Memorial Bridge (Pittston, Pennsylvania)
- Fireman's Drinking Fountain (1909), Slatington, Lehigh County, Pennsylvania
- Vigilant Fire Company Firemen's Monument, Washington Township, Pennsylvania, NRHP-listed
- Collyer Monument (1890), Pawtucket, Rhode Island, NRHP-listed.
- Fallen Firefighters Memorial (Wu), Seattle, Washington
- Peshtigo Fire Cemetery and the Peshtigo Fire Museum, commemorating victims of the 1871 fire, Peshtigo, Wisconsin
- Wisconsin State Firefighters Memorial (1996 or after), Wisconsin Rapids, Wisconsin

Nebraska Firefighter & EMS Memorial, Kearney, Nebraska

== Uruguay ==
- Plaza de los Treinta y Tres, Montevideo

== See also ==
- Women in firefighting
- Lists of monuments and memorials
- List of fire stations
- Category:Firefighting museums
