= Collyer Monument =

- U.S. National Register of Historic Places
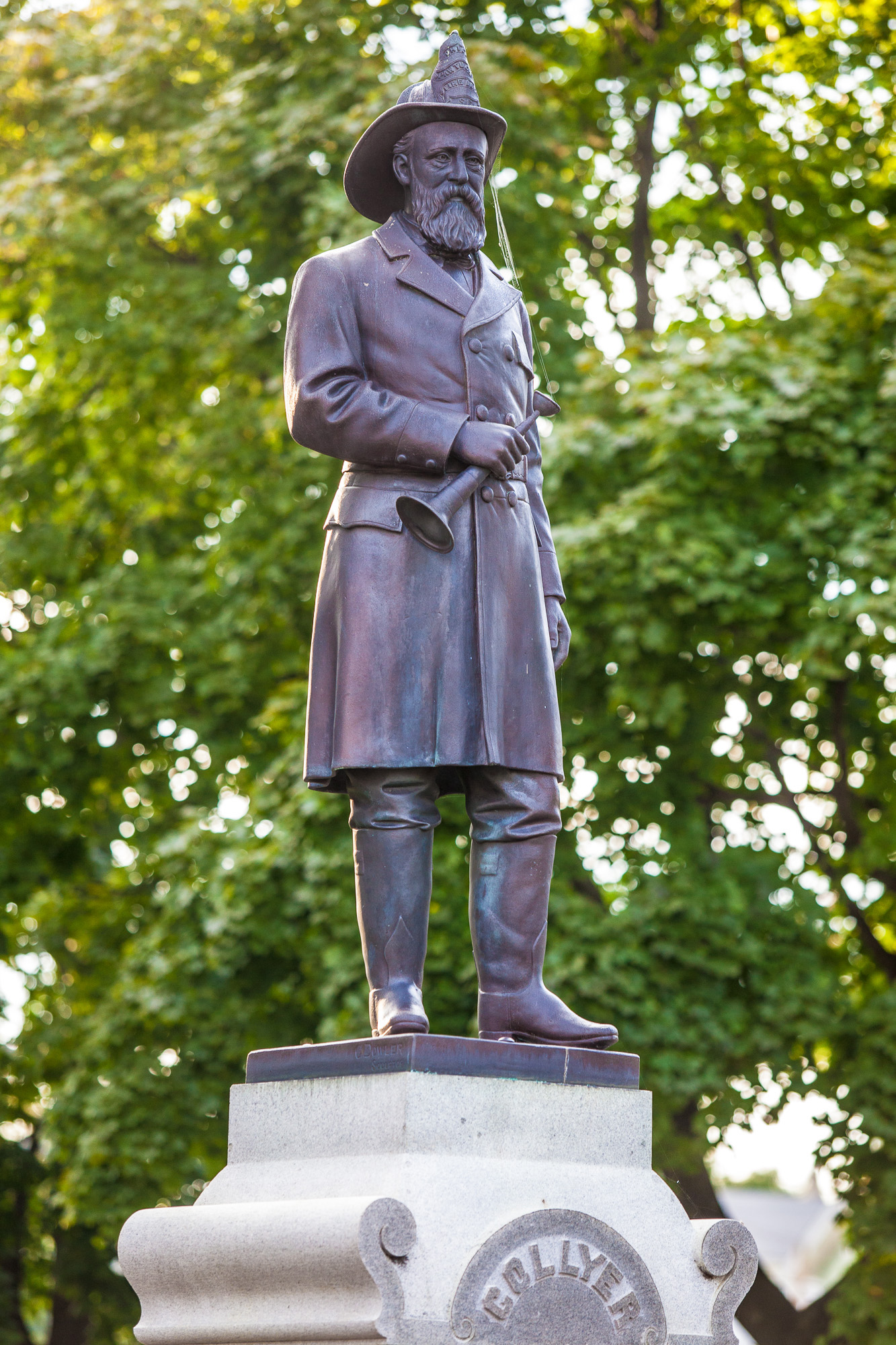
- The monument in 2012

- Location within Rhode Island Location within the United States
- Location: Pawtucket, Rhode Island
- Coordinates: 41°52′29″N 71°23′35″W
- Built: 1890
- Architects: Dowler, Charles
- MPS: Pawtucket MRA
- NRHP reference No.: 83003808
- Added to NRHP: November 18, 1983

Collyer Monument is a bronze sculpture built as a monument to firefighters in Mineral Spring Park in Pawtucket, Rhode Island, United States. The monument was erected in 1890 by the sculptor Charles Parker Dowler to honor Samuel Smith Collyer, a fallen Pawtucket Fire Chief. The life-size bronze sculpture stands atop a pedestal of Westerly granite, which has a bronze plaque depicting the fatal accident while the reverse bears an inscription. The memorial represents a significant example of monumental work of the period and an early example of local civic pride. The monument was added to the National Register of Historic Places in 1983. It is at the corner of Mineral Spring Avenue and Main Street.

== Samuel Collyer ==
Samuel Smith Collyer was born on May 3, 1832, in Pawtucket, Rhode Island. After his schooling, he took a job at the Pawtucket Post Office as a clerk and later was a store clerk in a shop. He became a machinist and worked for a period of about seven years before becoming a partner in his uncle, Nathan S. Collyer. When Nathan Collyer died in 1877, the business passed to his wife and then to Samuel Collyer upon her death in 1879. Collyer would maintain control of the business until his death and he would serve on the board of water commissioners in charge of the development of the Pawtucket Water Works. He also played an active role in local administration as a member of the Town Council of North Providence, serving as its president for a period of three years. From 1848 to his death, Collyer was connected to the fire departments of North Providence and Pawtucket, rising to the rank of Chief Engineer in 1874. In 1851, he married Ellen Whipple and they would later have one daughter, Mary Collyer.

The accident that would take the life of Samuel Collyer came in July 1884. While responding to a fire alarm, Hose Carriage #1, on which Chief Collyer was riding, struck an upright stone post on the corner on Mineral Spring and Lonsdale Avenue and tipped over. All six firefighters were injured in the accident, those less seriously were on the step and seat of the carriage, but Collyer who rode on the reel was crushed underneath. Collyer sustained a punctured lung and broken ribs, but managed to survive for almost three weeks before succumbing to his injuries. Contemporary accounts state that the funeral service and procession were the most elaborate of any in the town's history. Collyer's home, known as the Potter–Collyer House, was listed on the National Register of Historic Places in 1983.

== Design ==
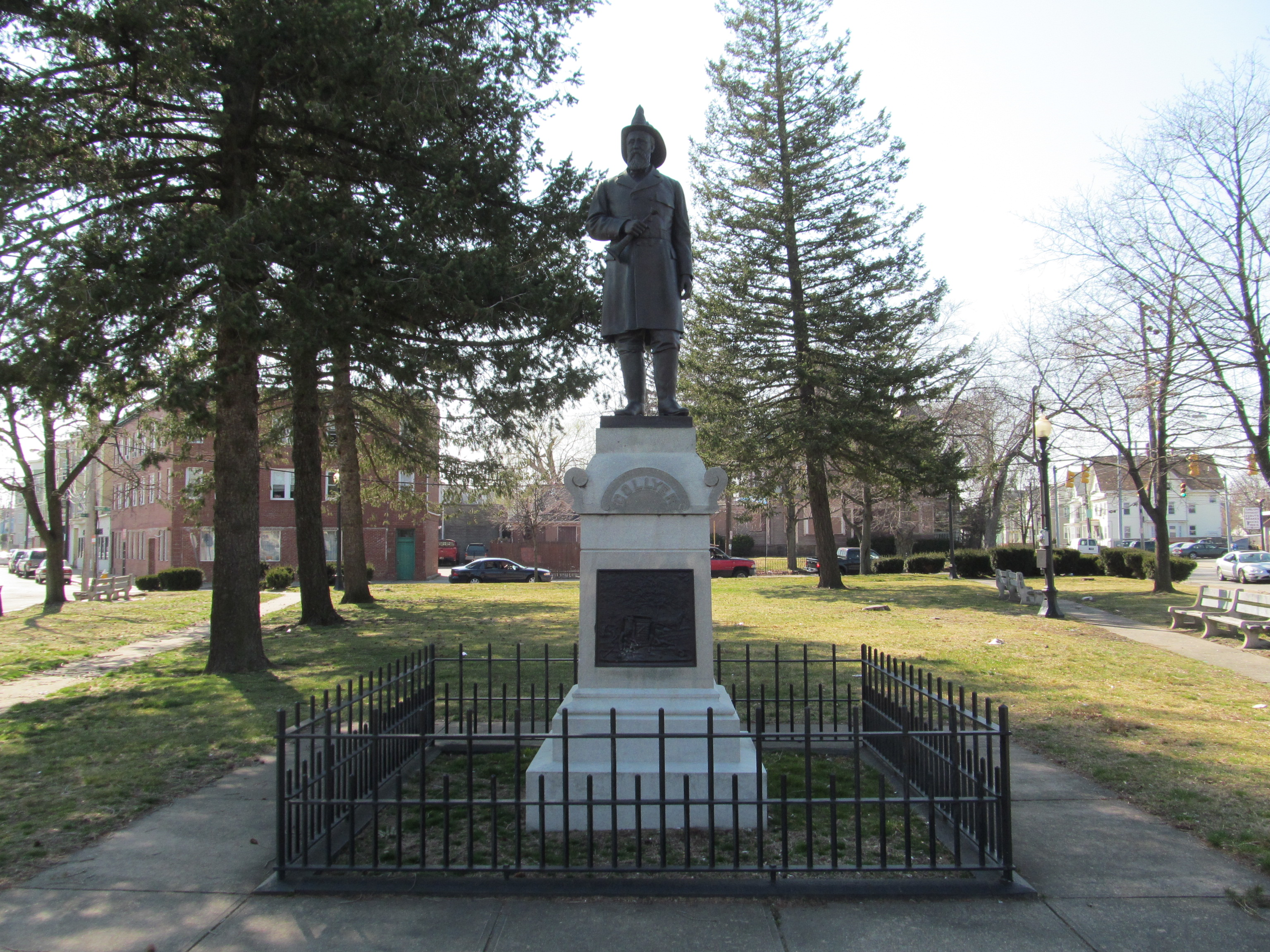
Full monument with fencing, 2012

The Collyer Monument was erected in 1890 by the citizens of Pawtucket for the cost of $2500. Noted sculptor Charles Dowler was commissioned to produce a life-size bronze of Collyer. Dowler sculpture measures 7 feet (2.1 m) high and 4.5 feet (1.4 m) wide and depicts Collyer in full firefighter's uniform with a trumpet in hand. The base is 4.5 feet (1.4 m) wide and 8 feet (2.4 m) tall and made of Westerly granite from Westerly, Rhode Island. A bronze plaque depicts the scene of the accident which claimed his life and his name is inscribed in an arch on the upper portion of the statue's base. The metal picket fence which encloses the statue was designed as part of the monument. On the reverse, the granite base contains the inscription commemorating Collyer who died in the line of duty. The inscription reads: Erected To The Memory / Of / Samuel S. Collyer / Who Died July 27, 1884 / While In The Discharge / Of His Duty As / Chief Engineer Of The / Pawtucket / Fire Department / Born May 3, 1832.

== Significance ==
The Collyer Monument is historically significant as an example of "the representational, statically monumental approach favored by most American sculptors in the last quarter of the nineteenth century." The monument is also one of the first-known civic sculptures in Pawtucket and serves as a representation of civic pride and artistry in memorializing a local who was held in utmost respect by its citizens. The dedication of this monument came on the concluding day of Pawtucket's Cotton Centenary Celebration in 1890 and was attended by Governor John W. Davis. The Collyer Monument was added to the National Register of Historic Places in 1983.

== See also ==
- List of firefighting monuments and memorials
- National Register of Historic Places listings in Rhode Island
- National Register of Historic Places listings in Pawtucket, Rhode Island
