= St. Maries 1910 Fire Memorial =

- U.S. National Register of Historic Places
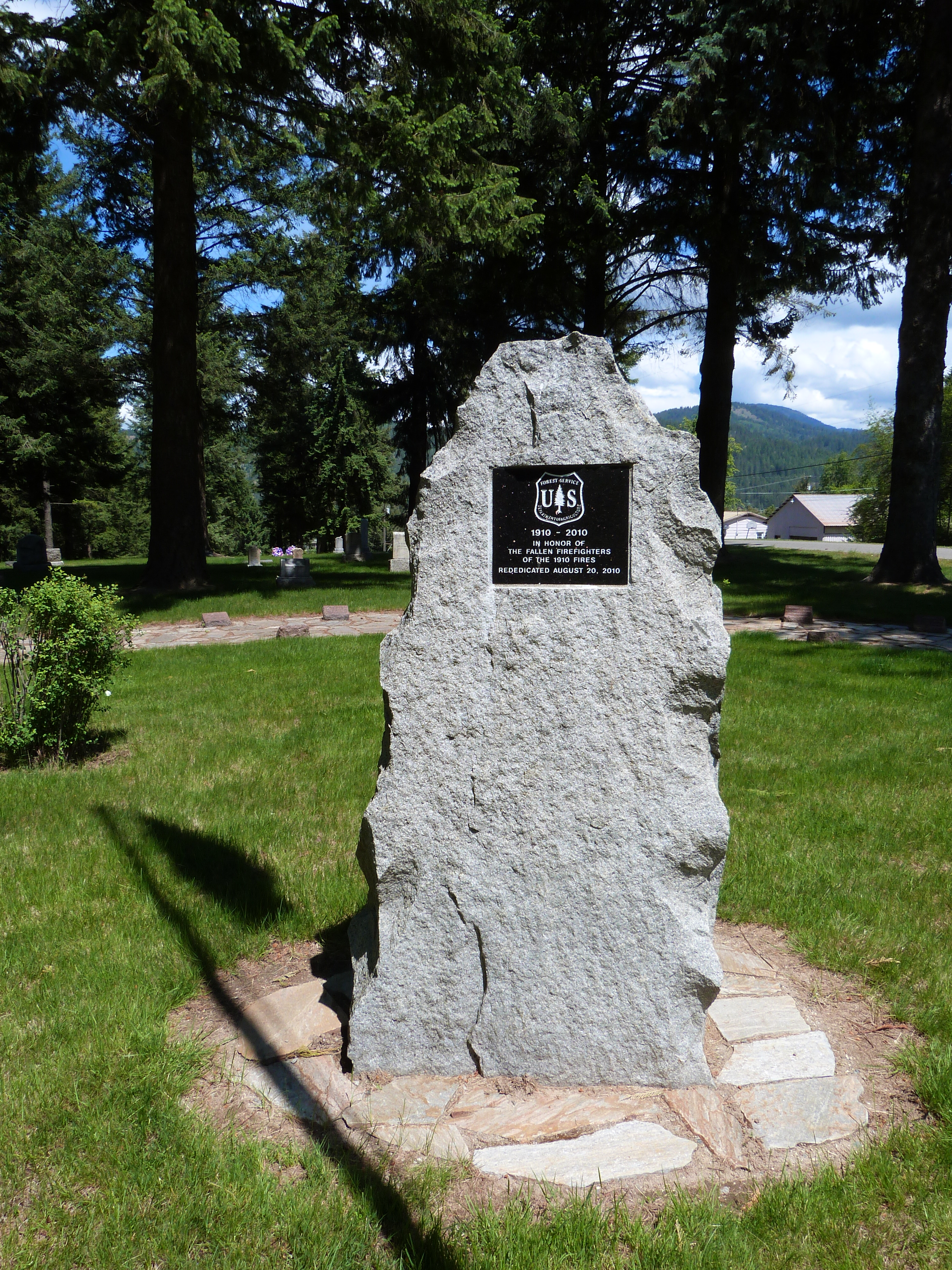

- Location within Idaho Location within the United States
- Location: St. Maries Cemetery, St. Maries, Idaho
- Coordinates: 47°18′56″N 116°35′12″W
- Area: 2.5 acres (1.0 ha)
- Built: 1910
- MPS: North Idaho 1910 Fire Sites TR
- NRHP reference No.: 84001010
- Added to NRHP: September 20, 1984

The St. Maries 1910 Fire Memorial, at St. Maries Cemetery in St. Maries, Idaho, was listed on the National Register of Historic Places in 1984.

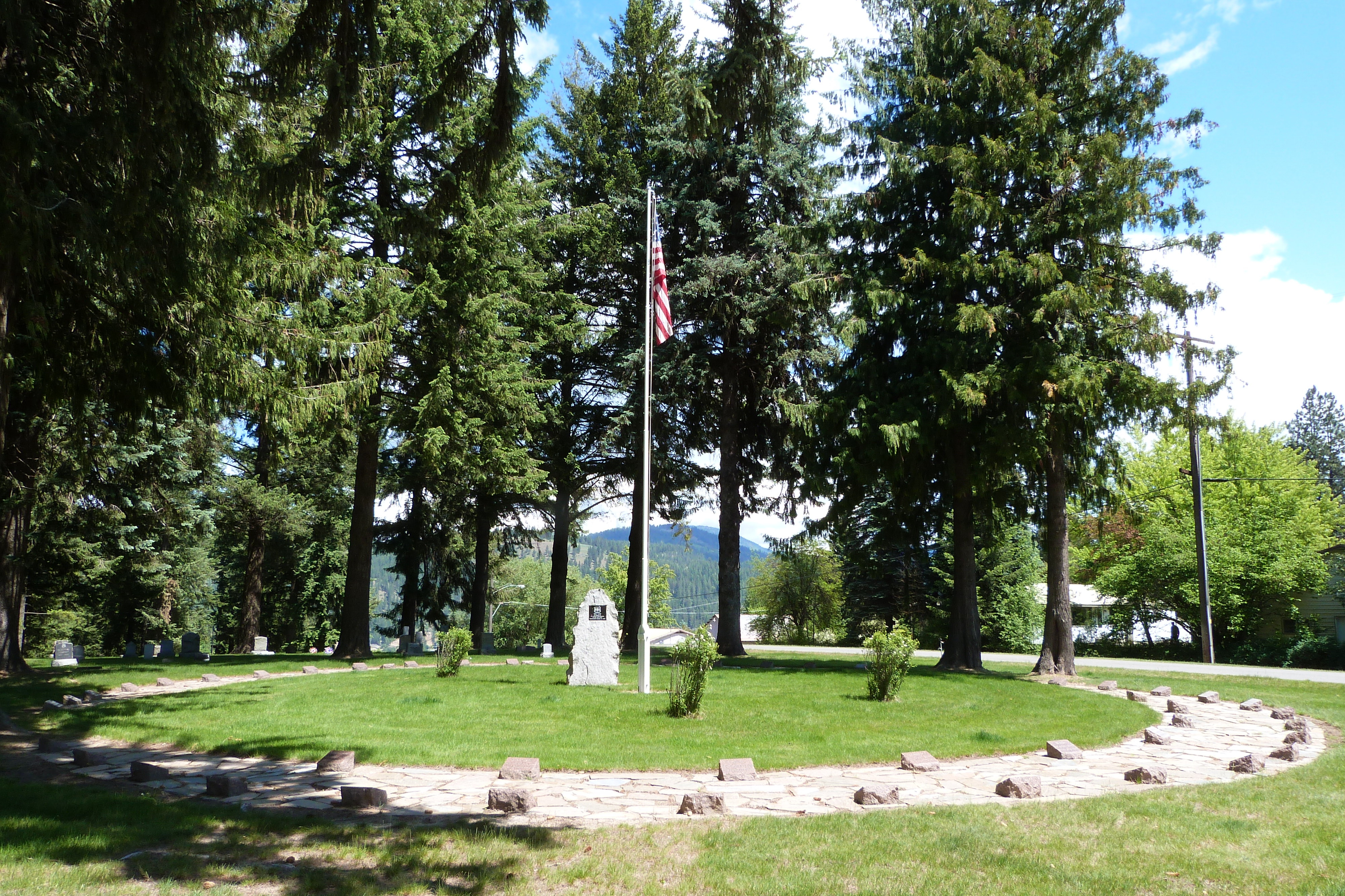

A six-foot granite slab memorial, with a 19 by 13 inches (0.48 m × 0.33 m) United States Forest Service bronze plate, was erected in 1924. The site includes graves of 54 fire fighters lost on August 20, 1910. Also 28 fire victims at Big Creek and 26 at Setzer Creek, killed in 1912, were reburied to the memorial.
