= New York State Fallen Firefighters Memorial =

Memorial in Albany, New York, U.S.

- New York State Fallen Frefighters Memorial, Albany
- Artist: Robert Eccleston
- Location: Albany, New York; 42.65096°N 73.75786°W

The New York State Fallen Firefighters Memorial in Albany, New York is dedicated to the New York firefighters who have died in the line of duty. Governor of New York George Pataki officially dedicated the memorial on October 5, 1998. It features a 54-foot (16 m) by 15-foot (4.6 m) gray granite wall, with 2,312 names permanently etched into the stone. In front of the wall stands a 10-foot (3.0 m) high dark bronze sculpture of two firefighters rescuing an injured colleague created by New York sculptor Robert Eccleston. The sculpture rests on a paved plaza with charcoal and red bricks forming a Maltese Cross. The Memorial stands on the northeast side of the Empire State Plaza in the park-like area bordered by Norway maples. It is easily accessible to the hundreds of thousand of visitors who travel to the New York State Capitol and Plaza each year.

The Fallen Firefighters Memorial Ceremony is held each year during national Fire Prevention Week.

== See also ==
- List of firefighting monuments and memorials
- National Fallen Firefighters Memorial
- IAFF Fallen Fire Fighters Memorial
