= Wisconsin State Firefighters Memorial =

Coordinates: 44°22′28.9″N 89°50′58.7″W

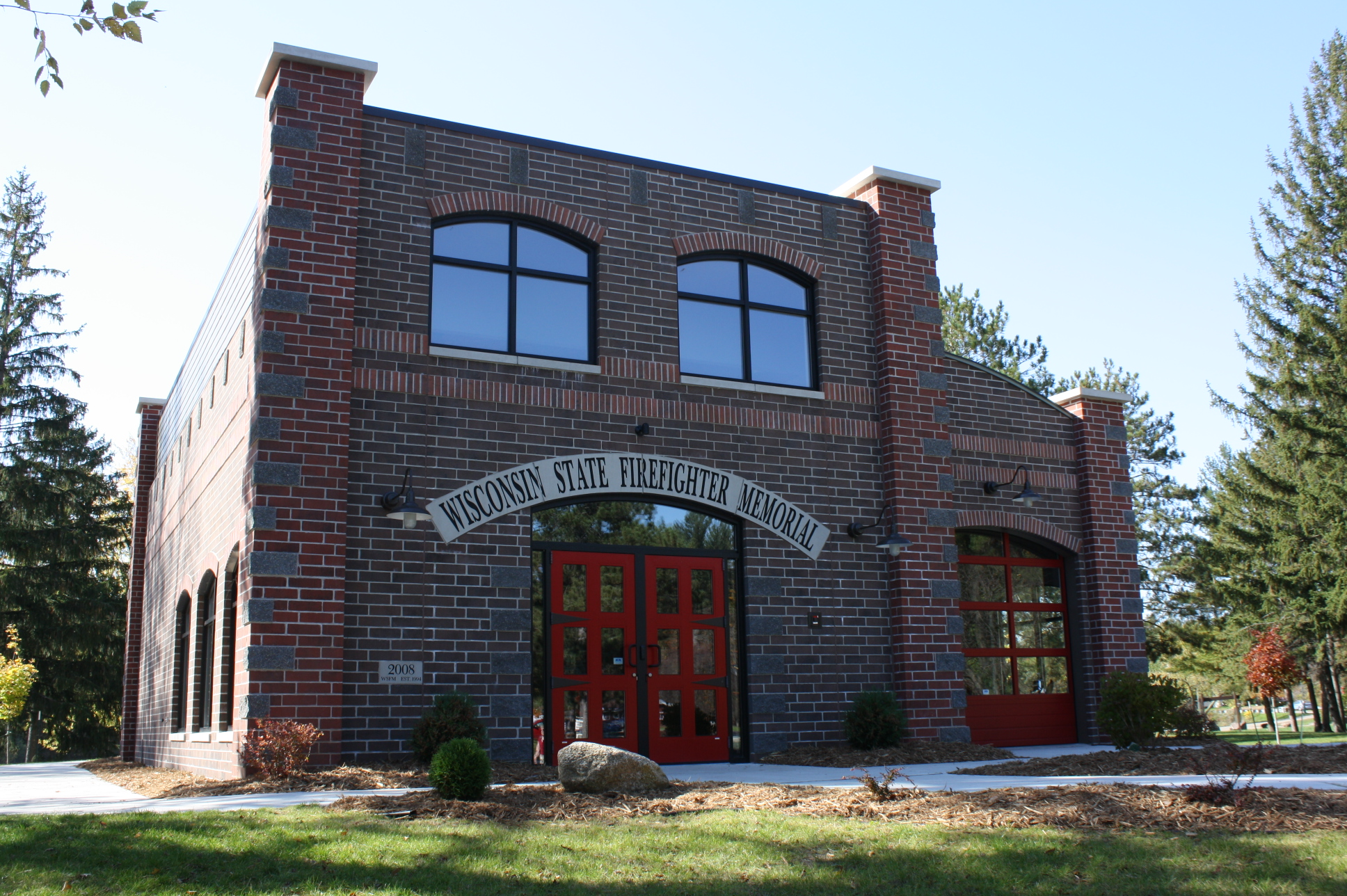
The Memorial

The Wisconsin State Firefighters Memorial is a non-profit memorial and park dedicated to firefighters from the state of Wisconsin who have died in the line of duty. It is located near Wisconsin Rapids.

== History ==
The memorial was signed into law in 1996 by Wisconsin Governor Tommy Thompson. It is funded completely by tax deductible donations and no tax money was used for its construction. On October 3, 2003, the Wisconsin Legislature designated the week in which October 8 falls as Fire Prevention week. The Saturday of that week is designated the Wisconsin State Firefighters Memorial Day; the week also commemorates the Peshtigo Fire and Great Chicago Fire from 1871.

== Location ==
It is located at Ben Hansen Park on Wisconsin Highway 54 / Wisconsin Highway 73 just south of Wisconsin Rapids, Wisconsin and north of Port Edwards, Wisconsin along the Wisconsin River. Locations considered for the memorial included Milwaukee (the state's largest population) and Madison; it was placed at Wisconsin Rapids to be near the center of the state for the easiest possible access for state residents.

== Memorial ==
The centerpiece of the park is a statue of three life-sized firefighters engaged in a rescue situation. One firefighter is dragging a disabled firefighter with another nearby ready to help. A memorial Final Alarm and Roll Call Ceremony is held each October to honor fallen firefighters in Wisconsin. There are benches for reflection and the American flag flies over the park. A tower with a firefighter's bell commemorates the bell that firefighters historically used to signal the beginning of a new shift and summon firefighters to an alarm and a fire call. The memorial has a smaller bronze statue that it brings to funerals for firefighters who died in the line of duty.

== Fundraising ==
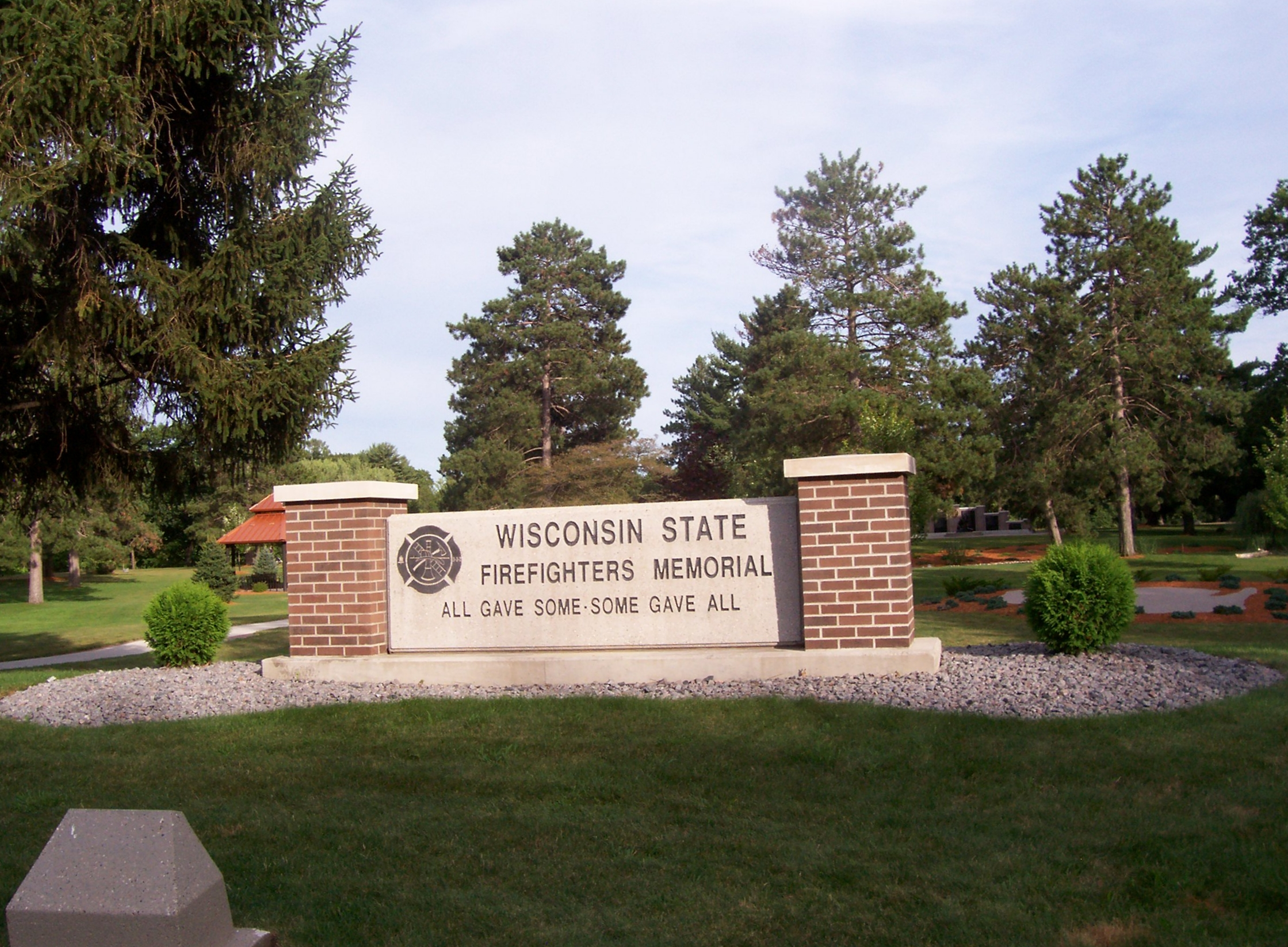
Sign at the Memorial

Governor Jim Doyle signed a bill that allows Wisconsin income tax filers to donate money to help fund the memorial. The group has held an annual motorcycle bike ride since 2004 to raise money for a planned visitor center and to raise money to maintain the center.

== See also ==
- List of firefighting monuments and memorials
