= National Fallen Firefighters Memorial =

United States national memorial

Coordinates: 39°41′42.05″N 77°19′32.78″W

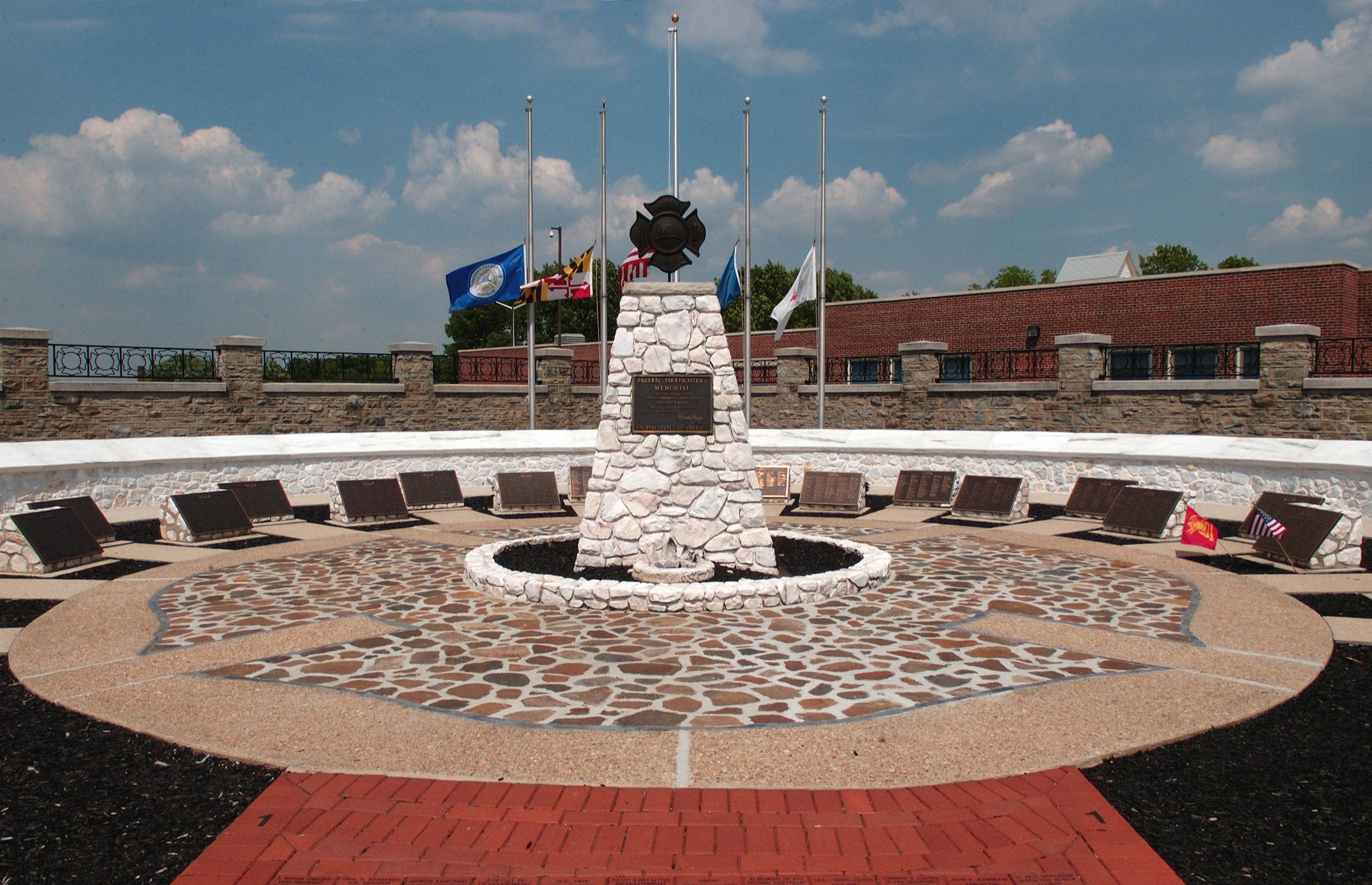

The National Fallen Firefighters Memorial is a memorial to career and volunteer firefighters who died in the line of duty. Located in Emmitsburg, Maryland, it was conceived as a tribute to American fire service. The memorial was constructed in 1981 on the campus of the National Fire Academy, and was designated a National Memorial by the United States Congress in 1990. Plaques listing the names of firefighters encircle the plaza. When a firefighter dies on duty, local fire officials notify the United States Fire Administration and a notice is immediately posted on the memorial grounds. The flags over the memorial are flown at half-staff in honor of the fallen firefighter. If some criteria are met, the fallen firefighter is honored at the annual memorial service. The memorial is open to the public throughout the year.

On October 16, 2001, President George W. Bush approved legislation requiring the United States flag to be lowered to half-staff on all federal buildings to memorialize fallen firefighters. Public Law 107-51 requires this action to occur annually in conjunction with observance of the National Fallen Firefighters Memorial Service. The dates of the National Fallen Firefighters Memorial Weekend is now the first weekend in May as of 2023. A candlelight vigil service is held the night before the National Fallen Firefighters Memorial Service. Both services are held at the National Fallen Firefighters Memorial. These services memorialize fallen firefighters from around the nation.

== See also ==
- List of firefighting monuments and memorials
- List of national memorials of the United States
- New York State Fallen Firefighters Memorial
- IAFF Fallen Fire Fighters Memorial
