= John Forbes Hogan =

American architect (1894–1967)

- Born: January 7, 1894; Pawtucket, Rhode Island
- Died: February 16, 1967 (aged 73); Pawtucket, Rhode Island
- Occupation: Architect

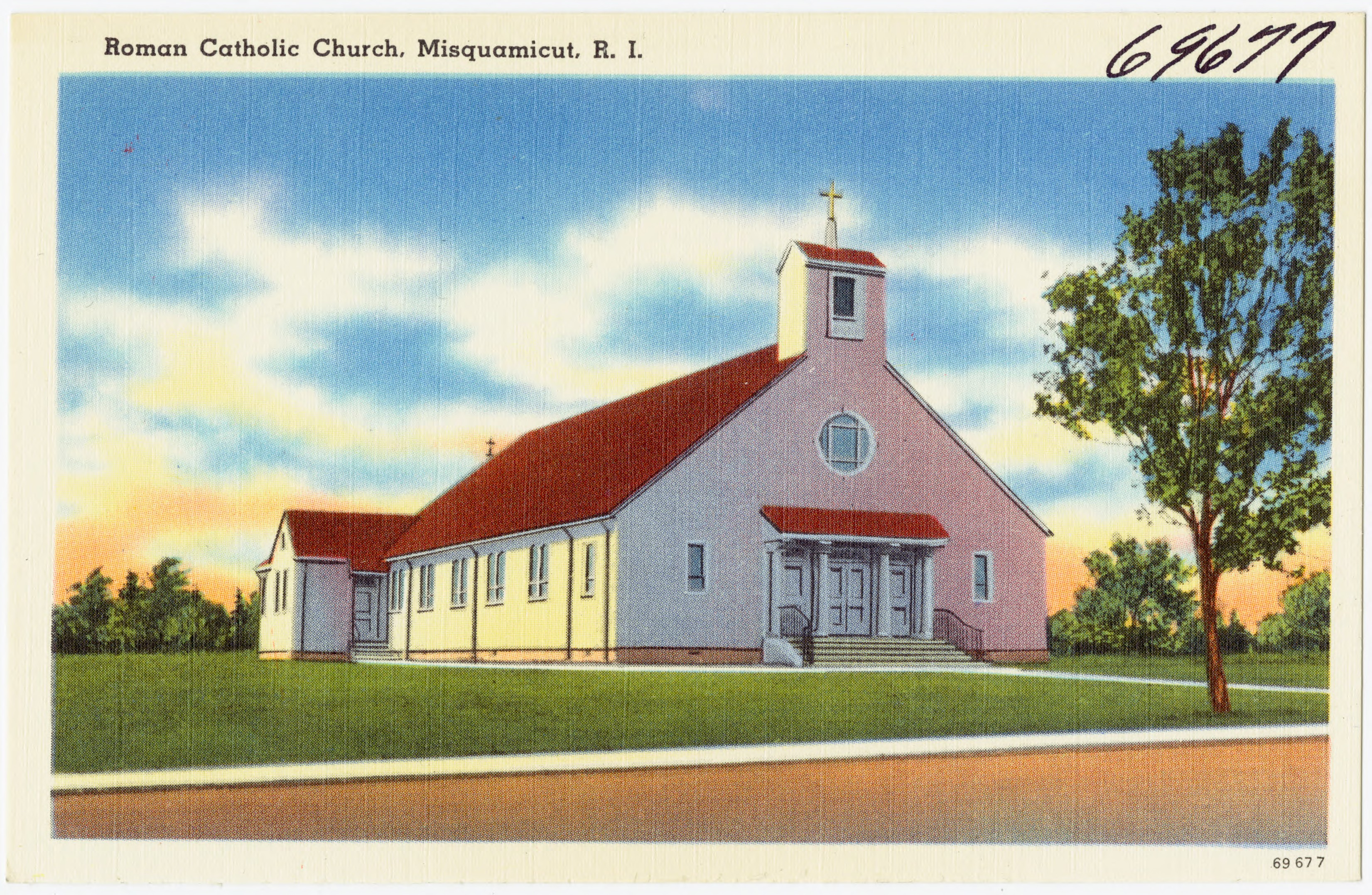
St. Clare Church, Misquamicut, 1940.

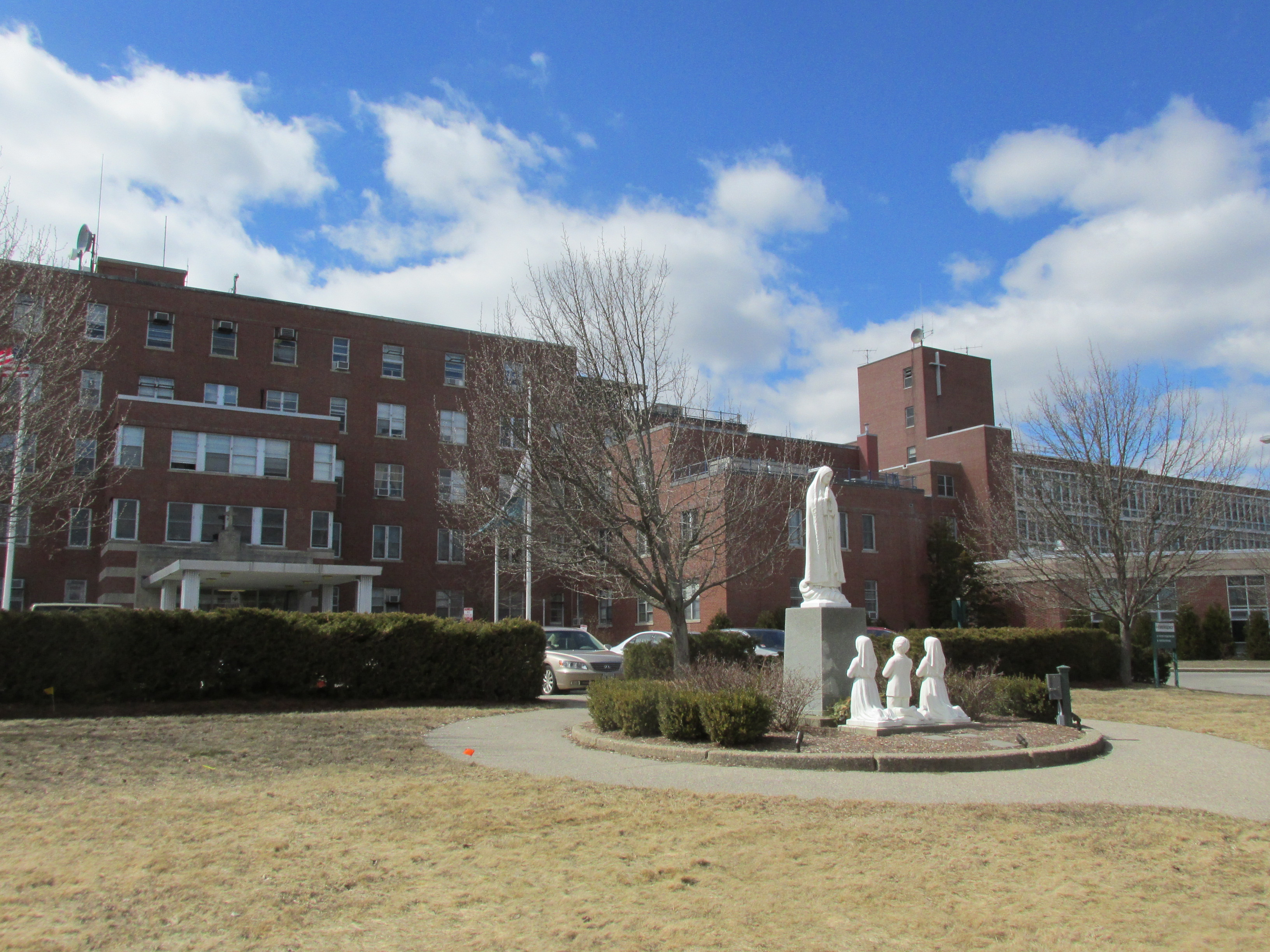
Our Lady of Fatima Hospital, North Providence, 1954.

John Forbes Hogan (January 7, 1894 – February 16, 1967) was an American architect from Providence, Rhode Island.

Hogan was born to Mary Josephine Forbes and Thomas Sebastian Hogan in Pawtucket in 1894. In 1916 he earned a B.S. from the Massachusetts Institute of Technology, and an M.S. the following year. For 10 months after his latter graduation he traveled in Europe. From 1919 to 1923 he was employed as a designer in the Providence office of architect George Frederic Hall. In 1923 he left Hall to open his own office in Providence. He joined the AIA in 1924.

Hogan specialized in buildings for the Catholic church, designing many churches and institutions for the diocese.

== Works ==
Churches (Roman Catholic):

- 1925 - St. Anthony, 32 Lawn Ave, Pawtucket, Rhode Island
- 1932 - St. Mary, 437 Carolina Back Rd, Carolina, Rhode Island
- 1935 - St. Casimir, 350 Smith St, Providence, Rhode Island
- 1935 - St. Joseph, 183 Sayles Ave, Pascoag, Rhode Island
- 1937 - St. Mary (Remodeling), 12 William St, Newport, Rhode Island
- 1939 - St. Joseph, 1105 Main St, Hope Valley, Rhode Island
- 1939 - St. Teresa, 358 Newport Ave, Pawtucket, Rhode Island
- 1940 - St. Clare, 4 St Clares Way, Misquamicut, Rhode Island
- 1940 - St. Edward, 396 Weeden St, Pawtucket, Rhode Island
- 1947 - Our Lady of Victory, 169 Main St, Ashaway, Rhode Island

Other religious commissions:

- 1928 - St. Patrick School, 244 Smith St, Providence, Rhode Island
- 1928 - St. Pius School, 49 Elmhurst Ave, Providence, Rhode Island
- 1932 - St. Francis House, 167 Blackstone St, Woonsocket, Rhode Island
- 1939 - St. Mary Convent, 530 Broadway, Providence, Rhode Island
- 1948 - Albertus Magnus Hall, Providence College, Providence, Rhode Island
- 1954 - Our Lady of Fatima Hospital, 200 High Service Ave, North Providence, Rhode Island

Secular work:

- 1936 - Elizabeth Barry Hall, Rhode Island State Hospital for Mental Diseases, Howard, Rhode Island
- 1953 - Pastore Hall, University of Rhode Island, Kingston, Rhode Island
- 1955 - Adams Residence Hall, University of Rhode Island, Kingston, Rhode Island
- 1957 - Wales and Kelley Halls, University of Rhode Island, Kingston, Rhode Island
