= Newport Hospital =

Hospital in Rhode Island, US

- Brown University Health
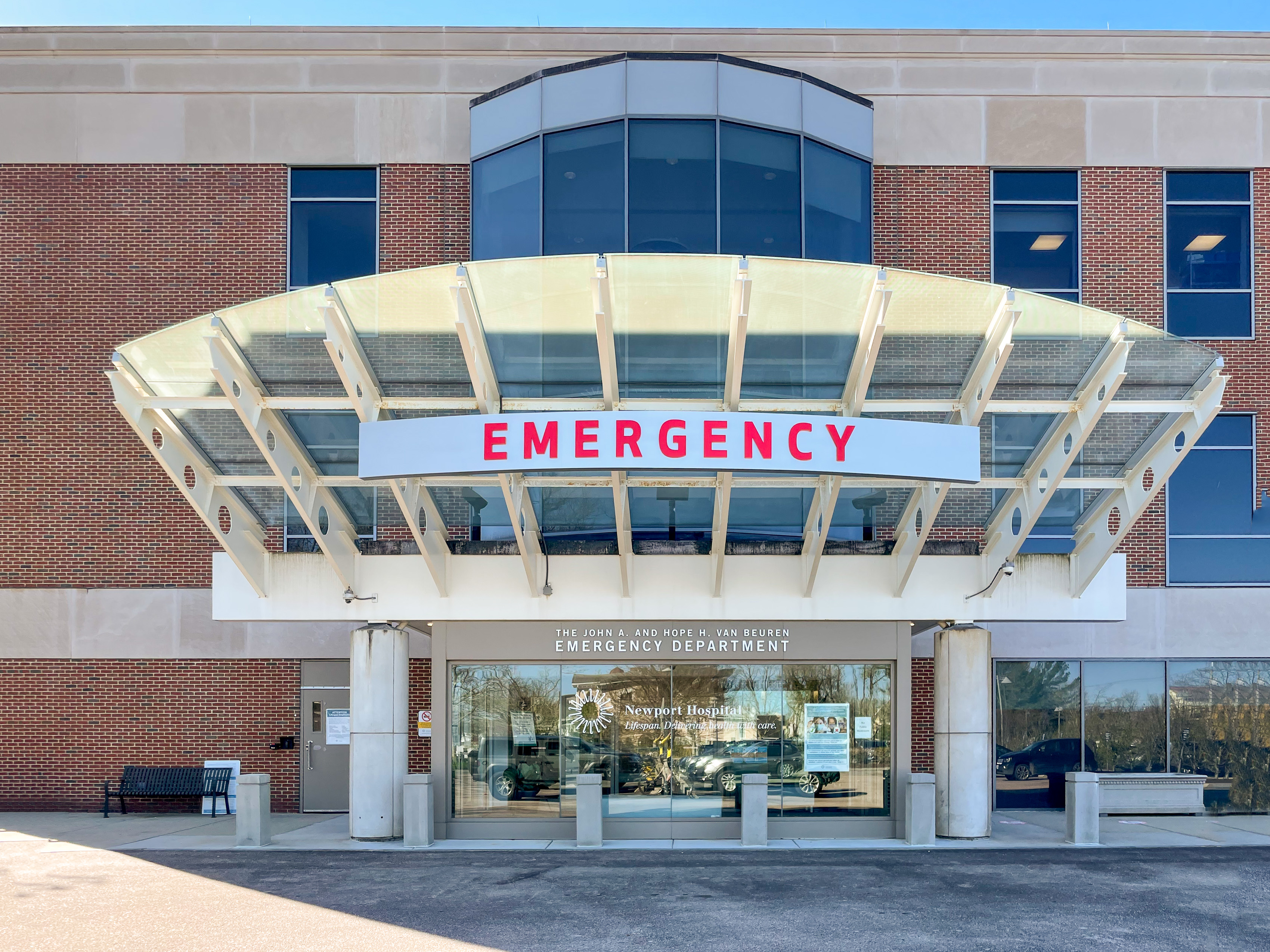
- Emergency entrance

Geography
- Location: Newport, Rhode Island, United States
- Coordinates: 41.49724°N 71.30625°W

Organization
- Care system: Private

Services
- Emergency department: Yes

History
- Founded: 1873

Links
- Website: www.brownhealth.org/locations/newport-hospital
- Lists: Hospitals in Rhode Island

Newport Hospital is a private, nonprofit hospital located in Newport, Rhode Island. Together with The Miriam Hospital and Rhode Island Hospital, Newport Hospital is a member of the Brown University Health system.

== History ==
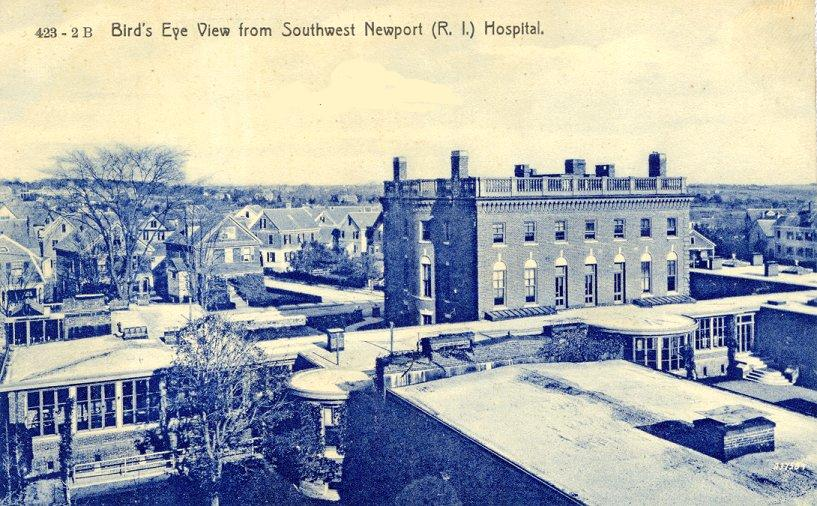
Newport Hospital at the turn of the 20th century

Newport Hospital was founded in 1873 to provide better medical access to residents of Aquidneck Island, including the many mariners who previously travelled to Providence for treatment, an especially hazardous journey in the winter. Henry Ledyard served as the first president and co-founder of the hospital. Initially, the hospital was supported solely with private donations including the land upon which the first hospital, a small cottage, was built. Longtime Newport resident, George Peabody Wetmore, played a large role in building a new hospital building in the late nineteenth century.

In 1903 Alice Vanderbilt, a Newport summer resident, donated a facility to the hospital in honor of her husband Cornelius Vanderbilt II, which is currently called the Vanderbilt Rehabilitation Center. Upon her death in 1978, Gertrude Conaway Vanderbilt, Harold Stirling Vanderbilt's widow, bequeathed $1 million to the hospital.

In 2000 another new wing opened at the hospital. The Hospital partners with the Naval Station Newport in offering services to the military. Newport Hospital currently offers various services "including emergency care, diagnostic imaging, a birthing center, behavioral health unit, comprehensive surgical services, intensive care, acute inpatient and outpatient rehabilitation."

== See also ==
- List of hospitals in Rhode Island
