= Charles Bradley (medical doctor) =

American psychiatrist (1902–1979)

Charles Bradley (December 1, 1902 – May 31, 1979) was an American physician, child psychiatrist and professor who is notable for the serendipitous discovery that the use of Benzedrine in children with certain behavioral problems results in improvement of academic performance. His work prompted later investigations into the subject that eventually led to the current pharmaceutical use of stimulant medication in treatment of ADHD.

== Early life and education ==
Born into the Bradley family, Charles was a grand-nephew of George Bradley. The family is notable due to George Bradley's and his wife's, Helen Bradley's, last will that lead to the establishment of Emma Pendleton Bradley hospital, the first American children's psychiatric hospital, named after George's and Helen's terminally ill daughter.

Charles grew up in Providence, Rhode Island along with his two brothers, Horatio Hunt Bradley and George Lothrop Bradley. His father of the same namesake, Charles Bradley, lead a successful career at a Pittsburgh office of the Bell Telephone Company where he eventually became a superintendent. His mother, Helen Nancy Hunt Bradley, owned a bookstore, but some time after she became a widow in 1910, when Charles's father suddenly died of sepsis following a hand injury at the age of 33, she became unemployed.

Bradley would later complete his medical studies at a Philadelphia hospital where he earned an M.D. degree and eventually, in 1930, Bradley married the scientific researcher Helen Katherine Teale with whom he would have 2 children, Charles Bradley Jr. and Marcy Bradley.

== Medical career and later life ==
In 1932, just a year after the Bradley hospital was created, Charles was hired by the hospitals director, Arthur Ruggles, at least partly because of Charles' recognizable name. Ruggles pushed Bradley to pursue neurology and pediatrics instead of physical education and a year later, in 1933, Charles became the hospitals second ever director. In 1943, after the previous hospitals superintendent went into retirement, Charles replaced the vacant position and was responsible for the change of hospital dresscode. On April 9th, 1948, Bradley left the hospital and joined the Oregon Medical School as a professor where he founded, and was a director of, the child psychiatry department.

During his life, Bradley wrote extensively on childhood schizophrenia and was a leader in the use of residential treatment for children with behavioral problems.

In 1979 Bradley died in Washington, his wife surviving him until the 4th of December 1993.

== Research ==
Charles Bradley was credited with the invention of "Air encephalography" which made pneumoencephalographical images sharper by drawing out Cerebrospinal fluid and replacing it with air. Bradley also made x-ray neuroimaging easier to perform by designing a small child-sized chair specifically for the procedures.

=== Amphetamine research ===
While Bradley was employed at Bradley hospital, he conducted extensive neurological workups on the patients, a part of these workups was pneumoencephalography. This procedure often lead to severe headaches that Dr. Bradley assumed, resulted from the loss of Cerebrospinal fluid. In an attempt to stimulate the choroid plexus and produce more of the fluid Bradley prescribed Benzedrine, a brand name for Amphetamine sold as an inhaler. It was then noted by the teachers and nurses who cared for the children, and Bradley himself, that the patients who had received Benzedrine showed an improvement in academic performance and a general decrease of "rowdiness" and aggression. This was apparent even to the children, who began to call the medication “arithmetic pills” as a result of the improvement of their academic performance. Following these events Dr. Bradley published several works regarding the behavioral effects of Benzedrine in well known journals receiving moderate recognition, however it took 25 years before anyone made attempts to replicate his results and another 25 before amphetamine became readily available for treatment.
