= Project Weber/RENEW =

Harm reduction organization in Rhode Island, United States

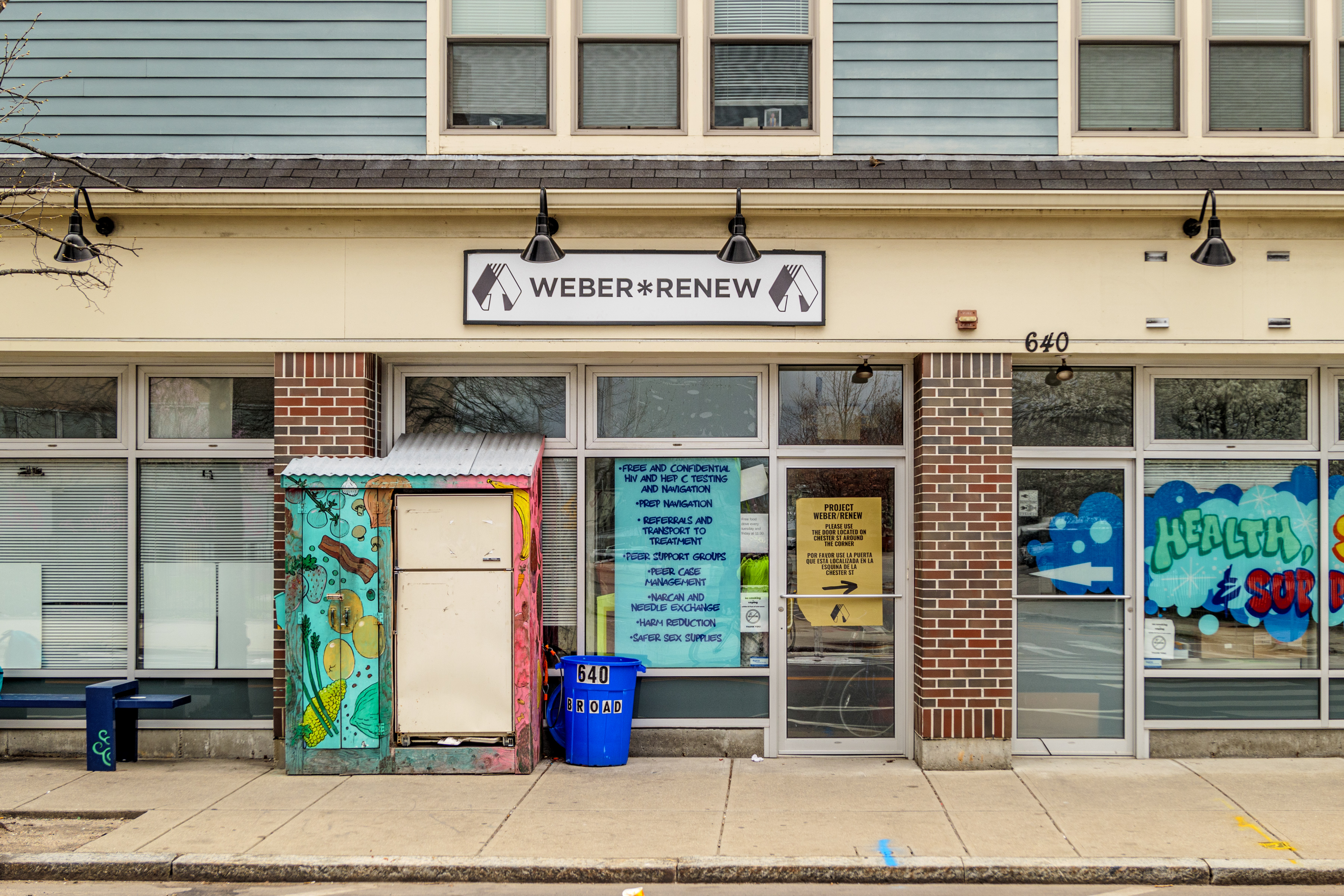
- Office at 640 Broad Street in Providence
- Formation: 2016
- Founder: Rich Holcomb and James Waterman
- Type: 501(c)(3)
- Location: Providence, Rhode Island
- Services: harm-reduction and recovery
- Executive Director: Colleen Ndoye
- Website: weberrenew.org

Project Weber/RENEW is a harm reduction organization in Providence, Rhode Island, established in 2016 by the merger of Project RENEW and Project Weber. The organization is staffed entirely by people who have directly experienced mental health issues, substance abuse and/or sex work. It has been operating a supervised drug consumption site since January 2025.

== History ==
=== Creation of Project RENEW ===
In 2006, Colleen Daley Ndoye started Project Revitalizing & Engaging Neighborhoods by Empowering Women (RENEW), which connects women sex workers with social services and substance abuse treatment. Project RENEW has been credited with reducing arrests in Pawtucket.

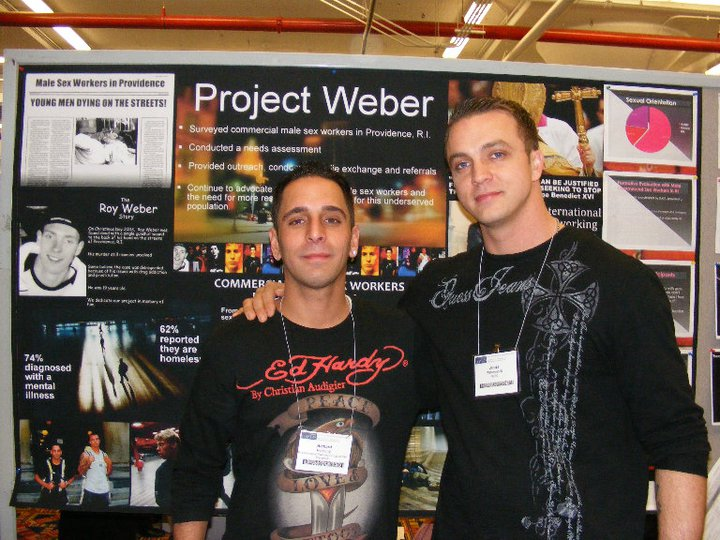
Rich Holcomb and James Waterman displaying the Project Weber poster at the 2010 HIV Prevention Summit in Washington DC.

=== Creation of Project Weber ===
In 2008, Project Weber was founded by Rich Holcomb and James Waterman, in Providence, as the first supportive services in America to exclusively serve male sex workers. The project was named in honor of Roy Weber, a sex worker who was found murdered in Providence in 2003. Project Weber opened its first drop-in center in 2013. After two years of running the drop-in center and nearly seven years of complete abstinence from drugs and alcohol, Holcomb relapsed and resigned as director of Project Weber. The merger into Project Weber/RENEW occurred, in part, to sustain the work of Project Weber, after Holcomb's departure as director. Holcomb continues to be involved in the organization.

=== Merger into Project Weber/RENEW ===
In 2016, Project Weber which served male sex workers and Project RENEW which served female sex workers merged to become Project Weber/RENEW in a hope to gather more funds and help more people. Project Weber/RENEW is funded by the Rhode Island Department of Health. Weber/RENEW's interventions include education, distribution of harm reduction supplies, peer-led street outreach, addressing basic needs, HIV prevention testing, support groups, and case management.

== Services ==
In 2021, Weber/RENEW began handing out harm reduction supplies in Kennedy Plaza. The organization runs two drop-in centers run by workers in recovery. One in Providence and another in Pawtucket. Additionally, the organization runs a mobile outreach van in Providence, Central Falls, and Pawtucket.

It is one of the largest distributors of Narcan in the state.

== Work ==
=== COVID-19 pandemic response ===
In 2020 and 2021, Weber/RENEW was one of the only organizations in Rhode Island to continue in person harm reduction and outreach work, despite the risk of transmission at the beginning of the COVID-19 pandemic. In response to the pandemic, the organization expanded services to meet clients' basic needs. Weber/RENEW also started distributing COVID masks and cleaning supplies, hosting vaccination clinics, and sharing educational information about COVID and vaccines.

=== Supervised injection sites ===
In July 2022, Rhode Island became the first state in America to legalize supervised drug consumption sites.

In February 2024 the Providence City Council approved the establishment of the state's first supervised injection site, to be operated by Project Weber/RENEW and VICTA, a privately owned behavioral health organization. The site is to be located next to the campus of Rhode Island Hospital.

It opened up a supervised drug consumption site in a former medical building in January 2025. This is one of the three such sites in the United States

=== Outreach in Kennedy Plaza ===
Project Weber/RENEW focuses much of their outreach on the Rhode Island Public Transit Authority (RIPTA) bus terminal, Kennedy Plaza. Kennedy Plaza has one of the highest rates of overdoses in Providence.

=== Awarded grants ===
In 2018, Miriam Hospital received a $2.5 million federal grant to partner with Project Weber/RENEW and the Rhode Island Public Health Institute to create Rhode Island's first substance use treatment program for gay and bisexual, Black and Latino men. In 2018, Project Weber/RENEW was awarded $10,000 from the Rhode Island Foundation for advocacy and training, as well as to connect high-risk transgender men and women with health and prevention services.

=== PrideFest honor ===
In June 2022, Project Weber/RENEW was named Grand Marshals for the return of PrideFest and the Illuminated Night Parade in Providence.
