= Oakland Grove Health Care Center =

Coordinates: 41.998552°N 71.489429°W

Geography
- Location: Woonsocket, Rhode Island, United States

Organization
- Care system: Private

Links
- Website: http://www.athenahealthcare.com/ri-og.htm
- Lists: Hospitals in Rhode Island

Oakland Grove Health Care Center is a health care center in Woonsocket, Rhode Island.

== See also ==
- List of hospitals in Rhode Island
