= Saint Joseph's Hospital (Rhode Island) =

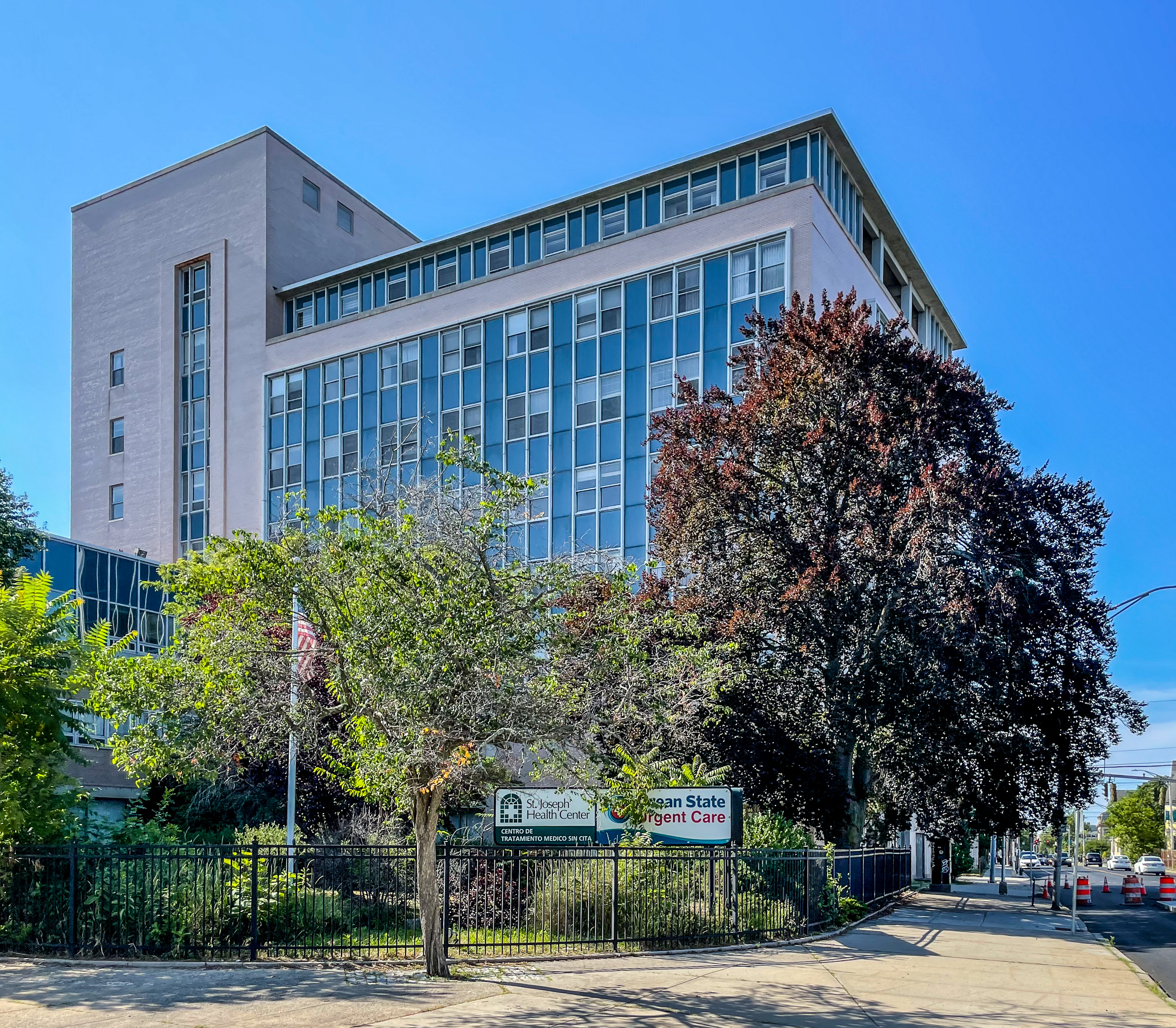

Geography
- Location: Broad Street and Peace Street, Providence, Rhode Island, United States
- Coordinates: 41.8066775259931°N 71.42166734559159°W

Organization
- Care system: Private

Services
- Emergency department: No

History
- Opened: 1892

Links
- Website: http://www.fatimahospital.com/
- Lists: Hospitals in Rhode Island

Saint Joseph's Hospital is a non-profit hospital in Providence, Rhode Island, which opened on April 6, 1892. The hospital is sponsored by the Roman Catholic Diocese of Providence. The Diocese merged St. Joseph and Our Lady of Fatima Hospital in the early 1970s.

== See also ==
- List of hospitals in Rhode Island
