= St. Mary's Church (Newport, Rhode Island) =

Historic church in Rhode Island, United States

- St. Mary's Church Complex
- U.S. National Register of Historic Places
- U.S. Historic district – Contributing property
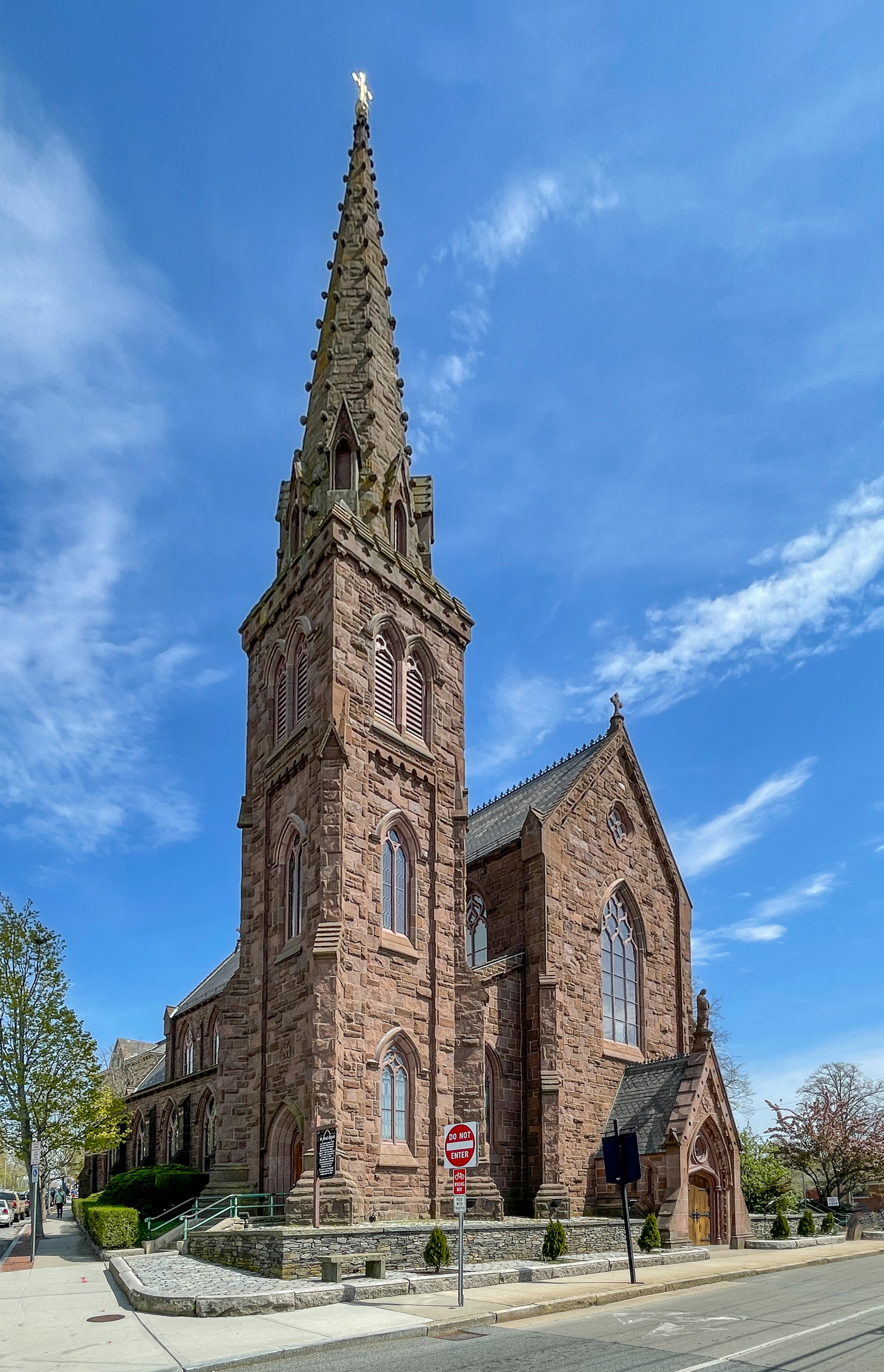

- Location within Rhode Island Location within the United States
- Location: 14 William Street, Newport, Rhode Island
- Coordinates: 41°29′2″N 71°18′45″W
- Area: 0.8 acres (0.32 ha)
- Built: 1848
- Architect: Patrick C. Keely; Dudley Newton; Ambrose J. Murphy; John F. Hogan; Milton R. Kenyon
- Architectural style: Gothic Revival
- Part of: Southern Thames Historic District (ID08000314)
- NRHP reference No.: 08000153

Significant dates
- Added to NRHP: March 06, 2008
- Designated CP: June 26, 2008

St. Mary's Church, officially the Church of the Holy Name of Mary, Our Lady of the Isle, is a historic Catholic parish church complex at 14 William Street, the corner of Spring Street and Memorial Boulevard, in Newport, Rhode Island within the Diocese of Providence. It is the church of the oldest Catholic parish in the state. The church is also notable for hosting the wedding of Jacqueline Bouvier and Senator, later President, John F. Kennedy in 1953.

== Buildings ==
Three buildings comprise the complex: the brownstone Gothic Revival parish church; the parish house, formerly a school; and a convent. The church was built in 1848–52 to the design of renowned Brooklyn architect Patrick C. Keely. The engineer for its construction was US Army Lieutenant William S. Rosecrans, who would rise to the rank of Major General in the American Civil War. "On June 14, 1849, Bishop Bernard O'Reilly consecrated the building, committing it to the patronage of the Holy Name of Mary, Our Lady of the Isle."

In 1865 the school was built directly east of the church, and also was designed by Keely. During the 1880s, the church erected two more buildings, neither of which were included in the nomination for the National Register of Historic Places. A convent was built in 1880–81, designed by local architect Dudley Newton. In 1991 that building was moved from its site at Spring and Gidley Streets to its current location at 398 Thames Street, where it serves as the Admiral Fitzroy Inn. In 1886 Dudley also designed the rectory that burned in 1921. A new rectory, designed by Ambrose J. Murphy, was erected on the same site in 1924–5. In 1937 architect John F. Hogan altered both the church and school. In 1967, after the Second Vatican Council, East Providence architect Milton R. Kenyon further altered the church.

== History ==
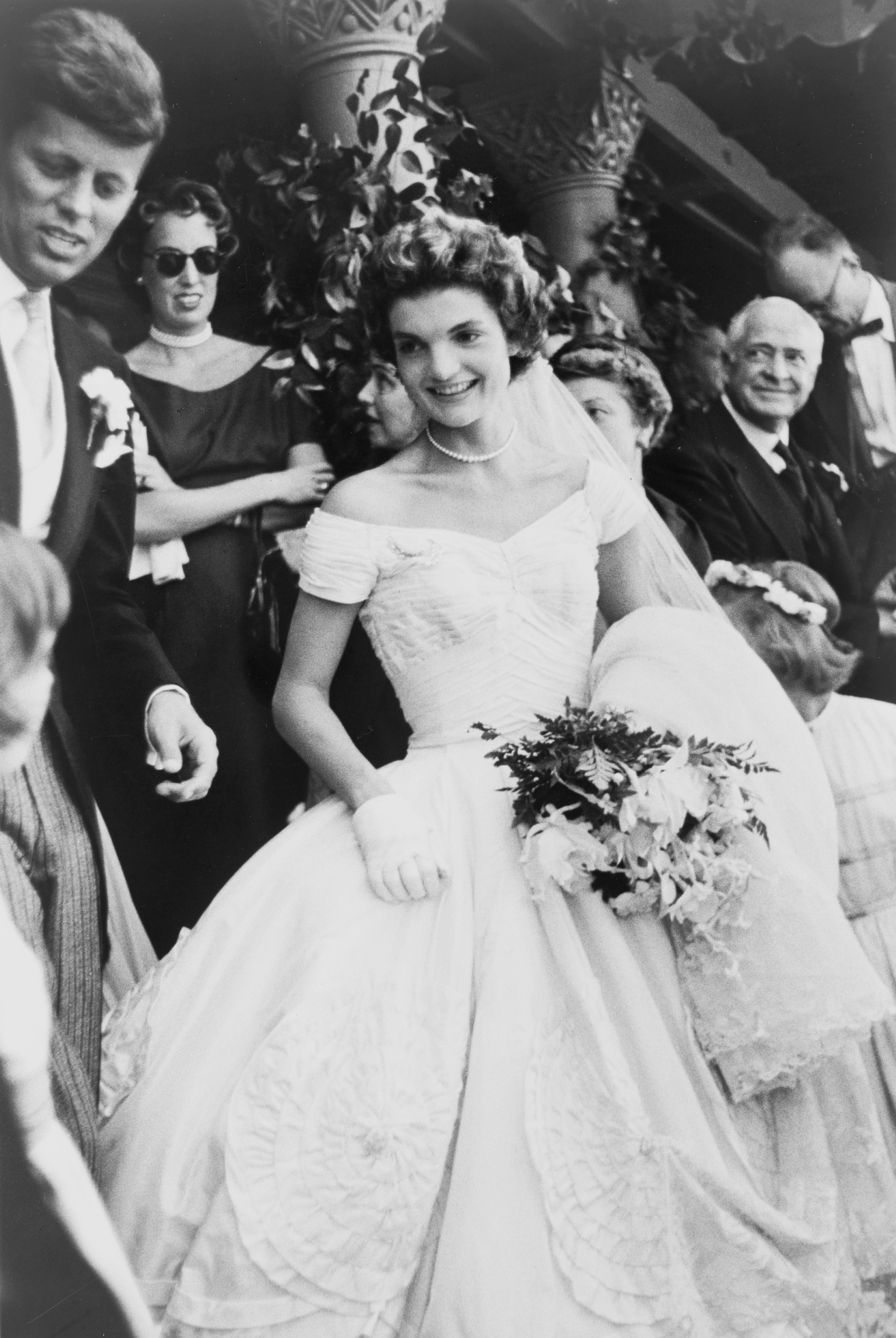
The Kennedys married in St. Mary's Church on September 12, 1953

The Catholic parish congregation was founded in 1828, and was the first established in the state.

Jacqueline Bouvier and Senator John F. Kennedy worshiped at pew number ten of the present church during their visits in Newport. The two married at St. Mary's on September 12, 1953, presided by Archbishop Richard Cushing and attended by more than 800 invited guests. A massive crowd of well-wishers filled the streets surrounding the church. In 2017 the church held a special series of tours and programs to commemorate the wedding and to raise funds to restore the choir gallery and its historic organ.

The church was added to the National Register of Historic Places in 2008.

Cranston Mayor Allan Fung married Barbara Ann Fenton, a native of Newport, on June 18, 2016, with about 200 guests in attendance, in the church. The ceremony incorporated elements honoring both the bride's Irish heritage and the groom's Chinese heritage. Fenton was a parishioner of the church, and Fung converted to Catholicism before their wedding.

== See also ==
- Catholic Church in the United States
- Roman Catholic Diocese of Providence
- Catholic parish church
- Index of Catholic Church articles
- National Register of Historic Places listings in Newport County, Rhode Island
- Pastoral care
