= Smith Hill, Providence, Rhode Island =

Coordinates: 41.8339°N 71.4223°W

- Smith Hill Historic District
- U.S. National Register of Historic Places
- U.S. Historic district
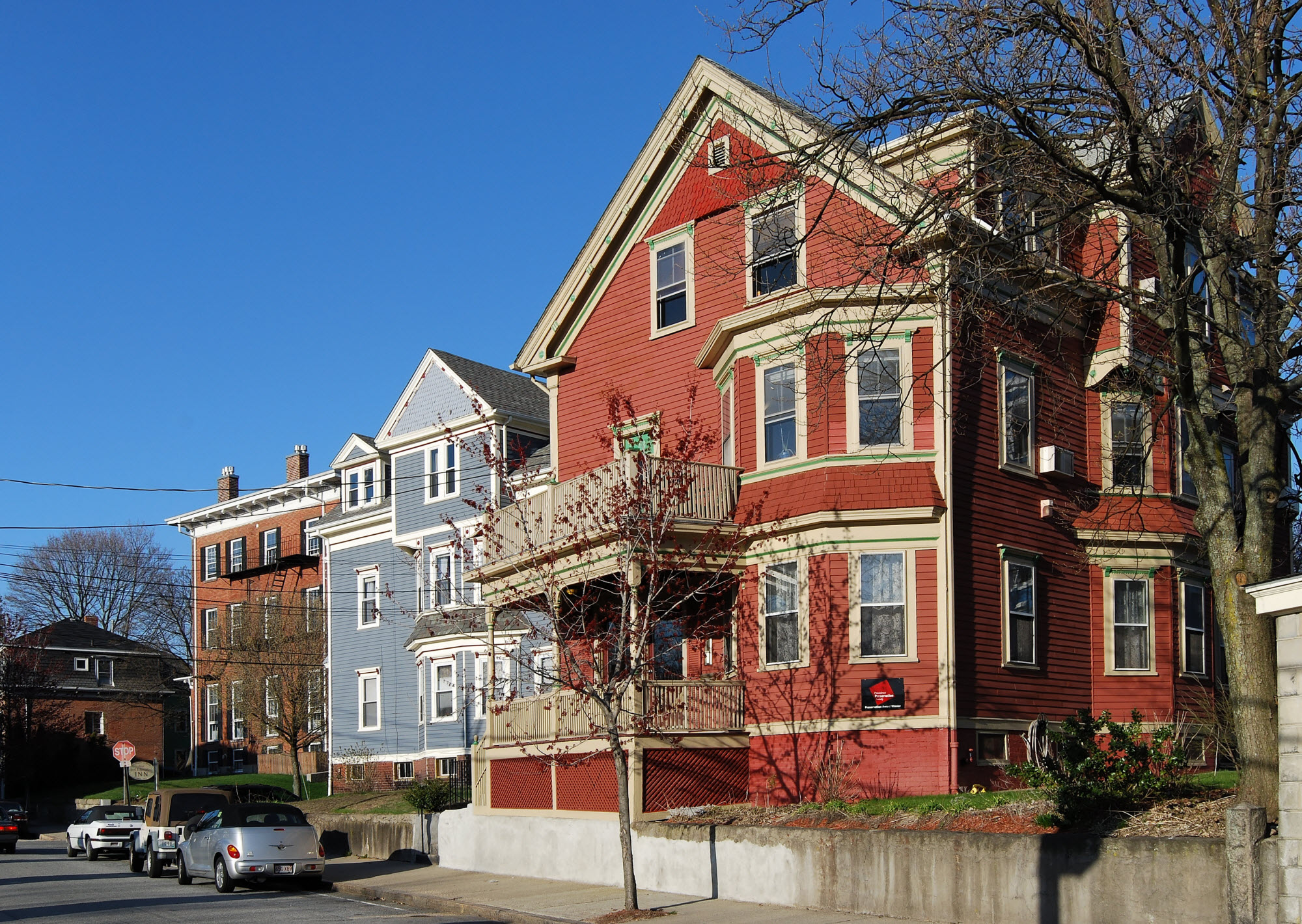
- Holden Street Providence, part of Smith Hill Historic District

- Location within Rhode Island Location within the United States
- Location: Providence, Rhode Island
- Architectural style: Italianate, Greek Revival
- NRHP reference No.: 93001183
- Added to NRHP: November 4, 1993

Smith Hill is a neighborhood in Providence, Rhode Island. Its traditional boundaries are the Woonasquatucket River, the Chad Brown public housing complex, Interstate 95 and West River.

The Roger Williams Medical Center (RWMC) is located in the Smith Hill neighborhood and is adjacent to the VA hospital.

The Rhode Island State House is also located on the border with Downtown. The name 'Smith Hill' is therefore used as a metonym for the Rhode Island state government and the Rhode Island General Assembly.

== History ==
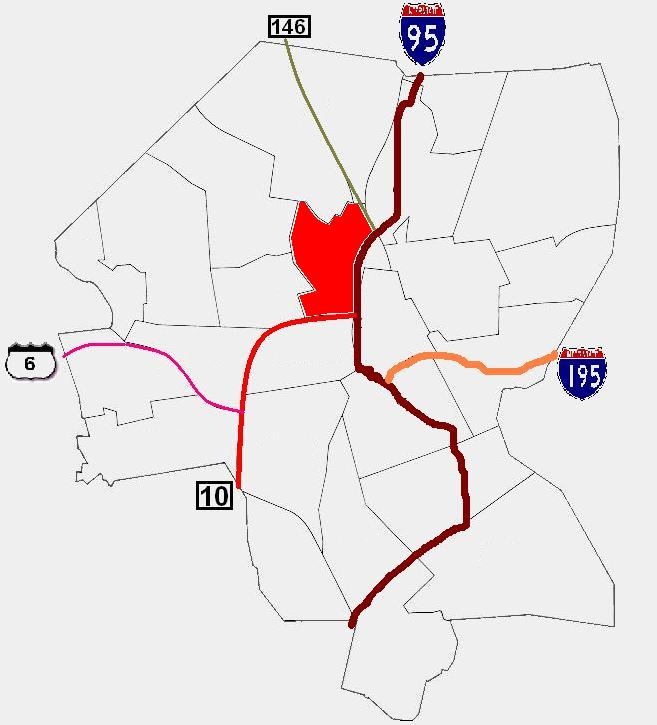
Providence neighborhoods with Smith Hill in red

The neighborhood gets its name from settler John Smith, who set up a grist mill in the area in 1636, after being banished from England.

Prior to the mid-1800s, the area was considered rural escape from downtown, with few homes. However, in the 1900s industrialization attracted immigrants from Ireland, Eastern Europe and the Balkans to work in nearby mills.

The neighborhood's proximity to the Woonasquatucket and Moshassuck Rivers provided power for the industrial mills.

In the 21st century, Smith Hill is home to about 6,000 people in a densely populated residential neighborhood. The location offers easy access to downtown, featuring small parks, a post office, a library branch, and the Harry Kizirian Elementary School. The Smith Hill Partners Initiative (SHPI) plans community events.

== Demographics ==
The neighborhood is home to whites of European descent and an increasing number of minorities. As of the 1990 census, Smith Hill was 20% Hispanic, 17.2% Asian and 12.2% black. The neighborhood's unemployment and poverty rates are above average for the city, though efforts have been made to revitalize the area, although, without success.

== Gallery ==
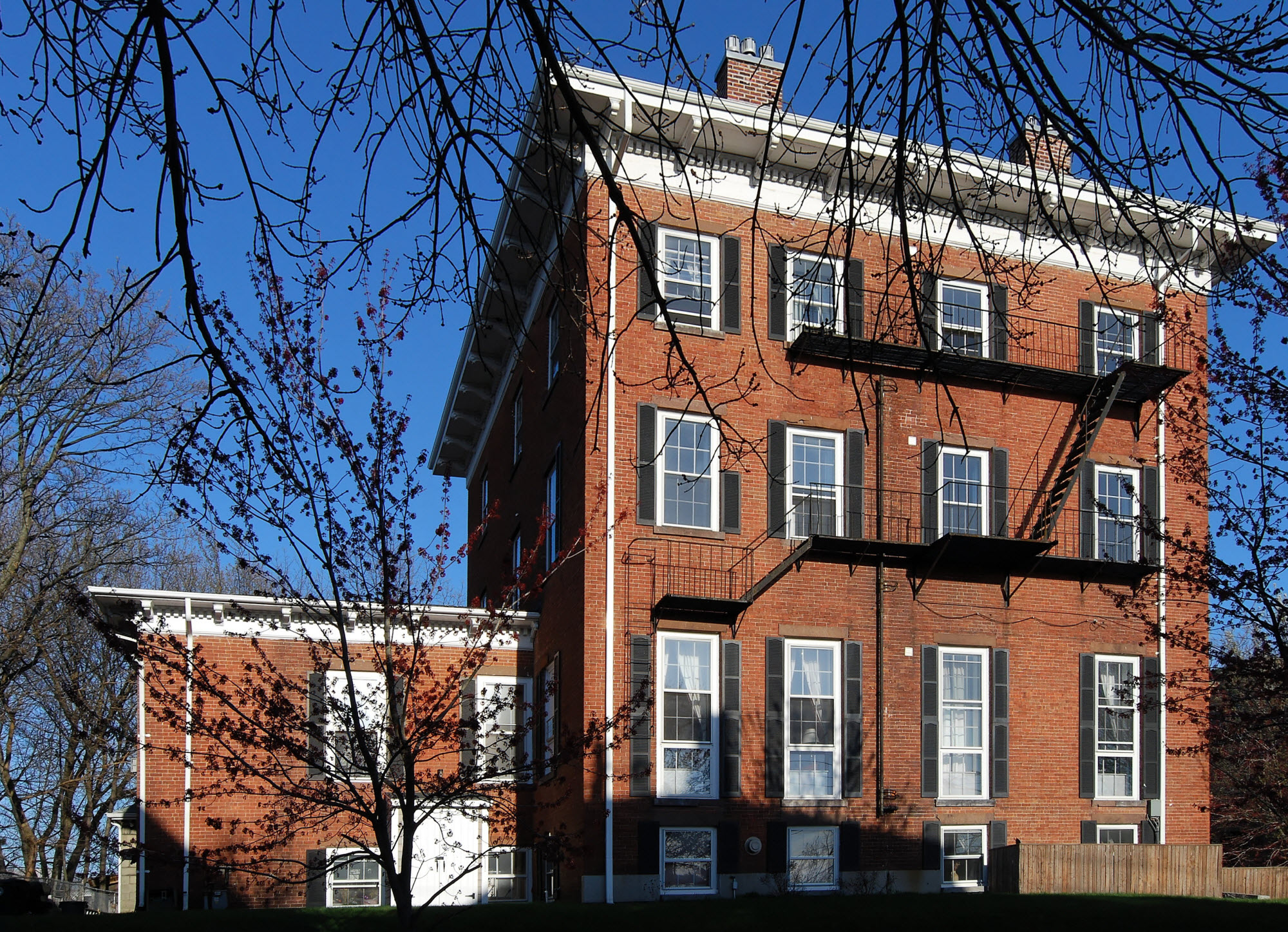
Christopher Dodge house, Holden Street

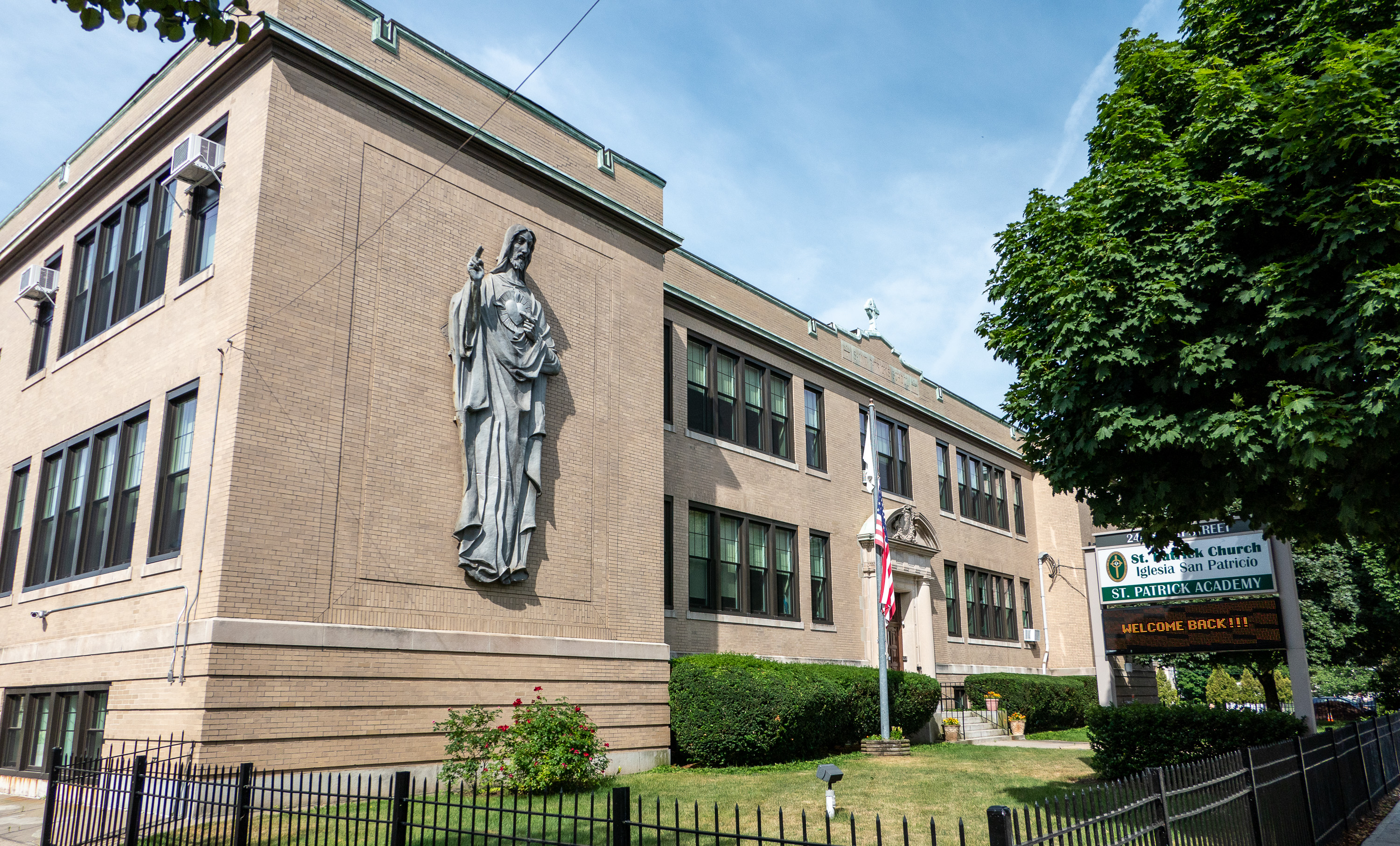
Saint Patrick Academy, 244 Smith Street

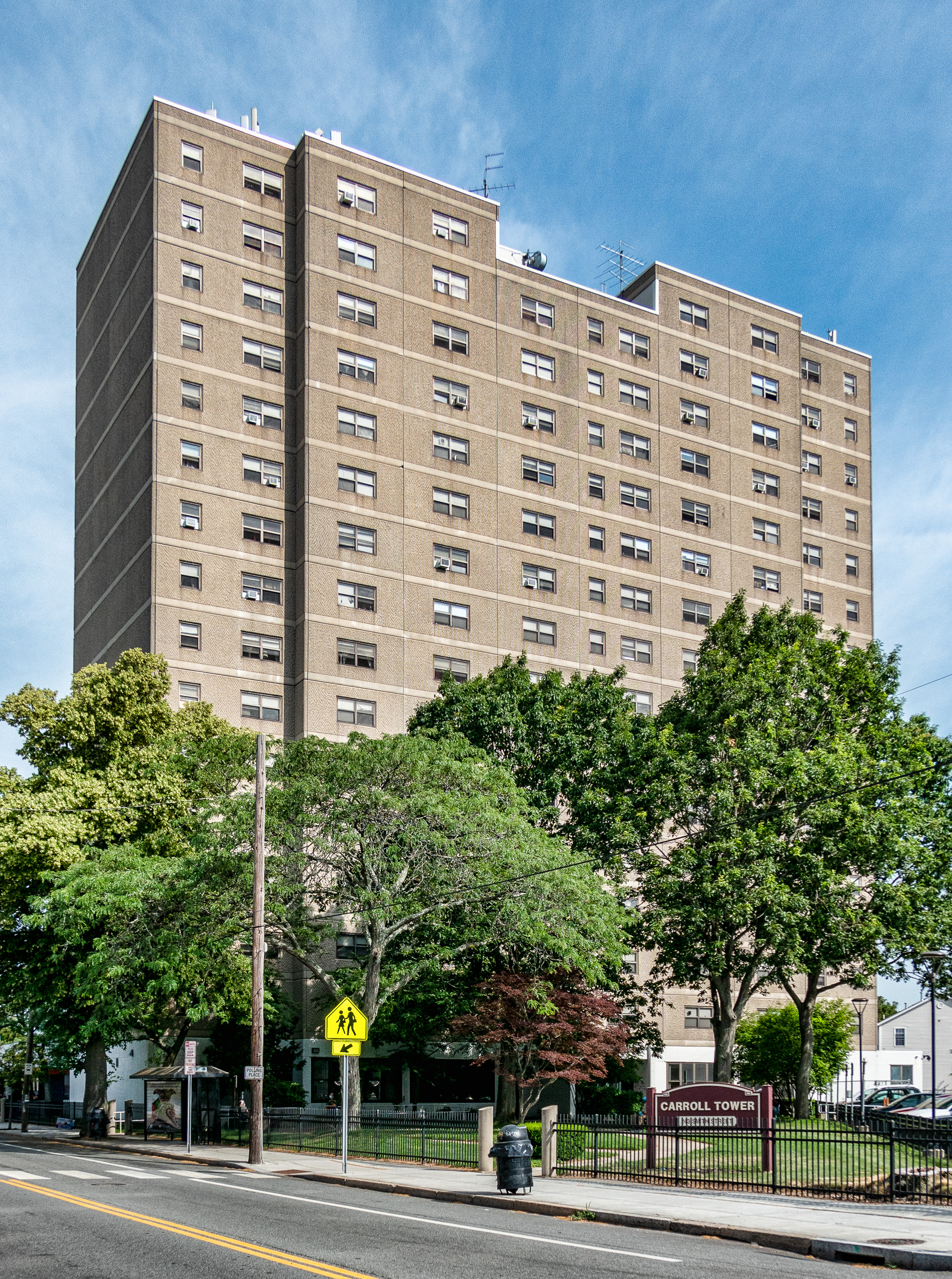
Carroll Tower, an assisted living facility on Smith Street

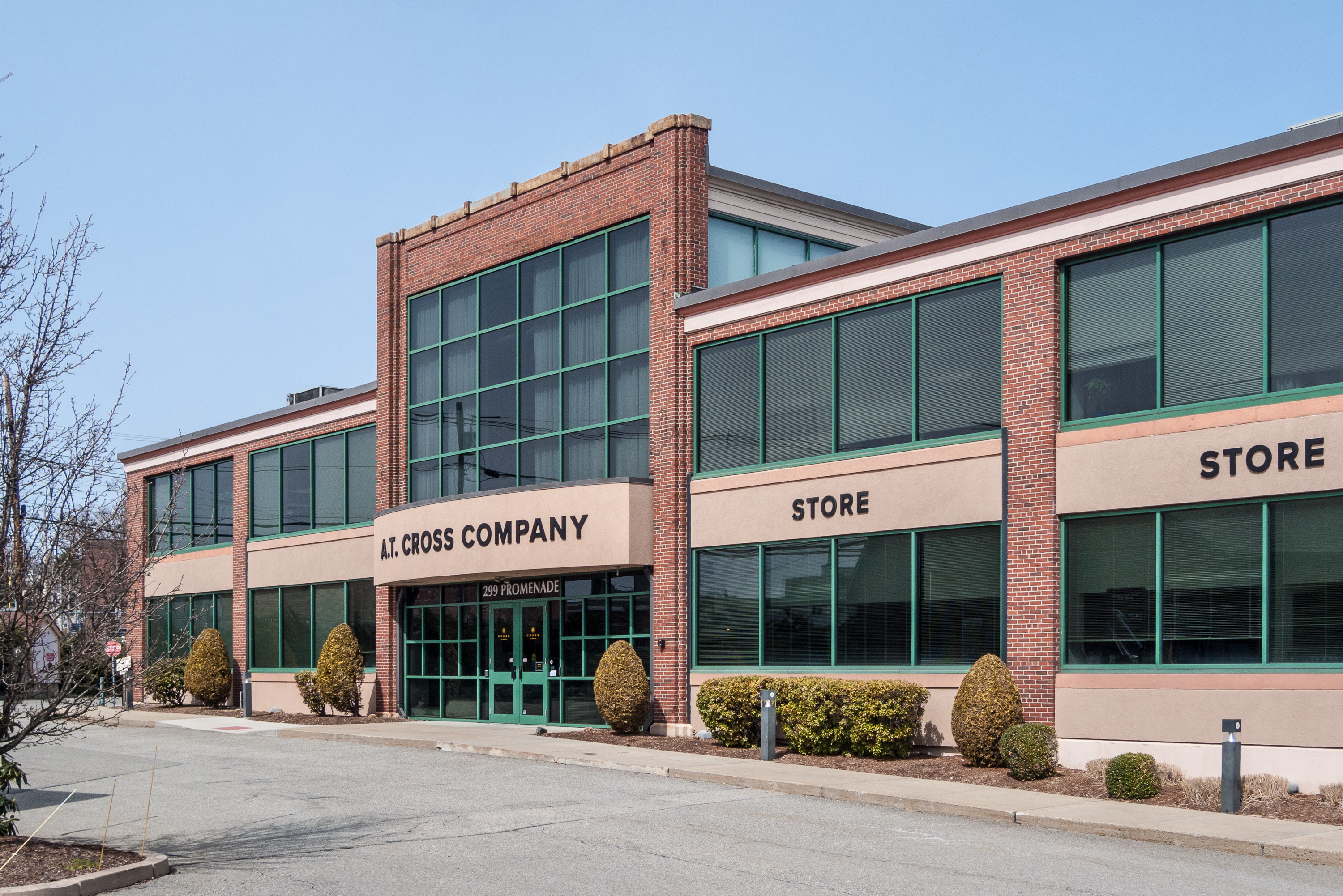
A. T. Cross Company headquarters, Promenade Street

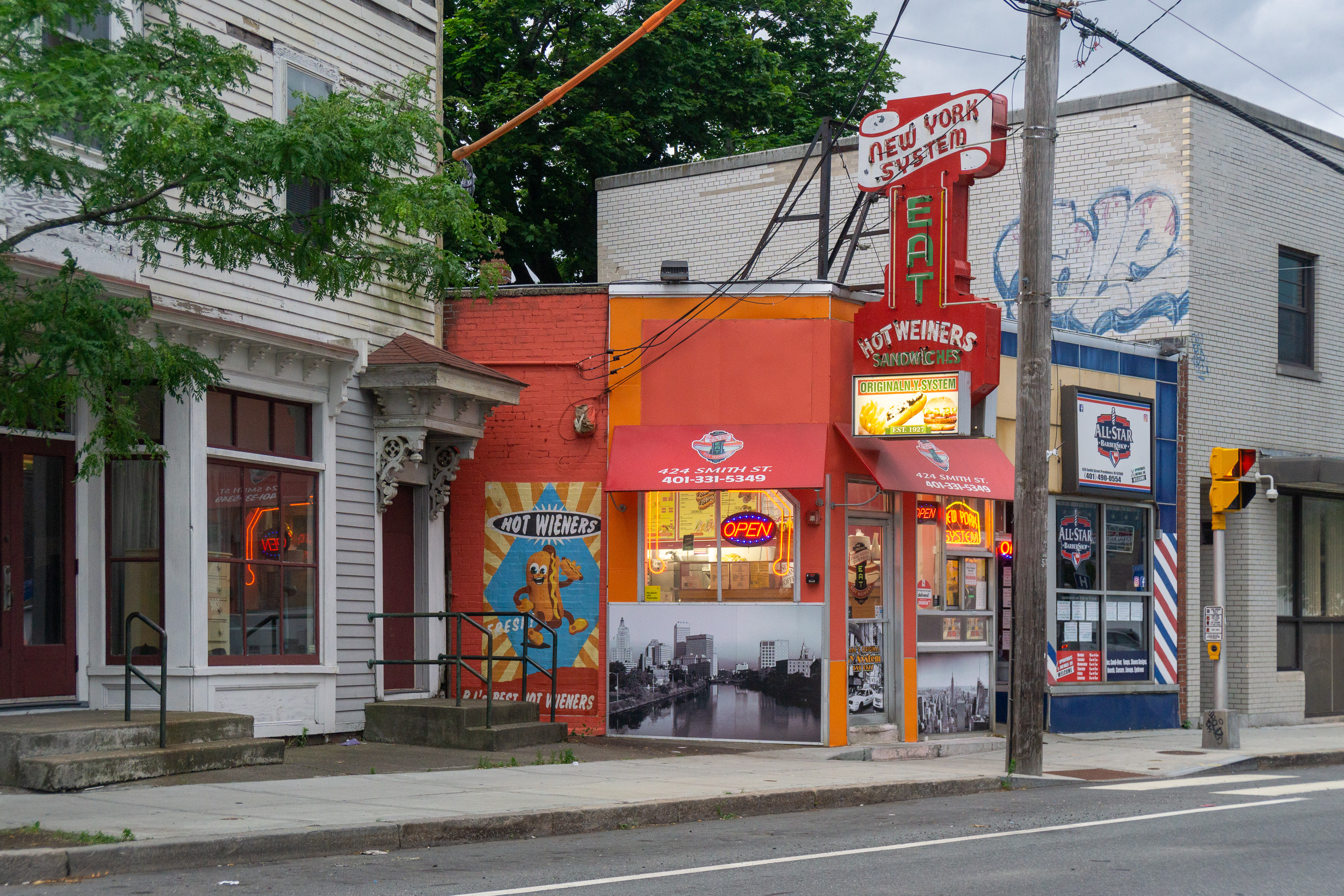
Baba's Original New York System, a local eatery on Smith Street
