= Providence VA Medical Center =

- Veterans' Administration

Geography
- Location: Providence, Rhode Island, United States
- Coordinates: 41.8313001°N 71.4326881°W

Organization
- Care system: Private
- Type: VA hospital

History
- Opened: 1948

Links
- Website: www.providence.va.gov
- Lists: Hospitals in Rhode Island

Providence VA Medical Center is a federal government hospital run by the Veterans' Administration at 830 Chalkstone Avenue in Providence, Rhode Island. The Providence VA Medical Center was constructed in 1948 after World War II with an additional wing constructed in 1977 and an ambulatory care building built it 1998. The medical center also runs three Community-Based Outpatient Clinics in New Bedford (since 1985), Hyannis (since 1998), and Middletown (since 2000) and the Eagle Square Annex.

== See also ==
- List of hospitals in Rhode Island
