= Roger Williams Medical Center =

Hospital in Rhode Island USA (opened 1878)

Coordinates: 41°50′6.1″N 71°26′6.8″W

- CharterCARE; Centurion Foundation

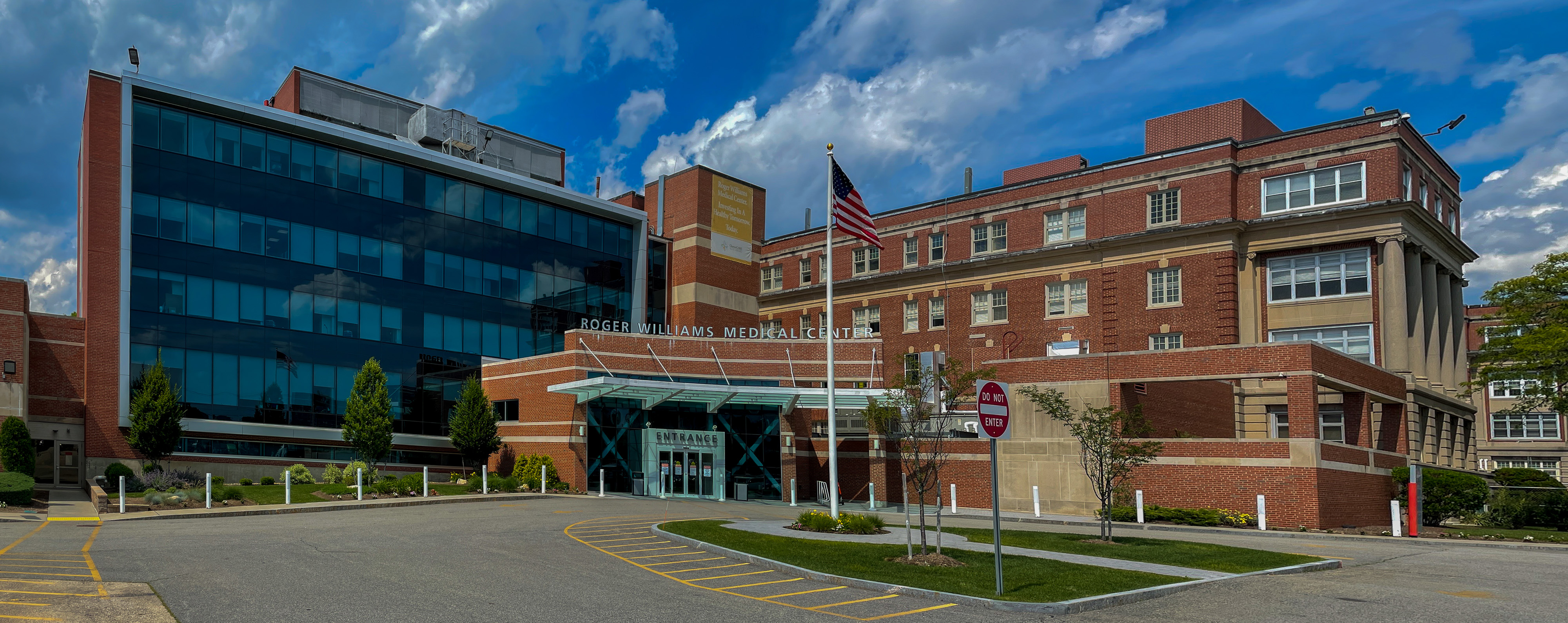

Geography
- Location: Providence, Rhode Island, United States

Organization
- Care system: Private
- Affiliated university: Boston University School of Medicine

History
- Founded: 1878

Links
- Website: http://www.rwmc.org
- Lists: Hospitals in Rhode Island

The Roger Williams Medical Center (RWMC) is a university-affiliated teaching hospital in Providence, Rhode Island. Roger Williams Medical Center has an affiliation with Boston University School of Medicine. The Roger Williams Medical Center (RWMC), located in the Elmhurst section of Providence, has served the community's health care needs since 1922. Along with corporate parent CharterCARE Health Partners and as a major teaching affiliate of Boston University School of Medicine (BUSM) (only about 50 miles away), this academic medical center has attained fully accredited ACGME teaching programs for more than 40 years.

On January 12, 2025, Prospect Medical filed for Chapter 11 bankruptcy protection, listing assets and liabilities between $1 billion and $10 billion. The company struggled with rising interest costs and high debt. In March 2026, ownership of the hospital was transferred to the Centurion Foundation.

== Overview ==
Founded in 1878, and located in the Smith Hill neighborhood of Providence, RWMC is community owned and governed. It is named after Roger Williams, the founder of Rhode Island. Since 1997, it has been formally affiliated with the Boston University School of Medicine. The center is also located adjacent to the VA hospital in Providence, which provides veterans with specific care needs. In serving the people of Southern New England, RWMC offers services in emergency medicine, cancer care, diagnostic imaging, home care, and extended long-term care. RWMC also manages the only Bone Marrow Unit in the state of Rhode Island.

The Quality Assurance Review Center (QARC) was housed at the RWMC until 2003.

== Quality Care and Education ==
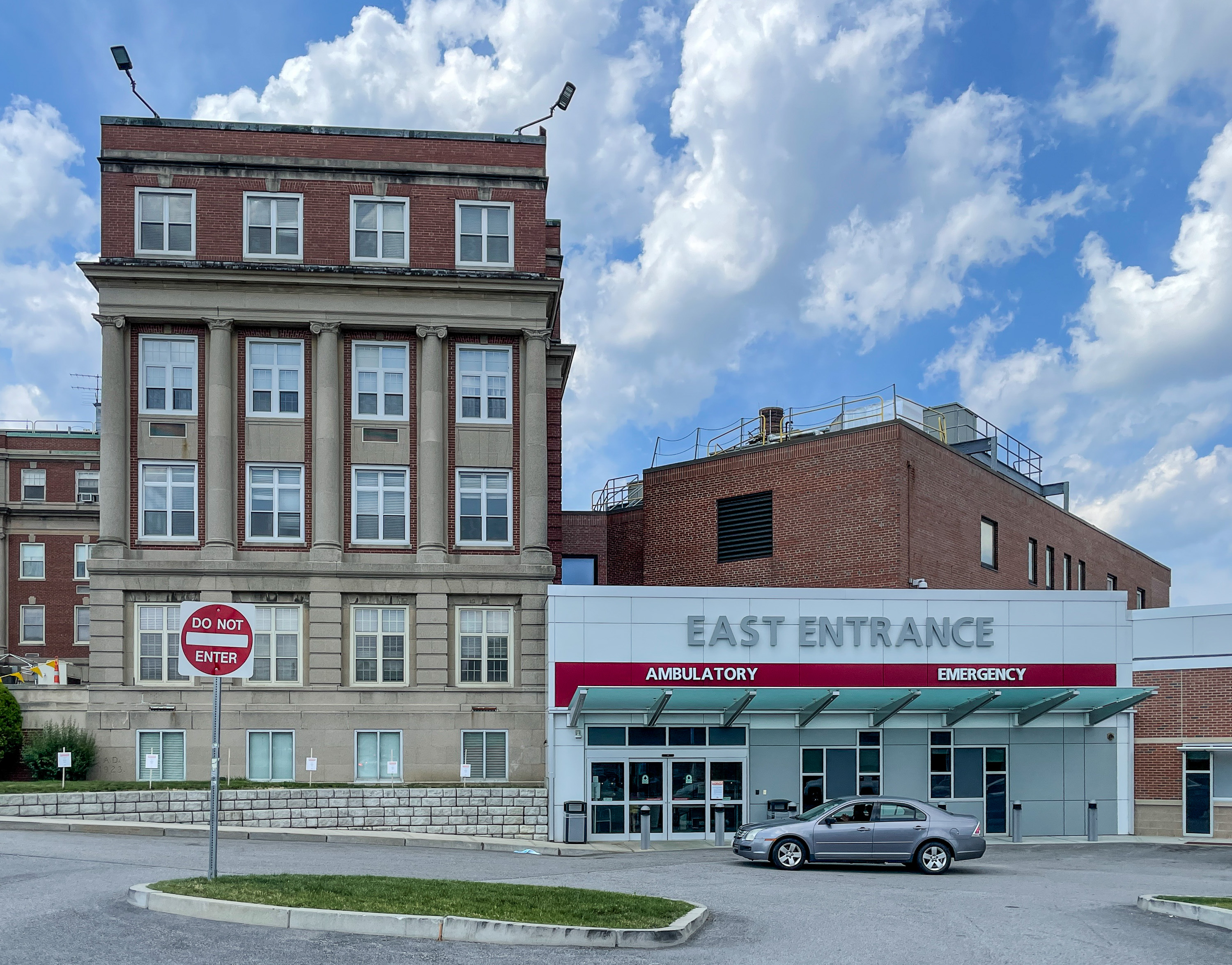
East Entrance

Located in one of the city's oldest neighborhoods, Roger Williams Medical Center is a community-owned and governed health care organization that provides speciality care. RWMC includes a 220-bed acute care hospital, outpatient practice in primary care and medicine subspecialties, including the Resident Clinic. Also located on the campus is the Decof Cancer Center and home for the state's only Bone Marrow Transplantation Unit. More than eighty graduates of the training program now practice in Rhode Island, making it one of the principal providers of physicians in the area.

The RWMC teaching faculty holds academic appointments at Boston University School of Medicine. The sponsored training programs are as follows: Internal Medicine, Podiatry, Hematology and Oncology, Infectious Diseases, Pulmonary, Rheumatology, Dermatology and Surgical Oncology.

== CharterCARE Health Partners ==
On October 28, 2009, CharterCARE Health Partners, the corporate parent of Roger Williams Medical Center and St. Joseph Health Services of Rhode Island, received approval of its affiliation proposal by Rhode Island Attorney General Patrick Lynch. This approval followed a concurrent review and approval by the Rhode Island Department of Health. CharterCARE Health Partners, created through the affiliation of Roger Williams Medical Center and St. Joseph Health Services of Rhode Island, was formed to preserve and enhance quality health care for the communities they serve.

== See also ==
- List of hospitals in Rhode Island
