= List of hospitals in Rhode Island =

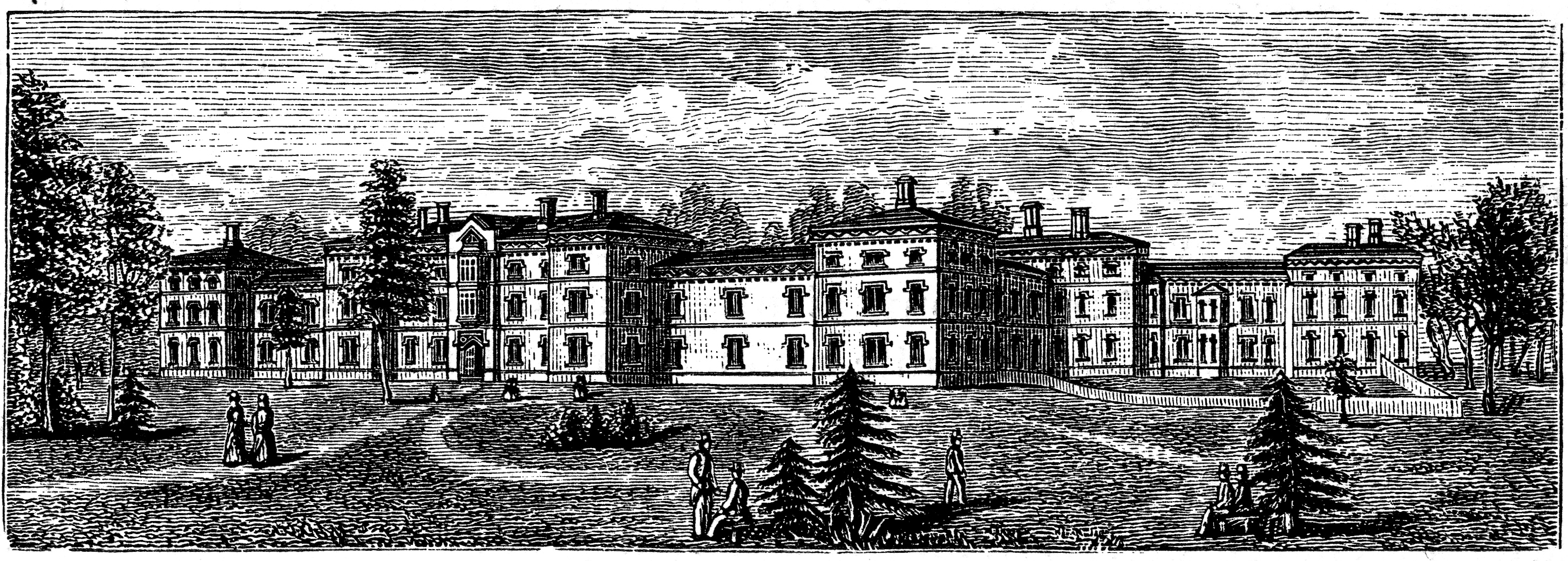
Butler Hospital, the oldest hospital in Rhode Island, in continuous operation since 1844.

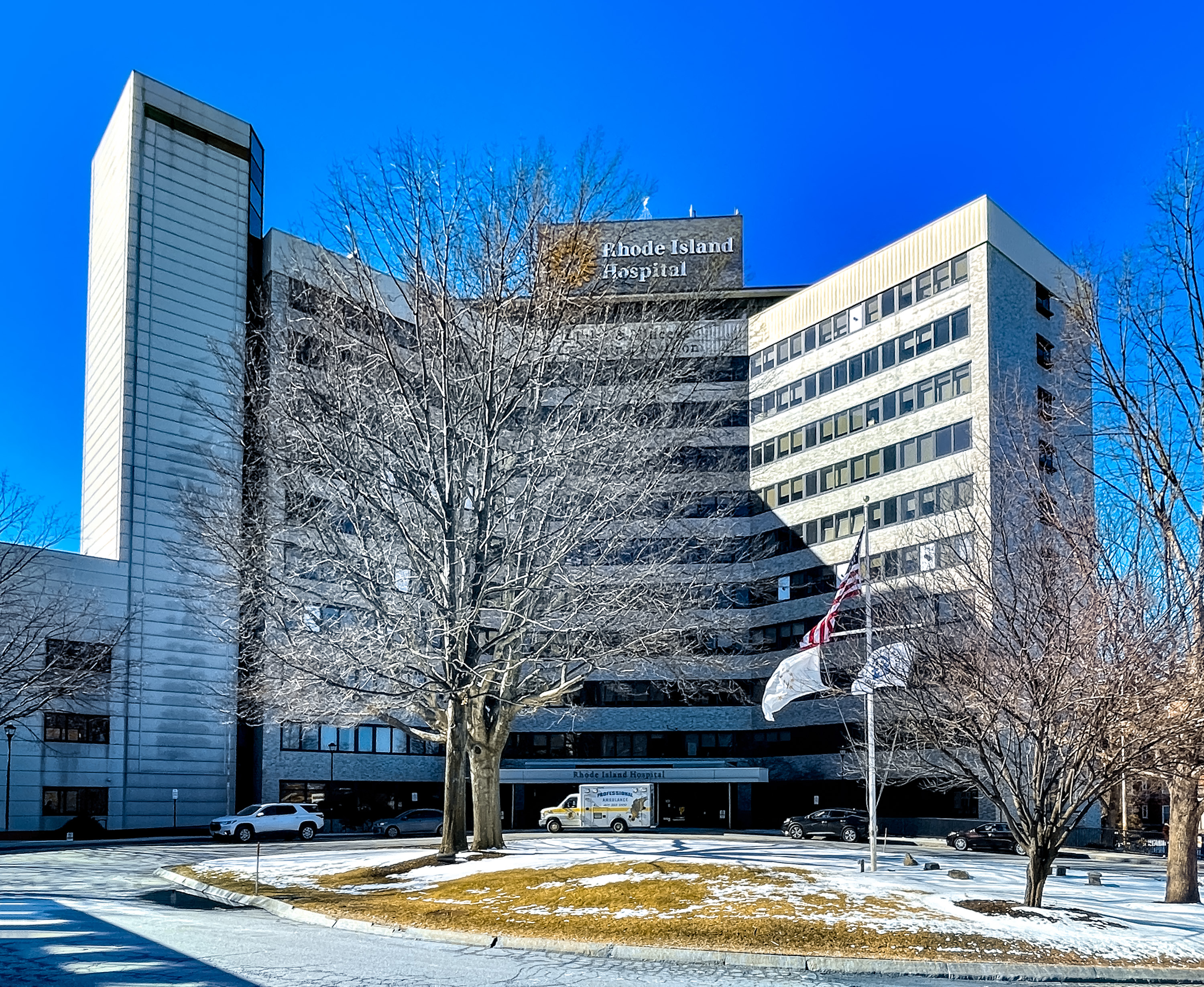
Rhode Island Hospital, the state's largest hospital and its only Level 1 trauma center.

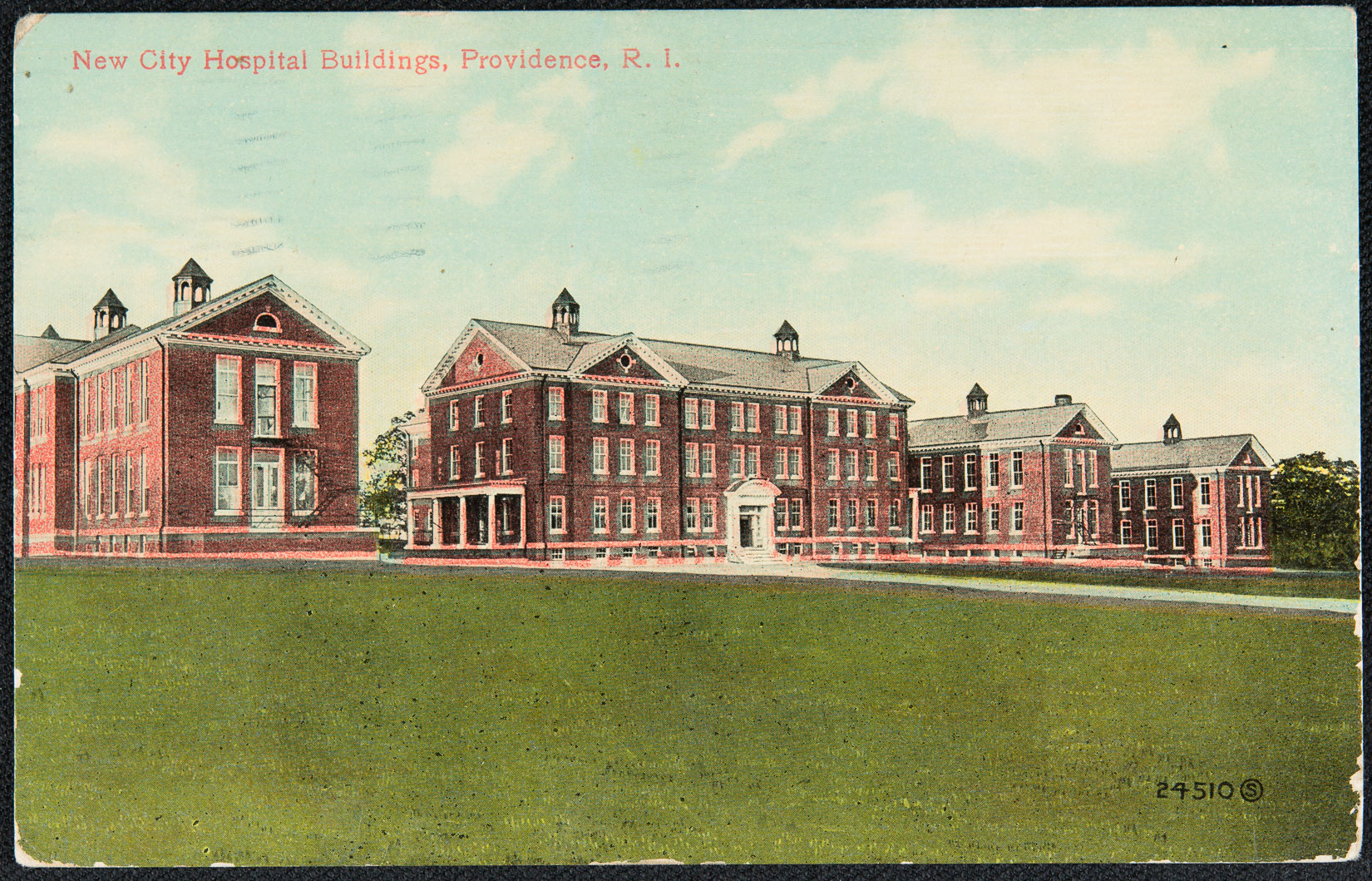
Former Providence City Hospital

This is a list of current and former hospitals in the U.S. state of Rhode Island. By default, the list is sorted alphabetically by name. This table also provides the hospital network of each hospital (if applicable), the city and county where it is located, whether or not it has an emergency department, when it was opened and closed, its current status, type, and former names.

- Name: The most recent name of the hospital. Former names will be listed in the last column.
- City, Town, or Neighborhood: The lowest level census designation of the hospital's most recent location.
- Network: The parent organization or government agency in charge of the hospital. For closed hospitals, the network will retain its name at the time of closure and will not be updated if the network changes its name. Text will be italicized if the hospital is independent or if it is owned or operated by a public entity.
- Emergency Department: Indicates the presence of an emergency department, along with trauma designation if applicable. "Former" if the hospital used to have one.
- Opened-Closed: The years of operation.
  - Opened, when possible, specifically refers to the date on which the facility admitted its first patient.
- Status / Type / Notes:
  - Status is in italics and is generally in reference to a hospital's inpatient operations: Active, Succeeded, or Closed. Marked "Fate Unknown" if the hospital is no longer in operation but it cannot be determined if it was closed or acquired.
  - Hospital type, when available, comes after Status. When applicable, the type will always reference data from the Massachusetts Center for Health Information and Analysis. As CHIA was formed in 2012, any hospitals which either closed before data was collected or which do not fall under its purview (such as federal facilities) will be given the most appropriate typing.
  - Notes will encompass all other appropriate information, including former names.

Note: Closures and opening dates, in the case where a hospital is acquired or merges with another, will be designated depending on how substantial the change is. For example, single hospitals purchased by a new entity will generally not be considered to have closed, however simultaneous mergers of multiple hospitals may be considered as a closure of the old hospitals and opening of a new facility. Additionally, a facility which is still in business is considered "closed" if a change in operation leads to the facility no longer meeting an arguable definition of "hospital."

== List ==
Rhode Island Hospitals
Name	Network/Parent	City/Town	County	Emergency Department? (Trauma Level)	Opened-Closed	Status / Type / Notes
Bradley Hospital	Brown University Health	East Providence	Providence	No	1931 – present	Active
Butler Hospital	Care New England	Providence	Providence	No	1847 – present	Active
Charles V. Chapin Hospital	City of Providence	Providence	Providence		1910 – c. 1974	Closed - Opened as the Providence City Hospital, renamed in honor of Charles V. Chapin in 1931. The properties were transferred to Providence College in 1974.
Cranston General Hospital		Cranston	Providence		1933 – 1993	Closed - Opened as the Osteopathic Hospital of Rhode Island in 1933. Renamed Osteopathic General Hospital in 1947. Renamed once again in 1971 as Cranston General Hospital. Closed September, 1993 as a result of bankruptcy.
Eleanor Slater Hospital	Rhode Island Department of Behavioral Healthcare, Developmental Disabilities & Hospitals	Burrillville	Providence	No	1994 – present	Active
Eleanor Slater Hospital at the John O. Pastore Center	Rhode Island Department of Behavioral Healthcare, Developmental Disabilities & Hospitals	Cranston	Providence	No		
Hasbro Children's Hospital	Brown University Health	Providence	Providence	Yes (Pedi Level 1)	1994 – present	Active
John E. Fogarty Memorial Hospital	The Ladd School	Exeter	Washington		1962 – ?	Closed
Kent Hospital	Care New England	Warwick	Kent	Yes	1951 – present	Active
Landmark Medical Center	Prime Healthcare Services	Woonsocket	Providence	Yes	1988–present	Active
Lovell General Hospital	United States Army	Portsmouth	Newport		1862 – 1865	Closed
Memorial Hospital of Rhode Island	Care New England	Pawtucket	Providence		1894 – 2018	Closed
Miriam Hospital	Brown University Health	Providence	Providence	Yes	1925 – present	Active
Naval Hospital Newport	United States Navy	Newport	Newport		1913 – 1991	Closed
Newport Hospital	Brown University Health	Newport	Newport	Yes	1873 – present	Active
Our Lady of Fatima Hospital	CharterCARE	North Providence	Providence	Yes	1954 – present	Active
Providence VA Medical Center	United States Department of Veterans Affairs	Providence	Providence	Yes (ER for enrolled VA patients only)	1948 – present	Active
Rhode Island Hospital	Brown University Health	Providence	Providence	Yes (Adult Level 1)	1868 – present	Active
Rehabilitation Hospital of Rhode Island	Prime Healthcare Services	North Smithfield	Providence	No	1965 – present	Active
Rhode Island Homeopathic Hospital		Providence	Providence		1884 – 1900	Closed
Roger Williams Medical Center	CharterCARE	Providence	Providence	Yes	1878 – present	Active
South County Hospital	Independent	Wakefield	Washington	Yes	1919 – present	Active
Saint Joseph's Hospital	CharterCARE	Providence	Providence		1892 – present	Active
Westerly Hospital	Yale New Haven Health System	Westerly	Washington	Yes	1925 – present	Active
Women & Infants Hospital of Rhode Island	Care New England	Providence	Providence	Yes	1885 – present	Active - Opened as the Providence Lying-In Hospital
