= Eleanor Slater Hospital =

Coordinates: 41.744945°N 71.462648°W

- State of Rhode Island and Providence Plantations

Geography
- Location: Cranston & Burrillville, Rhode Island, United States

Organization
- Care system: Public
- Type: Specialist

Services
- Emergency department: No
- Beds: 495
- Speciality: Behavioral Health

History
- Opened: 1994

Links
- Website: bhddh.ri.gov/eleanor-slater-hospital
- Lists: Hospitals in Rhode Island

The Eleanor Slater Hospital is Rhode Island's state psychiatric hospital with campuses at the John O. Pastore Center at 111 Howard Avenue in Cranston, Rhode Island and the Zambarano division at Wallum Lake in Burrillville, Rhode Island.

== History ==
In 1994 "the three state hospitals operated by RI Department of Mental Health Retardation and Hospitals integrated into one hospital system; the Eleanor Slater Unified Hospital System (ESH). The 495 bed public hospital consists of two campus locations: The Eleanor Slater Hospital at the John O. Pastore Center in Cranston, RI and the Eleanor Slater Hospital/Zambarano Unit in Burrillville, RI." The Zambarano Unit was founded in 1905 as a tuberculosis sanatorium. The Adolf Meyer building was completed in 1936 and was named after Adolf Meyer (psychiatrist) one of the first to take on occupational therapy. Eleanor Slater Hospital is named after a prominent Rhode Island Democratic Party supporter, "who had particular interests in housing, mental health, and the elderly. [Slater] died on March 11, [2006] at age 97."

== See also ==
- List of hospitals in Rhode Island
