= Our Lady of Fatima Hospital (North Providence) =

Coordinates: 41.855391°N 71.459809°W

- CharterCARE; Centurion Foundation

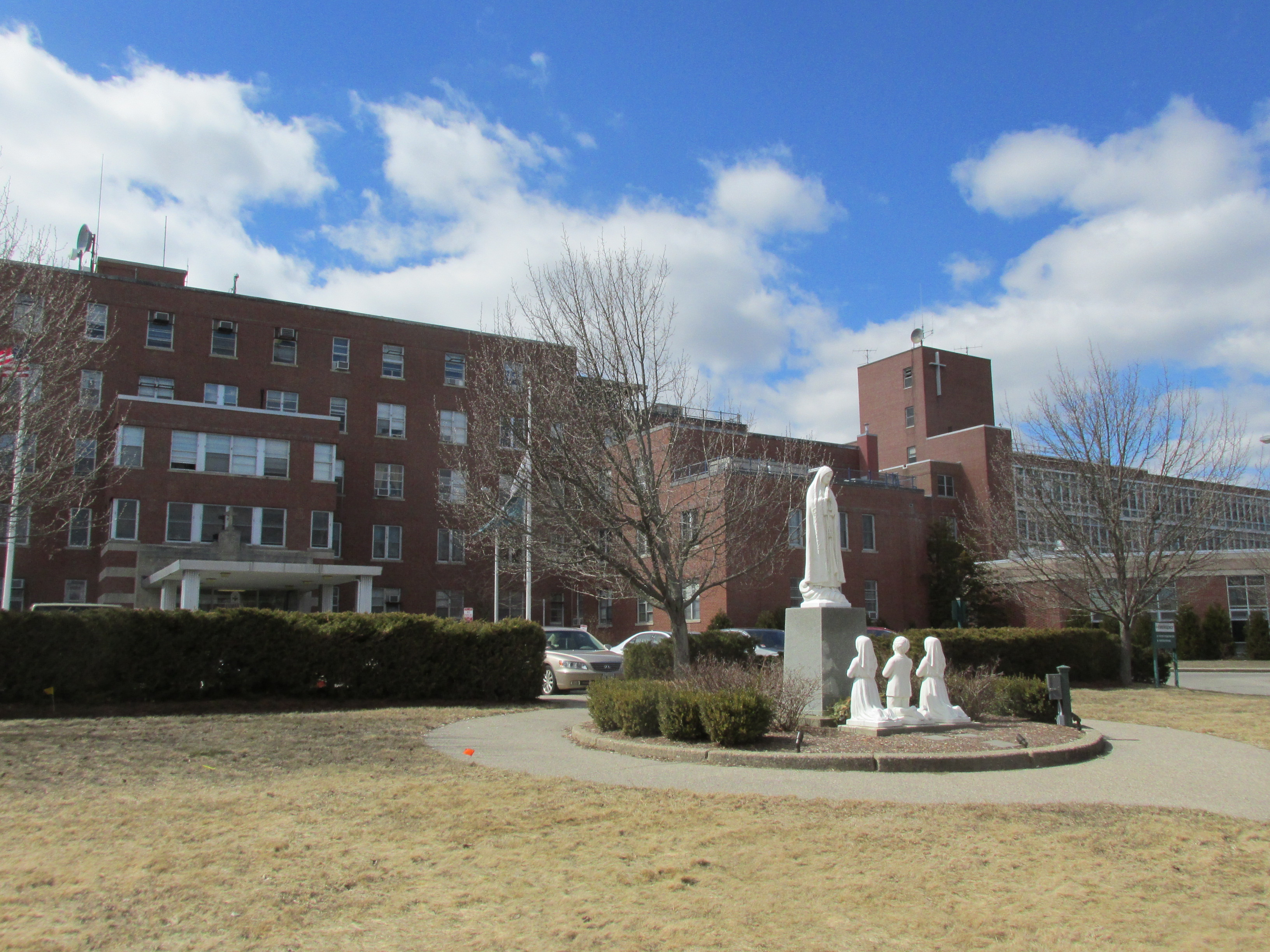
- Fatima Hospital

Geography
- Location: 200 High Service Ave; North Providence, Rhode Island, United States

Organization
- Care system: Private

Services
- Emergency department: yes

History
- Founded: 1954

Links
- Website: http://www.fatimahospital.com/
- Lists: Hospitals in Rhode Island

Our Lady of Fatima Hospital (more commonly Fatima Hospital) is a for-profit hospital in North Providence, Rhode Island, which opened in 1954. The hospital is sponsored by the Roman Catholic Diocese of Providence. The Diocese merged St. Joseph and Our Lady of Fatima Hospitals in the 1970s.

On January 12, 2025, Prospect Medical filed for Chapter 11 bankruptcy protection, listing assets and liabilities between $1 billion and $10 billion. The company struggled with rising interest costs and high debt. In March 2026, ownership of the hospital was transferred to the Centurion Foundation.

== See also ==
- List of hospitals in Rhode Island
