= Rhode Island Hospital =

Trauma center in Rhode Island, US

Coordinates: 41°48′42.4″N 71°24′32.8″W

- Brown University Health

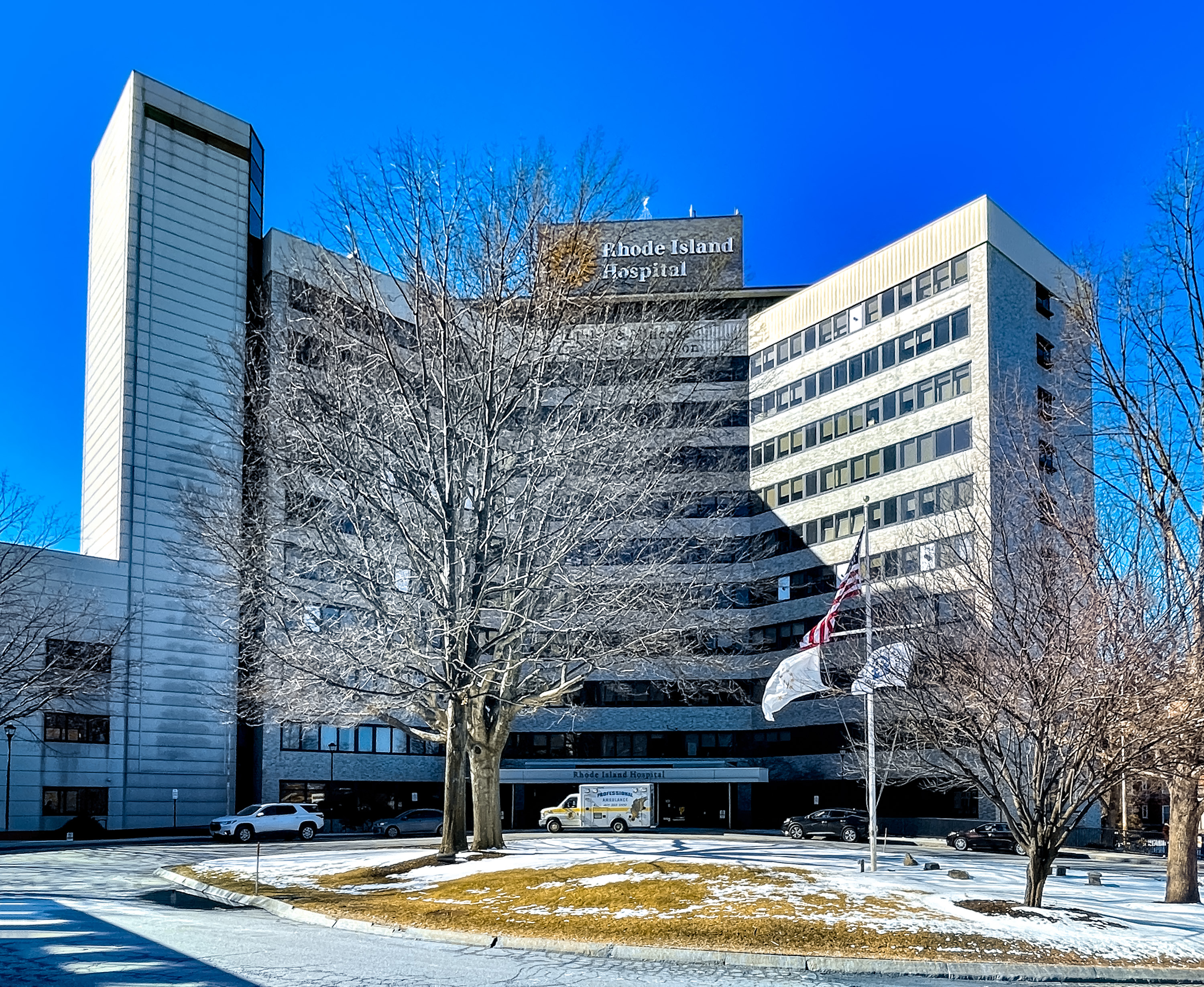
- Zecchino Pavilion (main building)

Geography
- Location: Providence, Rhode Island, United States

Organization
- Care system: Private
- Type: Teaching
- Affiliated university: Warren Alpert Medical School of Brown University

Services
- Emergency department: Level I trauma center
- Beds: 719

Helipads
- Helipad: FAA LID: RI25

History
- Founded: 1863

Links
- Website: www.brownhealth.org/locations/rhode-island-hospital
- Lists: Hospitals in Rhode Island

Rhode Island Hospital is a private, not-for-profit hospital in the Upper South Providence neighborhood of Providence, Rhode Island, United States. Affiliated with Brown University since 1959, it is now part of Brown University Health.

As an acute care teaching hospital, Rhode Island Hospital is the principal provider of specialty care in the region and the only Level I Trauma Center in the state.

== Overview ==
Rhode Island Hospital is the main teaching hospital of the Warren Alpert Medical School of Brown University. Rhode Island Hospital ranks 13th among independent hospitals that receive funding from the National Institutes of Health, with research awards of more than $27 million annually. Many of its physicians are recognized as leaders in their respective fields of cancer, cardiology, diabetes, orthopedics, trauma, and minimally invasive surgery. The hospital's pediatrics wing, Hasbro Children's Hospital, has pioneered numerous procedures and is at the forefront of fetal surgery, orthopedics, and pediatric neurosurgery. Together with the Miriam Hospital, Rhode Island Hospital is a founding member of the Brown University Health system (formerly named Lifespan).

Rhode Island Hospital employs nearly 8,000 full and part-time workers. The hospital's medical staff retains 1,843 physicians, as of 2016. Board certification or eligibility in a specialty or subspecialty is required for all appointed members of the medical staff, as well as those with limited clinical privileges.

== History ==
Rhode Island Hospital buildings

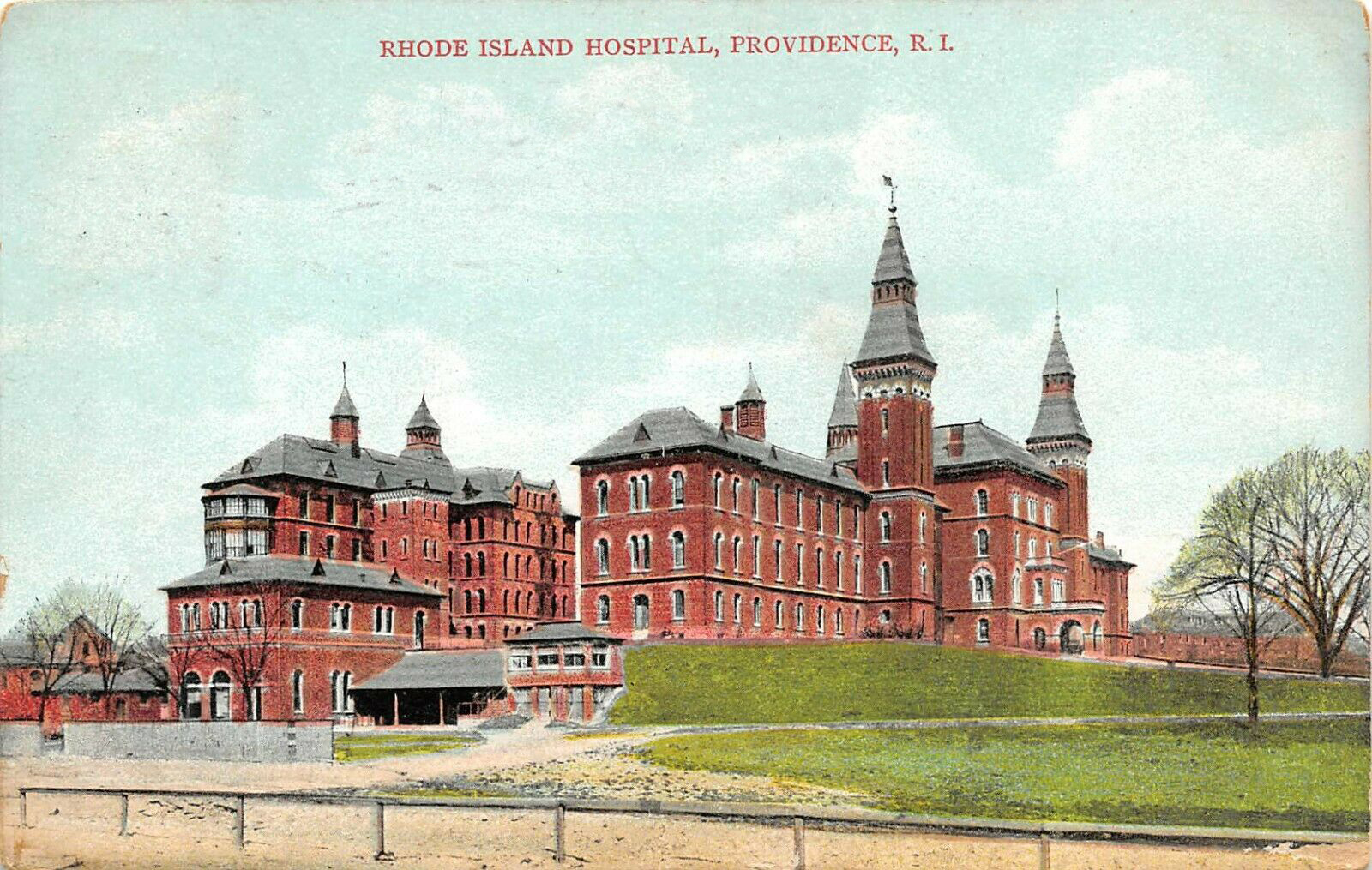
Original Victorian campus in 1908 (demolished)

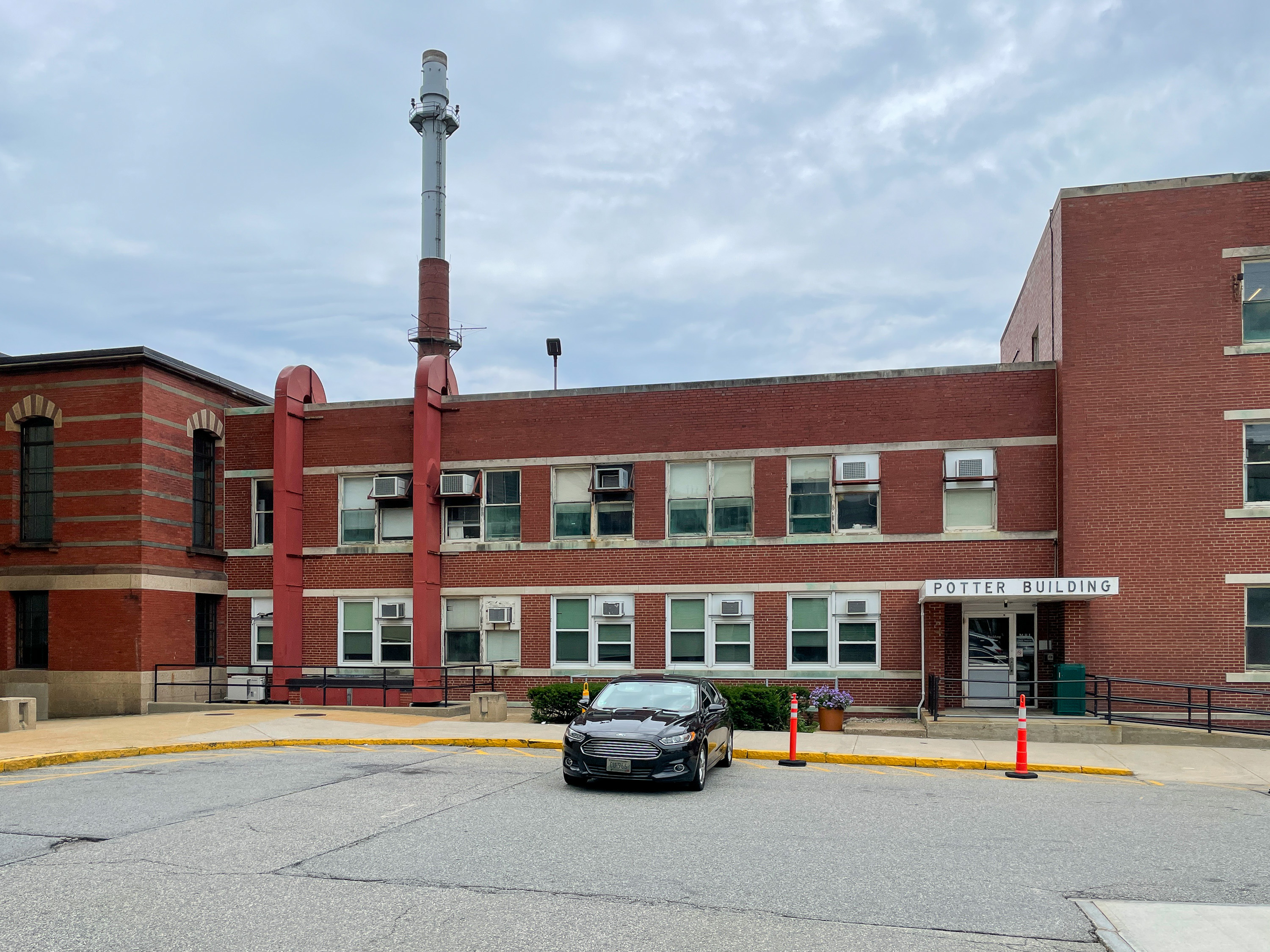
Potter Building

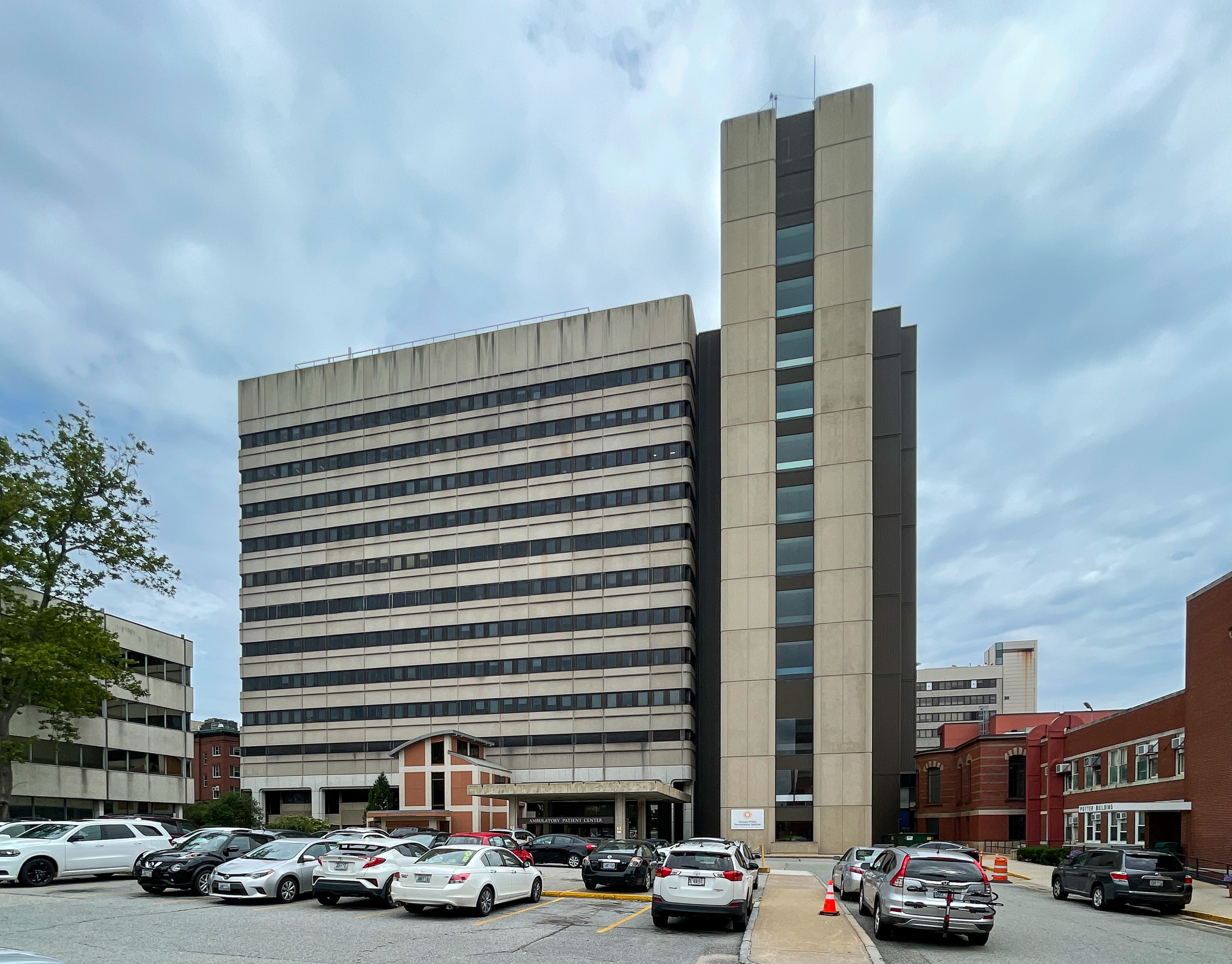
APC Building

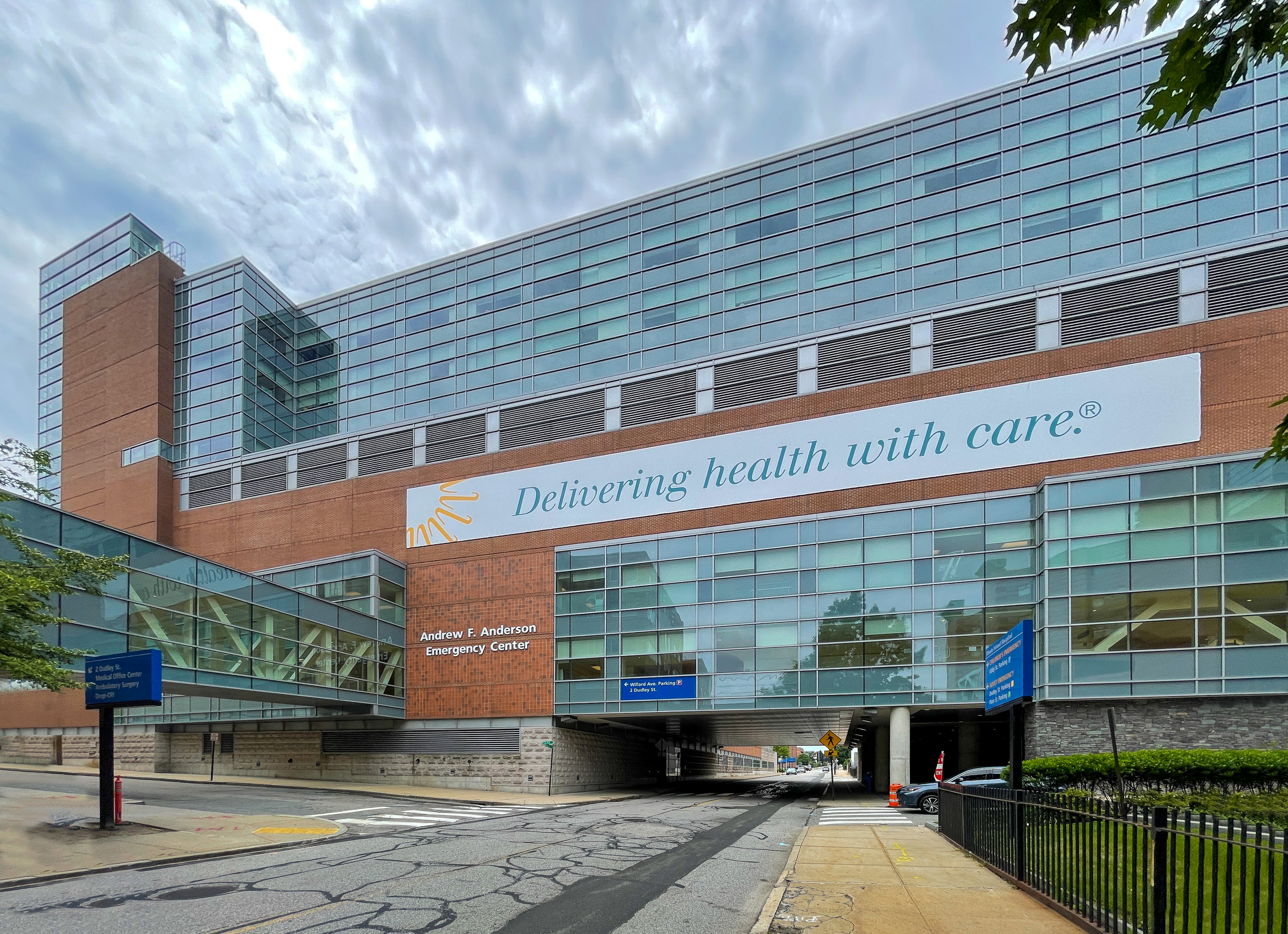
Bridge Building and Anderson Emergency Center

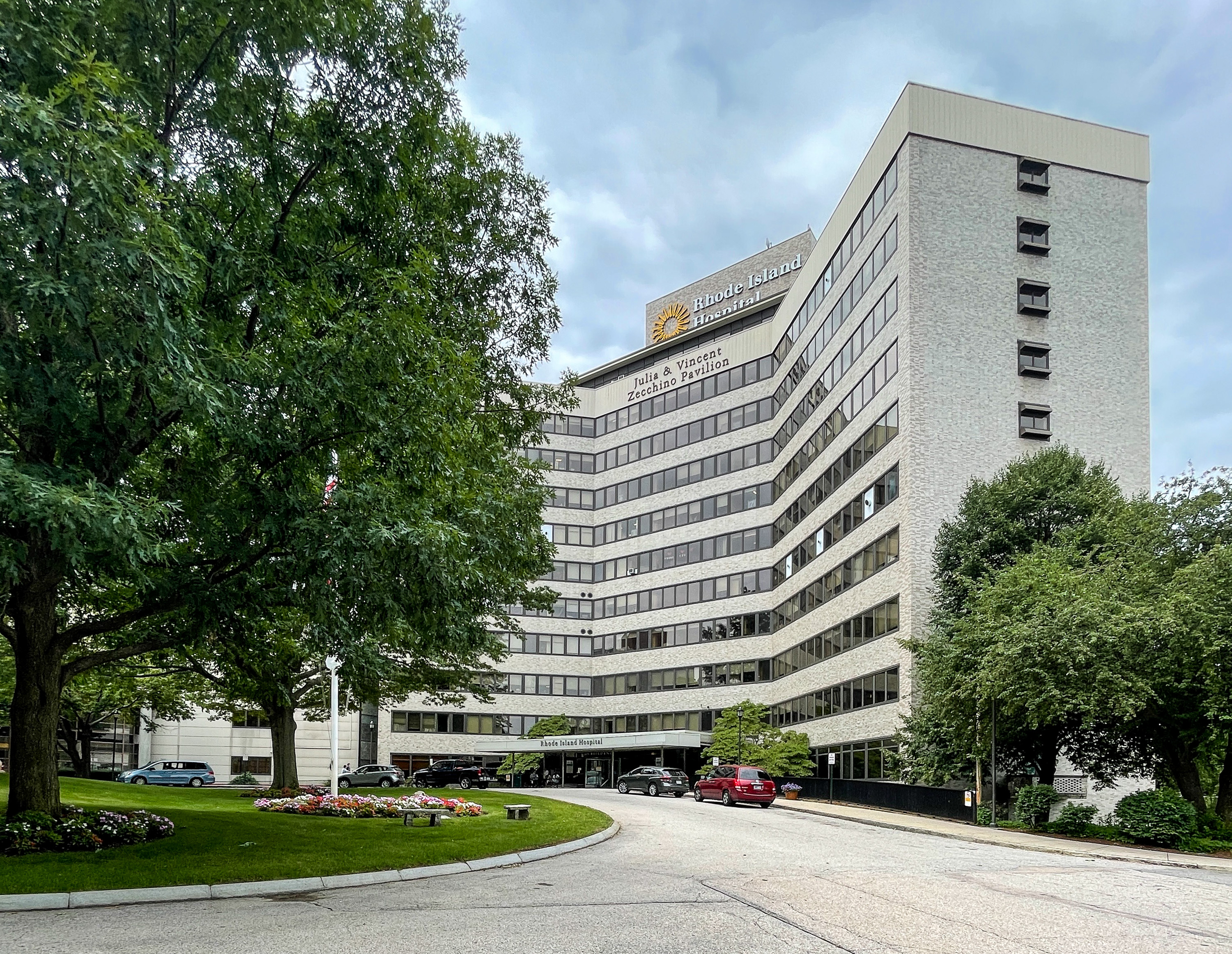
Zecchino Pavilion (main building)

Physicians Office Building (1961)

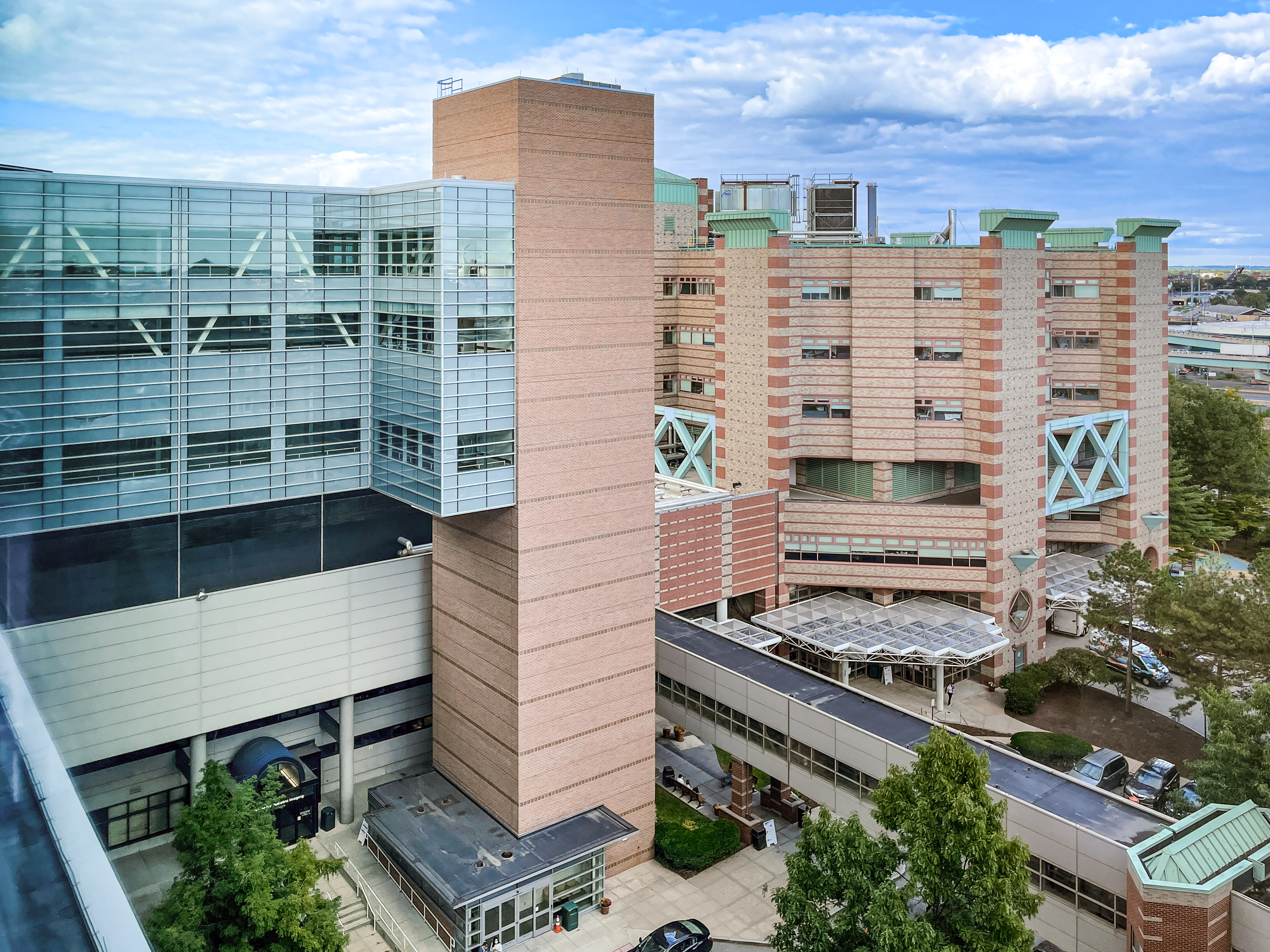
View from the bridge Building, looking at the Pediatric Imaging Center and Hasbro Building

In 1857, a small group led by Moses Brown Ives established a fund for a community hospital. The hospital was not officially founded until 1863, during the American Civil War, with the support Henry J. Steere, local manufacturer, philanthropist, and trustee, and others. John Sutherland, a local shoemaker, was the first patient admitted to Rhode Island Hospital on October 6, 1858.

The original Main Hospital Building was built in the 1860s, and the Southwest Pavilion was designed in Victorian style by architects Stone, Carpenter and Willson in 1898 and opened in 1900.

In 1915, the hospital became the first in the region and third in the nation to have an EKG machine.

In 1931, Pembroke College at Brown University partnered with the Rhode Island Hospital Training School to establish the area's first nursing program, training women to both learn and teach in nursing practices.

The hospital's main 10-story building was opened in 1955, and the Ambulatory Patient Center (APC Building) was completed in the 1970s. The Anderson Emergency building, connected to the complex via the Bridge Building, opened in 2005. The Southwest Pavilion, the last remaining building of the hospital's original 19th-century Victorian campus, was demolished in 2015 over the objection of local preservationists.

As Rhode Island's only Level 1 trauma center, the hospital received all nine surviving gunshot victims of the 2025 Brown University shooting.

== Treatment ==
The hospital is the largest of the state's general acute care hospitals, and a tertiary care referral center, providing comprehensive health services for both adults and children. The facility is a 719-bed acute care hospital.

The Rhode Island Hospital (RIH) provides comprehensive diagnostic and therapeutic services to inpatients and outpatients, with particular expertise in cardiology, oncology, neurosciences and orthopedics, as well as pediatrics at Hasbro Children's Hospital, its children's hospital which is located on the RIH campus. It is designated as the Level I Trauma Center for southeastern New England.

== Hasbro Children's Hospital ==
Hasbro Children's Hospital
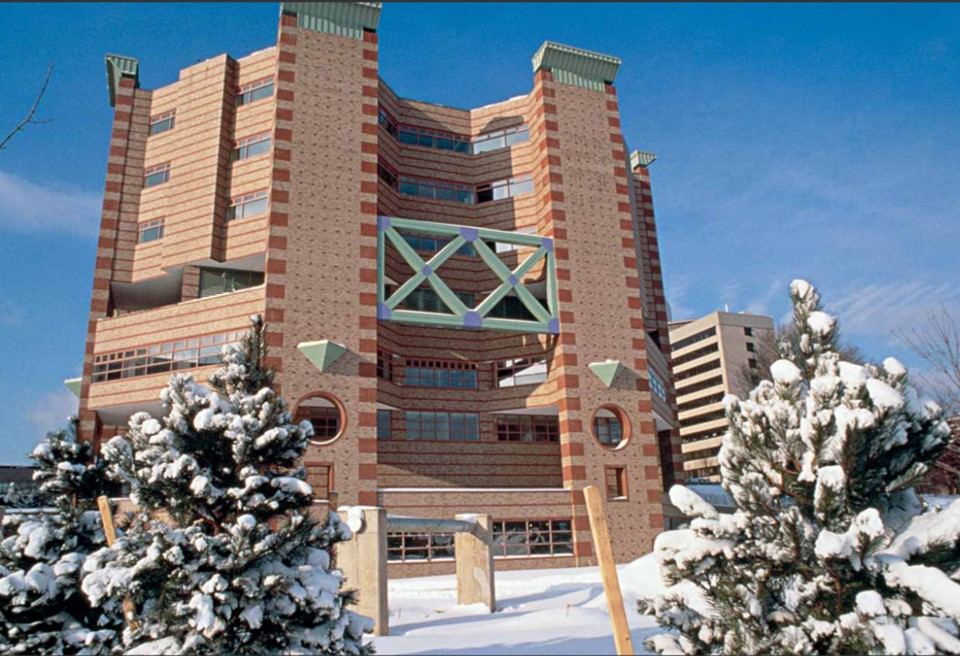

Organisation
- Type: Teaching
- Affiliated university: Warren Alpert Medical School of Brown University

Services
- Emergency department: Level 1 Pediatric Trauma Center
- Beds: 63
- Speciality: Children's Hospital

History
- Founded: 1994

Links
- Website: Hasbro Children's Website

Hasbro Children's Hospital is the largest of two children's hospitals' in Rhode Island and provides services to the Rhode Island and southern New England. The hospital has 63 beds and provides comprehensive pediatric specialties and subspecialties to patients aged 0–21. The hospital is affiliated with the Warren Alpert Medical School of Brown University. Hasbro Children's also features a Level I Pediatric Trauma Center.

=== History ===
The hospital was first proposed in 1989 when overcrowding and a lack of modern amenities in the old children's ward became obvious. The old pediatric wing was not designed with parents in mind and as a part of the healthcare team therefore parents were not able to comfortably sleep next to their children. Alan and Stephen Hassenfeld, the owners of the Rhode Island-based Hasbro toy company, helped start a campaign to raise money for the new hospital. The campaign raised over $23 million in the first 3 years with large contributions from the Hassenfeld family. The design of the new hospital was also heavily impacted by the Hassenfelds' down to the color palette, stating that since the hospital would bear their name they wanted a say in the non-medical related design aspects. The input helped create a non threatening friendly atmosphere for patients and families. The hospital ceremoniously opened on Valentine's Day 1994 to great fanfare.

== See also ==
- List of hospitals in Rhode Island
