= Bradley Hospital =

Behavioral health hospital in Rhode Island, US

Coordinates: 41.792369°N 71.367544°W

- Brown University Health
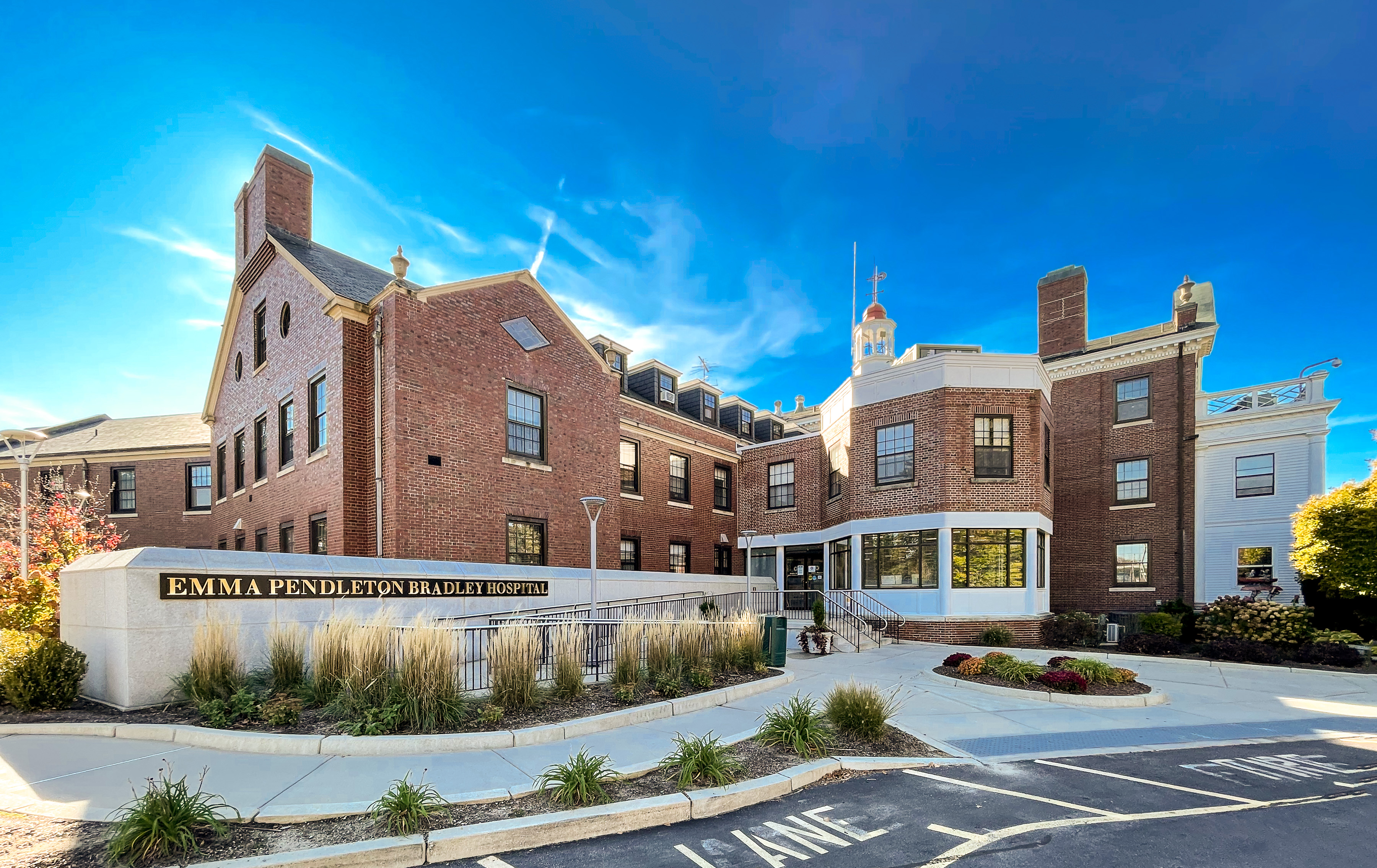

Geography
- Location: East Providence, Rhode Island, United States

Organization
- Care system: Private
- Type: Specialist
- Affiliated university: The Warren Alpert Medical School of Brown University

Services
- Emergency department: No
- Speciality: Pediatric neuropsychiatry

History
- Founded: 1931

Links
- Website: www.brownhealth.org/locations/bradley-hospital
- Lists: Hospitals in Rhode Island

Emma Pendleton Bradley Hospital, known as Bradley Hospital, is in East Providence, Rhode Island. As of 2024, it is the only psychiatric hospital devoted to children.

A member of Brown University Health and teaching hospital for The Warren Alpert Medical School of Brown University, Bradley Hospital has established itself as the national center for training and research in child and adolescent psychiatry. It trains the next generation of behavioral health clinicians and investigates the causes of children’s mental health problems to develop effective therapies for improving their lives.

Bradley Hospital is a private, not-for-profit hospital. Its subsidiary, Lifespan School Solutions, is the parent corporation of the Bradley Schools and provides services to other programs as well. They provide special education oversight, clinical coordination, technical assistance and administrative support to the schools.

== Areas of activity ==
Beginning as young as six weeks old through adolescence, children and families at Bradley Hospital can receive treatment for a range of mental and behavioral health issues. In 2023, the hospital serviced 780 patient discharges, 2,622 outpatient visits, and 2,717 home heal care visits.

Areas of treatment include:

- Anxiety
- Attention Deficit Disorder
- Autism Spectrum Disorder
- Bipolar Disorder
- Communication and Sensory Processing Disorders
- Co-Occurring Disorders
- Depression
- Eating Disorders
- Feeding Disorders
- Neuropsychology
- Obsessive Compulsive Disorder
- Risk Behaviors
- Trauma
- Psychosis
- Schizophrenia
- Self Harm
- Sleep Disorders
- Suicidality

== History ==
Bradley Hospital opened in 1931 as the first children’s psychiatric hospital in the United States. The hospital was named for George and Helen Bradley's only child, Emma Pendleton Bradley, who was diagnosed with encephalitis at the age of seven. The disease left her with multiple disabilities, including epilepsy, intellectual disability and cerebral palsy. This tragedy sparked the Bradleys to conduct a worldwide search for a cure or a treatment for Emma's condition. Because psychiatry and neurology were in their infancy, hospitals were solely for adults and pediatric services were not yet available. The Bradleys arranged around-the-clock medical care for Emma at their summer home in Pomfret, Connecticut.

After eighteen years of treatment, Emma showed no improvement. George and Helen began to accept their daughter's fate, but wanted to ensure that other families would not share their family's struggle. In their wills, both George and Helen Bradley requested that the Baton House, the family's Providence estate, be converted into a treatment facility for children. The board of trustees decided that more space and a less urban setting were necessary for the institution, and so the home on Eaton Street was sold and 35 acres of wooded land was purchased on the Barrington Parkway. The ground was broken in 1929, and two years later the institution opened its doors.

== See also ==
- List of hospitals in Rhode Island
