= Miriam Hospital =

Hospital in Rhode Island, US

Coordinates: 41.8523°N 71.3977°W

The Miriam Hospital
- Brown University Health
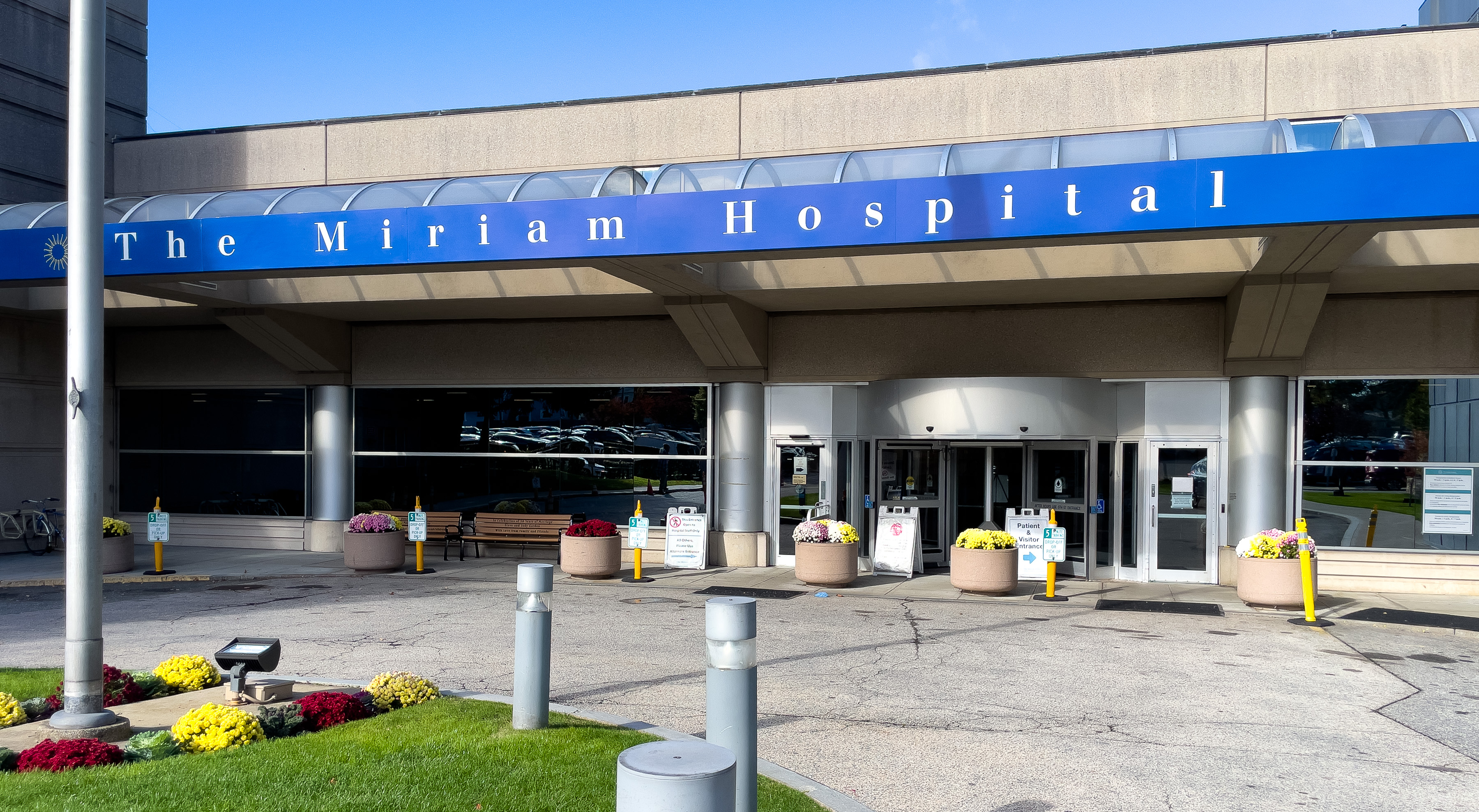

Geography
- Location: Providence, Rhode Island, United States

Organization
- Care system: Private
- Type: Teaching
- Affiliated university: Warren Alpert Medical School of Brown University

Services
- Emergency department: Yes
- Beds: 247

History
- Founded: 1926

Links
- Website: www.brownhealth.org/locations/miriam-hospital
- Lists: Hospitals in Rhode Island

The Miriam Hospital is a private, not-for-profit hospital at 164 Summit Avenue in Providence, in the U.S. state of Rhode Island. It is a major teaching affiliate of the Warren Alpert Medical School of Brown University.

== History ==
In 1902, a handful of women began collecting coins to raise $1,000 for the down payment on "a place to care for the indigent sick of the Jewish faith."

Since then, extraordinary generosity has been the catalyst for The Miriam Hospital. To fulfill the women's dream, 450 people joined their cause. The women went door to door, raising $80,000 in four weeks. Their efforts lead to first Miriam Hospital opening in 1926 with 63 beds and 14 bassinets.

A year later, another $82,000 was raised to help defray the "burdens of caring for charity patients."

These first fundraising efforts were only the beginning of a partnership between The Miriam Hospital and the community; a relationship that has endured for generations. When the need to expand beyond a small, neighborhood hospital became evident, friends who had been raising money for linens and surgical supplies came forward to launch a major building fund drive. Although the drive and search for a suitable building were interrupted by the war years, $1.3 million was eventually raised. The new 150-bed Miriam Hospital opened on Summit Avenue in 1952.

The Miriam Hospital is currently part of the Brown University Health network formerly named Lifespan until 2024, affiliated with the medical school of Brown University. As of 2010 there are 2,410 employees, 906 affiliated physicians, and 247 licensed beds.

The Miriam Hospital Association was formed by Jewish women sharing a common goal: to alleviate suffering by providing hospital care for Jewish immigrants in surroundings where their language and customs were understood. In 1926, The Miriam Hospital received a charter from the Rhode Island state legislature. As the community grew, so did its need for health care services. The Miriam's transition from a 63-bed hospital on Parade Street to the 247-bed complex on Summit Avenue has been a response to these needs. The new Miriam Hospital was dedicated on April 24, 1966, "... to serve all the people of Rhode Island, regardless of race, creed, origin or economic means."

Throughout the years, The Miriam Hospital Association, now known as The Miriam Hospital Women's Association, has played a major role in the development of the hospital, and continued fundraising, volunteer programs, networking resources, providing invaluable assistance to the hospital and the community. It may be the first and perhaps only hospital initially founded and funded by women (distinguished from other hospitals for the care of women, or, staffed primarily by women). Currently, top staff are women, and it is affiliated with Brown University Medical School.

The hospital is the subject of a book with many photographs, documenting the founding of the Miriam Hospital.

=== Miriam Hospital Controversy (1980s) ===
In the early 1980s, Miriam Hospital in Providence, Rhode Island, became the focus of legal and ethical scrutiny following a controversy involving overbilling practices. The issue arose after the hospital upgraded its blood testing equipment from a 6-channel analyzer to a 12-channel analyzer in 1980. Due to a computer programming error, patients were billed for tests conducted on both machines, despite only the 12-channel analyzer being used.

In 1982, Blue Cross auditors flagged the unusually high laboratory charges at Miriam Hospital, prompting further investigation. Although hospital administrators initially attributed the charges to higher test volumes, a subsequent internal audit revealed that the double-billing error had been intentionally reinstated by senior officials after an initial correction was ordered. Evidence later showed that the hospital's management attempted to conceal the issue by altering computer records and providing sanitized documentation to auditors.

The overbilling, which amounted to approximately $2.8 million, led to legal action. A grand jury indicted the hospital and several senior managers on charges including conspiracy, filing false documents, and obtaining money under false pretenses. While there was no evidence that the administrators personally profited from the scheme, their actions significantly undermined trust in the institution and raised questions about the ethical obligations of healthcare management.

This case highlighted the importance of transparency and accountability in healthcare financial practices, serving as a cautionary example for the industry.

==== Notes ====
1. Providence Journal-Bulletin. Articles dated September 22, 1983; October 2, 5, and 6, 1983; and May 16, 1984.
2. Darr, Kurt. Ethics in Health Services Management, Fifth Edition. Health Professions Press, Inc., 2011, pp. 134–136.
3. Clark, Cheryl. "99% of Teaching Hospitals Lack Clinical Care Conflict of Interest Policies." HealthLeaders Media, July 1, 2010. Retrieved October 24, 2010, from HealthLeaders Media.
- In 2018, Miriam Hospital received a $2.5 million federal grant to partner with Project Weber/RENEW and the Rhode Island Public Health Institute to create Rhode Island's first substance use treatment program for gay and bisexual Black and Latino men.

== Treatment ==
The mission of The Miriam Hospital is to inspire one another to improve the health and spirit of the lives they touch.

== See also ==
- List of hospitals in Rhode Island

== Sources ==
- Brian C. Jones, "The Miriam Hospital, a gift to the city: the history of the Miriam Hospital, Providence, Rhode Island." (2011), Pub. Miriam Hospital, Providence, RI, OCLC 772628321
