= Memorial Hospital of Rhode Island =

- Care New England
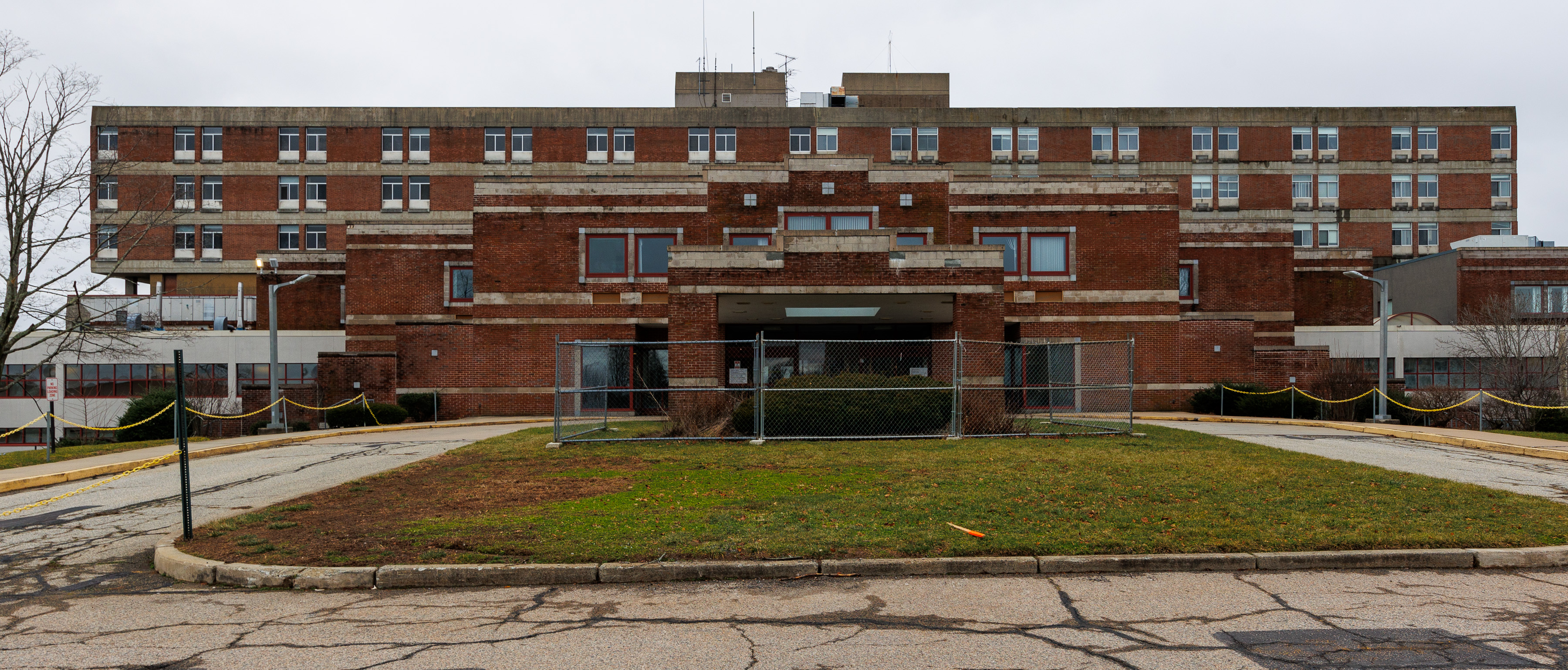

Geography
- Location: Pawtucket, Rhode Island, United States
- Coordinates: 41.86991°N 71.37644°W

Organization
- Care system: Private
- Type: Teaching
- Affiliated university: Warren Alpert Medical School of Brown University

Services
- Beds: 294

History
- Opened: 1894
- Closed: 2018

Links
- Website: http://www.mhri.org
- Lists: Hospitals in Rhode Island

The Memorial Hospital of Rhode Island was a hospital in Pawtucket, Rhode Island, USA.

== History ==
The hospital was founded through an 1894 bequest from William F. Sayles, a businessman and philanthropist who owned mills in Saylesville, Rhode Island. Sayles' son, Frank A. Sayles, decided to build the original 30-bed hospital with the funds. Throughout the 20th century the size of the hospital expanded greatly. The hospital was a 294-bed facility serving the Blackstone Valley of Rhode Island and Southeastern Massachusetts. Memorial Hospital was a teaching affiliate of the Warren Alpert Medical School of Brown University. Other smaller facilities are located in Quality Hill, Plainville and Central Falls. In 2013 Memorial Hospital of Rhode Island merged with the Care New England (CNE) Health System, in affiliation with: Kent County Hospital, Women & Infants Hospital of Rhode Island, and Butler Hospital.

== Closure ==
On October 18, 2017, Care New England announced its plans to close Memorial Hospital, which had been struggling financially for the previous ten years. The financial decline accelerated after mismanagement by Care New England after they acquired the hospital in 2013. This was worsened by the creation of new ambulatory CNE practices within the traditional catchment area of MHRI that funneled patients away from Memorial and to CNE's other member hospitals. This enabled CNE to create a situation in which patient volume decreased at Memorial Hospital, which in turn could be used as an excuse to further downsize. In the summer of 2016, the maternity ward was closed. The hospital's intensive care unit was closed in December 2017 and its emergency room was closed on January 1, 2018. The building was transitioned into an outpatient care center to cut costs.

In April 2018, CharterCare announced plans to purchase Memorial Hospital, but Care New England expressed doubt as to whether the hospital could be re-opened.

== See also ==
- List of hospitals in Rhode Island
