= John Galt (physician) =

American physician (1819–1862)

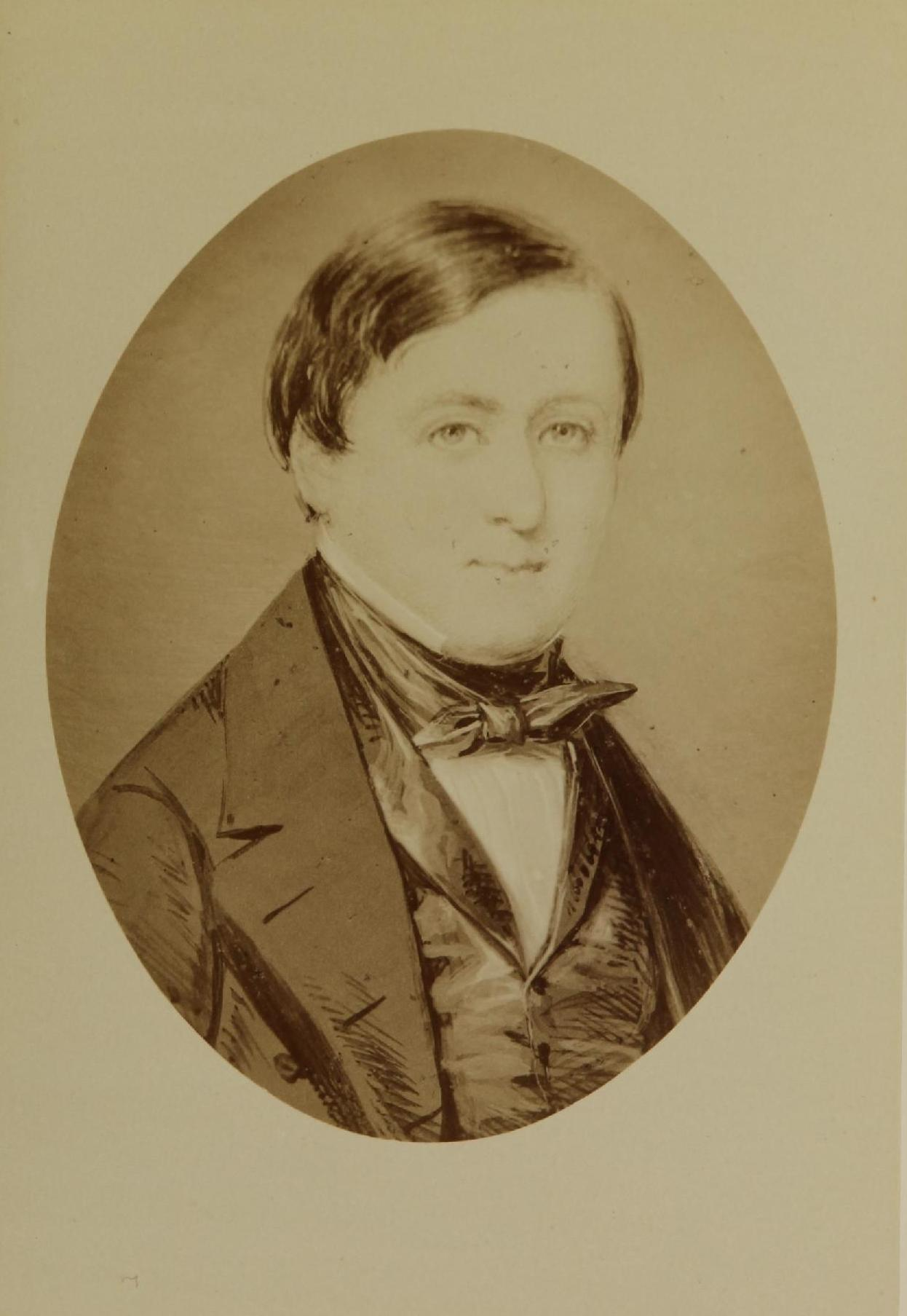
- Born: March 19, 1819; Williamsburg, Virginia
- Died: May 18, 1862 (aged 43)
- Occupations: Physician and superintendent of the Eastern State Hospital

John Minson Galt II (19 March 1819 – 18 May 1862) was a medical doctor who served as superintendent of the Eastern State Hospital in Williamsburg, Virginia. He was an important figure in the asylum reform movement who practiced and wrote about ideas that adhered to moral therapy. Galt considered himself as an expert on the mental health of African Americans. His views about race and slavery alienated him from his medical contemporaries.

== Early life and education ==
John Minson Galt II was born on March 19 1819 in Williamsburg, Virginia. His father was Alexander Dickie Galt (1771-1840), who served as the attending physician at the Hospital for the Insane at Williamsburg in succession to his father John M. Galt (1744-1808). Through his father, Galt was the descendent of Covenanters who were said to have been banished from Scotland in 1664. Also through his father, he was related to Bertrand Servant or Servienti, a French Huguenot who was a member of the House of Burgesses. His mother was Mary Dorothea Galt; his parents were third cousins.

As a teenager, Galt would accompany his father during his work at the hospital. Galt was first educated at William and Mary College. He then attended the Medical College of the University of Pennsylvania. During this time, he wrote to his family about his observations of the differences between the northern and southern states: for example, he opined that abolitionism faced much more opposition in the North.

== Career ==
=== Eastern State Hospital superintendency ===
The death of Galt's father in 1840 opened a vacancy for a new superintendent at the Eastern State Hospital. Galt was not officially appointed to the job until 1 June 1841. This is because of a new piece of Virginia legislature, mandated on 6 March 1841, which ordered that hospital superintendents must be physicians. The Eastern State Hospital thus delayed appointing anew superintendent until Galt had completed his medical education and become qualified to take up the most. He was 22 years old at this time.

Prior to Galt's superintendency, the Eastern State Hospital used outdated practices on its patients including restraint and blistering; it was only after his appointment that the methods of moral therapy were introduced. He oversaw the creation of rooms devoted to crafts such as carpentry and fibre arts, a garden, a games room and a library. Galt introduced bibliotherapy to the Eastern State Hospital. He not only viewed reading as a method of distraction and a suitable way for patients to pass time, but he also expressed that the provision of reading materials was an act of kindness. He encouraged the Bible to be available for patients to read. He also experimented with hydrotherapy and electric shock therapy. Kindness was a principle that inspired Galt. This is exemplified in the anecdotes that he reportedly refused increases to his salary and that he would feed his patients himself.

Under Galt, the Eastern State Hospital became the first hospital in the United States to admit nonwhite patients, and enslaved patients from Virginia and North Carolina were treated at the hospital.

For a period of ten years, the institution was desegregated. His opinions about desegregation put him in opposition with his contemporaries, including figures such as Thomas Story Kirkbride and Amariah Brigham. Despite this, Galt was not an abolitionist. He valued slavery, claiming that the enforcement of hard labour would protect the mind from insanity. Galt employed enslaved African Americans at the Eastern State Hospital: he paid a salary to their enslavers but also often paid enslaved staff members a small sum too. Enslaved members of the hospital staff were given the least pleasant jobs, including the care of incontinent patients, though they were also entrusted with the possession of keys and administration of medicines, placing them in a position of power.

As his career progressed, Galt developed an interest in deinstitutionalization and that made him a controversial figure in contemporary medical circles. Drawing inspiration from practices in Geel, Galt implemented a community integration programme at the Eastern State Hospital. Under this programme, stable patients were permitted to leave the hospital and visit Williamsburg, while the Williamsburg townspeople were invited to visit the hospital. In his view, this would reaffirm the patients' sense of dignity. This programme lasted for ten years.

=== The Association of Medical Superintendents of American Institutions for the Insane ===
Galt was one of the founders of the Association of Medical Superintendents of American Institutions for the Insane (AMSAII), a predecessor to the American Psychiatric Association. He was the youngest of the 13 founding members, being aged only 25 at the time of its establishment on 16 October 1844.

In May 1844, Galt was appointed chairman of an AMSAII committee created to investigate the creation of asylums for African Americans. Other members of this committee included Isaac Ray and Francis T. Stribling.

=== Publications ===
Galt was a voluminous writer. He produced several hundred papers about psychiatric care. In 1844, he made his first contribution to the American Journal of Insanity with the article Fragments of Insanity. He was the first American to write an article about the benefits of bibliotherapy, and Philip J. Weimerskirch called the publication of his lecture On Reading, Recreation and Amusements for the Insane as an overlooked "landmark in the history of bibliotherapy". He also wrote papers about botany.

His most famous publication was his 1846 book The Treatment of Insanity, which synthesized information from French, British and American research. It is thought that the portion of the book that features Philippe Pinel's writing was translated from French to English personally by Galt.

In his book Political Essays, published in 1852, he levelled an extensive criticism of abolitionism.

== Death and legacy ==
Galt died from an overdose on 18 May 1862, soon after the Eastern State Hospital was captured by Union soldiers. He was 43 years old. It has been theorised that his death was compounded by the stress experienced during this event because Galt was forbidden to see his patients during it. He is buried in the Bruton Parish Church in Colonial Williamsburg.

Galt's decision to commit suicide was criticised by some of his contemporaries: they viewed it as him abandoning his patients during a vulnerable period. Due to the damaged caused by the American Civil War, many of Galt's progressive policies at the Eastern State Hospital were undone after his death.

At the 1897 meeting of the American Medico-Psychological Association, Theophilus Orgain Powell expressed sorrow that Galt's death ended the nearly century-long Galt dynasty of psychiatric care. He compared their collective legacy to that of the Tuke family. On Galt's interest in deinstitutionalization, psychiatrist James S. Reinhart praised him as being "100 years ahead of his time".

Although it has been argued that Galt was strongly influenced by the practices of English and French asylums, this view has been challenged with the assertion that Galt was instead inspired by asylums in the northern United States, which made the Eastern State Hospital markedly progressive in comparison to other southern asylums.
