= Thomas Aspinwall =

Thomas Aspinwall may refer to:

- Thomas Aspinwall (consul) (1786–1876), American consul
- Thomas Aspinwall (trade unionist) (1846–1901), English trade unionist

== See also ==
- Thomas Aspinwall Davis (1798–1845), American businessman and mayor of Boston
