= Association of Medical Superintendents of American Institutions for the Insane =

Predecessor of the American Psychiatric Association

The Association of Medical Superintendents of American Institutions for the Insane, also known as The Superintendents' Association, was organized in Philadelphia in October, 1844 at a meeting of 13 superintendents, making it the first professional medical specialty organization in the U.S.

The objectives of the Association were "to communicate their experiences to each other, cooperate in collecting statistical information relating to insanity, and assist each other in improving the treatment of the insane." The name of the organization was changed in 1892 to The American Medico-Psychological Association to allow assistant physicians working in mental hospitals to become members. In 1921, the name was changed to the present American Psychiatric Association.

== The original thirteen ==
At a meeting in 1844 in Philadelphia, thirteen superintendents and organizers of insane asylums and hospitals formed the Association of Medical Superintendents of American Institutions for the Insane (AMSAII). The group included Thomas Kirkbride, creator of the asylum model which was used throughout the United States.

It was chartered to focus "primarily on the administration of hospitals and how that affected the care of patients", as opposed to conducting research or promoting the profession.

At the meeting they passed the first proposition of the new organization: "It is the unanimous sense of this convention that the attempt to abandon entirely the use of all means of personal restraint is not sanctioned by the true interests of the insane."

The list of the "original thirteen" members and their organizations provide a good index to well-established psychiatric institutions in the U.S. as of 1844. They included:

- Samuel B. Woodward of Worcester State Hospital, Massachusetts
- Isaac Ray of the Maine State Hospital for the Insane, Augusta, Maine, and also of Butler Hospital, Providence, Rhode Island
- Luther V. Bell of the McLean Asylum at Somerville Massachusetts
- Charles H. Stedman of the Boston Lunatic Asylum
- John S. Butler of the Boston Lunatic Asylum and also of the Hartford Retreat, Connecticut
- Amariah Brigham of the Hartford Retreat, and also of the State Lunatic Asylum, Utica New York
- Pliny Earle of the Bloomingdale Asylum, New York City
- T.S. Kirkbride of the Pennsylvania Hospital, Philadelphia, Pennsylvania
- William M. Awl of the State Hospital at Columbus, Ohio
- F.T. Stribling of the Western Hospital of Virginia at Staunton Virginia
- John M. Galt of the Eastern Lunatic Asylum at Williamsburg Virginia
- Nehemiah Cutter of a private institution in Pepperell Massachusetts
- Samuel White of a private institution at Hudson New York

== The American Journal of Insanity ==
The American Journal of Insanity (AJI) was first published in June, 1844, by Amariah Brigham, Superintendent of the New York State Lunatic Asylum at Utica. He was said to have been the author of the entire first issue, which included six articles, a list of existing mental asylums in the U.S., and notes on insanity from France. His aim for The Journal was to acquaint its readers with the nature and varieties of mental illness and with methods of prevention and care for patients.

The AJI remained the property of the Utica State Hospital, though it served as the official publication of the Superintendents’ Association. In 1892, the journal was bought by The Association, and in July 1943 the name was changed to the present American Journal of Psychiatry by The American Psychiatric Association.

== Relations with the American Medical Association ==
The American Medical Association (AMA) was organized in 1847 in Philadelphia through the efforts of Nathan Davis and Nathaniel Chapman primarily to deal with the lack of regulations and standards in medical education and medical practice. Some mental hospital superintendents became active members. Cordial relations between the two groups continued, and members of each attended the others’ meetings.

In 1854, the AMA established a Committee on Insanity which ended in 1867, when a psychology section was organized. Merger of the AMA and the Superintendents’ Association was considered frequently over the years. In 1871, the Superintendents' Association delegated Dr. John Curwen to attend the AMA meeting in San Francisco and explain The Association's rejection of the invitation to a merger. The reasons were that the Superintendents held their annual meeting in a venue where an asylum was located both to assure citizen interest in the care of the insane and to allow the superintendents to visit the asylum. Also, the Association's meetings were devoted solely to topics relating to the care of the mentally ill, an area of limited interest to general practitioners, and the Association included only psychiatric hospital superintendents.

Over the years, the relationship between the two organizations has waxed and waned. In the 21st century, the APA is an active participant in AMA activities.

== The neurologists, S. Weir Mitchell, and The Superintendents' Association ==
The American Neurological Association, organized in 1875, grew out of the Civil War experiences of physicians who had been involved in caring for soldiers with traumatic injuries of the brain and nerves. The neurologists were mainly in private practice and considered mental illness within their purview because the brain was involved. Relations between the neurologists and the Superintendents' Association were marked by mistrust and hostility. Believing that the asylums were mismanaged and providing inadequate care to patients, in some places, the neurologists called on state legislatures to investigate the asylums.

In 1894, to mark the 50th anniversary of its founding, The Superintendents' Association invited Dr. S. Weir Mitchell, a prominent Philadelphia neurologist to address the annual meeting. After querying a number of his colleagues, Dr. Mitchell delivered a scathing address to the superintendents. He said that they had isolated themselves from medicine and they sought no new scientific information through their work, their medical records were inadequate, and their educational efforts among the profession were minimal. The superintendents made little reply to the address.

In 1897, Dr. Bernard Sachs, a New York neurologist, was invited to address the Association's annual meeting. He gave a placating speech saying that both professional groups should be working together in the interest of patients.

== Sources ==
- Adapted from public domain text at "Diseases of the Mind: Highlights in American Psychiatry Through 1900". US National Library of Medicine.
