= Asylum architecture in the United States =

Building design of mental hospitals

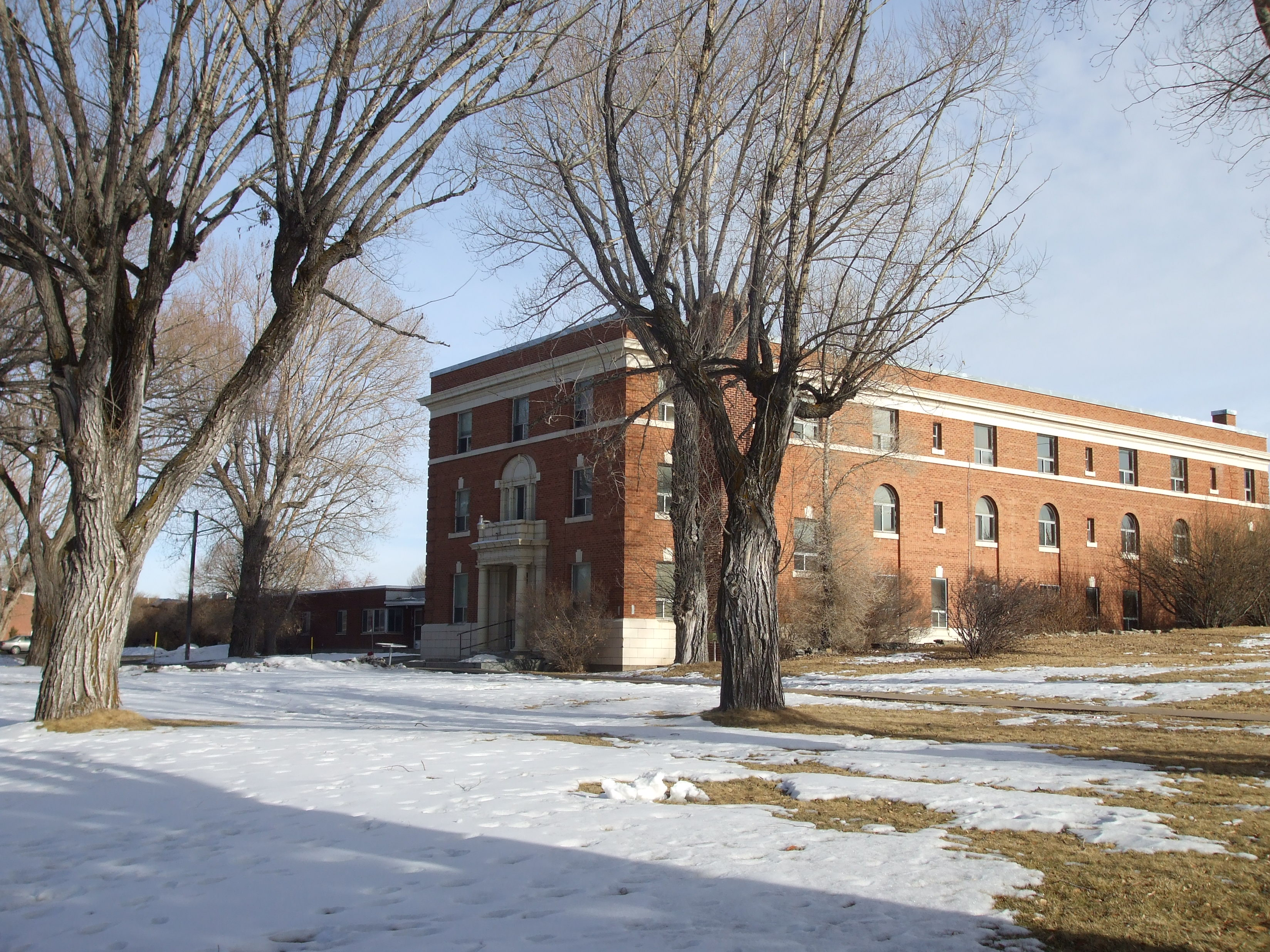
Wyoming State Insane Asylum in Evanston, Wyoming

Asylum architecture in the United States, including the architecture of psychiatric hospitals, affected the changing methods of treating the mentally ill in the nineteenth century: the architecture was considered part of the cure. Doctors believed that ninety percent of insanity cases were curable, but only if treated outside the home, in large-scale buildings. Nineteenth-century psychiatrists considered the architecture of asylums, especially their planning, to be one of the most powerful tools for the treatment of the insane, targeting social as well as biological factors to facilitate the treatment of mental illnesses. The construction and usage of these quasi-public buildings served to legitimize developing ideas in psychiatry. About 300 psychiatric hospitals, known at the time as insane asylums or colloquially as “loony bins” or “nuthouses,” were constructed in the United States before 1900. Asylum architecture is notable for the way similar floor plans were built in a wide range of architectural styles.

== Theory and development of asylum architecture ==
The medical profession of psychiatry, known as "Asylum Medicine" from about 1830 on, in insane hospitals was instrumental in the planning and development of asylum architecture. Nineteenth-century philosophers and architectural theorists argued that the natural and built environment shaped behavior. The doctors who promoted the establishment of mental hospitals used the same rhetoric as social reformers and park enthusiasts: that nature was curative, exercise therapeutic, and the city a source of vice. Early psychiatrists assumed that mental derangement was caused by environmental factors, particularly the tensions present in the individual's current domestic or social environment, which in turn suggested that a changed setting might alleviate psychic pain. Psychiatrists, also known as medical superintendents, collaborated with architects to enhance the new social environment of the insane asylum. A series of plans, such as the Kirkbride plan and the Cottage plan, resulted from this collaboration, developed using theories that would help facilitate the treatment of patients.

=== Kirkbride Plan ===
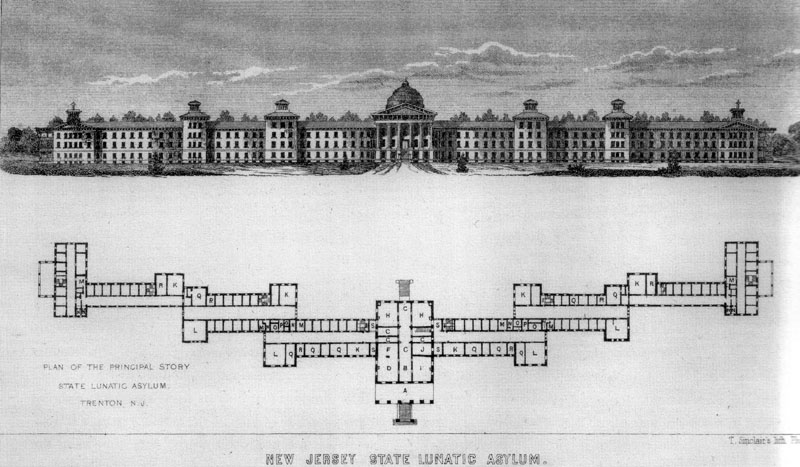
1848 lithograph of the Kirkbride design of the Trenton State Hospital

The Quaker reformers, including Samuel Tuke, who promoted the moral treatment, as it was called, argued that patients should be unchained, granted respect, encouraged to perform occupational tasks (like farming, carpentry, or laundry), and allowed to stroll the grounds with an attendant and attend occasional dances. While the moral treatment could, with difficulty, be employed in an old house or adapted almshouse, this situation was considered a sad compromise. In the United States, doctors developed a highly specialized building type for 250 patients. Dr. Thomas Story Kirkbride devised a widely applicable set of planning principles that ensured classification by type of illness, ease of surveillance, short wards for good ventilation, and clarity of circulation.Kirkbride Buildings

The buildings helped establish psychiatry as a profession, because the asylum was the only setting for the practice of psychiatry in the nineteenth century, there were no out-patient visits, no doctors’ offices. Professional medical journals were replete with articles on architecture, a constant preoccupation for the asylum superintendent, and architects ventured opinions about the proper classification of patients.

=== Cottage Plan ===
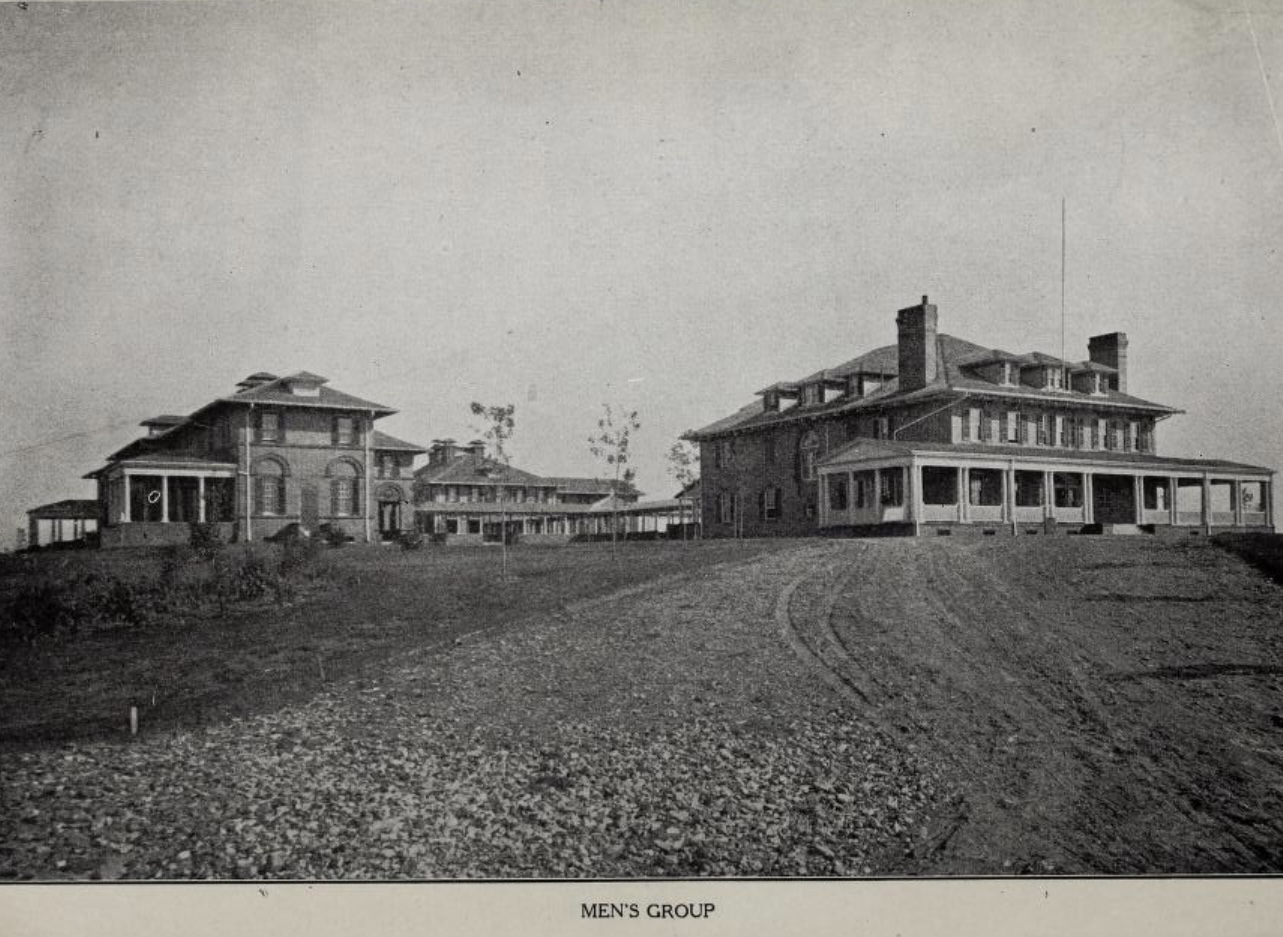
Men's Group at the Springfield State Hospital, Sykesville, Maryland

The Cottage Plan, also called the linear plan, dominated asylum building. It tended to produce very large, long structures. By the middle of the nineteenth century, some doctors complained that large monolithic asylums had not lived up to their expectations. But psychiatrists did not immediately abandon their belief in the therapeutic environment; instead, they argued for a different therapeutic environment. They proposed smaller cottage-like structures to replace the Kirkbride-plan hospitals. These cottages were to be arranged in a village, an homage to the Belgian town of Gheel, where citizens looked after mentally ill people who for centuries gathered there to worship at the shrine of St. Dymphna, the patron saint of lunatics. Dr. John Galt romanticized this medieval model as an ideal setting for the cure of the disease, thus causing a rift among the self-named “brethren” of asylum superintendents.

The cottages varied in size from those which accommodated six to a dozen patients to larger ones which accommodated 20 or more. They were usually constructed either in groups or along streets and avenues as a village. In the group arrangement, the several groups were given up to a particular industry as a farm group, where the patients were employed at farming, and others, as the garden, the brick yard, shop industries, etc., all of these being a part of one institution on a single large estate. In the village plan, the institution was laid off in streets and avenues, and had the appearance of an ordinary village, each cottage having a flower garden in front, shade trees, etc. In either plan, there was conveniently located near the center of the plant an administration building, a hospital for the sick and those requiring special care, a bakery, a laundry and other utility buildings. The cost of construction was small as compared with older plans of asylum construction.

This approach was viewed as more homelike, more convenient for administration and as permitting indefinite expansion. Some of the best known institutions constructed on this plan were the Springfield State Hospital at Sykesville, Maryland; Alt-Scherbitz near Leipzig; Gabersee near Munich, Germany; the Saint Lawrence State Hospital at Ogdensburg, New York; the Lakeshore Psychiatric Hospital in Etobicoke, Ontario; and the Craig Colony for Epileptics at Sonyea, New York.

=== Other ===
Some doctors proposed that the insane be treated on farms or in the community, which is some ways was a precursor to "Care in the Community" in the twentieth century. The concept was notably different, however, from de-institutionalization of the latter half of the twentieth century.

== First purpose-built asylum ==
The first purpose-built asylum in the United States was the Public Hospital in Virginia of 1770. It housed mentally ill people as well as developmentally disabled people. The Public Hospital was reconstructed in 1986. It is now a museum at Colonial Williamsburg.

The first purpose-built asylum in the United Kingdom was Bethel Hospital, Bethel Street in Norwich, Norfolk, England. Founded and built by Mary Chapman (1647–1724), who was the wife of Reverend Samuel Chapman and built wholly at her own expense in 1713. The plan for the building was along an "H" block architectural design style.

== Major architects and the Kirkbride Plan ==
At the peak of the success of the Kirkbride plan, these hospitals were technological marvels that demonstrated advanced fireproof construction, state-of-the-art heating and ventilation, and fresh water delivery systems; some had their own railroads. They were surrounded by well-designed picturesque gardens that predate many public parks. Accomplished architects, including John Haviland, John Notman, Andrew Jackson Downing, Samuel Sloan, Thomas U. Walter, Frederick Clarke Withers, Calvert Vaux, Frederick Law Olmsted, and H.H. Richardson designed asylum grounds and buildings.

== Decline ==
The complicated decline of the large-scale insane asylum was caused partly by overcrowding and neglect, but also by massive changes in the practice of psychiatry. With the ascent of neurology, which focused attention on mental illness as a result of physical causes, the environment ceased to seem like an important cause or likely cure, and a new generation of doctors regarded architecture as irrelevant to the practice of psychiatric medicine.

== See also ==
- History of psychiatric institutions
