= 1856 Massachusetts gubernatorial election =

- November 4, 1856
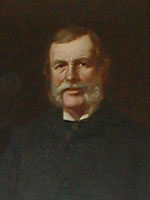

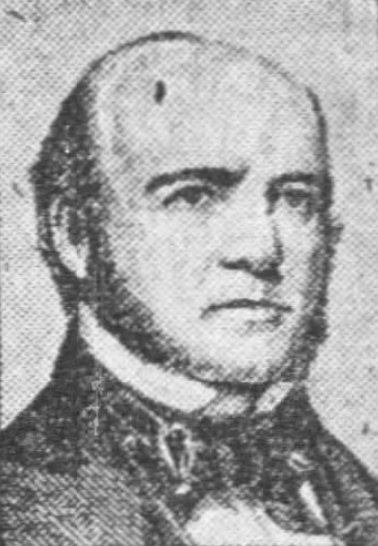

Nominee	Henry J. Gardner	Erasmus Beach	George W. Gordon
Party	Know Nothing	Democratic	Know Nothing
Alliance	Republican
Popular vote	92,467	40,082	10,385
Percentage	58.92%	25.54%	6.62%
- County results Gardner: 40–50% 50–60% 60–70% 70–80%
Governor before election
Henry J. Gardner
Know Nothing
Elected Governor
Henry J. Gardner
Know Nothing

The 1856 Massachusetts gubernatorial election on November 4. Incumbent Know-Nothing governor Henry J. Gardner was re-elected to a third term. He benefited greatly from a deal with the state's new Republican Party, which agreed not to field a candidate in exchange for Gardner's support of presidential nominee John C. Frémont. With no serious challenger in the field against him, Gardner easily defeated Democrat Erasmus Beach and George W. Gordon, an American Party member running in support of the national ticket.

This was the last election in which the Know-Nothing won a Massachusetts gubernatorial election.

This was the last election in which the Whig Party participated.

== Whig convention ==
=== Candidates ===
- Thomas Aspinwall, former U.S. consul at London (1816–54)
- Luther Vose Bell, superintendent of McLean Asylum and candidate for U.S. representative in 1852 and 1854

1856 Massachusetts Whig convention
Party	Candidate	Votes	%
Whig	Luther Vose Bell	215	56.58%
Whig	Thomas Aspinwall	104	27.37%
Whig	Scattering	61	16.05%
Total votes		380	100.00%

== Know-Nothing convention ==
The American Party convention was held at Faneuil Hall, Boston, on July 24, 1856.

=== Candidates ===
- Henry J. Gardner, incumbent governor

1856 Massachusetts Know-Nothing convention
Party	Candidate	Votes	%
Know Nothing	Henry J. Gardner (incumbent)	unanimous	

== General election ==
=== Candidates ===
- Erasmus Beach, nominee for governor in 1855 (Democratic)
- Luther Vose Bell, superintendent of McLean Asylum (Whig)
- Henry J. Gardner, incumbent governor (American)
- George W. Gordon ("Fillmore American")
- Josiah Quincy Jr., former mayor of Boston (Independent)

=== Results ===
1856 Massachusetts gubernatorial election
Party	Candidate	Votes	%	±%
Know Nothing	Henry J. Gardner (incumbent)	92,467	58.92%	N/A
Democratic	Erasmus D. Beach	40,082	25.54%	▲0.10
Know Nothing	George W. Gordon	10,385	6.62%	N/A
Whig	Luther Vose Bell	7,075	4.51%	▼5.23
Independent Republican	Josiah Quincy Jr.	5,625	3.59%	N/A
Scattering	All others	1,291	0.82%	▲0.63
Total votes		136,488	100.00%	
Know Nothing hold		Swing		

== See also ==
- 1856 Massachusetts legislature
