= Luther Vose Bell =

American psychiatrist (1806–1862)

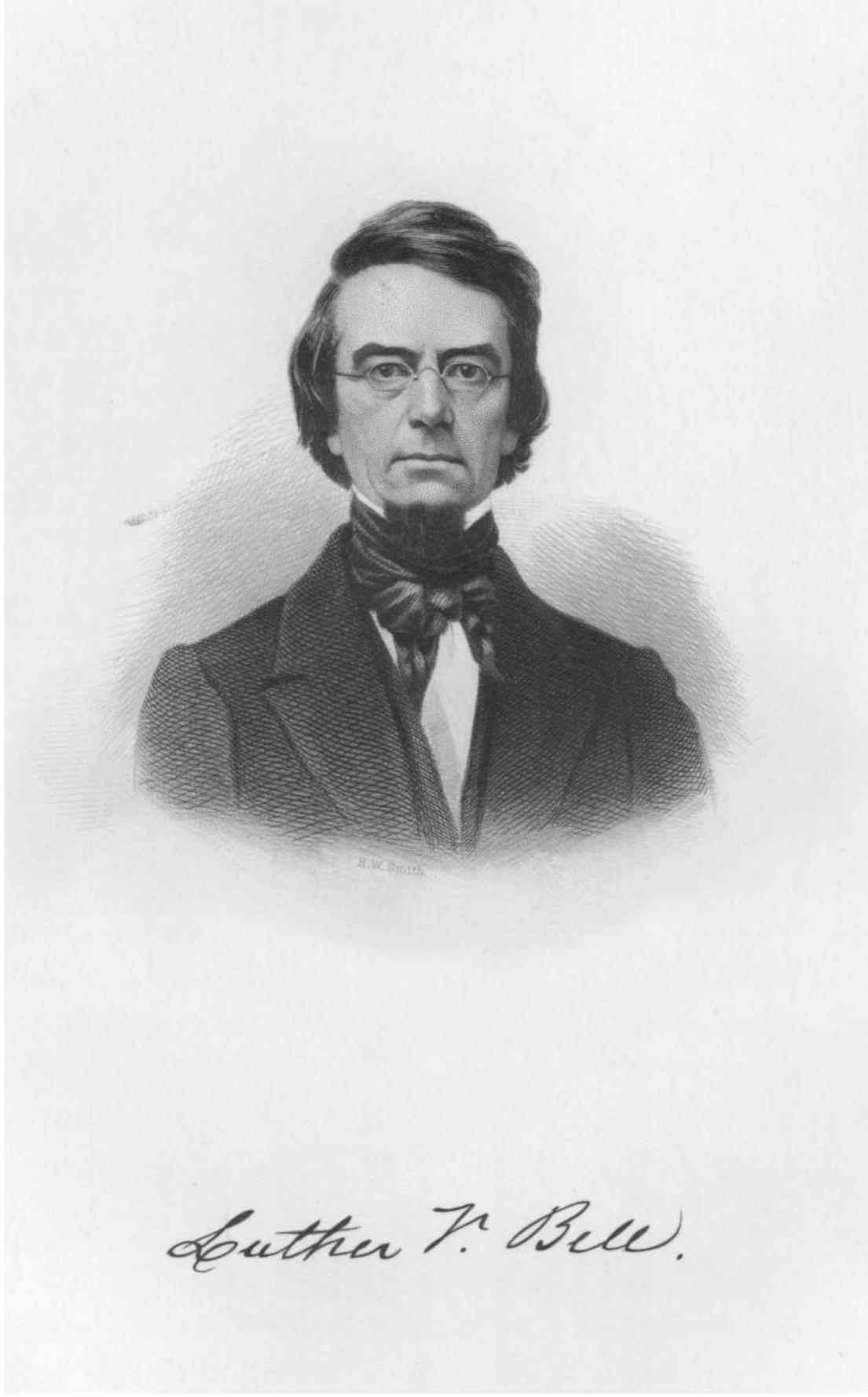
Luther V. Bell

Luther Vose Bell, M.D. (c. 1806 – February 11, 1862) was one of the thirteen mental hospital superintendents who met in Philadelphia in 1844 to organize the Association of Medical Superintendents of American Institutions for the Insane (AMSAII), now the American Psychiatric Association, and the first medical specialty society in the United States. He was also Superintendent of the McLean Asylum near Boston, from 1837 to 1855.

== Early life ==
Bell was born in Francestown, New Hampshire, son of state governor and two-term U.S. Senator Samuel Bell. With his younger brother John, Bell attended Phillips Academy in Andover, Massachusetts, for a year. He then entered Bowdoin College at age 12, and graduated in 1823. He moved to New York to study medicine under his older brother, John, and later received a medical degree from Dartmouth College in 1826. Because of his youth, he worked in New York in business until 1831, when he returned to Derry, New Hampshire, to establish his medical practice.

== Physician ==
In the 1830s, Bell submitted essays for the Boyleston Prize offered by Harvard Medical School. In 1835, he won the prize with an essay on diet, and in 1836, he was one of three winners for his submission, "How Far are the Means of Exploring the Condition of the Internal Organs to be Considered Useful and Important in the Practice of Medicine?" In addition to his medical practice, he carried on the family tradition of serving in politics and public office. He was elected in New Hampshire as a state representative and served on the legislative committee to investigate the status of the insane in New Hampshire. He lobbied vigorously for a state institution. He succeeded when the state legislature authorized its construction in Concord in 1838, and it opened in 1842. He stayed politically active: campaigning for a seat in Massachusetts in 1852 and for governor in 1856, both were unsuccessful.

Dr. Bell's efforts for a state mental institution in New Hampshire became known to the Trustees of McLean Asylum after the death of the then superintendent. In 1836, Bell went to Boston to meet several trustees, and the Board offered him the position. He accepted and began traveling to other asylums. He visited asylums in Worcester, Massachusetts, the Hartford Retreat in Connecticut, and the Bloomingdale Insane Asylum in New York. He assumed office at the McLean Asylum in February 1836.

The McLean Asylum was the first mental hospital in Massachusetts and was established in 1818 as an affiliate of the Massachusetts General Hospital under Dr. Rufus Wyman (1818-1835). Wyman established a treatment program known as "Moral Treatment," which had been instituted by the Quakers in England. Bell continued this treatment method. The establishment of the Worcester asylum under state auspices in 1833 diverted indigent patients from McLean, which allowed the staff there to treat more affluent patients and to provide patients with comforts including occupation and recreation. As the superintendent at McLean, Bell was interested in hospital ventilation, and in 1848 presented the annual address to the Massachusetts Medical Society on this subject.

Bell served as a forensic examiner for the Massachusetts courts. In 1850, he became a member of the Executive Committee to advise the governor in cases of application for the pardon of criminals under sentence. In 1853, he was appointed to a Board of Commissioners to examine convicts in the penitentiary who presented symptoms of mental illness, and attributed cases of mental illness to masturbation. In the 1850s, Bell became interested in spiritualism. Twice he made presentations on this subject at the annual meetings of the AMSAII. He attributed his interest to scientific research but the lack of objective findings led him to abandon his interest. He continued to write papers about the architecture of asylums, statistics of mental hospitals, the use of restraints on patients, and aspects of medical jurisprudence. One of his papers described a new form of mania he had observed which was briefly termed Bell's mania but this later faded away.

In 1844, the Trustees of the proposed Butler Asylum in Rhode Island asked the McLean Trustees to allow Bell to visit asylums in Europe, and then serve as a consultant to the new Butler Hospital. Bell was granted leave by the Board of Trustees of the McLean Asylum, and toured England and France. Upon his return, Bell was offered the superintendence position at Butler Asylum but declined and remained at McLean.

Bell was a firm believer in the efficacy of moral treatment. He wrote to Dorothea Dix, "Each year … has served to diminish my confidence in an active medical treatment of almost every form of disease of the mind and to increase my reliance on moral means."

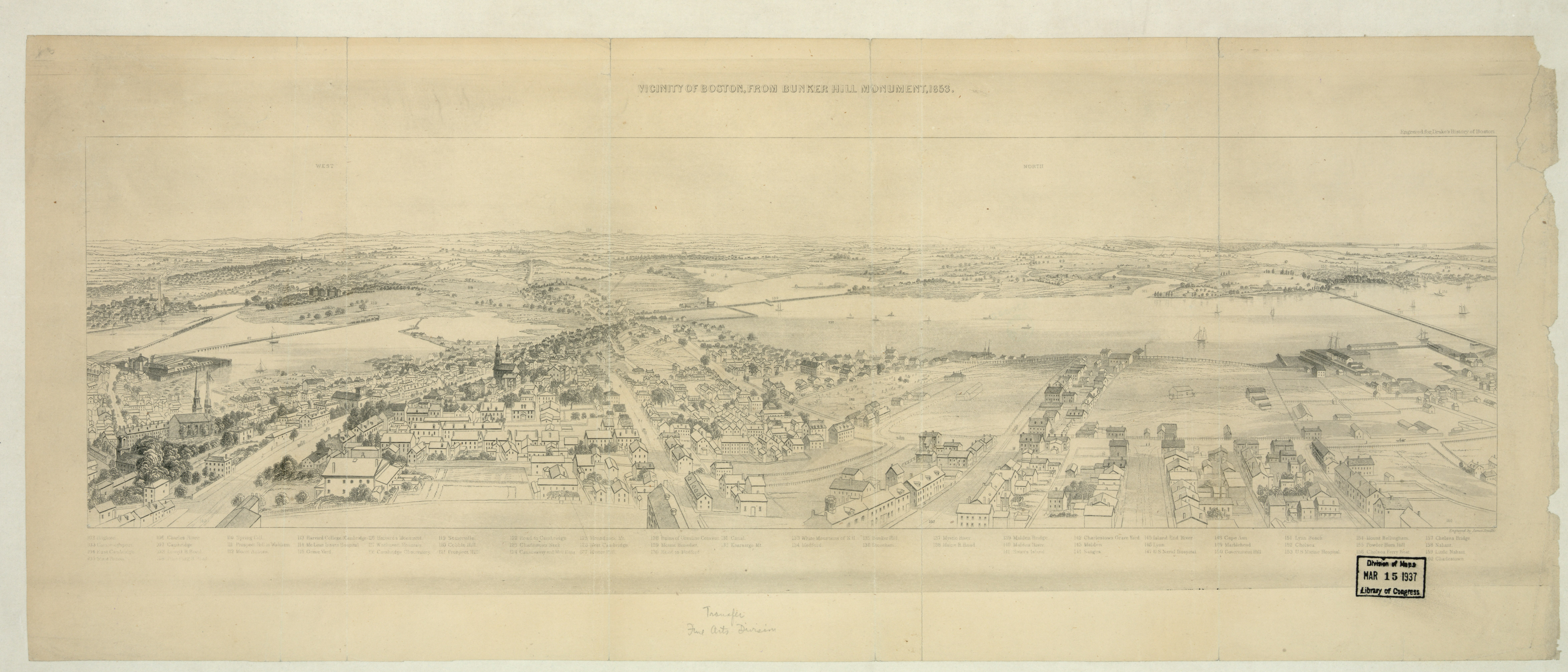
Part of a panoramic view from the Bunker Hill Monument. Artist: Richard P. Mallory. Engraver: James Smilie, 1848. Library of Congress.

Bell was active in the AMSAII. He served as vice president (1850–1851) and as president (1851–1855). He served as president of the Massachusetts Medical Society in 1857. During his tenure at McLean, three of Bell's seven children died and his wife died in childbirth. He suffered bouts of pneumonia and hemoptysis. In 1856, he retired from McLean and built a home in Charlestown, Massachusetts, in Monument Square, site of the Bunker Hill Monument. Remarkably, the location of this home, due east of the McLean Asylum, enabled Bell to look due west to view the Asylum, as pictured in a drawing by Richard Mallory. When his successor at the McLean Asylum died a year later, the Trustees asked Bell to resume his position until a new superintendent was hired. He stayed for four months.

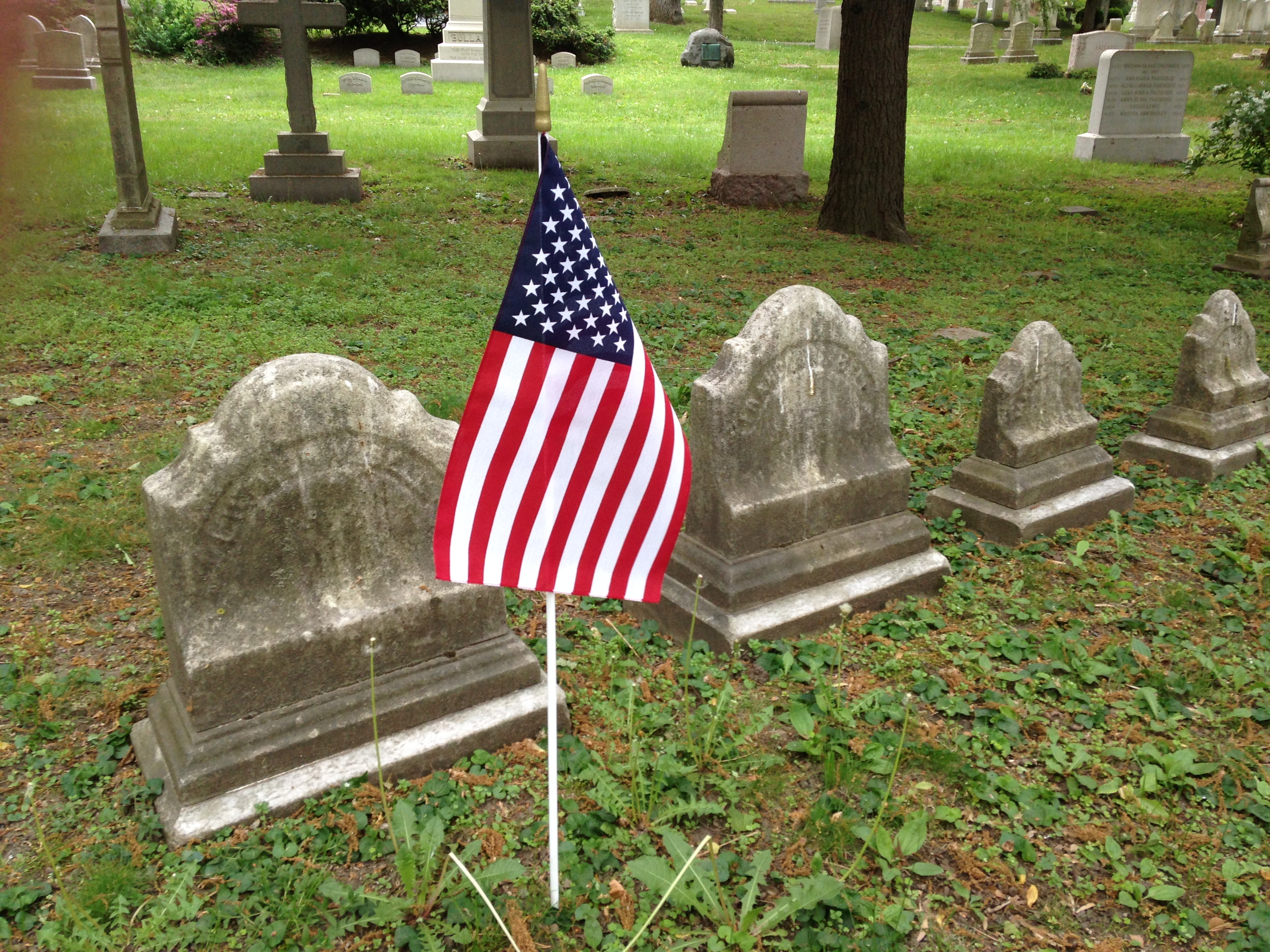
Memorial of Dr. Luther V. Bell, Mistletoe Path, Mount Auburn Cemetery, Cambridge MA. Taken on May 25, 2015 (Memorial Day). The engravings on these memorials unfortunately are fading.

With the advent of the U.S. Civil War, Bell applied for a commission as a surgeon in the U.S. Army and was assigned to the Eleventh Regiment of Massachusetts Volunteers. He took part in the Battle of Bull Run in Virginia. Bell treated many wounded soldiers in a church near the battlefield, including one John P. Mead, who subsequently succumbed to his wounds. Bell later wrote Mead's wife a moving letter now in the National Archives that can be viewed on John Banks' Civil War Blog. Bell advanced to the post of Division Surgeon in the Eleventh Regiment under General Joseph Hooker. He became ill in February 1862 and died. Dr. Bell is buried in Mount Auburn Cemetery in Cambridge, Massachusetts. His grave is located on Mistletoe Path. A photo of Bell's memorial, situated next to those of his immediate family, is marked by a flag.

Dr. Isaac Ray, one of the thirteen founders of the AMSAII, published "A Discourse on the Life and Character of Dr. Luther V. Bell," which he read at the annual meeting in 1862. The meeting adopted a Resolution expressing its sympathy of Dr. Bell's passing.

== Works ==
- Bell, Luther V. An Attempt to Investigate Some Obscure and Undecided Doctrines in Relation to Small-pox, Varioloid and Vaccination. Boston: Marsh, Capen, and Lyon, 1836. https://collections.nlm.nih.gov/catalog/nlm:nlmuid-64910280R-bk
- Bell, Luther V. A dissertation on the Boylston prize-question for 1835 : What diet can be selected which will ensure the greatest probable health and strength to the laborer in the climate of New England? --quantity and quality, and the time and manner of taking it, to be considered. Boston: D. Clapp Jr., 1836.
- Bell, Luther V. Report made to the Legislature of New Hampshire on the Subject of the Insane: June session, 1836. Concord, NH: C. Barton, printer, 1836.
- Bell, Luther V., and Dorothea L. Dix. The Practical Methods of Ventilating Buildings: Being the Annual Address before the Massachusetts Medical Society, May 31, 1848: with an Appendix on Heating by Steam and Hot Water. Boston: Damrell & Moore, 1848. https://collections.nlm.nih.gov/catalog/nlm:nlmuid-63110770R-bk
- Holmes, Oliver Wendell, and Luther V. Bell. Dissertations on the question How far are the external means of exploring the condition of the internal organs to be considered useful and important in medical practice? Boston: Printed by Perkins & Marvin, 1836.
- Ray, Isaac. A Discourse on the Life and Character of Dr. Luther V. Bell: Read to the Association of Superintendents of North American Institutions for the Insane, at its Annual Meeting, in Providence, R.I., June 10, 1862. Boston: J.H. Eastburn Press, 1863. https://archive.org/details/9609410.nlm.nih.gov

[[Category:Pinkerton Academy alumni]]

== Bibliography ==
- Andrews, Jonathan, et al. The History of Bethlem. London; New York: Routledge, 1997.
- Garraty, John A., and Mark C. Carnes, eds. American National Biography. New York: Oxford University Press, 1999.
- Hunter, Richard A., and Ida Macalpine. Three Hundred Years of Psychiatry, 1535-1860: A History Presented in Selected English Texts. London: Oxford Univ. Press, 1963.
- Parry-Jones, William LI. The Trade in Lunacy: A Study of Private Madhouses in England in the Eighteenth and Nineteenth Centuries. London: Routledge & Kegan Paul, 1972.
- Porter, Roy. Madness: A Brief History. Oxford; New York: Oxford Univ. Press, 2002.
- Scull, Andrew T. The Most Solitary of Afflictions: Madness and Society in Britain, 1700-1900. New Haven: Yale Univ. Press, 1993.
- Sutton, S. B. Crossroads in Psychiatry: A History of McLean Hospital. Washington, DC: American Psychiatric Press, 1986.

Party political offices
Preceded by Samuel H. Walley	Whig nominee for Governor of Massachusetts; 1856	Succeeded by None
