= Charles Harrison Stedman =

American physician (1805–1866)

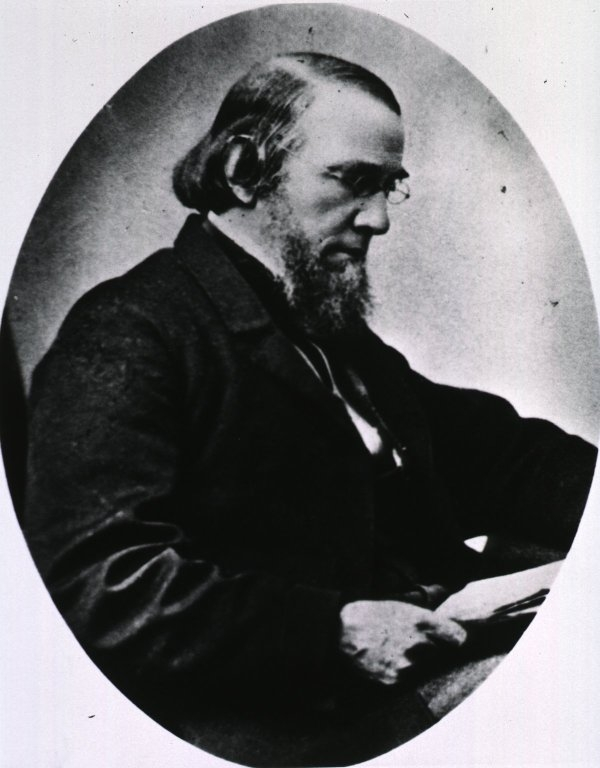
Charles Harrison Stedman

Charles Harrison Stedman (1805–1866) was one of the original founders of the first national medical society in the United States, the Association of Medical Superintendents of American Institutions for the Insane, now the American Psychiatric Association. At the time, he was superintendent of the Boston Lunatic Asylum, now the Boston State Hospital.

== Biography ==
Stedman was born in Lancaster, Massachusetts. He attended Yale University but did not graduate. Later, Yale awarded him an honorary master's degree. He attended the Harvard Medical School earning his medical degree in 1828. For the following ten years, he was a resident surgeon at the Chelsea Naval Hospital. In 1840, he began his surgical practice in Boston. His surgical experience may have led to his interest in neuroanatomy. In 1834, he revised Johann Spurzheim’s book, Anatomy of the Brain. Stedman noted in the book's Preface that he revised the American edition since he believed the London translation from the original French was hurried, contained some ambiguity, and had typographical errors.

In 1839, the Boston Lunatic Asylum was opened, the first municipal asylum in the country. Dr. John Butler was its first superintendent. Butler left in 1842 to go to the Hartford Retreat. The superintendent position at Boston was offered to and accepted by Stedman.

Stedman left the Boston Lunatic Asylum in 1851 to return to his surgical practice. He served as a visiting then senior surgeon at the Boston City Hospital when it opened in 1864. He served as the first medical coroner in Massachusetts.

He died in 1866.

== Works ==
Spurzheim, J. G., and Charles H. Stedman (rev.). The Anatomy of the Brain: with a General View of the Nervous System. Boston: Marsh, Capen & Lyon, 1834. https://collections.nlm.nih.gov/catalog/nlm:nlmuid-66311020R-bk

Spurzheim, J. G., and Charles H. Stedman (rev). The Anatomy of the Brain: with a General View of the Nervous System. Boston: Marsh, Capen & Lyon, 1836. https://collections.nlm.nih.gov/catalog/nlm:nlmuid-66311030R-bk
