= Mark Ragins =

Psychiatrist and psychosis specialist

Mark Ragins is an American psychiatrist in the recovery movement in mental health care.

== Biography ==
Ragins is a founding member of the Village ISA, where his work with people with severe mental illness made him a leading voices in recovery-based treatment theory. He is an international lecturer and a trainer for psychiatric residents through the University of Southern California's psychiatry residency.

Ragins is the author of numerous writings on recovery-based mental health care and reforming mental health systems to provide recovery-based care. In 2010, he published book, Road to Recovery. Ragins appears as a character in the book The Soloist by Steve Lopez, which was released in a movie version in 2009. In 2021, he published the book, Journeys Beyond the Frontier: A Rebellious Guide to Psychosis and Other Extraordinary Experiences.

His work advises that psychiatric drugs are overprescribed, that community engagement is a critical part of recovery from mental illness, and that psychosis results from changes in how a person experiences reality, relationships, and self-identity. He uses a humanistic and rehabilitative approach to psychiatry.

Ragins was the co-recipient of the American Psychiatric Association’s 1995 van Ameringen Award for his outstanding contribution to the field of psychiatric rehabilitation and was named a Distinguished Fellow of the American Psychiatric Association in 2006 for his continuing work in recovery-based mental health care. He received the US Psychiatric Rehabilitation Association's John Beard Lifetime achievement award in 2011.
