= Anna Yusim =

Russian-American educator (born 1977)

Anna Yusim (born February 23, 1977) is a Russian-American psychiatrist, educator, executive coach, author and academic who is known for her research and advocacy in global mental health reform and the intersection of mental health and spirituality She is an Assistant Clinical Professor at Yale School of Medicine and was named a Distinguished Fellow of the American Psychiatric Association in 2020.

== Early life and education ==
Yusim was born in Moscow, Russia, to parents Leonid and Alla Yusim. Her family emigrated to the United States in 1982 when Yusim was five years old. She grew up in Chicago, where her father worked as a biomedical engineer and her mother worked as a computer programmer.

She attended the Illinois Mathematics and Science Academy for high school, where she later received the IMSA Alumni Trailblazer Award. She then attended Stanford University, where she graduated with a Bachelor of Science Degree in Biological Sciences and double Honors in Biology and Philosophy / Ethics. She was awarded the Hoefer Prize at Stanford University for the essay written in the Social Sciences entitled, "Cigarettes, Poverty, and the Inadequacy of Desert: A Philosophical Quest for Justice in Health Care". Her Philosophy / Ethics thesis was awarded The Golden Award for top thesis written in the Humanities and Creative Arts.

She completed her Medical Degree at Yale School of Medicine, where she received the Janet M. Glasgow-Rubin Award for women physicians with high academic achievement, the Max Kade Fellowship and the William F. Downs Fellowship for International Research. She then went on to complete her psychiatry residency at NYU Langone Health, where she received the Outstanding Research Resident Award from the National Institute of Mental Health, APIRE/Janssen Research Award, the American Psychoanalytic Association Fellowship, the Columbia Psychoanalytic Fellowship. During her residency training, she conducted research in Rwanda and wrote for the American Journal of Psychiatry.

== Career ==
Currently she is a faculty member at Yale School of Medicine, where she co-founded the Yale Program on Spirituality, Mental Health & the Brain, an initiative that bridges the Yale Medical School and the Yale Divinity School through research, education and clinical care.

She is the Chief Medical Officer of Conscious Health, a holistic mental health clinic that integrates contemporary psychiatric treatments such as ketamine therapy, transcranial magnetic stimulation (TMS), and electromagnetic brain pulsing (EMBP). She has also evaluated a psychospiritual-existential framework known as the Discovery Model,” which is currently under study at Yale University.

Yusim also serves as the Medical Lead for SuperMind, a Miami-based mental health start-up. She sits on the boards of several mental health organizations, including Being Health, Pause + Purpose, the Lifeboat Foundation, and the Mental Health TV Network.

In addition to her clinical and research activities, Yusim works as an executive coach with the Marshall Goldsmith 100 Coaches Agency. Her commentary and writing on mental health have appeared in outlets such as Forbes and Newsweek.

== Selected publications ==
=== Journal articles ===
- Yusim, Anna; Grigaitis, Justinas (February 2020). "Efficacy of Binaural Beat Meditation Technology for Treating Anxiety Symptoms: A Pilot Study". The Journal of Nervous and Mental Disease. 208 (2): 155–160. doi:10.1097/NMD.0000000000001070. ISSN 1539-736X. PMID 31977827.
- Yusim, Anna; Anbarasan, Deepti; Hall, Brian; Goetz, Ray; Neugebauer, Richard; Stewart, Thomas; Abou, Janet; Castaneda, Ricardo; Ruiz, Pedro (2010). "Sociocultural domains of depression among indigenous populations in Latin America". International Review of Psychiatry. 22 (4): 370–377. doi:10.3109/09540261.2010.500870. ISSN 1369-1627. PMID 20874067.
- Lindenmayer, Jean Pierre; Tedeschi, Frank; Yusim, Anna; Khan, Anzalee; Kaushik, Saurabh; Smith, Robert C.; Parakadavil, Mohan (2012). "Ziprasidone's effect on metabolic markers in patients with diabetes and chronic schizophrenia". Clinical Schizophrenia & Related Psychoses. 5 (4): 185–192. doi:10.3371/CSRP.5.4.2. ISSN 1935-1232. PMID 22182455.
- Belkin, Gary S.; Yusim, Anna; Anbarasan, Deepti; Bernstein, Carol Ann (2011-11-01). "Teaching "Global Mental Health:" Psychiatry Residency Directors' Attitudes and Practices Regarding International Opportunities for Psychiatry Residents". Academic Psychiatry. 35 (6): 400–403. doi:10.1176/appi.ap.35.6.400. ISSN 1042-9670. PMID 22193740.
- Yusim, Anna; Anbarasan, Deepti; Bernstein, Carol; Boksay, Istvan; Dulchin, Michael; Lindenmayer, Jean-Pierre; Saavedra-Velez, Carlos; Shapiro, Maksim; Sadock, Benjamin (2008). "Normal Pressure Hydrocephalus Presenting as Othello Syndrome: Case Presentation and Review of the Literature". American Journal of Psychiatry. 165 (9): 1119–1125. doi:10.1176/appi.ajp.2008.07111820. ISSN 0002-953X. PMID 18765494.
- Yusim, Anna; Franklin, L.; Brooke, S.; Ajilore, O.; Sapolsky, Robert M. (March 2000). "Glucocorticoids exacerbate the deleterious effects of gp120 in hippocampal and cortical explants". Journal of Neurochemistry. 74 (3): 1000–1007. doi:10.1046/j.1471-4159.2000.0741000.x. ISSN 0022-3042. PMID 10693930.
- Yusim, Anna; Ajilore, O.; Bliss, T.; Sapolsky, Robert M. (2000-07-07). "Glucocorticoids exacerbate insult-induced declines in metabolism in selectively vulnerable hippocampal cell fields". Brain Research. 870 (1–2): 109–117. doi:10.1016/S0006-8993(00)02407-0. ISSN 0006-8993. PMID 10869507.

=== Books ===
- Yusim, Anna (June 27, 2017). Fulfilled: How the Science of Spirituality Can Help You Live a Happier, More Meaningful Life. Grand Central Life & Style. ISBN 978-1455596799.
