= Eitan Schwarz =

American psychiatrist

Eitan Daniel Schwarz M.D.
- Education: Johns Hopkins University
- Known for: adult, forensic, and child psychiatry
- Scientific career
- Fields: Psychiatry
- Workplaces: Northwestern University
- Website: http://www.mydigitalfamily.org

Dr. Eitan Schwarz is an adult, child, and adolescent psychiatrist. He is a graduate of Johns Hopkins University and has a psychiatric practice in Skokie, Illinois. He published the book Kids, Parents, and Technology in 2010. He's currently on the faculty at Northwestern University's psychiatric department, and his research interests include PTSD, digital media in play therapy and the consumption of media by children and families.

== Education ==
Schwarz attended undergraduate school at Cornell University in Ithaca, NY, and received his M.D. from Johns Hopkins University in Baltimore, Maryland in 1969. He interned for one year at Boston City Hospital in Boston, Massachusetts, then completed a psychiatric residency at the University of Chicago in 1973. In 1975, he completed a fellowship at Michael Reese Hospital and Medical Center in Chicago, Illinois.

He is currently on the faculty of Northwestern University's Feinberg School of Medicine, where he serves as clinical assistant of psychiatry.

== Private practice ==
Schwarz runs a private practice at 4905 Old Orchard Center, #339, in Skokie, IL, 60077, where he practices child and adolescent psychiatry. As part of his private practice Schwarz runs the online resource MyDigitalFamily, which works with neuroscience, internet technology, and media to enhance child development and family life.

== Kids, Parents, and Technology (2010) ==
In March 2010 Schwarz published the paperback self-help book Kids, Parents, and Technology: A Guide for Young Families. The book is meant to help caregivers shape how their children consume and use digital technology. He released the book on paperback and as an E-book.

Book overview

In the book Schwarz claims that younger children are increasingly in charge of how they use media, but that they mainly consume "junk." He also says that excessive consumption can cause and exacerbate emotional difficulties. He argues that parents should manage children's media consumption just like they do nutrition; not with complete restriction, but educated consumption. Digital media, he claims, does not have to be a threat to watchful parents, but that parents should still avoid "texting while parenting", as it could negatively affect children who can benefit from focused adult interaction and face-to-face contact.

== Academic specialties ==
His specialty is Adolescent and Pediatric Psychiatry. He's considered an expert on PTSD, behavior and technology, children, and families. While at Northwestern University, Schwarz has recently researched the use of digital media in play therapy with children.

== Certifications ==
In 1975, he was Board Certified in general, child, and adolescent psychiatry by the American Board of Psychiatry and Neurology In 1990, he was elected to Fellow membership at the American Academy of Child and Adolescent Psychiatry (FAACAP). In 2005, he became a Distinguished Life Fellow of the American Psychiatric Association (DLFAPA).

== Awards ==
Since 1990 he was listed by Marquis Who's Who in Who's Who in the World, Who's Who in America, Who's Who in the Midwest, and Who's Who in Medicine and Healthcare. He also received a "21st Century Award for Achievement" by the International Biographical Centre in Cambridge, England. Since 2002 he was included in Castle Connelly Medical's publication of Top Doctors in the Chicago Metro Area.
