= Samuel Bayard Woodward =

American psychiatrist

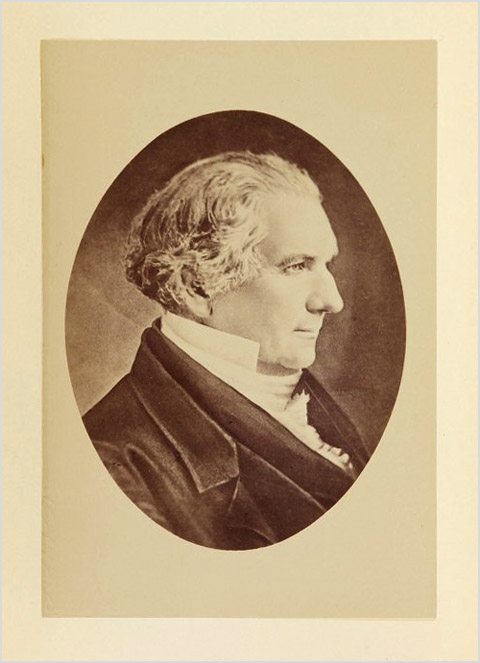
- Born: June 10, 1787; Torringford
- Died: January 3, 1850 (aged 62); Northampton
- Occupation: Psychiatrist
- Children: Rufus Woodward
- Awards: honorary degree (Doctor of Medicine, Yale School of Medicine, 1822)
- Position held: President of the American Psychiatric Association (1844–1848)

Samuel Bayard Woodward (1787–1850) was an American psychiatrist who was the first superintendent of the Worcester Lunatic Asylum, and a co-founder and first president of the Association of Medical Superintendents of American Institutions for the Insane (later known as the American Psychiatric Association).

Woodward also served a one year term in the Connecticut State Senate from 1832 to 1833, representing the 1st District which consisted of Hartford and the surrounding area.
