= Care New England =

Non-profit health system in Rhode Island, US

Care New England Health System
- Founded: 1996
- Purpose: Healthcare
- Location: Providence, Rhode Island, US
- Employees: 8,000
- Website: www.carene.org

Care New England (CNE) is a non-profit health system, comprising several hospitals in Rhode Island. Founding members Butler Hospital, Kent Hospital, and Women & Infants Hospital of Rhode Island formed CNE in February 1996. Based in Providence, Care New England serves the southeastern New England community, and many of its hospitals are teaching affiliates of The Warren Alpert Medical School of Brown University. It is Rhode Island's second largest hospital group.

Current members of Care New England include:

- Butler Hospital
- Kent Hospital
- Women & Infants
- VNA of Care New England
- Care New England Wellness Center
- The Providence Center

Former members of Care New England include:

- Memorial Hospital

In June 1999, Kent County Visiting Nurse Association became a member of the Care New England family, and later that year announced its name change to VNA of Care New England. In 2000, HealthTouch, Inc., a private duty nursing service, joined the division. In 2013, Memorial Hospital, a community hospital in Pawtucket, RI joined as well.

Care New England faced operating losses of over 14 million dollars in 2023; this is a significant improvement from the year prior when it had losses over 58 million dollars. Total operative revenue in 2023 was close to 1.3 billion dollars.
