= Eastern State Hospital (Virginia) =

Hospital in Williamsburg, Virginia, US

Coordinates: 37°17′17.8″N 76°44′5.3″W

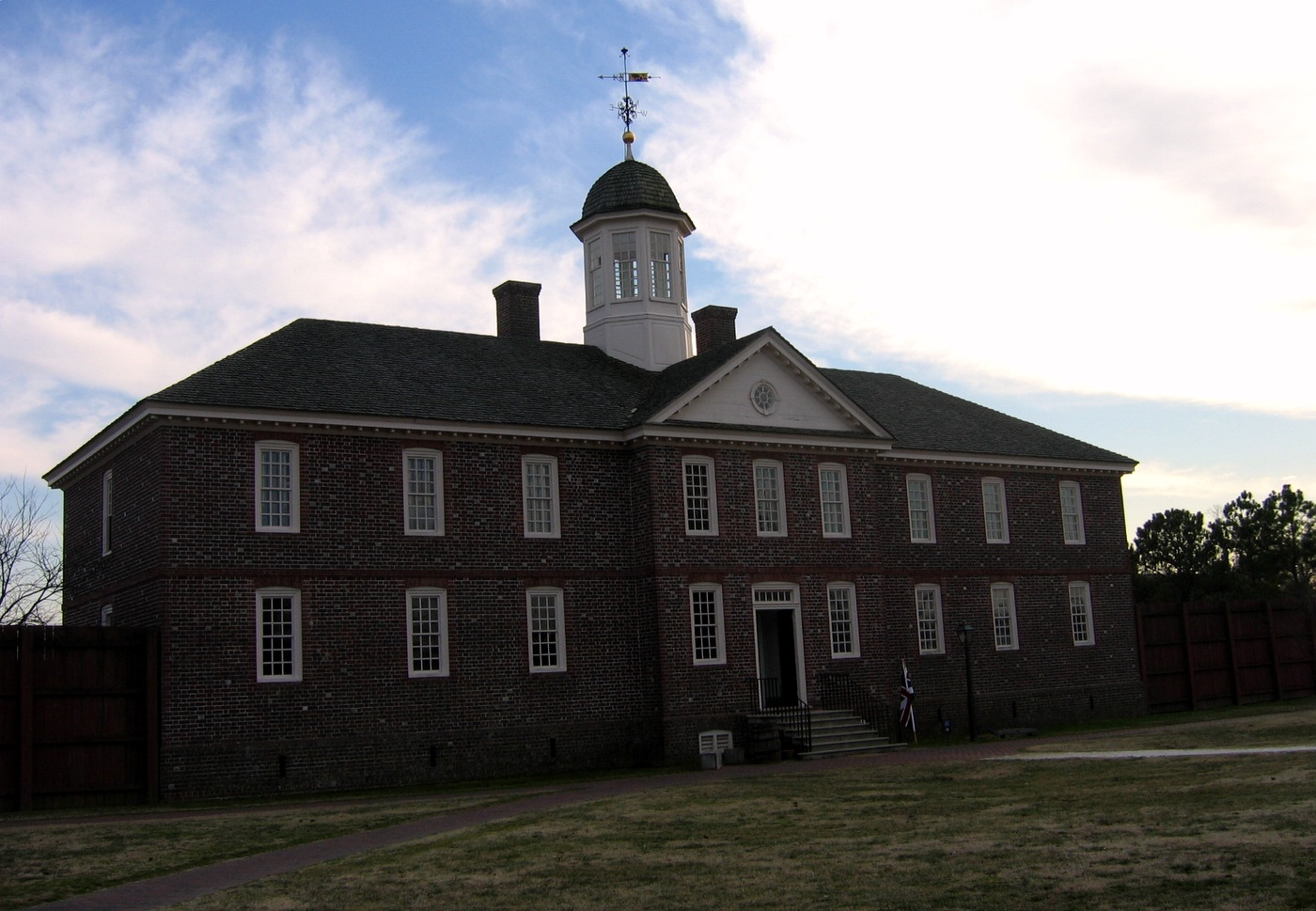
The reconstructed 1773 hospital as it stands today in Williamsburg, Virginia

Eastern State Hospital is a psychiatric hospital in Williamsburg, Virginia. Built in 1773, it was the first public facility in the present-day United States constructed solely for the care and treatment of the mentally ill. The original building had burned but was reconstructed in 1985.

== Francis Fauquier and the Enlightenment ==
Eastern State Hospital traces its foundation to a speech by Francis Fauquier, Royal Governor of the colony of Virginia, on November 6, 1766. At the House of Burgesses' first meeting since the Stamp Act and Virginia Resolves, Fauquier primarily discussed the relationship between the Mother Country and these colonists, and expressed optimism for their future. His speech also unexpectedly addressed the mentally ill, as follows:

"It is expedient I should also recommend to your Consideration and Humanity a poor unhappy set of People who are deprived of their senses and wander about the Country, terrifying the Rest of their fellow creatures. A legal Confinement, and proper Provision, ought to be appointed for these miserable Objects, who cannot help themselves. Every civilized Country has a Hospital for these People, where they are confined, maintained and attended by able Physicians, to endeavor to restore to them their lost reason."

About a year later, on April 11, 1767, Governor Fauquier addressed the same issue before the next House of Burgesses, thus:

"There is a subject which gives me concern, on which I shall particularly address myself to you, as it is your peculiar province to provide means for the subsistence of the poor of any kind. The subject I mean is the case of the poor lunatics. I find on your journals that it was Resolved, That a hospital be erected for the reception of persons who are so unhappy as to be deprived of their reason; And that it was Ordered, that the Committee of Propositions and Grievances do prepare and bring in a bill pursuant to the above resolution. But I do not find that any thing more was done in it. It was a measure which I think could offend no party, and which I was in hopes humanity would have dictated to every man, as soon as he was made acquainted with the call for it. It also concerns me much on another account; for as the case now stands, I am as it were compelled to the daily commission of an illegal act, by confining without my authority, a poor lunatic, who, if set at liberty, would be mischievous to society; and I would choose to be bound by, and observant of, the laws of the country. As I think this is a point of some importance to the ease and comfort of the whole community, as well as a point of charity to the unhappy objects, I shall again recommend it to you at your next meeting; when I hope, after mature reflection, it will be found to be more worth your attention than it has been in this."

Governor Fauquier's benevolent and bold expressions did eventually lead to the establishment of the Eastern State Hospital, although he died March 3, 1768, before it was built. His compassion and humanitarian care for those who needed it the most, made it easier for his ideas to be developed and a facility built.

Fauquier's concern probably rested in Enlightenment principles, which were so widespread throughout the time. The 18th century was a time for rejecting superstitions and religions, and substituting science and logical reasoning. The philosophers David Hume and Voltaire were studying and investigating the worth of human life, which would ultimately alter perceptions of the mentally ill. During this time in London, insane people were viewed and used for as entertainment and comical relief. The Bethlehem Royal Hospital (sometimes called Bedlam) attracted many tourists and even held frequent parades of inmates. Enlightenment attitudes encouraged more sensitivity towards the mentally ill, rather than treating them as outcasts and fools. Some started to believe that being mentally ill was, in fact, an illness of the mind, much like a physical disease or sickness, and that these mental illnesses were also treatable.

Before Governor Fauquier's speeches, a person who was mentally ill was not diagnosed by a doctor, but rather judged by 12 citizens, much like a jury, to be either a criminal, lunatic or Idiot. Most classified as lunatic were placed in the Public Gaol in Williamsburg. Taxpayers probably appreciated the hospital idea only if they had a family member or close friend who was mentally ill. The only hospital where mentally ill patients were sometimes taken before Eastern State Hospital was built, was the Pennsylvania Hospital, a Quaker institution in Philadelphia. Until a campaign by Benjamin Rush in 1792 to establish a separate treatment wing, mentally ill patients were kept in the basement and out of the way of regular patients who needed medical assistance.

Percival Goodhouse was thought to be one of the first patients admitted to the Eastern State Hospital after its opening on October 12, 1773.

== Civil War and decline ==
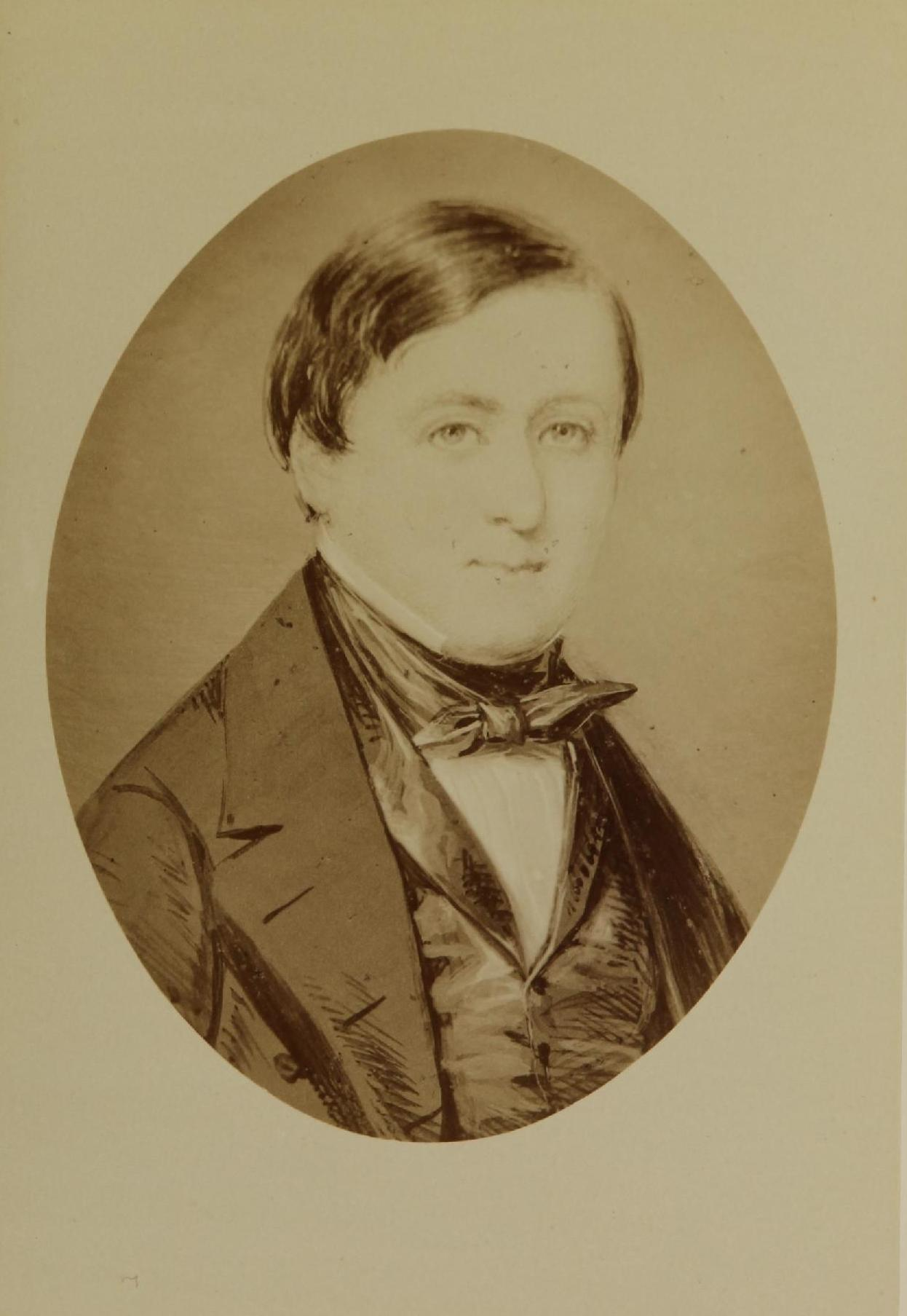
Dr. John M. Galt

In 1841, Dr. John Galt was appointed superintendent of the hospital, with roughly 125 patients (then called "inmates") at the time. Dr. Galt introduced Moral treatment practices, a school of thought which viewed those with mental illness as deserving of respect and dignity rather than punishment for their behavior. Galt provided his patients with talk therapy and occupational therapy, and argued for in-house research. He decreased the use of physical restraints, even going an entire year without using them, relying instead on calming drugs (including laudanum), and also proposed deinstitutionalizing patients in favor of community-based care, though this proposal was repeatedly rejected. As the head of the hospital, Galt was successful in pressing for admission for enslaved people with mental illness, and taught the enslaved people owned by the hospital to provide talk therapy alongside nurses and aides. Although he claimed to treat patients equally regardless of their race, Galt did not publish racial breakdowns of his patients.

When the Civil War came to Williamsburg, the hospital found itself alternately on one side of the lines and then the other. On May 6, 1862, Union troops captured the asylum. Two weeks later, on May 17 or 18, Dr. Galt died of an overdose of laudanum, though it is unclear whether this was intentional or accidental. When the hospital was captured, Union soldiers found that the 252 patients had been locked in without food or supplies by the fleeing white employees. Somersett Moore was the only non-African American employee to return following the capture, and he gave the keys to release the patients to the occupying men.

In the following decades, the increasingly crowded hospital saw a regression in methodology as science was increasingly viewed as an ineffective means of dealing with mental illness. During this era of custodial care, the goal became not to cure patients, but to provide a comfortable environment for them, separate from society. On June 7, 1885, the original 1773 hospital burned to the ground due to a fire that had started in the building's newly added electrical wiring, a consequence of the great expansion of facilities at this time.

== Restoration ==
By 1935 Eastern State Hospital housed some 2,000 patients with no more land for expansion. The restoration of Colonial Williamsburg and development of the Williamsburg Inn resulted in the facility being at the center of a thriving tourist trade. The hospital's location and space issues made a move necessary. Between 1937 and 1968, all of Eastern State's patients were moved to a new facility on the outskirts of Williamsburg, Virginia, where it continues to operate today.

In 1985, the original hospital was reconstructed on its excavated foundations by the Colonial Williamsburg Foundation.
