= Women & Infants Hospital of Rhode Island =

Hospital in Providence, Rhode Island, US

- Care New England

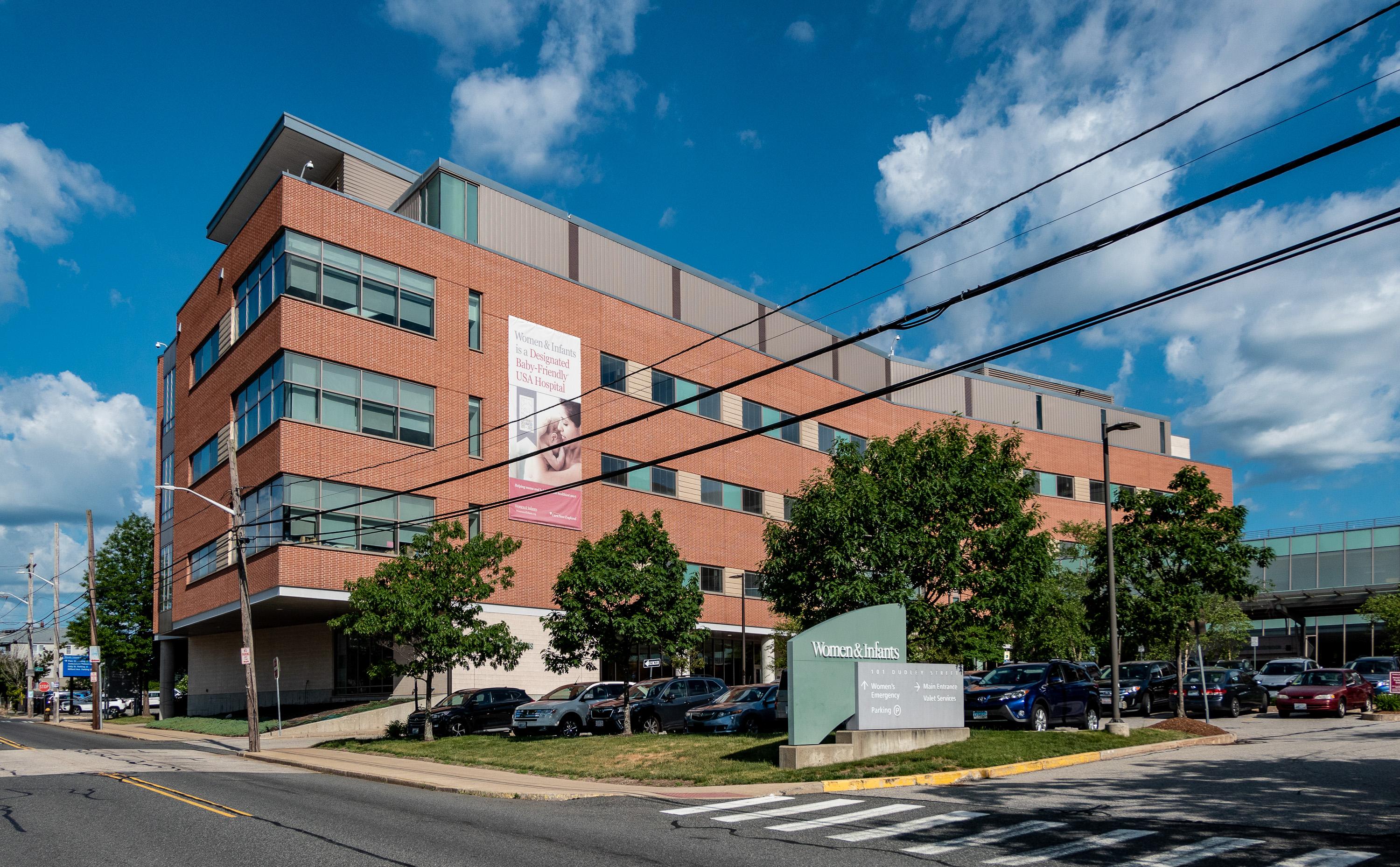

Geography
- Location: Providence, Rhode Island, United States
- Coordinates: 41°48′39″N 71°24′44″W

Organization
- Care system: Private
- Affiliated university: Warren Alpert Medical School

Services
- Beds: 137

History
- Founded: 1884

Links
- Website: www.womenandinfants.org
- Lists: Hospitals in Rhode Island

Women & Infants Hospital of Rhode Island is a women's and infants' hospital in Providence, Rhode Island. It is the primary teaching hospital in obstetrics, gynecology, and newborn pediatrics of the Warren Alpert Medical School at Brown University. In 1996, Women & Infants Hospital was a founding member (along with Butler Hospital and Kent Hospital) of the Care New England Health System.

== History ==
Women & Infants Hospital was founded in 1884 as the Providence Lying-In Hospital, which was exclusively a maternity hospital where women could safely deliver babies.

The hospital was initially located at the General James Estate on Slocum Street in Providence, Rhode Island, but it was moved two years later to the corner of State and Field streets after it outgrew its initial building. It was moved again in 1926 to 50 Maude Street, where it remained for 60 years. Women & Infants continued to expand and modernize over the years, and it became affiliated with Rhode Island Hospital in the late 1970s. The hospital was moved once again in 1986 to its current location on Dudley Street in the Upper South Providence neighborhood in order to further facilitate future physical expansion and program developments.

In 1996, Women & Infants Hospital joined with Butler Hospital and Kent Hospital to create the Care New England Health System.

In September 2009, the hospital opened the South Pavilion, a five-story NICU addition. It included 70 single-family private rooms, 10 multi-bed rooms, and 30 ante-partum rooms. The building received LEED Gold certification in February 2010 for implementing environmentally friendly features.

In March 2025, Women & Infants Hospital opened the Brown University Labor and Delivery Center, a three-story building that included private birthing suites and 20 labor and delivery rooms. It also provided dedicated spaces for health care professionals, including nurses' stations, staff lounges, and management offices.

== Current operations ==
About 8,400 babies are delivered per year. The Special Care Nursery treats about 1,200 newborns annually. More than 7,500 procedures are performed in the gynecological and general surgical program each year.

The hospital offers services including infertility treatment, breast care, gynecologic cancer, urinary incontinence, prenatal diagnosis, low- and high-risk obstetrics, gynecology care, women's gastrointestinal health, behavioral health, and primary care. The hospital also provides educational, medical, nutritional, and support services through its Obstetrics and Gynecology Care Center. It maintains outreach sites in East Greenwich, Woonsocket, and South Kingstown.

Women & Infants Hospital is affiliated with the Warren Alpert Medical School of Brown University as a teaching hospital for obstetrics, gynecology, and neonatology. The hospital conducts research in areas including urogynecology, oncology, and maternal-fetal medicine. The hospital maintains relationships with various nursing schools and professional institutions.

Erin Yale is the President and Chief Operating Officer of the hospital.

== Awards, recognition and grants ==
- Named one of the top 50 hospitals in gynecology in the America's Best Hospitals edition of U.S. News & World Report in 2000, 2001 and 2004.
- Women & Infants and Brown University were named a National Center of Excellence in Women's Health by the U.S. Department of Health and Human Services in 2003.
- $9 million Center of Biomedical Research Excellence (COBRE) National Institute of Health grant in perinatal biology.
- $2 million grant from the National Institute of Child Health and Human Development for the study of fetal death.

== See also ==
- List of hospitals in Rhode Island
