= Kent Hospital =

Coordinates: 41°42′19.4″N 71°28′40.7″W

- Care New England

Geography
- Location: Warwick, Rhode Island, United States

Organization
- Care system: Private

Services
- Beds: 346

Helipads
- Helipad: Aeronautical chart and airport information for RI01 at SkyVector

History
- Former name: Kent County Memorial Hospital
- Founded: 1951

Links
- Website: kentri.org
- Lists: Hospitals in Rhode Island

Kent Hospital is a community teaching hospital located in Warwick, Rhode Island. It was a founding member of the Care New England in 1996, along with Women & Infants Hospital and Butler Hospital.

== History ==
Kent Hospital was chartered by the State of Rhode Island in 1946, and was opened in 1951 with 90 beds. It was expanded in 1960, 1973, and 1981 in response to rapid community growth. In 1996, Kent Hospital joined with Butler Hospital and Women & Infants Hospital to create the Care New England Health System.

== Current operations ==
Kent Hospital is the second-largest single site hospital in the state, and is located just 11 miles south of Providence, RI. More than 2,300 employees, a medical staff of 600, a volunteer corp of 250 and 350 auxiliary members work in the hospital, which currently has 359 beds. The staff handles over 18,000 surgical procedures, 140,000 radiology procedures, and more than 1 million laboratory tests per year. The Emergency Services Department, the second busiest in the state, handles approximately 75,000 visits annually.

The hospital offers specialty services such as a multidisciplinary Wound Recovery Center and a cancer program accredited by the American College of Surgeons.

Kent Hospital employs innovative approaches to the recruitment and retention of nurses. Its unique collaboration program with Salve Regina University brings baccalaureate classes on-site for Kent nurses.

Alpert Medical School of Brown University is the primary teaching affiliate. Kent is also a teaching affiliate of the University of New England College of Osteopathic Medicine (located in Biddeford, Maine) and offers residency programs in emergency medicine, internal medicine and family practice. Additionally, they offer fellowships in gastroenterology and hyperbaric medicine.

Carolyn Jackson is president and Chief Executive Officer.

== See also ==
- List of hospitals in Rhode Island
