= American Psychiatric Association =

Professional organization of US psychiatrists

Coordinates: 38.879713°N 77.025061°W

- Abbreviation: APA
- Formation: October 16, 1844; 182 years ago
- Founders: William Maclay Awl; Luther V. Bell, Amariah Brigham; John S. Butler; Nehemiah Cutter; Pliny Earle; John M. Galt; Thomas Story Kirkbride; Isaac Ray; Charles Harrison Stedman; Francis T. Stribling; Samuel White; Samuel B. Woodward
- Founded at: Philadelphia, Pennsylvania, U.S.
- Type: Professional association
- Tax ID no.: 52-2168499
- Legal status: 501(c)(6) organization
- Headquarters: Washington, D.C., U.S.
- Members: 39,200
- President: Theresa Miskimen
- President-elect: Mark Rapaport
- Chief executive officer: Marketa M. Wills
- Subsidiaries: American Psychiatric Association Foundation; American Psychiatric Political Action Committee; American Psychiatric Association Insurance Trust; APA Wharf Holdings LLC
- Revenue: $64,631,488 (2023)
- Expenses: $62,115,499 (2023)
- Employees: 248 (2023)
- Volunteers: 650 (2023)
- Website: www.psychiatry.org
- Formerly called: Association of Medical Superintendents of American Institutions for the Insane (1844–1891); American Medico-Psychological Association (1892–1919)

The American Psychiatric Association (APA) is the main professional organization of psychiatrists and trainee psychiatrists in the United States, and the largest psychiatric organization in the world. It has more than 39,200 members who are involved in psychiatric practice, research, and academia representing a diverse population of patients in more than 100 countries.

The association publishes various journals and pamphlets, as well as the Diagnostic and Statistical Manual of Mental Disorders (DSM). The DSM codifies psychiatric conditions and is used mostly in the United States as a guide for diagnosing mental disorders.

The organization has its headquarters in Washington, D.C.

== History ==
At a meeting in 1844 in Philadelphia, thirteen superintendents and organizers of insane asylums and hospitals formed the Association of Medical Superintendents of American Institutions for the Insane (AMSAII). The group included Thomas Kirkbride, creator of the asylum model which was used throughout the United States. The group was chartered to focus "primarily on the administration of hospitals and how that affected the care of patients", as opposed to conducting research or promoting the profession.

In 1893, the organization changed its name to the American Medico-Psychological Association. In 1921, the association changed that name to the present American Psychiatric Association. The association was incorporated in 1927.

The cover of the publication Semi-Centennial Proceedings of the American Medical Psychological Association, which the association distributed in 1894 at its 50th annual meeting in Philadelphia, contained the first depiction of the association's official seal. The seal has undergone several changes since that time.

The present seal is a round medallion with a purported likeness of Benjamin Rush's profile and 13 stars over his head to represent the 13 founders of the organization. The outer ring contains the words "American Psychiatric Association 1844." Rush's name and an MD are below the picture.

An association history of the seal states:

The choice of Rush (1746–1813) for the seal reflects his place in history. .... Rush's practice of psychiatry was based on bleeding, purging, and the use of the tranquilizer chair and gyrator. By 1844 these practices were considered erroneous and abandoned. Rush, however, was the first American to study mental disorder in a systematic manner, and he is considered the father of American Psychiatry.

In 2015, the association adopted a new logo that depicts the serpent-entwined Rod of Asclepius superimposed over the image of two hemispheres of a human brain. The logo appears next to the words "American Psychiatric Association", with the word "Psychiatric" in bold type; the tagline "Medical leadership for mind, brain and body" appears below the logo. The association will continue to use the seal bearing Rush's profile for ceremonial purposes and for some internal documents.

== Organization and membership ==
APA is led by the President of the American Psychiatric Association and a board of trustees with an executive committee.

APA reports that its membership is primarily medical specialists who are qualified, or in the process of becoming qualified, as psychiatrists. The basic eligibility requirement is completion of a residency program in psychiatry accredited by the Residency Review Committee for Psychiatry of the Accreditation Council for Graduate Medical Education (ACGME), the Royal College of Physicians and Surgeons of Canada (RCPS[C]), or the American Osteopathic Association (AOA). Applicants for membership must also hold a valid medical license (with the exception of medical students and residents) and provide one reference who is an APA member.

APA holds an annual conference attended by an American and international audience.

APA is made up of some 76 district associations throughout the country.

=== Foundation ===
APA operates a non-profit subsidiary called the American Psychiatric Association Foundation (APAF), offering community-based programs and research initiatives intended to better understand and support issues of mental health. Its strategic partners include the Council of State Governments (CSG) Justice Center, Substance Abuse and Mental Health Services Administration (SAMHSA) and the National Association of Counties (NACo).

==== Corporate Alliance ====
APAF partners with industry organizations to collaborate on mental health research and development through its Corporate Alliance. Current and recent members of the alliance include:

- AbbVie
- Acadia Pharmaceuticals
- Alkermes
- Allergan
- Bausch Health
- Boehringer Ingelheim
- Eisai
- Indivior
- Janssen Pharmaceuticals
- Jazz Pharmaceuticals
- Lundbeck
- Myriad Genetics
- Neurocrine Biosciences
- Otsuka Pharmaceutical
- Pfizer
- Sunovion
- Takeda Pharmaceutical Company

Donors to the foundation in 2019 include the Austen Riggs Center, BB&T, Cenveo, McLean Hospital, Menninger Foundation, NeuroStar, Newport Academy, NewYork-Presbyterian Hospital, Sheppard Pratt, and Silver Hill Hospital.

== Publications and campaigns ==
APA position statements, clinical practice guidelines, and descriptions of its core diagnostic manual (the DSM) are published.

APA publishes several journals focused on different areas of psychiatry, for example, academic, clinical practice, or news.

=== Top five Choosing Wisely recommendations ===
In coordination with the American Board of Internal Medicine, the APA proposes five recommendations for physicians and patients. The list was compiled by members of the Council on Research and Quality Care. The APA places a primary focus on antipsychotic medications due to a rapid increase in sales, from $9.6 billion in 2004 to $18.5 billion in 2011.

1. Do not prescribe antipsychotic medications to patients for any indication without appropriate initial evaluation and appropriate ongoing monitoring.
2. Do not routinely prescribe two or more antipsychotic medications concurrently.
3. Do not prescribe antipsychotic medications as a first-line intervention to treat behavioral and psychological symptoms of dementia.
4. Do not routinely prescribe antipsychotic medications as a first-line intervention for insomnia in adults.
5. Do not routinely prescribe antipsychotic medications as a first-line intervention for children or adolescents for any diagnosis other than psychotic disorders.

== Notable figures ==
- Donald Cameron, was president of the American Psychiatric Association in 1952–53. He conducted coercive experiments widely denounced as unethical, including involuntary electroshock therapy, drug administration, and prolonged confinement and sensory deprivation funded as part of the Central Intelligence Agency Project MKUltra.
- Enoch Callaway, psychiatrist, pioneer in biological psychiatry.
- Mark S. Komrad, served on the APA Ethics Committee and member of the APA Assembly for eight years.
- Adolf Meyer, former psychiatrist-in-chief at the Johns Hopkins Hospital, was the president of the American Psychiatric Association from 1927 to 1928 and was one of the most influential figures in psychiatry in the first half of the twentieth century.
- Mark Ragins: American psychiatrist in the recovery movement, founding member of the Village ISA. He won the 1995 van Ameringen Award for his outstanding contribution to the field of psychiatric rehabilitation and was named a Distinguished Fellow of the American Psychiatric Association in 2006.
- Herb Pardes past president and noted figure in American psychiatry.
- Eitan Schwarz, Distinguished Life Fellow
- Robert Spitzer was the chair of the task force of the third edition of the DSM.
- Anna Yusim, Distinguished Fellow in 2020.

== Drug company ties ==
In his book Anatomy of an Epidemic (2010), Robert Whitaker described the partnership that has developed between the APA and pharmaceutical companies since the 1980s. APA has come to depend on pharmaceutical money. The drug companies endowed continuing education and psychiatric "grand rounds" at hospitals. They funded a political action committee in 1982 to lobby Congress. The industry helped to pay for the APA's media training workshops. It was able to turn psychiatrists at top schools into speakers, and although the doctors felt they were independents, they rehearsed their speeches and likely would not be invited back if they discussed drug side effects. "Thought leaders" became the experts quoted in the media. As Marcia Angell wrote in The New England Journal of Medicine (2000), "thought leaders" could agree to be listed as an author of ghostwritten articles, and she cites Thomas Bodenheimer and David Rothman who describe the extent of the drug industry's involvement with doctors. The New York Times published a summary about antipsychotic medications in October 2010.

In 2008, for the first time, Senator Charles Grassley asked the APA to disclose how much of its annual budget came from drug industry funds. The APA said that industry contributed 28 percent of its budget ($14 million at that time), mainly through paid advertising in APA journals and funds for continuing medical education.

The APA receives additional funding from the pharmaceutical industry through its American Psychiatric Association Foundation (APAF), including Boehringer Ingelheim, Janssen Pharmaceuticals, and Takeda Pharmaceutical Company, among others.

== Controversies ==
In the 1964 election, Fact magazine polled American Psychiatric Association members on whether Barry Goldwater was fit to be president and published "The Unconscious of a Conservative: A Special Issue on the Mind of Barry Goldwater". This led to a ban on the diagnosis of a public figure by psychiatrists who have not performed an examination or been authorized to release information by the patient. This became the Goldwater rule.

Supported by various funding sources, the APA and its members have played major roles in examining points of contention in the field and addressing uncertainties about psychiatric illness and its treatment, as well as the relationship of individual mental health concerns to those of the community. Controversies have related to anti-psychiatry and disability rights campaigners, who regularly protest at American Psychiatric Association offices or meetings. In 1970, members of the Gay Liberation Front organization protested the APA conference in San Francisco. At the 1972 conference John E. Fryer M.D. delivered - under the pseudonym Dr. Henry Anonymous - an impactful speech, catalyzing the APA in 1973 to remove homosexuality as a classified mental illness from the DSM In 2003 activists from MindFreedom International staged a 21-day hunger strike, protesting at a perceived unjustified biomedical focus and challenging APA to provide evidence of the widespread claim that mental disorders are due to chemical imbalances in the brain. APA published a position statement in response and the two organizations exchanged views on the evidence.

The APA's DSM came under criticism from autism specialists Tony Attwood and Simon Baron-Cohen for proposing the elimination of Asperger's syndrome as a disorder and replacing it with an autism spectrum severity scale. Roy Richard Grinker wrote a controversial editorial for The New York Times expressing support for the proposal.

The APA president in 2005, Steven Sharfstein, praised the pharmaceutical industry but argued that American psychiatry had "allowed the biopsychosocial model to become the bio-bio-bio model" and accepted "kickbacks and bribes" from pharmaceutical companies leading to the over-use of medication and neglect of other approaches.

In 2008 APA was the focus of congressional investigations on how pharmaceutical industry money shapes the practices of nonprofit organizations that purport to be independent. The drug industry accounted in 2006 for about 30 percent of the association's $62.5 million in financing, half through drug advertisements in its journals and meeting exhibits, and the other half sponsoring fellowships, conferences and industry symposiums at its annual meeting. The APA came under increasing scrutiny and questions about conflicts of interest.

The APA president in 2009–10, Alan Schatzberg, was identified as the principal investigator on a federal study into the drug mifepristone for use as an antidepressant being developed by Corcept Therapeutics, a company Schatzberg had created and in which he had several million dollars' equity.

In 2021, the APA issued an apology for its historical role in perpetuating racism.

== See also ==
- American Board of Psychiatry and Neurology
- American Group Psychotherapy Association
- American Journal of Psychiatry
- American Psychoanalytic Association
- Royal College of Psychiatrists
