= Isaac Ray =

American psychiatrist (1807–1881)

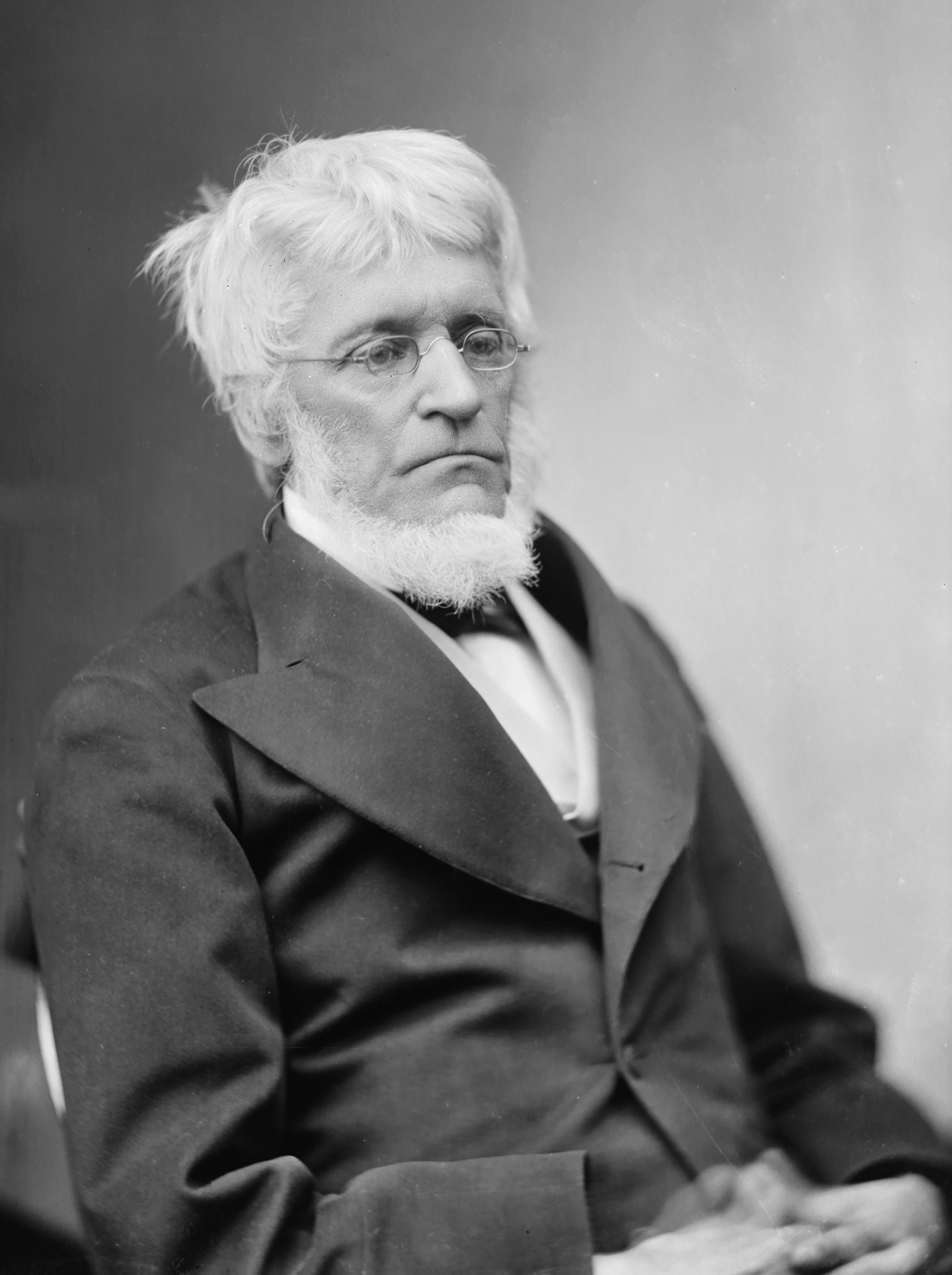
- Born: January 16, 1807; Beverly, Massachusetts, United States
- Died: March 31, 1881 (aged 74); Philadelphia, Pennsylvania, United States
- Occupation: Forensic psychiatrist
- Board member of: Association of Medical Superintendents of American Institutions for the Insane

Academic background
- Education: Phillips Academy (1822)
- Alma mater: Medical College of Maine (1827)

Academic work
- Notable works: A Treatise on the Medical Jurisprudence of Insanity (1838)

Isaac Ray (January 16, 1807 – March 31, 1881) was an American psychiatrist, known for being one of the founders of forensic psychiatry. Ray's 1838 work A Treatise on the Medical Jurisprudence of Insanity was a key text in developing a causational understanding and application of the insanity defense.

== Biography ==
A native of Beverly, Massachusetts, and a graduate of Phillips Academy (class of 1822), Ray received his medical degree in 1827 from the Medical College of Maine (Bowdoin College) and attempted to establish a general practice in Portland, Maine. When this venture failed, he moved to the coastal village of Eastport, where he practiced, taught, and wrote his Treatise on the Medical Jurisprudence of Insanity, published in 1838.

He was appointed superintendent of the State Hospital for the Insane in Augusta in 1841. In 1845 he moved to Providence, Rhode Island, to supervise the building of the private Butler Hospital and became its first superintendent. Before Butler Hospital received patients in 1847, Ray toured the asylums of Europe, reporting his findings in the American Journal of Insanity.

One of the founding members of the Association of Medical Superintendents of American Institutions for the Insane, he served as President from 1855 to 1859. Between 1828 and 1880, except for one year, he published at least one article every year, mainly dealing with insanity and its legal implications. Ray also published several important monographs, including Mental Hygiene (Boston, 1863) and Contributions to Mental Pathology (Boston, 1873).

In 1867, he moved to an active retirement in Philadelphia. In his retirement, he lived in the neighborhood of Powelton Village until his death, and was sent for burial in Rhode Island.

== Impact and legacy ==
The Treatise on the Medical Jurisprudence of Insanity was very influential and was deployed effectively by defense lawyer Sir Alexander Cockburn in the English trial of Daniel M'Naghten in 1843. At the trial, Cockburn quoted extensively from the book which rejected traditional views of the insanity defense based on the defendant's ability to distinguish "right from wrong" in favor of a broader approach based on causation.

In 1868, the Superintendents’ Association adopted his "Project of a Law," which recommended statutory enactment to secure the rights of the mentally ill and define the civil and criminal relationships of the insane.

In honor of him, the Isaac Ray Award was established in 1951. It is an annual award that recognizes a person who has made outstanding contributions to forensic psychiatry or psychiatric jurisprudence. Presented each year at the American Psychiatric Association (APA) annual meeting, it is a joint award of the American Psychiatric Association, and the American Academy of Psychiatry and the Law. Consisting of a prize of 1,500 USD and a plaque, the first winner of the award was Winfred Overholser.
