= Butler Hospital =

- Care New England

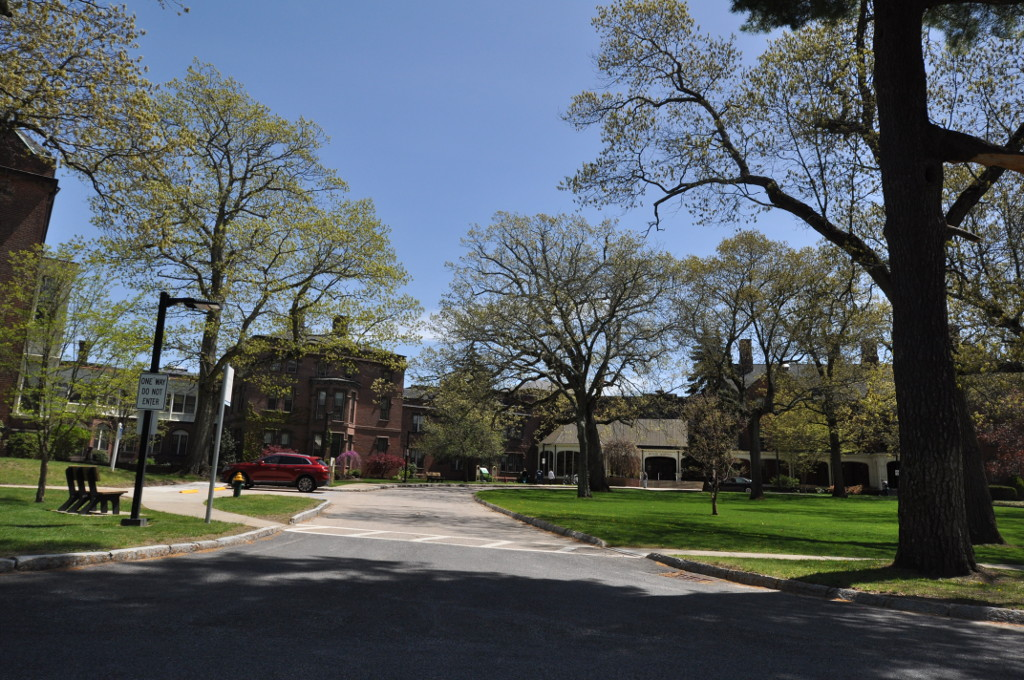

Geography
- Location: Providence, Rhode Island, United States
- Coordinates: 41°50′46.68″N 71°23′09.93″W

Organization
- Type: Specialist

Services
- Emergency department: No
- Speciality: Behavioral Health

History
- Constructed: 1844

Links
- Website: www.butler.org
- Lists: Hospitals in Rhode Island
- Butler Hospital
- U.S. National Register of Historic Places
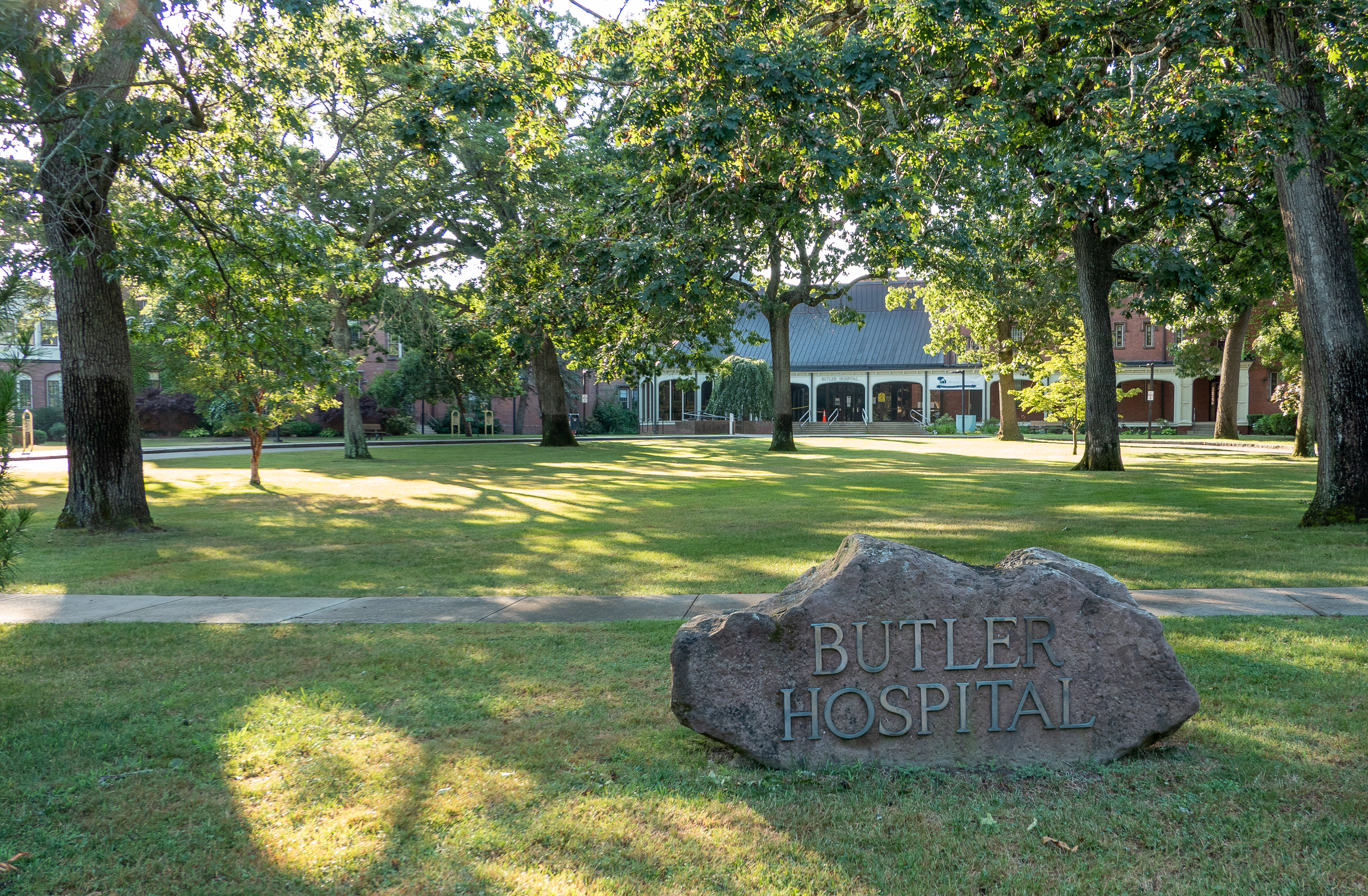
- Entrance

- Location within Rhode Island Location within the United States
- Location: 345 Blackstone Boulevard, Providence, Rhode Island
- Built: 1844
- Architect: Multiple
- Architectural style: Colonial Revival, Late Gothic Revival, Gothic Revival
- NRHP reference No.: 76000041
- Added to NRHP: October 8, 1976

Butler Hospital buildings

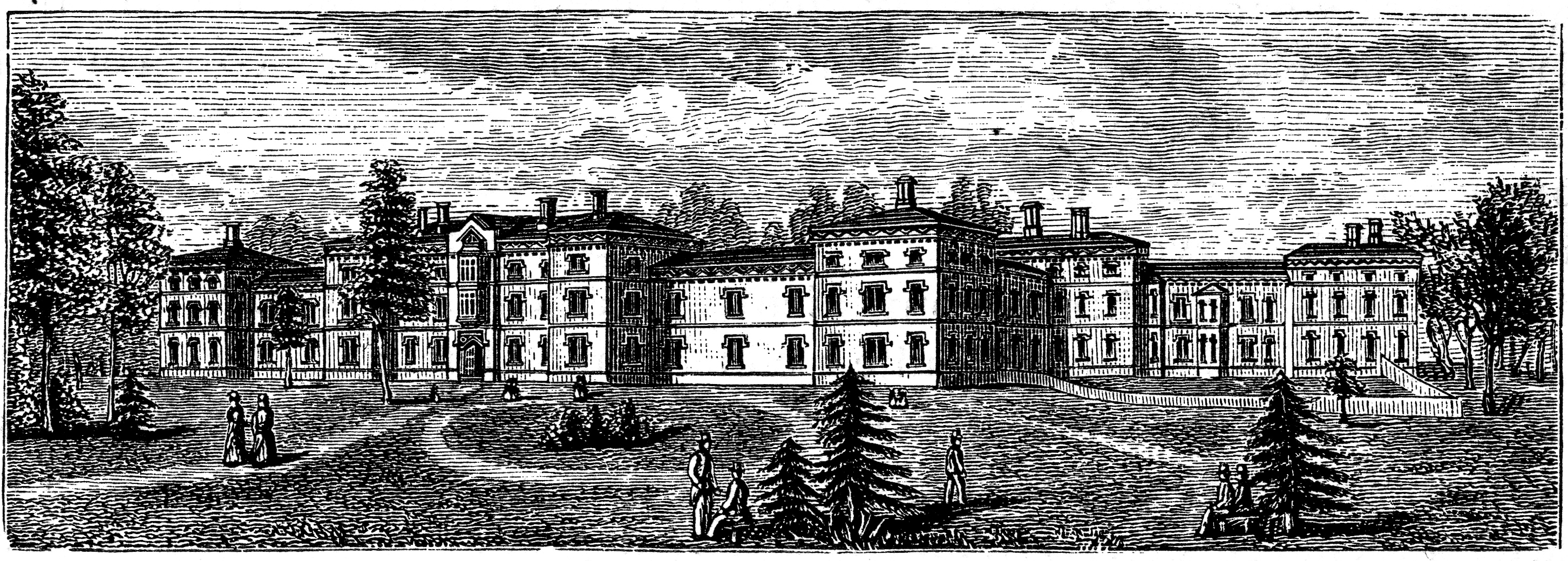
1886 engraving

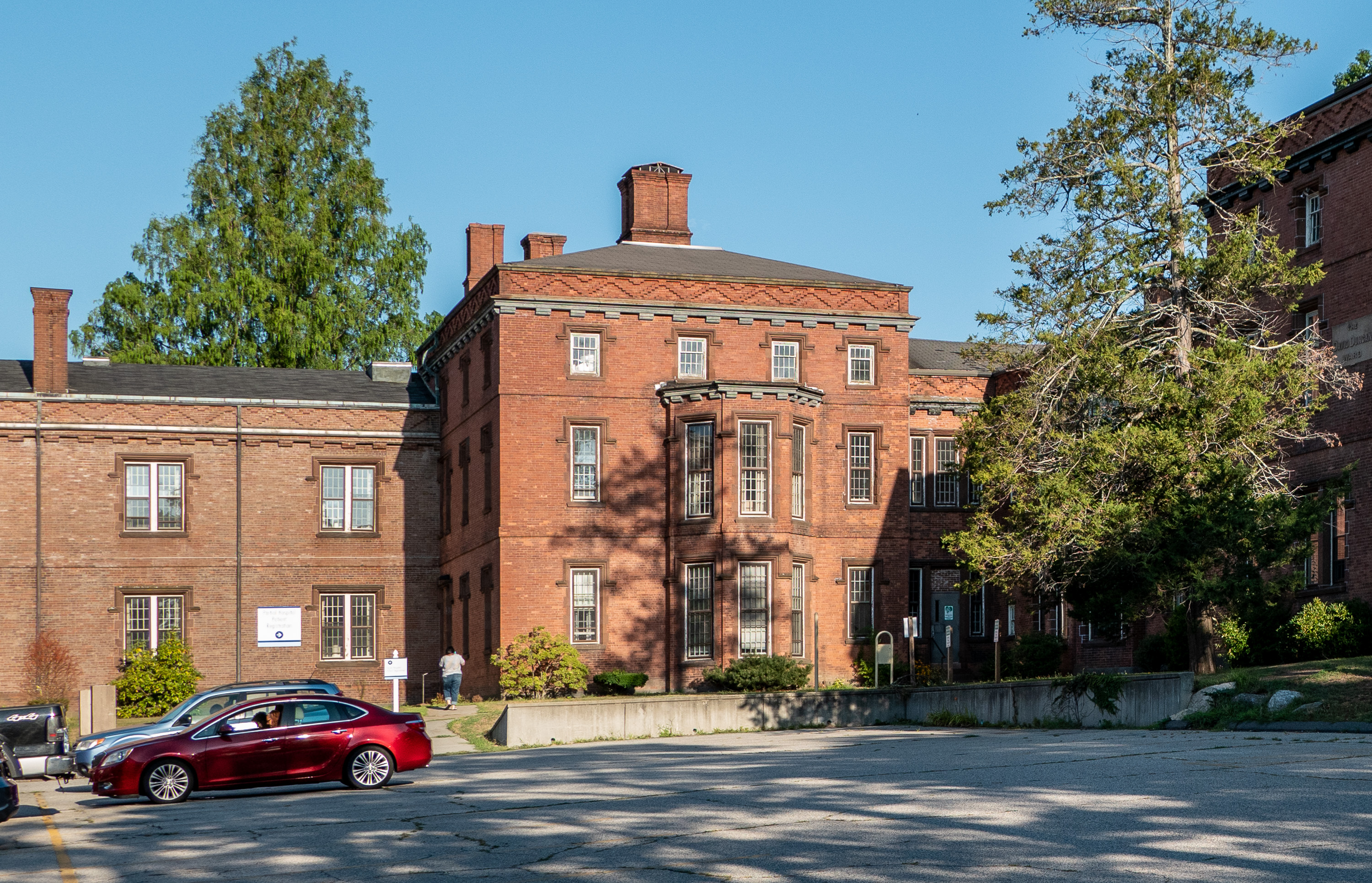
Duncan Building, Stone, Carpenter, and Willson (1875)

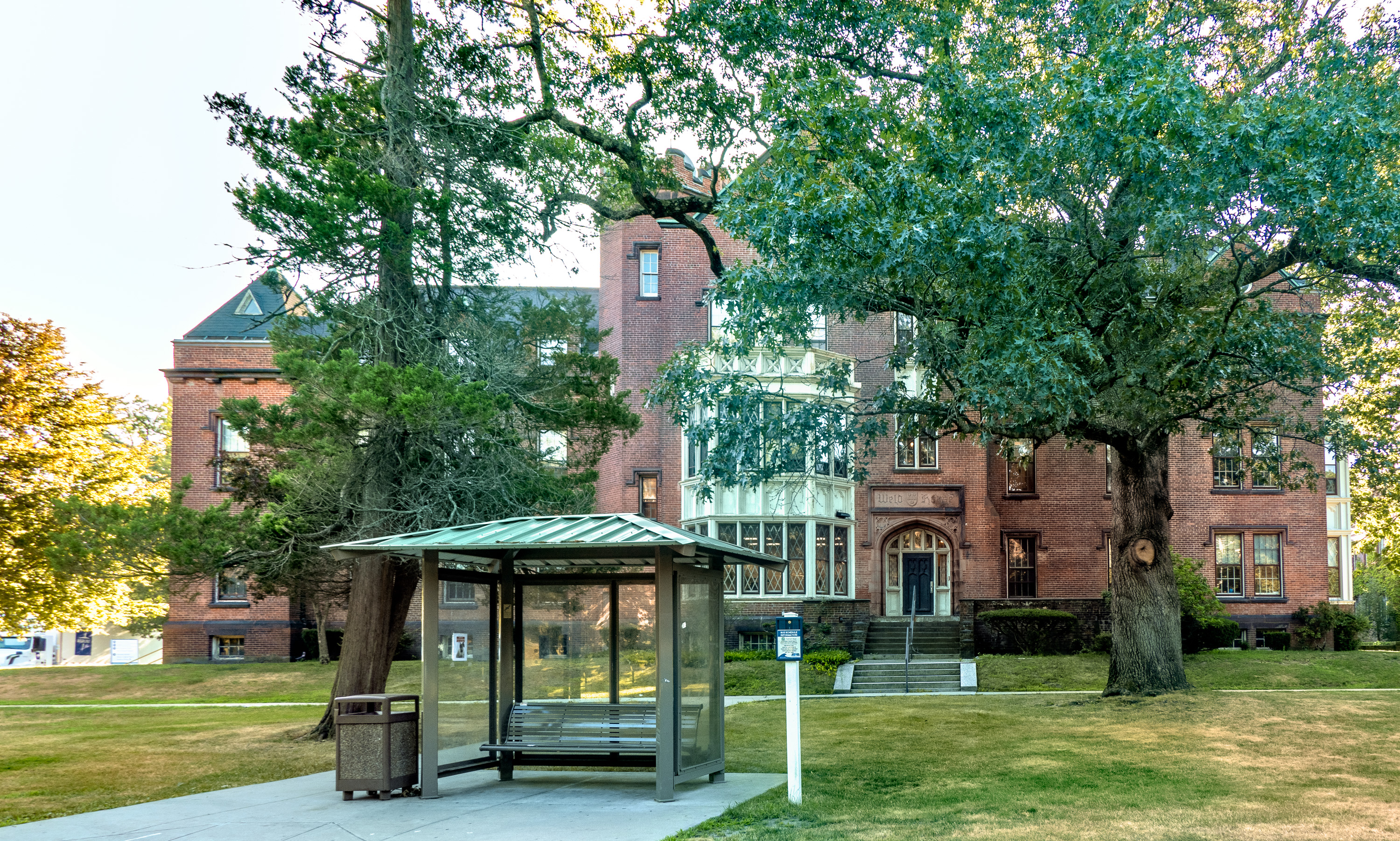
Weld House, Hoppin & Ely (1900)

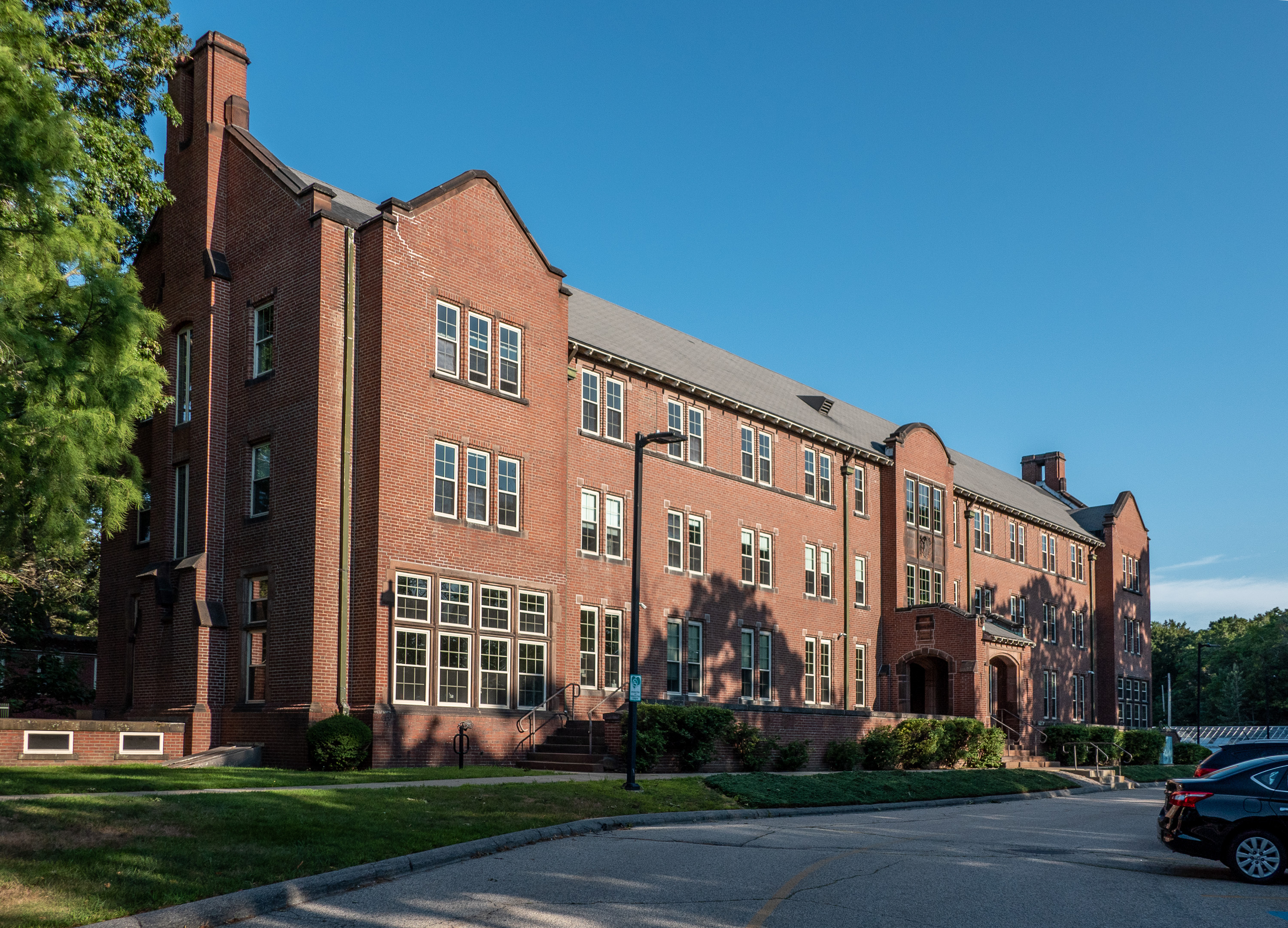
Potter Building, Jackson and Adams (1912)

Butler Hospital is a private, non-profit, psychiatric and substance abuse hospital for adolescents, adults, and seniors, located at 345 Blackstone Boulevard in Providence, Rhode Island. The hospital is affiliated with the Warren Alpert Medical School of Brown University, and serves as a teaching hospital for Brown University's department of psychiatry. Butler Hospital was a founding member, along with Women & Infants Hospital and Kent Hospital, of the Care New England health system in 1996.

== History ==
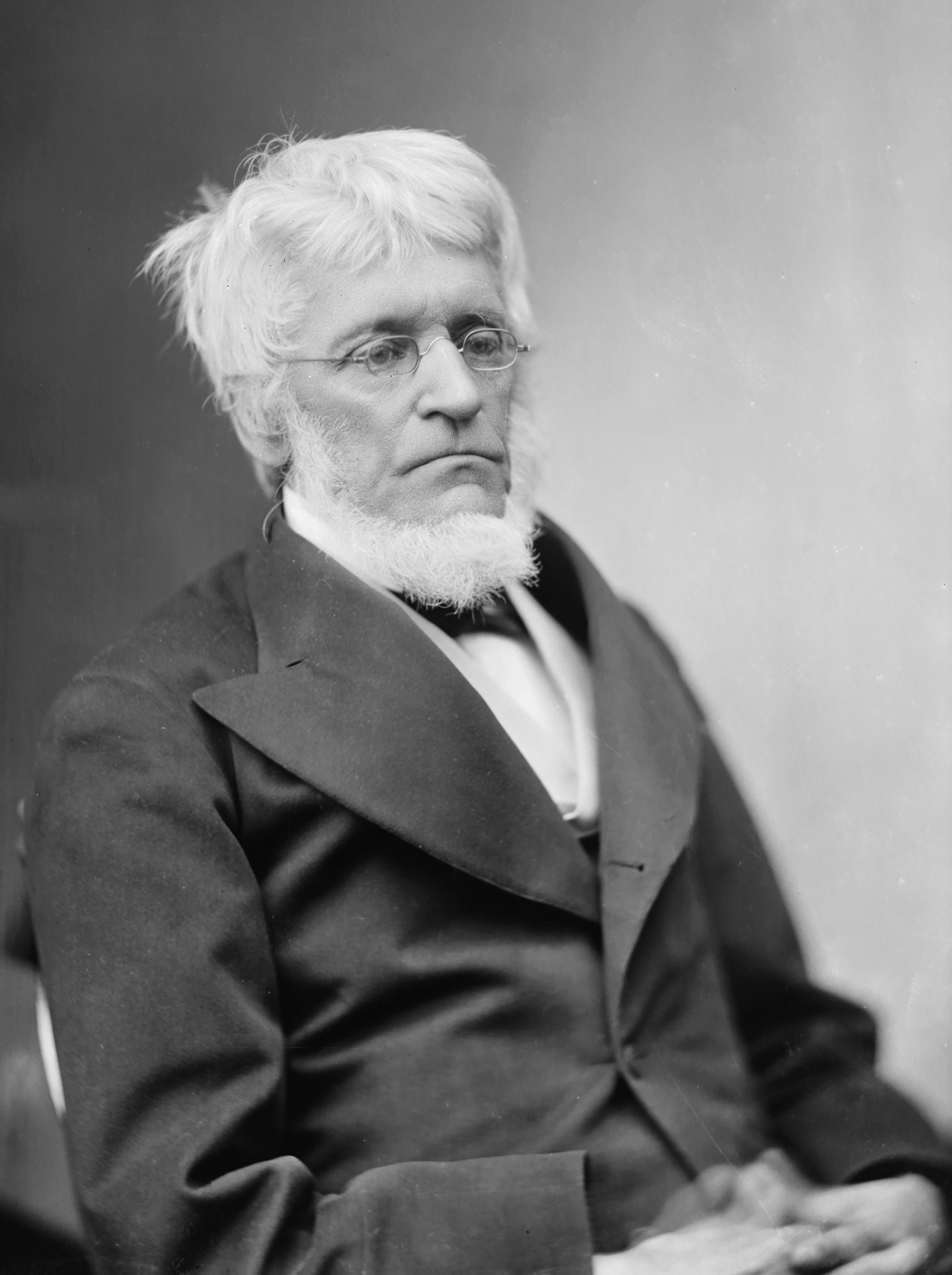
Isaac Ray, M.D., first superintendent of the hospital

The facility was founded in 1844 as Rhode Island's first exclusively mental health hospital. Industrialist Cyrus Butler donated heavily to the hospital, and it was named in his honor. Local Yankee philanthropist Nicholas Brown, Jr. also bequeathed a large amount of money to construct a mental health hospital which was used to fund the early hospital.

Butler Hospital's Gothic Revival complex was built beginning with its founding in 1844, and includes a 1731 farmhouse that stood on the property when it was acquired by the hospital. The hospital complex was listed on the National Register of Historic Places in 1976.

In 1996, Butler Hospital joined with Women & Infants Hospital and Kent Hospital to create the Care New England Health System.

== Current operations ==
Mary Marran is the president and chief operating officer.

== See also ==
- List of hospitals in Rhode Island
- National Register of Historic Places listings in Providence, Rhode Island
