= Thomas Aspinwall (consul) =

American diplomat and literary agent (1786–1876)

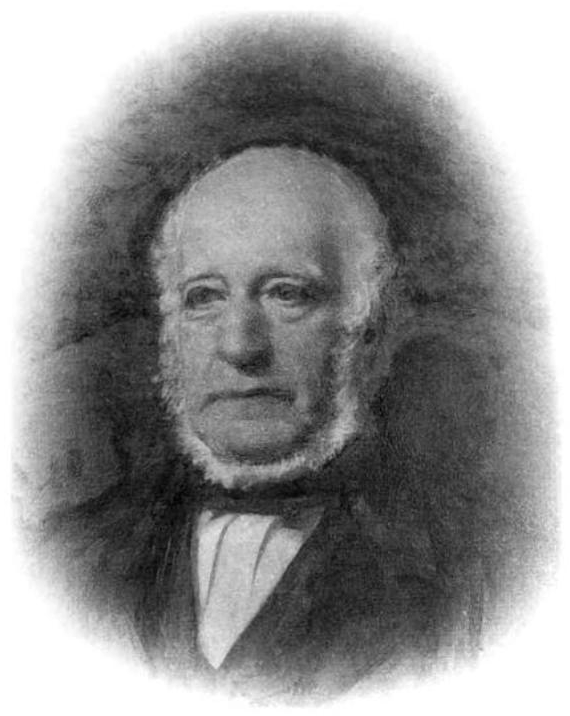

United States consul in London
- In office 1816–1854

Personal details
- Born: May 23, 1786 Brookline, Massachusetts
- Died: August 11, 1876 (aged 90) Boston, Massachusetts
- Resting place: Walnut Street Cemetery
- Spouse: Louise Elizabeth Poignand (m. 1814)
- Children: 7
- Education: Harvard College
- Occupation: Diplomat, literary agent, military officer
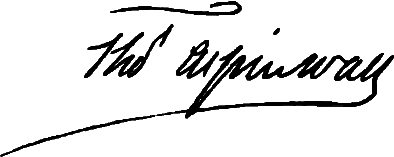
- Signature

Colonel Thomas Aspinwall (1786–1876) was the second-longest-serving United States consul, holding that position in London from 1816 to 1854.

== Biography ==
Thomas was born to Dr. William Aspinwall and Susanna Gardner in Brookline, Massachusetts, on May 23, 1786.

He matriculated at Harvard College in 1804 and graduated three years later, delivering the Latin valedictory address.

In the War of 1812, Aspinwall was appointed major of the Ninth Regiment, U.S. Infantry. In 1813 he was made a lieutenant-colonel and eventually a colonel on account of his valor in the battle of Sackett Harbor. In September 1814, during the Siege of Fort Erie, he sustained an injury to his left arm that required an amputation. In recognition of his service, President Madison appointed him consul to London during a recess, and he was confirmed at the beginning of the subsequent legislative session.

While in London, Aspinwall acted as a literary agent and a liaison between American authors and British publishers. The American historian and Hispanist William Prescott, for instance, engaged with him in this capacity, as did Washington Irving, who was a close friend. He also procured books for Americans unable to do so, as for instance in the case of the abolitionist Lewis Tappan, who was his brother-in-law.

He married Louise Elizabeth Poignand on February 13, 1814, and they had seven children.

Aspinwall died August 11, 1876, at his home in Boston. He was buried at Walnut Street Cemetery.
