= List of presidents of the American Psychiatric Association =

The American Psychiatric Association (APA) is the main professional organization of psychiatrists and trainee psychiatrists in the United States, and the largest psychiatric organization in the world. This is a list of presidents of the American Psychiatric Association.

Image	Name	Term	Notes	Ref.
	Samuel B. Woodward	1844–1848	First president, founded as the Association of Medical Superintendents of American Institutions for the Insane.	
	William Awl	1848–1851		
	Luther Bell	1851–1855		
	Isaac Ray	1855–1859		
	Andrew McFarland	1859–1862		
	Thomas Story Kirkbride	1862–1870		
	John S. Butler	1870–1873		
	Charles Nichols	1873–1879		
	Clement Walker	1879–1882		
	J. H. Callender	1882–1883		
	John P. Gray	1883–1884		
	Pliny Earle	1884–1885		
	Orpheus Everts	1885–1886		
	H. A. Buttolph	1886–1887		
	Eugene Grissom	1887–1888		
	John B. Chapin	1888–1889		
	W. W. Godding	1889–1890		
	H. P. Stearns	1890–1891	Organization name changed to American Medico-Psychological Association	
	Daniel Clark	1891–1892		
	J. B. Andrews	1892–1893		
	John Curwen	1893–1894		
	Edward Cowles	1894–1895		
	Richard Dewey	1895–1896		
	Theophilus O. Powell	1896–1897		
	Richard M. Bucke	1897–1898		
	Henry M. Hurd	1898–1899		
	Joseph G. Rogers	1899–1900		
	Peter M. Wise	1900–1901		
	Robert J. Preston	1901–1902		
	A. B. Richardson	1902–1903	Died before taking office.	
	G. Adler Bloomer	1902–1903		
	A. E. Macdonald	1903–1904		
	T. J. W. Burgess	1904–1905		
	C. B. Burr	1905–1906		
	Charles G. Hill	1906–1907		
	Charles P. Bancroft	1907–1908		
	Arthur F. Kilbourne	1908–1909		
	William F. Drewry	1909–1910		
	Charles W. Pilgrim	1910–1911		
	Hubert Work	1911–1912		
	James T. Searcy	1912–1913		
	Carlos Frederick MacDonald	1913–1914		
	Samuel E. Smith	1914–1915		
	Edward N. Brush	1915–1916		
	Charles G. Wagner	1916–1917		
	James V. Anglin	1917–1918		
	Elmer E. Southard	1918–1919		
	Henry C. Eyman	1919–1920		
	Owen Copp	1920–1921		
	Albert Moore Barrett	1921–1922		
	Henry W. Mitchell	1922–1923		
	Thomas W. Salmon	1923–1924	Mental hygiene advocate and chief consultant psychiatrist to the American Expeditionary Forces during World War I	
	William Alanson White	1924–1925		
	C. Floyd Haviland	1925–1926		
	George M. Kline	1926–1927		
	Adolf Meyer	1927–1928		
	Samuel T. Orton	1928–1929		
	Earl D. Bond	1929–1930		
	Walter M. English	1930–1931		
	William L. Russell	1931–1932		
	James Vance May	1932–1933		
	George H. Kirby	1933–1934		
	C. Fred Williams	1934–1935		
	Clarence O. Cheney	1935–1936		
	C. Macfie Campbell	1936–1937		
	Ross McClure Chapman	1937–1938		
	Richard H. Hutchings	1938–1939		
	William C. Sandy	1939–1940		
	George H. Stevenson	1940–1941		
	H. Douglas Singer	1941–1942	Died before taking office.	
	James King Hall	1941–1942		
	Arthur H. Ruggles	1942–1943		
	Edward Strecker	1943–1944	Graduated from Jefferson University in 1911; professor of mental and nervous diseases (1925-1931)	
	Karl M. Bowman	1944–1946		
	Samuel W. Hamilton	1946–1947		
	Winfred Overholser Sr.	1947–1948		
	William C. Menninger	1948–1949		
	George S. Stevenson	1949–1950		
	John C. Whitehorn	1950–1951	Psychiatrist in Chief from 1941–1960 at Johns Hopkins University and the chairman of the Department of Psychiatry	
	Leo H. Bartemeier	1951–1952		
	Donald Ewen Cameron	1952–1953		
	Kenneth E. Appel	1953–1954		
	Arthur Percy Noyes	1954–1955		
	R. Finley Gayle Jr.	1955–1956		
	Francis J. Braceland	1956–1957		
	Harry C. Solomon	1957–1958		
	Francis J. Gerty	1958–1959		
	William Malamud	1959–1960		
	Robert H. Felix	1960–1961		
	Walter E. Barton	1961–1962		
	C. H. Hardin Branch	1962–1963		
	Jack R. Ewalt	1963–1964		
	Daniel Blain	1964–1965	First medical director of the American Psychiatric Association and founder of the newsletter that became Psychiatric Services	
	Howard P. Rome	1965–1966		
	Harvey J. Tompkins	1966–1967		
	Henry W. Brosin	1967–1968		
	Lawrence C. Kolb	1968–1969		
	Raymond W. Waggoner	1969–1970		
	Robert S. Garber	1970–1971		
	Ewald W. Busse	1971–1972		
	Perry Clement Talkingten	1972–1973		
	Alfred M. Freedman	1973–1974	Led the effort to de-classify homosexuality as a mental illness	
	John Patrick Spiegel	1974–1975	103rd president	
	Judd Marmor	1975–1976		
	Robert W. Gibson	1976–1977		
	Jack Weinberg	1977–1978		
	Jules H. Masserman	1978–1979		
	Alan A. Stone	1979–1980		
	Donald G. Langsley	1980–1981		
	Daniel X. Freedman	1981–1982		
	H. Keith H. Brodie	1982–1983		
	George Tarjan	1983–1984		
	John A. Talbott	1984–1985	113th president	
	Carol Nadelson	1985–1986	First female president of the American Psychiatric Association, first female editor-in-chief of the American Psychiatric Association Press, and first director of Partners Office for Women's Careers at Brigham and Women’s Hospital	
	Robert O. Pasnau	1986–1987		
	George H. Pollock	1987–1988		
	Paul J. Fink	1988–1989		
	Herbert Pardes	1989–1990		
	Elissa P. Benedek	1990–1991		
	Lawrence Hartmann	1991–1992		
	Joseph T. English	1992–1993		
	John S. McIntyre	1993–1994		
	Jerry M. Wiener	1994–1995		
	Mary Jane England	1995–1996		
	Harold Eist	1996–1997		
	Herbert S. Sacks	1997–1998		
	Rodrigo A. Muñoz	1998–1999		
	Allan Tasman	1999–2000		
	Daniel B. Borenstein	2000–2001		
	Richard K. Harding	2001–2002		
	Paul S. Appelbaum	2002–2003		
	Marcia Kraft Goin	2003–2004		
	Michelle Riba	2004–2005		
	Steven Sharfstein	2005–2006		
	Pedro Ruiz	2006–2007		
	Carolyn Robinowitz	2007–2008		
	Nada Logan Stotland	2008–2009		
	Alan F. Schatzberg	2009–2010		
	Carol A. Bernstein	2010–2011		
	John M. Oldham	2011–2012		
	Dilip V. Jeste	2012–2013	First Asian-American president of the APA	
	Jeffrey Lieberman	2013–2014	Chair of Columbia University Department of Psychiatry, principal investigator for the NIMH CATIE study	
	Paul Summergrad	2014–2015	Dr. Frances S. Arkin professor and chairman of the Department of Psychiatry at the Tufts University School of Medicine; psychiatrist-in-chief of the Tufts Medical Center	
	Renée Binder	2015–2016	Associate dean of academic affairs, School of Medicine, University of California, San Francisco (UCSF); forensic psychiatry fellowship director, UCSF Department of Psychiatry	
	Maria A. Oquendo	2016–2017	Frst Latina president of the APA; professor and chairman of psychiatry at the University of Pennsylvania Perelman School of Medicine	
	Anita Everett	2017–2018	Chief medical officer, Substance Abuse and Mental Health Services Administration; Director of the Office of Chief Medical Officers (OCMO)	
	Altha Stewart	2018–2019	First African-American president of APA; associate professor of psychiatry and director, Center for Health in Justice Involved Youth, University of Tennessee Health Science Center	
	Bruce J. Schwartz	2019–2020	Deputy chair and clinical director of psychiatry and behavioral sciences, Montefiore Einstein Medical Center andAlbert Einstein College of Medicine; president of the Montefiore Behavioral Care IPA; medical director and founding member of University Behavioral Associates	
	Jeffery Geller	2020–2021	Director of public sector psychiatry and professor of psychiatry at UMass Chan Medical School; medical director and staff psychiatrist, Worcester Recovery Center and Hospital.	
	Vivian Pender	2021–2022	Clinical professor of psychiatry, Weill Cornell Medical College; training psychoanalyst, Columbia University; founder of Healthcare Against Trafficking; consultant psychiatrist and psychoanalyst to the United Nations	
	Rebecca W. Brendel	2022–2023	Director of the Master of bioethics program, associate director of the Center for Bioethics, and an associate professor of psychiatry at Harvard Medical School; director of law and ethics at the Center for Law, Brain, and Behavior at Massachusetts General Hospital	
	Petros Levounis	2023–2024	Professor and chair of the Department of Psychiatry and associate dean for professional development at Rutgers New Jersey Medical School; chief of service at University Hospital; director of the Addiction Institute of New York at Columbia University	
	Ramaswamy Viswanathan	2024–2025	153rd president	
	Theresa Miskimen	2025–2026	Current president	
