= Lucy Ozarin =

American psychiatrist (1914–2017)

Lieutenant Commander Lucy Ozarin
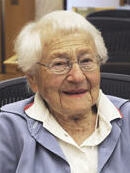
- Ozarin in 2012
- Born: Lucy Dorothy Ozarin; August 18, 1914; Brooklyn, New York, U.S.
- Died: September 17, 2017 (aged 103); Maryland, U.S.
- Resting place: Wellwood Cemetery, West Babylon, New York
- Education: New York University, New York Medical College, Harvard University School of Public Health
- Occupation: Psychiatrist
- Military career
- Allegiance: United States of America
- Branch: United States Navy
- Rank: Lieutenant Commander
- Unit: United States Navy Reserve Medical Corps

Lucy Dorothy Ozarin (August 18, 1914 – September 17, 2017) was a psychiatrist who served in the United States Navy. She was one of the first women psychiatrists commissioned in the Navy, and she was one of seven female Navy psychiatrists who served during World War II.

== Early years and education ==
Ozarin was born in the Brownsville neighborhood of Brooklyn, New York, on August 18, 1914, the youngest of four children. Her parents were Russian immigrants who had met and married in the United States.

When she was seven years old, her family moved to Inwood on Long Island, New York. Her family was the only Jewish family in the town. While attending school, she and her siblings all worked at their father's general store in Inwood. She excelled throughout school, graduating from Lawrence High School at the age of sixteen. The school's Parent-Teacher Association awarded Ozarin a scholarship of $150 per year.

Ozarin attended New York University, just as each of her siblings had. During her first year of college, Ozarin played for the school's women's varsity basketball team and worked as an umbrella salesperson at Macy's on Saturdays. She was a member of the Lambda Gamma Phi sorority and Aesclepiad, a woman's pre-medical honor society. After three years at New York University, Ozarin entered medical school at New York Medical College. Ozarin was one of six women enrolled in a class of one-hundred. Ozarin earned a doctor of medicine degree in 1937.

== Civilian career ==
Ozarin worked as a resident at Harlem Hospital in pediatrics for two years. During five months of that time, Ozarin worked on an ambulance, which she found exciting.

Given the choice between treating patients with tuberculosis or mental illness, Ozarin chose the latter because it was not a communicable disease. Ozarin then worked as a resident at Westchester County Hospital's small psychiatric unit.

Seven months into the position, her father suffered a stroke, and she decided to move near Buffalo, New York, where he was living at the time. Ozarin worked at the Gowanda State Hospital for three years. Ozarin began in the acute ward and then later transferred to the chronic ward. Ozarin had five-hundred patients under her care. Finding that the hospital's chronic psychiatric patients were being kept in very poor conditions, Ozarin tried to improve their conditions while she was there.

== Military career ==
When the United States entered World War II, the hospital's male psychiatrists left, and Ozarin found herself the only physician for a thousand patients, most of whom had schizophrenia. Ozarin felt it was impossible to perform her job well when she was spread so thin.

Legislation established Women Accepted for Volunteer Emergency Service as a branch of the United States Naval Reserve in 1942. Inspired in part by her brother's decision to join the military as an engineer in 1942, Ozarin decided she join as well. The hospital's superintendent would not approve Ozarin's request for leave, so Ozarin resigned her position instead.

Ozarin temporarily worked as Assistant to the Superintendent at New York's Metropolitan Hospital for six months until she was sworn into the Navy. The Navy's commissioning document was intended to be used for a man, and the form referred to Ozarin using male pronouns. Ozarin's title was Assistant Surgeon, Lieutenant Junior Grade. Ozarin was one of the first seven female psychiatrists with commissioned officer status in the United States Navy.

Without undergoing any military training at all, Ozarin was immediately assigned to Bethesda, Maryland, in October 1943, reporting to Captain Forrest Martin Harrison. Ozarin spent four months working in a military hospital until she received orders to report to Camp Lejeune.

At the time, there were 33,000 men and 3,000 women stationed at Camp Lejeune. It had two female physicians who were both assigned to the dependents clinic located outside the base. The commander of the hospital gave Ozarin the impression that he respected neither women nor the field of psychiatry. Ozarin was told to do physical examinations on applicants for employment at the hospital, which Ozarin found to be waste of her skills, particularly when doctors with just ninety days of psychiatric training were treating psychiatry patients.

After a few weeks, a colleague in Bethesda helped Ozarin secure a transfer to the WAVES training station at Hunter College in New York City. Ozarin was one of three woman physicians at Hunter College. Ozarin conducted psychiatric examinations of the women entering WAVES and SPARS.

In February 1945, Ozarin was given orders to return to Bethesda to treat WAVES who were suffering from anxiety and other issues. When she was not seeing patients, Ozarin studied at St. Elizabeth's Hospital in Washington, D.C. At the end of World War II, Ozarin thought the Navy would soon no longer require her service, and she began to look elsewhere. She applied for a child psychiatry fellowship, but she was not accepted. She passed the American Board of Psychiatry and Neurology in Psychiatry later that year in order to increase her worth on the job market.

== Post-military career ==
Following the end of World War II, the Navy began discharging its physicians in 1946. Ozarin returned to New York state to live with her parents, while remaining in the Naval Reserves. Looking for work, she networked with a fellow Navy orientee Mike Spotswood who recommended she apply to work at the Veterans Administration. It took brief interviews with Dr. Harvey Thompkins and Dr. Daniel Blain to secure a position as Assistant Chief of Hospital Psychiatry. Within a year, Ozarin was promoted to Chief of Hospital Psychiatry. While working at the Veterans Administration, Ozarin asked Thompkins why so many patients were in the hospital for ten years, and Thompkins responded with an assignment. Ozarin visited all of the Veterans Administration's mental hospitals and about seventy of its general hospitals to investigate the backlog for mental health services and monitor the care provided to patients with mental illness. Ozarin wrote an article for Reader's Digest about chronic psychiatric patients who never received visitors, but the Veterans Administration would not allow its publication. Reader's Digest paid $200 to Ozarin for the article, which she then donated to a patients' fund at Tuskagee Hospital, a greatly underfunded hospital.

In the early 1950s, Ozarin traveled to Bethel, Maine, for the National Training Laboratories' two-week T-group training, led by sociologists. When Ozarin returned, she set up T-groups and other new programs for the psychiatric patients at the Veterans Administration's hospitals. Ozarin also started a training institute at Coatsville VA Medical Hospital where the Veterans Administration's clinical directors would discuss advances in psychiatry.

Ozarin decided to give up her military commission and the Navy Reserves in 1957. She joined the United States Public Health Service the same year. For three years, Ozarin worked as the medical officer of its regional office in Kansas City, where she stimulated mental health activities and made sure funding was spent in accordance with rules and regulations. Ozarin advocated for treating psychiatric patients for their illnesses, and preserving the patients' freedom, dignity, and equality as psychiatric necessities as part of the treatment. Ozarin attended the Harvard University School of Public Health, earning a Masters in Public Health in 1961. She returned to the Kansas City regional office after graduation.

When President of the United States John F. Kennedy signed the Community Mental Health Act of 1963, the National Institute of Mental Health chose Ozarin as one of five people to write the regulations and establish community mental health centers across the country. In order to determine what form a community mental health center should have, Ozarin traveled around the country, evaluating psychiatric services provided by medical facilities to determine what was effective. After writing the regulations, Ozarin evaluated and approved applications for grants to replace long-stay psychiatric hospitals with less-isolated community mental health centers for people with a mental illness or a developmental disability. Ozarin said the costs of building of local psychiatric treatment centers was costly "just as all medical care is costly" but she asked "What is the alternative? It is also costly for families to be disrupted and for people to be disabled for long periods of time." Ozarin was a proponent of the deinstitutionalization of psychiatric patients, and she advocated for the eliminating the social stigma of psychiatric treatment.

Ozarin returned to the National Institute of Mental Health, where she developed new programs to help people with mental illness. Ozarin helped bring psychiatrists and social workers to medical facilities in rural areas, making it easier for people with mental illnesses living in rural areas to receive treatment.

Around 1972, Ozarin was based in Copenhagen, Denmark, researching treatment programs for drug and alcohol addiction in nine European countries for the World Health Organization. As part of her research, Ozarin met with officials at each country's Ministry of Health and visited each country's mental health facilities. After writing a report about each country's mental health services, Ozarin convened a meeting on improving alcohol and drug programs that was attended by people from 21 countries. In the early 1980s, the World Health Organization selected Ozarin to serve as its drug-abuse officer, based in Copenhagen, for nine months.

Ozarin worked until her retirement in 1983.

== Retirement ==
Beginning in the mid-1980s and continuing for about 25 years, Ozarin began volunteering for the American Psychiatric Association. Ozarin went over every single book in the American Psychiatric Association's Melvin Sabshin Library and Archives and made sure they were all entered into its online catalog.

Ozarin volunteered for the National Library of Medicine in the History of Medicine Division from 2004 to 2013. During the Civil War, the Surgeon General John Shaw Billings had collected every medical book published in the country and every publication about public health and state medicine. Ozarin took it upon herself to catalog them, about twenty- to thirty-thousand documents and publications so that medical researchers would be able to find and learn from them. During this project, Ozarin learned a great deal about the history of medicine in the United States.

Ozarin sorted and cataloged hundreds of medical dissertations from the 18th century. It was during this project that Ozarin discovered the medical dissertation of Benjamin Rush, one of the founders of American psychiatry and a signer of the United States Declaration of Independence.

Ozarin wrote most of the text and selected images for the National Library of Medicine's web site, Diseases of the Mind: Highlights of American Psychiatry to 1900. She sorted through its collection of 20,000 items as part of her research. For her work, Ozarin received a Director's Honor Award in 2008. She also received the Distinguished Service Award from the American Psychiatric Association in 2007.

During her late nineties, Ozarin wrote over fifty biographies of notable psychiatrists that she wished to be published on Wikipedia. For twenty years, Ozarin spent Saturday afternoons volunteering at the kitchen of Suburban Hospital in Bethesda, Maryland, after the end of her synagogue's Shabbat services. Ozarin was an active member of the senior citizen's group at her synagogue. She represented her apartment house at the National Institutes of Health Community Council in order to stay connected to the National Institutes of Health and to maintain access to its campus and facilities. Ozarin read medical journals every week, something she started doing in medical school.

Ozarin considered physical activity, a good diet, and a modicum of religion and faith to be her key to a long life. Looking back, Ozarin was grateful for the opportunities she had, as well as for her courage, intelligence, and creativity that led her to take advantage of opportunities when she saw them. Asked during an interview what message she wanted to leave to young people for their future, Ozarin said, "Take advantage of your advantages. Be willing to take risks. ... If you have a question, and you know who to go to, don't call them up, go to see them because you never know what else you're going to learn. ... Look for openings. Look for places where you can go. And dream."^{p. 45}

Ozarin died in September 2017, at the age of 103.

In Fall 2019, Dr. Ozarin's student microscope was donated to the NIH Stetten Museum in Bethesda, Maryland. It is a 1932-3 Bausch and Lomb Type H, Model HA. It has been accessioned by the museum's curator, and it is searchable through the museum's online archive.

== Works ==
- Ozarin, Lucy D.; Thomas, Claudewell S. "Advocacy in Community Mental Health Programs". American Journal of Public Health. April 1972. 62 (4). 557–559.
- Ozarin, Lucy D. "The Community Mental Health Center—A Public Health Facility". American Journal of Public Health and the Nation's Health. January 1966. 56 (1). p. 26–31.
- Ozarin, Lucy D.; Levenson, Alan I. "Community Mental Health Centers Program After Four Years' Experience". Public Health Reports. November 1967. 82 (11). p. 941–945.
- Ozarin, Lucy. "Daniel Blain: Founder of This Journal". Psychiatric Services. 50 (12). December 1999. p. 1563.
- Ozarin, Lucy D. Existing patterns of services for alcoholism and drug dependence: Report. World Health Organization. 1973.
- Ozarin, Lucy. "Kirkbride: Hospital Innovator". Psychiatric News. American Psychiatric Association. October 6, 2000.
- Ozarin, Lucy D.; Feldman, Saul. "Implications for Health Service Delivery: The Community Mental Health Centers Amendments of 1970". Journal of American Public Health. September 1971. 61 (9). p. 1780–1784.
- Ozarin, Lucy D. Mental Health Services in Rural America. Hospital & Community Psychiatry. 34 (3). March 1983.
- Ozarin, Lucy. "Moral Insanity: A Brief History". Psychiatric News. American Psychiatric Association. May 18, 2001.
- Ozarin, Lucy. "Pioneering Psychiatrist Made Connection Between Mind, Body". Psychiatric News. January 19, 2001.
- Ozarin, Lucy D. "The Pros and Cons of Case Management" in J.A. Talbott (editor) The Chronic Mental Patient: Problems, Solutions, and Recommendations for a Public Policy. American Psychiatric Association. 1978. p. 165–170.
- Ozarin, Lucy. "A Psychiatric Pioneer Remembered". Psychiatric News. American Psychiatric Association. March 3, 2006.
- Ozarin, Lucy. "Psychiatry During the U.S. Civil War". Psychiatric News. American Psychiatric Association. January 21, 2000.
- Ozarin, Lucy D.; Samuels, Michael E.; Biedenkapp, John. "Need for Mental Health Services in Federally Funded Rural Primary Health Care Systems". Public Health Reports. July–August 1978. 93(4). p. 351–355.
- Ozarin, Lucy D.; Sharfstein, Steven S.; Albert, Mathieu. "Integrating Mental Health and General Health Care". The Hillside Journal of Clinical Psychiatry. 3 (1). 1981. p. 97–105.
- Williams, Richard H.; Ozarin, Lucy D. Community Mental Health: An International Perspective Hardcover. Jossey-Bass. 1968.
