= Daniel Offer =

American psychiatrist

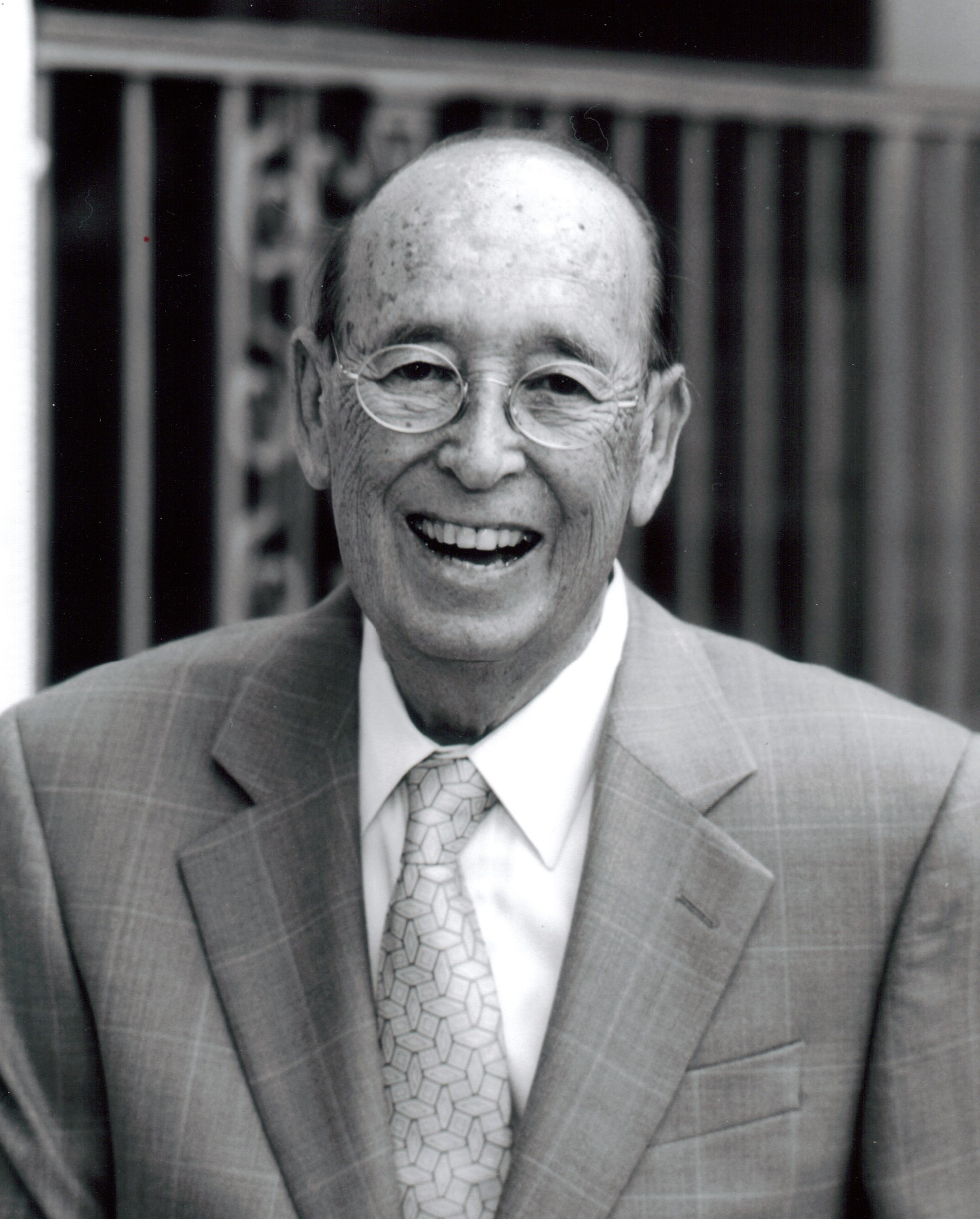
- Dr. Daniel Offer (2007)
- Born: Thomas Edgar Hirsch; December 24, 1929
- Died: May 13, 2013 (aged 83); Mercer Island, Washington, United States
- Citizenship: American, Israeli
- Education: University of Chicago Pritzker School of Medicine; University of Rochester
- Known for: Offer Longitudinal Study, Offer Self-Image Questionnaire for Adolescents (OSIQ), the study of Normality (behavior) and Journal of Youth and Adolescence (founding editor)
- Scientific career
- Fields: Child and adolescent psychiatry, Normality (behavior) and Leadership
- Workplaces: Michael Reese Hospital, University of Chicago Pritzker School of Medicine and Northwestern University Feinberg School of Medicine

Daniel Offer (December 24, 1929 – May 13, 2013) was a psychiatrist and scholar who challenged prevailing beliefs that adolescence is inherently a time of storm and stress. His Offer Longitudinal Study was one of the first studies of typical youth over time and demonstrated that most pass through adolescence adequately happy and connected to families and others. This contribution shifted fundamentally how adolescent development was understood scientifically and provoked recognition that theory from patient populations was inadequate. He is also remembered for his scholarship on normality, the viability of memory, the Offer Self Image Questionnaire and for fostering the field of adolescent developmental studies.

== Biography ==
Daniel Offer was born in Berlin, Germany, on December 24, 1929. He was the son of Walter Hirsch, M.D. a pediatrician, and Ilse Hirsch, née Meyer. He was a grandson of Professor Ludwig Ferdinand Meyer, M.D., a pediatric gastroenterologist and director of the Emperor and Empress Friedrich Children’s Hospital in Berlin, Germany. After the rise of Nazism in April 1933, both his father and his grandfather lost their jobs. The two families immigrated to Palestine in 1936. Offer grew up in Jerusalem and, in February 1948, he joined the Palmach (Strike Force) of the Israeli army. At that time he changed his name from Thomas Edgar Hirsch to Daniel Offer. He left the Israel Defense Forces as a staff sergeant in 1950. He then attended the University of Rochester, in Rochester, New York. He continued his education at the University of Chicago Pritzker School of Medicine, graduating in 1957.

Offer served an internship at the University of Illinois Medical Center, Chicago, Illinois, followed by a psychiatric residency at Michael Reese Hospital, Chicago, Illinois (1958 to 1961). He remained at Michael Reese until 1990. During that time he was chairman of the Department of Psychiatry from 1977 to 1987. From 1973 to 1990 he served on the faculty of the University of Chicago Medical School, becoming professor of psychiatry in 1974. In 1990 he became professor of psychiatry and behavioral sciences at Northwestern University Feinberg School of Medicine, attaining emeritus status in 2008.

Offer was married to Judith Baskin Offer from 1961 until her death in 1976. In 1979 he married Marjorie Kaiz Offer. They were married until his death in 2013. He had three children and six grandchildren.

=== Life on dialysis ===
In June 1999, Offer began dialysis due to renal failure. In order to help fellow renal patients navigate the world of dialysis, he wrote with his wife, Marjorie Kaiz Offer, and his daughter Susan Offer Szafir, a guide to dealing with dialysis. The book incorporates interviews with nephrologists, nurses, social workers, dieticians, technicians and dialysis patients and their families.

== Career ==
=== Adolescent psychiatry ===
==== The Offer longitudinal study ====
In 1963 Offer realized that very little was known about the development of normal (i.e. non-patient) adolescents. He received eight years of federal grants to study the psychological development of normal adolescents. In the first phase of the study seventy three boys were selected from two suburban Chicago area high schools and followed for eight years. The major finding for the high school phase was that stability and not turmoil was the overriding characteristic of normal adolescents. This finding contradicted the then current notion of normal development. At that time it was believed that all adolescents go through major turmoil as they move through the high school years. The four years of the post high school phase of the school substantiated this finding. Two books resulted from the adolescent phase of the study. In 1996–1997, 94% of the original sample were reinterviewed. They were now 48. The original finding held. All were well adjusted late middle-aged individuals. The major finding was the discovery that well-adjusted adults do not remember their adolescence accurately. The data showed that there is essentially no correlation between what the subjects as adults thought and felt about their adolescence and what they actually thought and felt when they were adolescents. This phase of the study was covered in the book "Regular Guys".

==== The Offer Self-Image Questionnaire (OSIQ) ====
The OSIQ is a psychological test developed in 1962 which uses 129 items and twelve scales to assess teenager’s adjustment in areas such as impulse control, emotional well-being, peer relationships, family relationships, coping ability and sexuality. Over the years the OSIQ became a popular psychological test used in many countries throughout the world. It has been translated into twenty-six languages. Because of this interest, Offer and his colleagues undertook a cross cultural study of the self-image of adolescents in ten countries. The major finding was that adolescents growing up in very different countries are, on the whole, more similar to one another than they are different. However, there were some important differences in their psychological makeup. The bank of OSIQ data generated by 30,000 adolescents, both normal and psychiatrically disturbed or delinquent, as well as all the data from the Offer Longitudinal Study has been placed in the Daniel Offer and Marjorie Kaiz Offer Archives at the Institute for Juvenile Research, Department of Psychiatry, University of Illinois Medical School, Chicago Illinois.

==== Deviant and disturbed adolescents ====
Offer undertook a five year study, 1969–1974, of psychiatrically disturbed juvenile delinquents. This was an empirical study to analyze the makeup of this population and how society can best help them. The authors were in charge of an inpatient unit for this population at the Illinois State Psychiatric Institute, a setting which allowed for an in depth study.

In the early 1990s Holinger, Offer and colleagues examined the rates of suicide and homicide among adolescents in order to determine the causes and suggest means of prevention.

==== The Journal of Youth and Adolescence ====
In 1972 Offer founded The Journal of Youth and Adolescence. He served it as editor-in-chief from 1972 to 2006, at which time he became Editor Emeritus.

=== The study of normality ===
During the beginning of the Offer Longitudinal Study, Offer became interested in how mental health professionals defined normality. Working with Melvin Sabshin, they defined the four perspectives of what constitutes normal behavior. They are: normality as health, as utopia, as average and as process. To broaden knowledge of what constitutes normal behavior, Offer and Sabshin with colleagues looked at normality throughout life as well as normality in different settings.

=== The study of leadership ===
In the 1980s Offer pursued his interest in the psychological aspects of leadership by editing a book with Charles B. Strozier. Together they organized a collection of essays, addressing the protean nature of political leadership, tracing the history of the psychological study of leadership from ancient formulations in the Bible to the most recent and progressive psychoanalytic works. A second revised edition was published in 2011.

== Awards and honors ==
Offer was recognized at a Symposium in his honor given by the Department of Psychiatry, University of Illinois Medical School, Chicago, Illinois. A Festschrift in his honor was published in the Journal of Youth and Adolescence, Part I: Vol. 36, No. 1:January 2007, and Part II, Vol. 37, No. 10, November, 2008. He was a Fellow of the Center for Advanced Study in the Behavioral Sciences, Stanford University, Palo Alto California, 1973–1974.

Offer has been recognized by many medical and scientific organizations. Among the honors he has received are the John P. Hill Memorial Award from the Society for Research in Adolescence, 1990; the Adel Hofmann Award from the American Academy of Pediatrics, 1989; the David Dorosin Memorial Lecture of the American College Health Association, 1985; the William A. Schonfeld Memorial Lecture of the American Society for Adolescent Psychiatry, 1985; the J. Rosewell Gallagher Lecture of the Society for Adolescent Medicine, 1979; the Gift of Life Award from the National Kidney Foundation of Illinois, 2003 and the inclusion in the 2014 volume of Developmental Science of Adolescence which contains the autobiographic perspectives of 56 distinguished contributors to the field of adolescence in the 20th century.
