= Thomas J. W. Burgess =

Canadian psychiatrist (1849–1926)

Thomas J. W. Burgess FRSC FAAAS
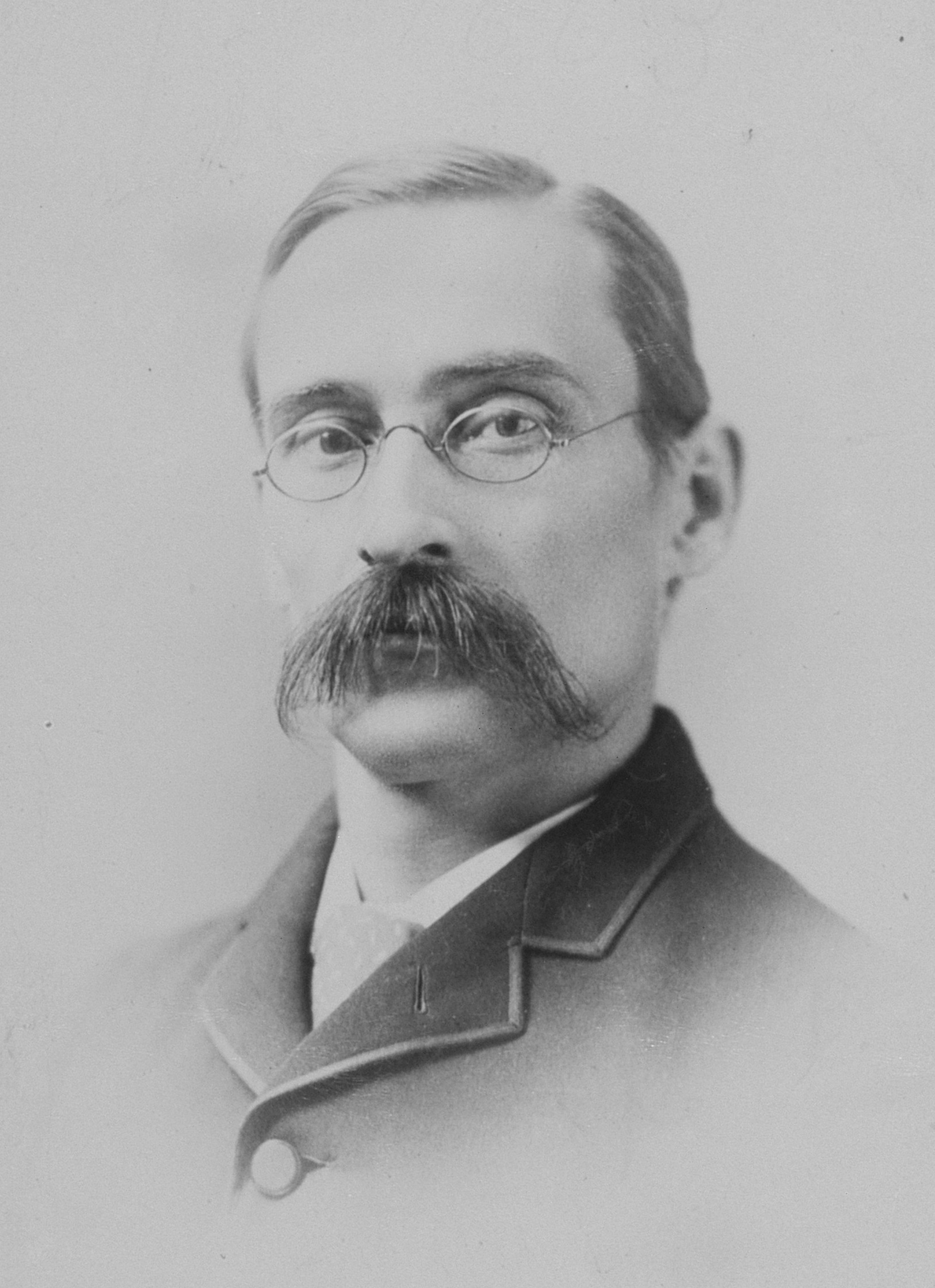
- Burgess in 1891
- Born: 11 March 1849; Ontario, Canada West
- Died: 18 January 1926 (aged 76); Montreal, Quebec, Canada
- Occupations: physician, botanist, superintendent, author
- Spouse: Jessie MacPherson (m. 1875)
- Children: 5

Academic background
- Education: University of Toronto

Thomas Joseph Workman Burgess FRSC (11 March 1849 – 18 January 1926) was a Canadian physician, botanist, and author. He served as the president of the American Psychiatric Association from 1904 to 1905. Burgess made important contributions to the formalization of psychiatry at the turn of the 20th century.

== Biography ==
=== Early life and family ===
Thomas Joseph Workman Burgess was born in 11 March 1849 in Ontario in what was then Canada West. His parents were dry goods merchant Thomas Burgess and Jane Rigg Burgess, both of whom were natives of Carlisle in Cumberland. He was educated in Upper Canada College in Toronto and obtained a scholarship and numerous prizes there. He then was matriculated with an M.D. in the University of Toronto. He graduated in 1870.

In 1875, he married Jessie MacPherson and had five daughters together.

=== Career ===
Following his graduation, he spent a year working as a clinical assistant in the Toronto Lunatic Asylum (now the Centre for Addiction and Mental Health) under his godfather Joseph Workman for about a year.

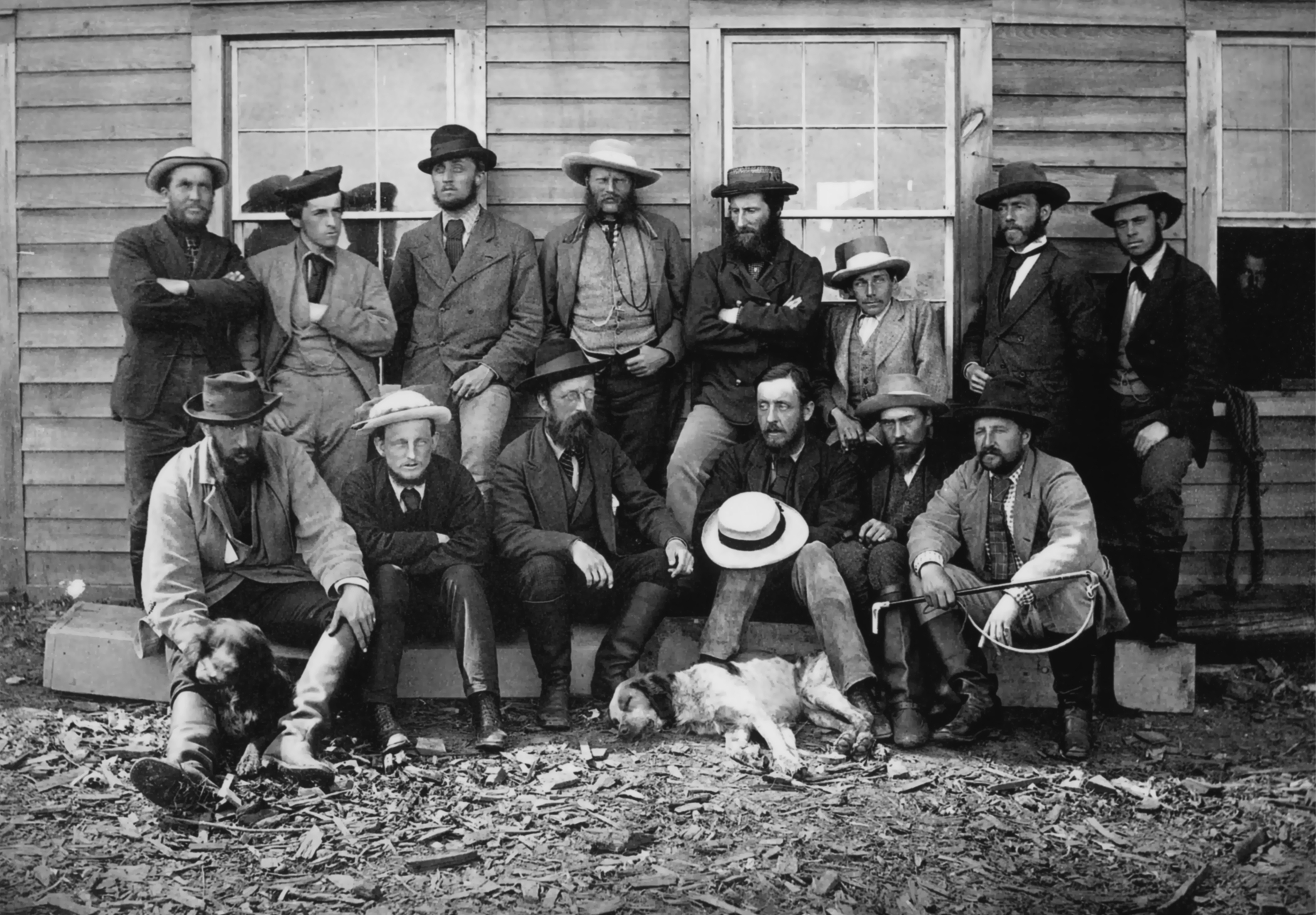
Photograph of the Commission, c. 1875. Burgess can be seen in the front row, center-left

In 1872, he was attached to the Royal Engineers and appointed as the surgeon for Her Majesty's British North American Boundary Commission. He was thanked by the Her Majesty's Government for his work in the commission. After returning to Toronto, he became assistant physician and later assistant superintendent at the Asylum For The Insane in London, Ontario, under Henry Landor and Richard Maurice Bucke from 1875 to 1887. He was an honorary secretary of the Second Pan-American Medical Congress held in 1896 at Mexico City.

Following a dispute with Bucke, he was transferred as assistant superintendent of the Hamilton Insane Asylum. In 1900, governors of the newly erected Protestant Hospital for the Insane (now the Douglas Mental Health University Institute) at Verdun in Montreal unanimously elected him as the first medical superintendent of the institution for 33 years. He was also elected president of the American Medico-Psychological Association (now the American Psychiatric Association) from 1904 to 1905.

He was assigned as a lecturer at McGill University in 1893, later becoming a professor of Mental Diseases there. He became a Fellow of the Royal Society of Canada in 1885 and a Fellow of the American Association for the Advancement of Science in 1886, serving as president of the former's Biological section in 1898.

He was a member of the Royal Canadian Institute in Toronto, an honorary member of the Hamilton Association, Vice President of the latter from 1888 to 1890, and a member of the Torrey Botanical Society.

=== Later life and death ===
Burgess died in 18 January 1926 in Montreal and was buried in Toronto two days later.

== Contributions ==
=== Contributions to psychiatry ===
Burgess helped transformed the Verdun Protestant Hospital for the Insane into one of the best and highly regarded institutions in North America. He contributed to Québécois physicians being drawn out of their isolation and encouraged to seek broader platforms.

Burgess tried to treat patients in the Verdun asylum in the most sympathetic way possible. He treated psychiatric patients with medication as well as their mental health and was against all forms of physical restraint on patients, instead treating them with extensive programs. He also encouraged the admission of private patients and was in favour for trial releases of patients whose mental health had improved. Because of the financial benefits the Verdun asylum received from wealthy families, Burgess was able to implement these reforms with a better chance of success.

=== Contributions to botany ===
During his time at Her Majesty's British North American Boundary Commission, he took interest in botany, a subject he devoted many letters and articles to. He developed a reputation due to his publications and contributed at the Botanical Gazette (now the International Journal of Plant Sciences). He also helped John Macoun with the fifth volume of the Catalogue of Canadian Plants, where he wrote the portion on ferns.

== Publications ==
- 1875: Report on the Geology and Resources of the Region in the Vicinity of the Forty-ninth Parallel, from the Lake of the Woods to the Rocky Mountains, with Dawson
- 1881: On the Beneficent and Toxical Effects of Various Species of Rhus
- 1884: A Botanical Holiday in Nova Scotia
- 1888: How to Study Botany
- 1889: The Lake Erie shore as a Botanizing Ground
- 1889: Art in the Sick Room
- 1890: Notes on the History of Botany
- 1892: Notes on the Genus Rhus
- 1896: Thyroid Feeding and its Application to the Treatment of Insanity
- 1898: A Historical Sketch of our Canadian Institutions for the Insane
- 1899: Two Cases of Ephemeral Mania, Uncomplicated with Epilepsy, Intemperance or Parturition
- 1916: The Institutional Care of the Insane in the United States and Canada, with Hurd et al.
