= Wellwood Cemetery =

Jewish cemetery in Suffolk County, New York

Coordinates: 40°44′22″N 73°23′12″W

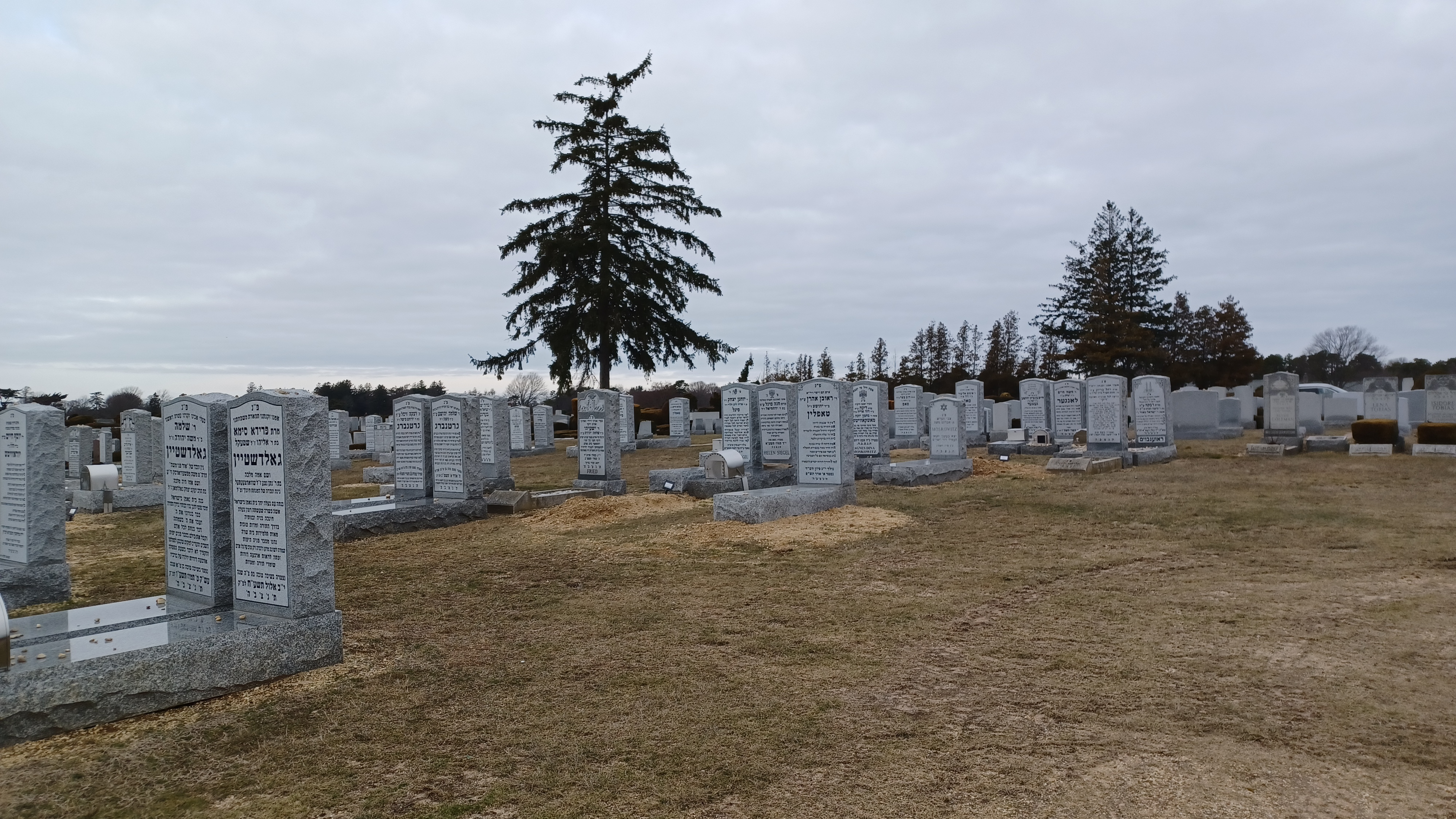
- tombstones with Hebrew inscriptions on Wellwood Cemetery
- Interactive map of Wellwood Cemetery

Details
- Location: West Babylon, New York
- Type: Jewish cemetery

Wellwood Cemetery is a Jewish cemetery in West Babylon, New York. It was established as the annex to Beth David Cemetery in Elmont, New York. This cemetery comprises many sections, each under the auspices of a synagogue, landsmanschaft, or group such as the Brooklyn Jewish Postal Workers Union. Its interments include both caskets and urns. Each of these is marked, most commonly by a stone arch or a pair of stone columns. Many of the landsmanshaft have dedicated Holocaust monuments to the victims of the Nazis in their ancestral town. Examples include Baranovichi, Belarus; Ioannina, Greece; Pilica, Poland; Sokołów Podlaski, Poland; and Burshtyn, Ukraine.

Several well-known rabbis are buried here. Kehillas Belz of New York has a section within the Beth Moses section of Wellwood Cemetery. The Belz Kehilla still dedicated (Mekudash) this section when the previous Belz Rebbe Reb Aharon was still alive.

== Notable burials ==
- Maury Allen – sportswriter, actor, and columnist
- Jules Bass - television producer, director, author and lyricist
- Shulamith Firestone - Radical Feminist, artist, author of The Dialectic of Sex and Airless Spaces
- Craig Gilbert – film writer, producer, and director
- Danny Leiner – film director
- Lucy Ozarin – one of the first women psychiatrists commissioned in the US Navy and one of seven women Navy psychiatrists who served during World War II
- Leo F. Rayfiel – former United States House of Representatives and United States District Court judge
- Julius and Ethel Rosenberg – convicted of conspiracy to commit espionage and executed
- Murray Seeman - lawyer, real estate developer, World War II 6th Port Headquarters officer
- Lester Wolff – Former member of the United States House of Representatives
