= Heinrich Finkelstein =

German Jewish pediatrician and a pioneer in pediatric nutrition

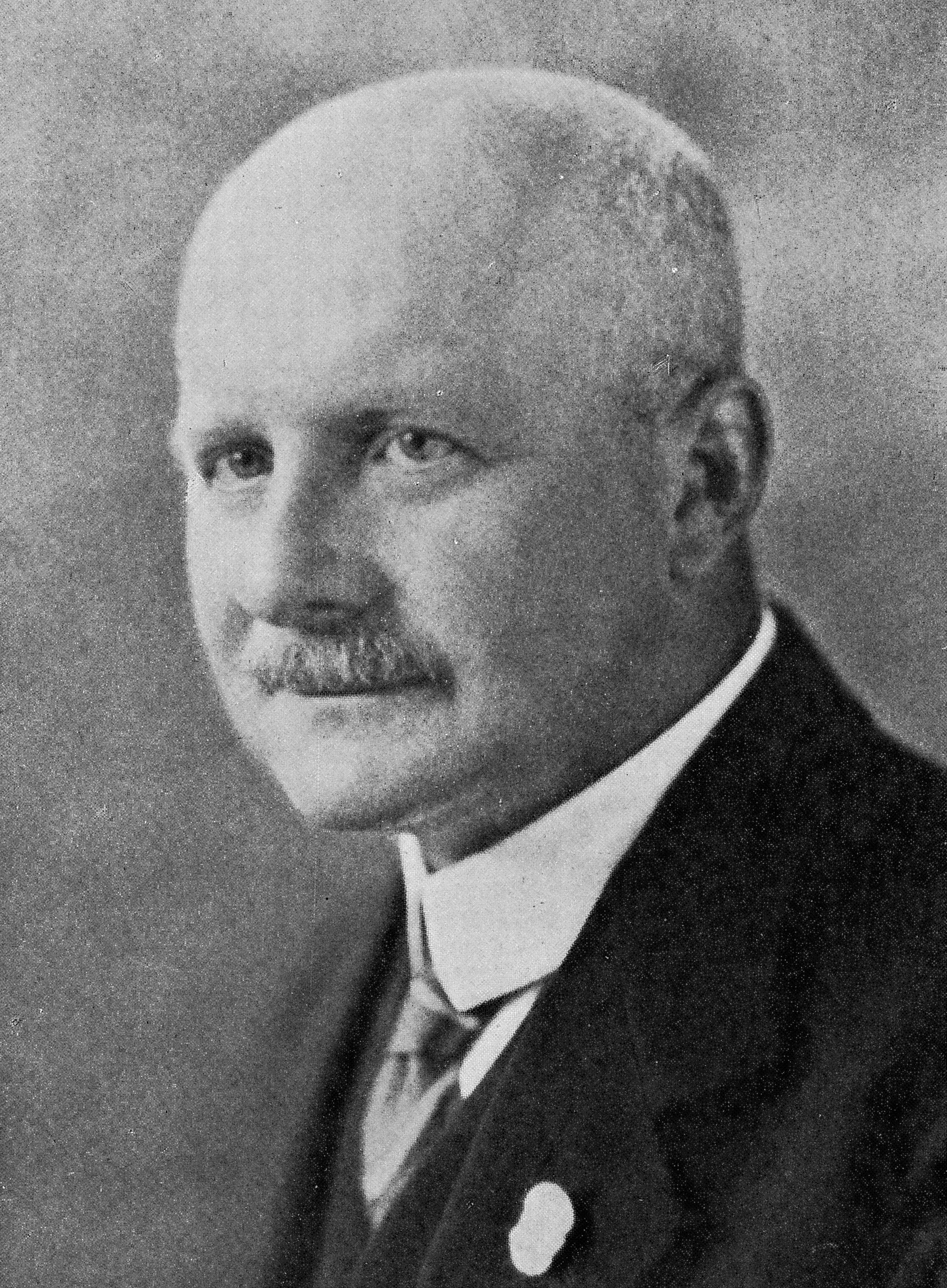
Heinrich Finkelstein

Heinrich Finkelstein (31 July 1865 in Leipzig, Germany – 28 January 1942 in Santiago, Chile) was a German Jewish pediatrician and a pioneer in pediatric nutrition.

== Life ==
Finkelstein's father was a businessman and the head of the local Jewish community in Leipzig. Heinrich first studied first natural sciences in Munich and Leipzig, and was eventually awarded a Ph.D. in geology. Only then did he began the study of medicine, graduating in 1893.

== Career ==
Finkelstein chose to specialize in pediatrics under Prof. Otto Heubner, following him from Leipzig to Berlin, where Heubner had been appointed as the first professor of Pediatrics at the Charité. From 1901 to 1918 Finkelstein was the assistant medical director of the Berlin Asylum Kürassierstraße for Children and the Municipal Orphanage, where he combined medical skills with social commitment.

In 1910 Finkelstein, together with Langstein, von Pfaundler, von Pirquet, and Salge, founded the Zeitschrift für Kinderheilkunde.

In 1918, after the death of Adolf Aron Baginsky, he was appointed Medical Director of the Emperor and Empress Frederick Children's Hospital in Berlin. His scientific work was mainly on eating disorders, skin diseases and birth-related damage to the newborn.

As medical director of the Emperor and Empress Frederick Children's Hospital, Finkelstein reduced the infant mortality rate to 4.3%, a value not to be exceeded in Germany until many decades later. His idea of a comprehensive public infant care was ahead of time, some of which was not realized until decades later. In 1905 he called for the extension of statutory care for working pregnant women and new mothers, the introduction of an appropriate rest period before and after delivery, the free distribution of a "perfect" baby milk to the poor, and the establishment of infant homes. Together with Ludwig Ferdinand Meyer, he developed the first artificial milk protein milk, thus saving the life of thousands of infants who suffered from eating disorders. Although respected and honored internationally as a pediatrician, being a Jew, he never received an Ordinary professorship and was only a lecturer at the Berlin University.

On 1 March 1933, shortly before the Nazis gained power, he retired. However, in 1935, he lost his teaching position and license to practice medicine. In 1936 he was invited as visiting professor to Chicago but soon returned to Berlin to be near his sister, his only family (he never married).

The November pogrom of 1938 led him to leave Germany for good. Finkelstein immigrated to Chile, but he was too old and too sick to start again from scratch. Salvador Allende, who later became Chile's president, was then the health minister, and gave him an honorary pension, which was withdrawn shortly after the fall of the government. Colleagues from the University of Santiago procured him a pro forma appointment as doorman to the hospital, which secured him his daily bread. Nevertheless, in difficult cases, he was still called in as a consultant.

Finkelstein wrote a book on infant diseases (Lehrbuch der Säuglingskrankheiten) that was printed both in German and Spanish, in which he summarized his experience and his vision of holistic medicine. This work became a standard reference textbook for generations of pediatricians in Europe and Latin America, well into the postwar period.

On 28 January 1942 Heinrich Finkelstein died in Santiago, Chile.

== Works ==
- Heinrich Finkelstein: Der Laubenstein bei Hohen-Aschau. Ein Beitrag zur Kenntnis der Brachiopodenfacies des unteren alpinen Doggers. Dissertation, München 1888. (Auch in: Neues Jahrbuch für Mineralogie. Beilageband VI)
- Heinrich Finkelstein: Die durch Geburtstraumen hervorgerufenen Krankheiten des Säuglings. Fischers Medizinische Buchhandlung, Berlin 1902 (Berliner Klinik, Heft 168)
- Heinrich Finkelstein: Lehrbuch der Säuglingskrankheiten. Privatdruck, Fischers Medizinische Buchhandlung, Berlin 1903–1912
- Louis Ballin, Heinrich Finkelstein: Die Waisensäuglinge Berlins und ihre Verpflegung im Städtischen Kinderasyl. Ein Beitrag zu Fragen der Anstaltsbehandlung von Säuglingen. Urban & Schwarzenberg, Berlin, Wien 1904
- Heinrich Finkelstein: Lehrbuch der Säuglingskrankheiten. Verlag H. Kornfeld, Berlin 1905–1912
- Heinrich Finkelstein, Ludwig F. Meyer: Über Eiweißmilch. Ein Beitrag zum Problem der künstlichen Ernährung. Karger, Berlin 1910 in Jahrbuch für Kinderheilkunde. Bd. 71, der dritten Folge 21. Bd.)
- Heinrich Finkelstein; Eugen Emanuel Galewsky; Ludwig Halberstaedter (Hrsg.): Hautkrankheiten und Syphilis im Säuglings- und Kindesalter. Ein Atlas. J. Springer, Berlin, 1922
- Heinrich Finkelstein; Ferdinand Rohr: Die Behandlung der tuberkulösen Bauchfellerkrankungen im Kindesalter. Halle a. S. 1922–1923 (Sammlung zwangloser Abhandlungen aus dem Gebiete der Verdauungs- und Stoffwechselkrankheiten. Band 8,1)
- Heinrich Finkelstein: Lehrbuch der Säuglingskrankheiten. 3., vollständig umgearbeitete Auflage, Julius Springer, Berlin 1924
- Heinrich Finkelstein: Der gesunde Säugling. Safari Verlag, Berlin o.J. [um 1930]
- Heinrich Finkelstein: Säuglingskrankheiten. Elsevier, Amsterdam 1938
- Heinrich Finkelstein: Tratado de las enfermedades del lactante. Ed. Labor, Barcelona; Madrid; Buenos Aires; Rio de Janeiro 1941

== Sources ==
- Wunderlich P.: Heinrich Finkelstein (1865–1942)--pediatrician and pioneer in social pediatrics. A biographical sketch]. Kinderarztl Prax. 1990 Nov;58(11):587-92.Article in German
- Robert J. Karp, MD; Sabine Chlosta, MD: Failure to Thrive: Recalling Milton Levine and Heinrich Finkelstein Pediatric Annals November 2008
- I. A. A.: HEINRICH FINKELSTEIN, M.D. 1865–1942 Obituaries | March 1942 Am J Dis Child. 1942;63(3):582.
- Biography at the website of the Charite Hospital
