= Melvin Sabshin =

American psychiatrist

Melvin Sabshin, M.D. (1925– 4 June 2011) was an American psychiatrist, the medical director of the American Psychiatric Association from 1974 to 1997, and a leader in psychiatry placing it firmly within the discipline of medicine. He worked quietly within many groups and organizations to attain the changes he believed necessary to advance the profession of psychiatry.

== Biography ==
Sabshin was born in New York City, the son of Jewish immigrant parents from Russia. His father attained an M.D. degree in 1913 and opened his medical practice in New York. At the age of 50, he developed hypertension and moved the family to Miami Beach, Florida. Sabshin attended public schools in New York and completed high school at the age of 14. He entered the University of Florida in 1944 and graduated with a B.S. degree and a Phi Beta Kappa key. World War II was under way, he postponed going to medical school and joined the U.S. Army. He served for one year as a corpsman at a military hospital in New Orleans, Louisiana where he became acquainted with medicine.

Sabshin entered Tulane University School of Medical in New Orleans, completed the program in three and one-half years, and was, academically, among the first in his class. By graduation, he had decided to go into psychiatry as he was influenced by Robert Galbraith Heath, M.D., the head of psychiatry and neurology at Tulane and studied the biochemistry of schizophrenia. Sabshin took his internship at Charity Hospital in New Orleans from 1948 to 1949 and remained there for his residency in psychiatry. During his residency, he began training in psychoanalysis. He later completed his training in Chicago at the Institute for Psychosomatic & Psychiatric Research and Training at the Michael Reese Hospital Medical Center where he held a research position from 1954 to 1955. He trained under Roy R. Grinker Sr., M.D., an established leader in psychiatry who sought an integrated understanding of complex behaviors. He remained at Michael Reese Hospital Medical Center until 1961 when he became the associate director of the Institute for Psychosomatic & Psychiatric Research and Training. He became interested in several ideologies which were a part of psychiatry. His interests led to his belief that ideologies had to be replaced with rational, evidence-based approaches to the prevention and treatment of mental illness. Additionally, social and community psychiatry were among his interests.

In 1961, Sabshin left the Institute for Psychosomatic & Psychiatric Research and Training to become chair of Psychiatry at the University of Illinois in Chicago. From 1967 to 1968, he was a Fellow at the Center for Advanced Study in the Behavioral Sciences at Stanford University in Palo Alto, California. Returning to Chicago, he served as the Acting Dean of the University of Illinois College of Medicine. In 1974, he left Illinois to become the medical director of the American Psychiatric Association where he remained for 23 years. He became a major influence in the growth and development of psychiatry as an evidenced-based medical discipline through the integration of multiple systems.

His appointment as medical director set the stage for the gradual transformation of the profession. Working with the National Institute of Mental Health, he initially focused on training and research. American Psychiatric Publishing, Inc. (APPI), a publishing company, was established and Sabshin served as its first president. Over time, APPI became the largest publisher of monographs for the field of psychiatry. The American Psychiatric Association developed a new nosology based on research in psychiatry, which led to the publication of the Diagnostic and Statistical Manual (DSM). These developments led to the introduction of Practice Guideline Manuals which became especially important with the widespread use of pharmacotherapy.

Sabshin was actively involved in numerous psychiatric and other organizations: the Illinois Psychiatric Association (president, 1961–1962), the American College of Psychiatry (president, 1973–1974), the World Federation for Mental Health, and the World Psychiatric Association where he served as a member of its executive committee. He was particularly concerned with the abuse of psychiatry and the incarceration of dissident psychiatrists in the Soviet Union.

His biography lists over 100 publications including books and chapters in books. His first publication in 1954 as a co-author was on the subject of the glucose tolerance test in schizophrenia in the Journal of Nervous and Mental Disease. In 1966, with his colleague, Daniel Offer, M.D., he published Normality, a long term study of normal adolescents. After his retirement, APPI published his book Changing American Psychiatry: A Personal Perspective.

Sabshin died in London in 2011.

== Works ==
- Offer, Daniel, and Melvin Sabshin. Normality: Theoretical and Clinical Concepts of Mental Health. New York: Basic Books, 1966.
- Offer, Daniel, and Melvin Sabshin, eds. Normality and the Life Cycle: A Critical Integration. New York: Basic Books, 1984.
- Offer, Daniel, and Melvin Sabshin, eds. The Diversity of Normal Behavior: Further Contributions to Normatology. New York: Basic Books, 1991.
- Weissman, Sidney H., Melvin Sabshin, and Harold Eist, eds. Psychiatry in the New Millennium. Washington, DC: American Psychiatric Press, 1999.
- Sabshin, Melvin. Changing American Psychiatry: A Personal Perspective. Washington, DC: American Psychiatric Publ., 2008.
