= Leo H. Bartemeier =

American physician (1895–1982)

Leo Henry Bartemeier (September 12, 1895 – October 9, 1982) was an American physician, psychoanalyst, and educator. He was President of the American Psychiatric Association.

== Biography ==
Bartemeier was born on September 12, 1895, in Muscatine, Iowa, into a Roman Catholic family. He attended the local parochial school and then enrolled in St. Mary's College (Kansas), a Jesuit center, and completed two years of college. He learned shorthand and typing when working for the Associated Press. He transferred and completed college at The Catholic University of America in Washington, DC, earning a Bachelor of Arts and Master of Arts degrees, following acceptance of his thesis on animal research. He entered Georgetown Medical College and earned his MD in 1920. His first medical residency was at the Henry Ford Hospital in Detroit and then, in 1924, he began his second residency in psychiatry in Baltimore, Maryland, under Adolf Meyer (psychiatrist). During this period, he published his first paper, "Decerebrate Rigidity of the Sloth", in 1926.

He returned to Detroit in 1926 to begin his private psychiatric practice. In 1930, he began psychoanalytic training in Chicago, and in 1938, he became a training analyst. He was the first psychoanalyst in Detroit and helped to found the Detroit Psychoanalytic Society in 1940. He was president of the Society from 1940 to 1946. In 1945, during World War II, he was Chairman of a Commission to study combat exhaustion in Europe, and served as a consultant to the U.S. Army Surgeon General. After 1944, he was an associate professor at Wayne State University Medical School (1946-1950), director of the Veterans Psychiatric Clinic at the Harper Hospital (1946-1950), and the first visiting professor of psychiatry at the University of Michigan (1950-1954). In 1954, Bartemeier moved to Baltimore to head Seton Hospital, a private mental hospital, where he practiced until 1980.

Bartemeier's professional life was filled with teaching and professional activities. He actively worked with the American Psychoanalytic Association (president, 1944–1945); director of the professional staff at the Haven Sanitarium (1942-1954); and director of professional education at the Pontiac State Hospital (1949-1954). In 1952, when the American Medical Association established a Council on Mental Health, he was its first chairman. He was Chairman of the Joint Commission of Mental Health in the 1950s. The U.S. Congress authorized the Joint Commission to make recommendations to improve mental health programs. The commission's recommendations resulted in legislation. He was secretary and president of the American Psychiatric Association (1951-1952). He was president of the Group for Psychiatry; a founder and president of the Detroit Psychoanalytic Institute; president of the American Psychoanalytic Society; and president of the International Psychoanalytic Association, an office he accepted after consultation with Pope Pius XII. At the request of the World Health Organization (WHO), he traveled to Ireland to consult on mental health programs for children which led to the establishment of the first child guidance clinic in Ireland. He helped found the Cornelian Corner to promote child-mother interactions. His consultant and committee appointments included the National Institute of Mental Health and the Veterans Administration Advisory Committee.

Bartemeier received honors during his career including a Doctor of Science degree from Georgetown University and the John Carrick Medal of Honor. The American College of Psychiatry awarded him the Bowie Prize. He received one of the highest award from the Catholic Church: a Knighthood in the Equestrian Order of Saint Gregory the Great.

He died in Grosse Pointe, Michigan on October 9, 1982.

== Works ==
- Richter, Curt P., and Bartemeier, Leo H. "Decerebrate Rigidity of the Sloth", Brain, 49(2) (1926): 207–225.
- Bartemeier, Leo H., and L. S. Kubie. "Combat Exhaustion", Journal of Nervous and Mental Disease 104(4) (July/December 1946): 358–389; and 104(5) (November 1946): 489–525.
- Bartemeier, Leo H. "The Attitude of the Physician", JAMA 145(15) (April 14, 1951): 1122–1125.
- Bartemeier, Leo H. "Presidential Address", The American Journal of Psychiatry 109(1) (1952): xiii-7.
- Bartemeier, Leo H. "American Medicine and the Development of Psychiatry", JAMA 163(2) (1957): 95–97.
