= Charles Macfie Campbell =

American psychiatrist (1876–1943)

- Born: 8 September 1876; Scotland
- Died: 7 August 1943. Cambridge, Massachusetts, U.S.
- Education: M.B. and a Ch.B.
- Occupation: psychiatrist
- Years active: 1903–1943
- Medical career
- Profession: psychiatrist, Professor
- Field: psychiatry
- Institutions: Manhattan State Hospital; Royal Edinburgh Asylum; New York Psychiatric Institute; Johns Hopkins University; Boston Psychopathic Hospital; Harvard Medical School
- Notable works: on general paralysis of the insane (later known as neurosyphilis)

Charles Macfie Campbell (September 8, 1876, in Edinburgh – August 7, 1943) was a psychiatrist in the United States. He was President of the American Psychiatric Association.

== Early life ==
Campbell was born in Scotland in 1876. He received his medical degree from Edinburgh in 1902, earning both an M.B. and a Ch.B., after which he sought postgraduate training in France and then Germany, where he trained in Heidelberg under German psychiatrist Emil Kraepelin (1856–1926).

== Career ==
He returned to Scotland in 1903 and served under the psychiatrist Alexander Bruce at the Royal Edinburgh Infirmary. In 1904 he was invited by Adolf Meyer (1866–1950)to join the staff of the Pathological Institute of the New York State Hospitals, which was based at the Manhattan State Hospital on Wards Island in New York City.

Macfie Campbell spent 1907 back in Scotland as an assistant physician at the Royal Edinburgh Asylum but returned to New York to work again under Meyer at the (renamed) New York Psychiatric Institute in 1908. During the next few years Macfie Campbell would not only adopt Meyer's "dynamic" psychogenic perspective on mental disorders but would also be instrumental in introducing Freudian psychoanalytic ideas into American psychiatry with like-minded colleagues at the Manhattan State Hospital.

When Meyer left the Institute in 1910 for a professorship at Johns Hopkins University and to plan for the new Henry C. Phipps Psychiatric Clinic (opened in April 1913), Macfie Campbell also left to work at the Bloomingdale Hospital in White Plains, New York. In 1911 he earned his Doctor of Medicine degree from Edinburgh after completing a dissertation on general paralysis of the insane (later known as neurosyphilis).

In 1913 he rejoined Adolf Meyer in Baltimore to serve as associate director of the newly opened Phipps clinic. He was also appointed a faculty position as assistant professor of psychiatry at Johns Hopkins Medical School. In 1920 he moved to Massachusetts to become the new director of the Boston Psychopathic Hospital and to assume the position of chair of the department of psychiatry at Harvard Medical School, where he remained until his death.

He died in Cambridge, Massachusetts on 7 August 1943.
