= Robert Galbraith Heath =

American psychiatrist (1915–1999)

Robert Galbraith Heath (May 9, 1915 – September 21, 1999) was an American psychiatrist. He followed the theory of biological psychiatry, which holds that organic defects are the sole source of mental illness, and that consequently mental problems are treatable by physical means. He published 425 papers and three books. One of his first papers is dated 1946. He was profiled as a "famous American psychiatrist" in 1983 by Psychiatric Annals.

Heath founded the Department of Psychiatry and Neurology at Tulane University, New Orleans, in 1949 and remained its chairman until 1980. He performed many experiments there involving electrical stimulation of the brain via surgically implanted electrodes. He placed deep brain stimulation (DBS) electrodes into the brains of more than 54 patients. He has been cited as the first, or one of the first, researcher(s) to have placed electrodes deep into the brains of living human patients. It has been suggested that this work was financed in part by the government, particularly the CIA or U.S. military.

In 1972, he attempted using DBS to change a homosexual man to heterosexuality, which caused temporary arousal, but did not lead to long term change in attractions. Heath also experimented with psychosurgery, the drug bulbocapnine to induce stupor, and LSD, using African-American prisoners in the Louisiana State Penitentiary as experimental subjects. He worked on schizophrenia patients, which he regarded as an illness with a physical basis. Today Heath's work is considered highly controversial and is only rarely used as reference material.

== Personal life ==
Heath was born on May 9, 1915, in Pittsburgh, Pennsylvania. He was encouraged by his father, who was a general medical practitioner, to enter the medical field as well. He received medical and undergraduate education from the University of Pittsburgh, where he graduated in 1938. He became determined to find his career in neurology after his father died. He then trained in neurology at the Neurological Institute of New York, and became a fellow at Pennsylvania Hospital. During World War II, he was drafted into the U.S. Navy to work as a psychiatrist. After returning from the war, he studied at the College of Physicians and Surgeons, at Columbia University. Heath married and had five children. He died on September 21, 1999, in St. Petersburg, Florida, at the age of 84.

== Schizophrenia studies ==
Heath began electrical brain stimulation experiments on schizophrenia patients in 1950. In 1954, Heath published a monograph called "Studies in Schizophrenia" detailing his deep brain stimulation experiments on 25 schizophrenic patients. The study's methodology was met with much criticism at the time. Some of the patients experienced seizures or fatal brain abscess. In 1956, he published findings claiming the ability to induce symptoms of schizophrenia by injecting the blood of schizophrenia patients into the bodies of healthy patients. In particular, he claimed to have isolated a protein (taraxein) that could induce this effect. His findings produced widespread attention, both within the scientific community and the general public. The scientific community tended towards skepticism of his claims, and attempts to replicate his findings ensued. However, these attempts to confirm his findings mostly failed. Psychiatry textbooks in the 1960s lent some credence to his claims, though this ceased to be the case by the 1970s and 1980s. Heath continued to defend his findings and theory of schizophrenia until at least 1996.

== Gay conversion experiment ==
Heath was experimenting in 1953 on inducing paroxysms through brain stimulation. During the course of his experiments in deep brain stimulation, Heath experimented with DBS as a means of facilitating arousal, claiming to have converted a homosexual patient to heterosexuality, labeled in his 1972 paper as Patient B-19. While the electrodes were attached they temporarily facilitated arousal to a female prostitute, but they did not change the patient's long term sexual interests. At the time, homosexuality was considered a psychiatric disorder under the DSM-II.

The patient, who had been arrested for marijuana possession, was implanted with electrodes into the septal region (associated with feelings of pleasure), and many other parts of his brain. The septal electrodes were then stimulated while he was shown heterosexual pornographic material. The patient was later encouraged to have intercourse with a sex worker recruited for the study. However, while the electrodes produced arousal temporarily, they did not change the patient's sexual attraction or nature.

This research would be deemed unethical today for a variety of reasons. The patient was recruited for the study while under legal duress, and further implications for the patient's well-being, including indications that electrode stimulation was addictive, were not considered. In 1973, his ethical conduct during these studies was questioned by a subcommittee of the U.S. Senate. Heath's experiment was also criticized by Fred Mettler, who was previously his mentor.

One of Heath's colleagues, John Goethe, disputes the framing of the use of DBS in this case. According to Goethe, "At least at the time I knew [B-19], it was less about whether he was homosexual or heterosexual. He was sort of asexual. He just wasn't that interested". Goethe argues B-19 approached Heath for help with his sexuality, rather than having it imposed on him in exchange for leniency over drugs charges, which was suggested by Bill Rushton.

== Cannabis studies ==
Heath conducted a study on two rhesus macaques trained to smoke "the equivalent of one marijuana cigarette a day, five days a week for six months" and concluded that cannabis causes permanent changes in the brain. Nonetheless, he supported cannabis decriminalization. He later conducted a National Institutes of Health-funded study on 13 rhesus monkeys, with one rotating group representing "heavy smokers" whose cannabis dosage was believed to be comparable to three marijuana cigarettes smoked daily, a "moderate" group that was given the equivalent of one joint a day, and a third group that puffed inactive cannabis. He concluded, "Alcohol is a simple drug with a temporary effect. Marijuana is complex with a persisting effect." According to the BBC, "His findings of permanent brain damage have been dismissed by similar, independently conducted studies. But other scientists have argued these methods of animal research are inconclusive." According to NORML, Heath's "work was never replicated and has since been discredited by a pair of better controlled, much larger monkey studies, one by Dr. William Slikker of the National Center for Toxicological Research and the other by Charles Rebert and Gordon Pryor of SRI International."

== Selected publications ==
- "Cerebellar stimulation in treating intractable behavior disorders" Curr Psychiatr Ther. 1981;20:329–36
- "The cerebellar pacemaker for intractable behavioral disorders and epilepsy: follow-up report." Biol Psychiatry. 1980 Apr;15(2):243–56.
- "A surgical technique for chronic electrode implantation in humans." Confin Neurol. 1962;22:223–27.
- "Intracranial self-stimulation in man." Science. 1963 Apr 26;140(3565):394–96.

== See also ==
- José Manuel Rodriguez Delgado
- James Olds
- Wilder Penfield
- Unethical human experimentation in the United States
