= Orpheus Everts =

American physician (1826–1903)

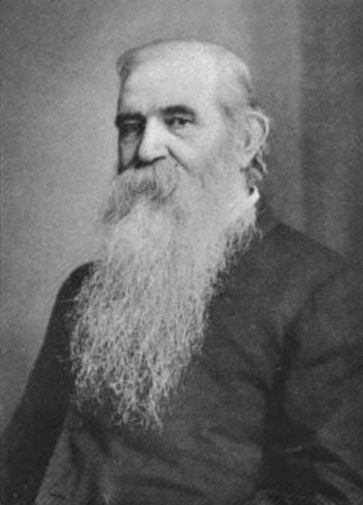
- Orpheus Everts in 1896
- Born: December 18, 1826; Union County, Indiana, U.S.
- Died: June 19, 1903 (aged 76); Cincinnati, Hamilton County, Ohio, U.S.
- Resting place: Crown Hill Cemetery
- Education: Indiana Medical College
- Occupations: Physician, surgeon, researcher, writer, newspaper publisher
- Known for: Psychiatry
- Spouse: Mary Jane Richards
- Children: 5

Orpheus Everts (December 18, 1826 – June 19, 1903) was an American physician, surgeon, psychiatrist, writer and researcher. He served as the American Psychiatric Association president.

== Early life and education ==
Orpheus Everts was born on December 18, 1826, in Union County, Indiana, United States, to parents Elizabeth (née Heywood) and Sylvanus Everts. His father was a descendant of Myles Standish, of the Plymouth Colony.

He attended Franklin Medical School in Illinois. Everts completed his medical degree in 1846 at the Indiana Medical College.

Everts and Mary Jane Richards were married on March 14, 1847. Together they had 5 children.

== Career ==
He entered private practice of medicine in St. Charles, Illinois. After several years, he retired to become a newspaper editor. In 1860, he was admitted to the bar after studying law. He also served as registrar of the U.S. Land Office in Wisconsin.

Everts served as the surgeon for the 20th Indiana Infantry Regiment during the Civil War (1861–1865), and was instrumental in the care of soldiers at the Battle of Gettysburg.

After the Civil War, he devoted his attention to psychiatry and diseases of the nervous system. In 1868, he was appointed superintendent of the Central State Hospital (also known as Indiana Hospital for the Insane) in Indianapolis. He remained there for 11 years. During his time as superintendent of the Central State Hospital, he was the Chair of Nervous and Mental Diseases at the Indiana Medical College. In 1880, he was appointed superintendent of the Cincinnati Sanitarium. He served as the president of the American Psychiatric Association from 1885 to 1886.

Everts served as an expert witness in several landmark legal cases, including the trial of Guiteau, the assassin of President Garfield, in 1881.

Everts wrote on both medical matters and non-medical literary pieces, including a volume of poetry.

Everts died on June 19, 1903, in Cincinnati, Ohio, United States.

== Bibliography ==
He is the author of a number of notable books:

- Everts, M.D., Orpheus (1885). Overwork As Related To Insanity.
- Everts, M.D., Orpheus (October 1886). Common Errors: Theoretical And Practical, Relating To Insanity.
- Everts, M.D., Orpheus (February 27, 1888). Asexualization As A Penalty For Crime And Reformation Of Criminals. College Hill, Ohio: W.B. Carpenter & Co.
- Everts, M.D., Orpheus (September 12, 1889). Treatment Of The Insane As Related To Science And General Conditions of Humanity, Historically Considered.
- Everts, M.D., Orpheus (November 10, 1883). The Despotism Of Words In Relation To Science. The Cincinnati Lancet Press Print.

== See also ==
- American Psychiatric Association
