= Daniel B. Borenstein =

American psychiatrist

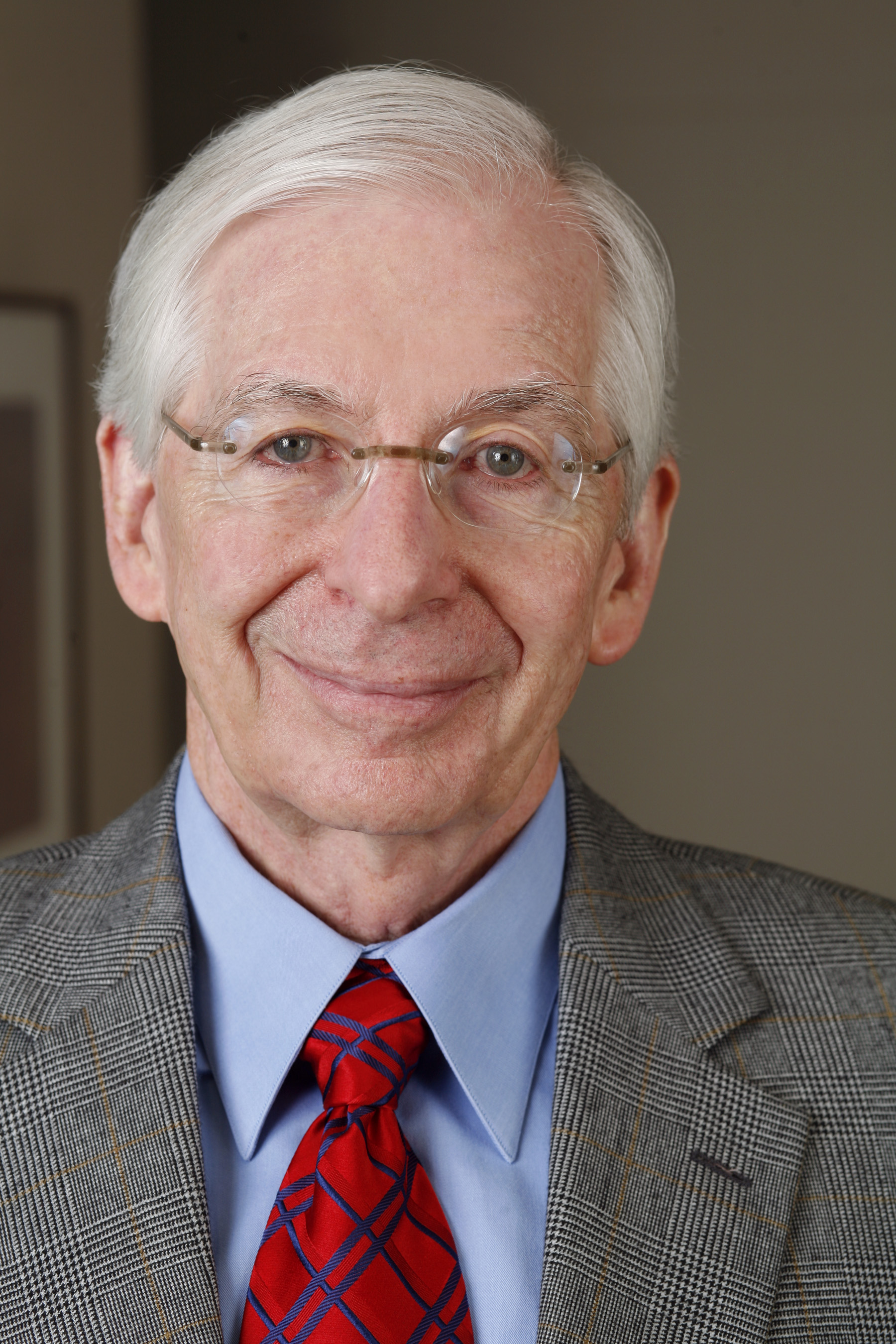
Borenstein in 2007

Daniel B. Borenstein is an American psychiatrist who is the 129th President of the American Psychiatric Association.

== Early life ==
Borenstein was born in Silver City, New Mexico. His parents were Isaac "Jack" and Marjorie E. Borenstein (nee Kerr). Jack owned and managed the Borenstein Brothers Department Store which opened in 1892, and remained in business into the 1960s.

== Education and professional activities ==
Borenstein attended New Mexico Military Institute (1953); Massachusetts Institute of Technology, B.S. (1957); University of Colorado School of Medicine, M.D. (1962); Internal Medicine Internship, University of Kentucky (1963); Psychiatric Residency (1963 to 1966); Chief Residency, Department of Psychiatry, University of Colorado Medical Center (1965 to 1966).

He is a graduate (1971) of the Los Angeles Psychoanalytic Society and Institute. He has been clinical professor at the University of California, Los Angeles Department of Psychiatry and Bio-behavioral Sciences since 1996. From 2000-2001, he was president of the American Psychiatric Association.

On August 1, 2026 Borenstein was scheduled to receive the Lifetime Achievement Award from Los Angeles County Medical Association.

== Research work ==
In the 1980s, prior to assuming the APA presidency, Borenstein wrote academic articles addressing significant mental health issues experienced during medical training.

In 1986, he provided expert testimony in a case by a Holocaust survivor, where a Holocaust denier was accused of "libel and intentional inflicting of emotional distress"; the survivor had been harassed for years by Ditlieb Felderer, a Swedish publisher, who sent the plaintiff material that denied or ridiculed the Holocaust.

In 2000, Borenstein testified before the United States Senate Committee on Commerce, Science, and Transportation about the effects of violence in mass media on children: "We are convinced that repeated exposure to entertainment violence in all its forms has significant public health implications".

== Selected Publications ==
- Borenstein, DB, Cook, K. "Impairment prevention in the training years: a new mental health program at UCLA". Journal of the American Medical Association (JAMA), 247: pages 2700‑2703, 1982.
- Borenstein, DB. "Availability of mental health resources for residents in academic medical centers". Journal of Medical Education, 60: pages 517‑523, 1985.
- Borenstein, DB. "Should physician training centers offer formal psychiatric assistance to house officers? A report on the major findings of a prototype program". The American Journal of Psychiatry, 142: pages 1053‑1057, 1985.
- Borenstein D.B. (1966) Does managed care permit appropriate use of psychotherapy? Psychiatric Services.
