= Jan Fawcett =

American psychiatrist, educator and author (1934–2022)

Dr. Jan A. Fawcett, M.D.
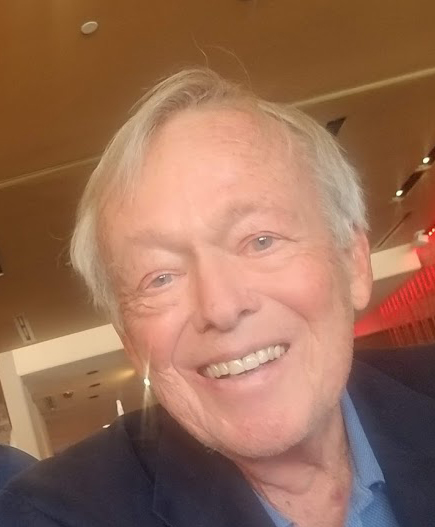
- Fawcett on June 12, 2018 in Santa Fe, NM
- Born: March 31, 1934; Jamestown, New York, U.S.
- Died: May 9, 2022 (aged 88); Santa Fe, New Mexico, U.S.
- Education: University of Rochester (B.S.); Yale University School of Medicine (M.D.0
- Occupations: Psychiatrist, educator, author
- Children: 5
- Writing career
- Language: English

Jan A. Fawcett (March 31, 1934 – May 9, 2022) was an American psychiatrist, educator, and author. His research career focused on the mechanism of action of antidepressant medications and the development of more effective medications for severe depression and treatment modifiable factors leading up to suicide.

== Early life and education ==
Fawcett was born in Jamestown, New York. He was educated at the Hamburg High School in Hamburg, NY. He spent two years at the Naval Academy at Annapolis before earning a bachelor's degree in science at the University of Rochester in 1956. In 1960, he earned his medical degree at Yale Medical School. After a rotating internship year at the U.S. Public Health Service Hospital in San Francisco, CA, he became a resident in psychiatry at the University of California’s Langley Porter Neuropsychiatric Institute. He then graduated from two additional years of residency at the University of Rochester - Strong Memorial Hospital. He then went on for a two year research fellowship at the National Institute of Mental Health at Bethesda, MD.

== Career ==
Fawcett is a professor of psychiatry at the University of New Mexico Medical Center. He was previously the Stanley Harris Jr. Chairman of Psychiatry at the Rush University Medical Center for 30 years.

He received awards for his work, including the Anna Monika Award and the Dr. Jan Fawcett Humanitarian Award. His research career has focused on the mechanism of action of antidepressant medications and the discovery of more effective medications for severe depression as well as treatment modifiable factors leading up to suicide. Fawcett also worked as a mental health consultant for The Oprah Winfrey show.

Fawcett’s opinion has been sought on numerous high profile cases throughout the years. Notably, he interviewed and provided a psychological profile of serial killer John Wayne Gacy after meeting with him in his cell. He also testified against Dr. Jack Kevorkian during his murder trial. Fawcett opined that the individuals with non-fatal illnesses who sought Kevorkian’s services were actually depressed and that treating their depression might’ve alleviated their desires to die. Dr. Fawcett has also provided testimony in innumerable cases of wrongful death or malpractice related to patients who committed suicide.

Fawcett served as the president of the American Foundation for Suicide Prevention. He was also a contributing author for DSM-V and served for 25 years as co-editor of the journal Psychiatric Annals. He was also a member of the scientific board of the Brain and Behavioral Research Foundation.

== Personal life and death ==
Fawcett had five children and four grandchildren. Fawcett and his wife, Katie Busch, lived in Santa Fe, New Mexico.

Fawcett died after a long health struggle in Santa Fe, on May 9, 2022, at the age of 88.

== Publications ==
- Fawcett, Jan (2003). New Hope for People with Bipolar Disorders. Three Rivers Press. ISBN 978-0307353009.
- Fawcett, Jan (2010). DSM-V Perspectives on Classification of Bipolar Disorder. In: Bipolar Disorder: Clinical and Neurobiological Foundations. ISBN 978-0470721988
- Rihmer, Z, Fawcett, J. (2010). Suicide and Bipolar Disorder. In: Bipolar Disorder: Clinical and Neurobiological Foundations. ISBN 978-0470721988
- Fawcett, Jan (2012). Diagnosis, traits, states, and comorbidity in suicide. In: The Neurobiological Basis of Suicide. ISBN 9781439838815
- Fawcett, Jan (2013). Living Forever. iUniverse. ISBN 978-1475984590.
- Fawcett. Jan (2014) Is suicide clinically preventable? What is the evidence? In: Suicide: Phenomenology and Neurobiology. ISBN 978-3319099637
