= Altha Stewart =

American psychiatrist

- Born: South Memphis, Memphis, Tennessee, US

Academic background
- Education: BA, biology, 1973, Christian Brothers University; M.D., Temple University School of Medicine

Academic work
- Institutions: University of Tennessee Health Science Center

Altha Jeanne Stewart is an American psychiatrist. In 2015, Stewart was recruited by the University of Tennessee Health Science Center to establish and direct the Center for Health in Justice Involved Youth. While there, she became the first African American president of the American Psychiatric Association.

== Early life and education ==
Stewart was born and raised in South Memphis, Memphis, Tennessee to a librarian mother and civil service father. Growing up, she attended Carver High School and Sacred Heart High School for Girls. Following high school, she was among the first class of women admitted to Christian Brothers University before earning her medical degree from Temple University School of Medicine and completing her residency in general psychiatry at Temple University School of Medicine. Stewart was later named to the Tennessee Independent Colleges and Universities Association's Hall of Fame by CBU and earned an honorary degree from Regis College. In 2018, Stewart received an honorary Doctor of Science degree from Christian Brothers University.

== Career ==
Following her medical degree, residency, and fellowship, Stewart served as the City of Philadelphia's Department of Public Health's medical director from 1983 to 1991. She was then appointed to the rank of senior deputy commissioner for the New York State Office of Mental Health & Alcoholism Services. From there, Stewart served as the executive director for the Detroit-Wayne Community Mental Health Agency from 1999 to 2002. Upon moving back to Memphis, Stewart managed a federal grant for Shelby County, which focused on children with mental illness and their risk for going into the juvenile justice system. By 2011, she was appointed the executive director of the Just Care Family Network where she became an advocate for youth and families.

Stewart eventually left the public sector and was recruited by the University of Tennessee Health Science Center (UTHSC) to establish and direct the Center for Health in Justice Involved Youth. While serving in this role, she was selected to direct Phase II of Shelby Count's initiative, which was referred to as Defending Childhood Shelby. As a result of her efforts, Stewart received the 2017 James G. Hughes Community Advocate Award from the Memphis Child Advocacy Center and was honored as a Memphis Legend. Beyond UTHSC, Stewart is also active within the American Psychiatric Association (APA) and served on their Board of Trustees, Conflict of Interest Committee and the Minority Fellowship Selection Committee, and Joint Reference Committee and the Council on Advocacy and Government Relations. With her joining the Board of Trustees in the APA, she introduced psychiatric training for residents, along with mental health programs, the management of medication for mental health, and clinical care work to properly train residents by applying their work to real life circumstances. Stewart also contributed to the revision of the Diagnostic and Statistical Manual of Mental Disorders, Fifth Edition, Text Revision (DSM-5-TR), as a member of the Ethnoracial Equity and Inclusion Work Group, which reviewed the manual's treatment of race, ethnicity, and related issues in psychiatric diagnosis. In 2018, Stewart was appointed the first African American to lead the APA as president, for a one-year term. Upon stepping down, she was named the senior associate dean for Community Health Engagement in the University of Tennessee College of Medicine. In 2021, Stewart joined the Jed Foundation Advisory Board to advise on strategies in mental health and suicide prevention. She also joined the University of Tennessee College of Social Work's Board of Visitors. Later that year, Stewart received the Solomon Carter Fuller Award from the APA as a "Black citizen who has pioneered in an area that has significantly improved the quality of life for Black people." In 2022 she was awarded the Pardes Humanitarian Prize, this award provided by the Brain and Behavior Research Foundation. This award is given to people who's work has provided lasting impact.
