= Maria A. Oquendo =

American psychiatrist

Academic background
- Education: BSc, 1980, Tufts University; MD, 1984, Columbia University Vagelos College of Physicians and Surgeons; PhD, 2010, Universidad Autonoma de Madrid

Academic work
- Institutions: Perelman School of Medicine at the University of Pennsylvania; Columbia University

Maria A. Oquendo is an American psychiatrist. Oquendo is the chair of the Department of Psychiatry in the Perelman School of Medicine at the University of Pennsylvania. In 2016, she became the first Latina to be elected president of the American Psychiatric Association.

== Early life and education ==
Oquendo graduated from Tufts University in 1980 and received her medical degree from the Columbia University Vagelos College of Physicians and Surgeons in 1984. She then completed her residency in Psychiatry at the Payne Whitney Psychiatric Clinic in the New York Hospital-Cornell Medical Center.

== Career ==
=== Columbia University ===
Upon completing her formal education, Oquendo joined the faculty at Columbia University and co-established the Oquendo-Gould-Stanley-Posner classification system to identify sub-categories of suicidal behavior. In 2003, Oquendo and her colleagues were commissioned by the Food and Drug Administration to develop a classification system to examine suicide-related events in the data. Oquendo first proposed suicidal behavior should be its own diagnostic category in 2008 and successfully argued its addition to the DSM-5's appendix in 2013.

By 2007, Oquendo was appointed the director of research clinics at Columbia and vice chair for education and training. As a result of her research, Oquendo was awarded the Gerald Klerman Award from the Depression and Bipolar Support Alliance, Simon Bolivar Award, and the National Hispanic Medical Association Hispanic Health Leadership Award. In September 2014, Milton Wainberg and Oquendo launched a fellowship program to promote international training in mental health implementation research in Mozambique. During the same year, she was announced as president-elect of the American Psychiatric Association (APA), and subsequently became their first Latina president in 2016.

=== University of Pennsylvania ===
Oquendo left Columbia in 2017 to become the new chair of the Department of Psychiatry in the Perelman School of Medicine at the University of Pennsylvania. While serving in this role, she was elected a Member of the National Academy of Medicine. Oquendo was also awarded the 2018 Delores Shockley Minority Mentoring Award by the American College of Neuropsychopharmacology for "successfully mentoring young scientists from underrepresented groups in the field of neuropsychopharmacology and related disciplines."
