= Taraxein =

Possibly nonexistent protein in blood

Taraxein is a possibly nonexistent protein isolated from the blood of patients with schizophrenia, claimed by Robert Galbraith Heath to produce schizophrenia-like symptoms when injected into healthy subjects. Despite initial interest, attempts at confirmation failed. The results are today commonly assumed to be due to self-deception.

The name is derived from the Greek word τάραξις (taraxis), meaning disordered or confused mind.

Taraxein was discovered during the investigation of the hypothesis that catecholamine metabolism is altered in schizophrenia. A blue substance was found in extracts from people with schizophrenia but not normal, and it was claimed that when tested on monkeys this produced the abnormal septal activity the experimenters thought was characteristic of schizophrenia. At the 1956 annual meeting of the American Psychiatric Association Heath announced that they "had induced full symptoms of schizophrenia" in two nonpsychotic prisoner-volunteers from Louisiana State Penitentiary. This was followed by claims of successful induction of symptoms characteristic of schizophrenia in further subjects. The announcement caught the interest of the popular press and the scientific community. However, the latter was concerned with both the double-blind procedure, the claimed total lack of placebo effect, and a failure by an outside team to replicate the findings. When outside further replication failed interest ebbed.

Heath continued to stand by taraxein, and later reported that it is associated with immunoglobulins, supporting his autoimmune theory of schizophrenia. However, outside attempts at replication of these results also failed.

Taraxein has CAS registry number 9010-30-4.
