= Ludwig Ferdinand Meyer =

German-Israeli pediatrician and child nutritionist (1879–1954)

Ludwig Ferdinand Meyer (May 23, 1879 – September 19, 1954) was a pediatrician and nutrition expert (especially nutrition of infants and children), professor of medicine at the University of Berlin and the Hebrew University of Jerusalem.

== Biography ==
Meyer studied medicine in Germany in Munich, Berlin and Bonn, where he graduated in 1902, working for three years in the Charite hospital in Berlin before moving in 1905 to work with the eminent pediatrician Heinrich Finkelstein, with whom he also wrote articles and chapters in many medical books. After Finkelstein's retirement Meyer was appointed director of the Emperor Frederick Berlin Hospital but in May 1933 was forced to resign due to the Nazi racial laws. In 1935 he immigrated to Israel with his wife Lotte, daughter Ilse and son in law, Professor Walter Hirsch and his grandson Daniel (later psychiatrist and author bestseller Dr. Daniel Offer) and settled first in Jerusalem where he served as head of the Bikur Holim Hospital for a year. Then he moved Tel Aviv and appointed head of pediatrics at Hadassah Hospital and pediatric consultant at the hospital Tzahalon (Dajani).

Professor Meyer was the world's leading child nutritionists at his time, studied the salt content of infant nutrition and invented one of the first artificial food for children based on cow's milk. He wrote many articles and several books, first in German in 1930, and later on in English. In 1969, the Municipality of Berlin decided to place a memorial plaque on the site of the department he ran in the thirties in the Kaiser- und Kaiserin-Friedrich-Kinderkrankenhauses Hospital.
