= Howard P. Rome =

American psychiatrist

Howard P. Rome (25 November 1910, Philadelphia - 29 October 1992) was an American psychiatrist.

After studies at University of Pennsylvania and Temple University School of Medicine, he joined the Mayo Clinic in 1947 where he was elected president of the medical staff in 1965. Among his patients was Ernest Hemingway. He also served as professor of psychiatry at Mayo Medical School.

He wrote a psychological autopsy of Lee Harvey Oswald for the Warren Commission.

He was president of the World Psychiatric Association from 1972 to 1976 and served on the editorial board of Psychiatric Annals.
