= Psychiatric Annals =

- Discipline: Psychiatry
- Language: English
- Edited by: Andrew A. Nierenberg

Publication details
- History: 1971-present
- Publisher: Slack
- Frequency: Monthly
- Open access: Hybrid
- Impact factor: 0.336 (2017)

Standard abbreviations
- ISO 4: Psychiatr. Ann.

Indexing
- ISSN: 0048-5713 (print); 1938-2456 (web)
- LCCN: 2008212587
- OCLC no.: 882742346

Links
- Journal homepage; Online access; Online archive

Psychiatric Annals is a monthly peer-reviewed review journal covering the field of psychiatry. It is published by Slack and the editor-in-chief is Andrew A. Nierenberg (Harvard Medical School).

== History ==
The journal was established in September 1971 under the editorship of Dana Farnsworth and Howard P. Rome. It was published by Insight Communications In 1975, Francis Braceland became co-editor. In 1977 the journal published a collection of articles in book format, titled Psychiatrists and the legal process : diagnosis and debate. The articles had previously been published in the journal in the period 1973–1977. Nancy Arnold Roeske became editor in the early 1980s, when Farnsworth and Braceland stepped down.

In 1980 the publication was acquired by Charles B. Slack (later shortened to just Slack). Roeske continued as editor until her death in 1986. In the wake of this circumstance Howard Rome assumed the main editorial responsibility. In 1988 the journal focused on problems of adolescent medical care in its December issue.

In 1992 the journal welcomed Jan Fawcett to the editorial board. Fawcett took on responsibilities as co-editor alongside Howard Rome, and stayed on as editor of the journal until 2018.

In April 2018 SLACK Incorporated announced that it was introducing a new format and a new editor, Andrew A. Nierenberg, to the journal. New features included a mix of peer-reviewed articles, original research, and case reports; peer-tested content; updated printing design; and a new editorial board.

== Abstracting and indexing ==
The journal is abstracted and indexed in Current Contents/Social & Behavioral Sciences, ProQuest databases, PsycINFO, Scopus, and the Social Sciences Citation Index. According to the Journal Citation Reports, the journal has a 2017 impact factor of 0.336.
