= Nada Stotland =

American psychiatrist

Nada Logan Stotland (born August 15, 1943) is an American psychiatrist and the 135th president of the American Psychiatric Association.

== Education ==
Stotland received her undergraduate degree from the University of Chicago, where she later received her M.D. and also completed her residency.

== Career ==
Stotland later joined the faculty of the University of Chicago, where she held multiple different positions, including Director of Psychiatric Consultation-Liaison Service and Director of Psychiatric Education. She later left this university to become medical coordinator for the Illinois Department of Mental Health, and after that, became the chair of psychiatry at the Illinois Masonic Medical Center. She served as the 135th president of the American Psychiatric Association from 2008 to 2009. As of July 2012, she held two professorships in two different departments at Rush Medical College, one in psychiatry and one in obstetrics and gynecology.

== Work ==
Stotland has written about multiple topics in the field of psychiatry, including the alleged adverse mental health effects of abortion.
