= Harvey John Tompkins =

American physician (1906–1983)

Harvey John Tompkins, M.D. (1906–1983) was an American physician, a psychiatrist, whose professional life was in public service.

Tompkins was born in Chicago into a working-class family. His early education was at Holy Cross School and St. Cyril's College in Chicago. He received his B.S. in 1927 and then his M.D. in 1932 from Loyola University Chicago, School of Medicine. He interned at Mercy Hospital in Chicago. His residency in obstetrics and in pediatrics was completed at Lewis Memorial Maternity Hospital in Chicago and the Chicago Municipal Contagious Disease Hospital. In 1934, he entered the U.S. Army as a first lieutenant and assigned to the Civilian Conservation Corps. He served in the Army for 31 years, retiring as a colonel.

In 1935, Tompkins entered his psychiatric residency at the Veterans Administration (VA) Mental Hospital in Little Rock, Arkansas. Through the VA, he traveled to numerous VA mental hospitals: Danville, Illinois, St. Cloud, Minnesota, Knoxville, Tennessee, and Mendota, Wisconsin.

In 1945, as World War II ended, the VA medical service was reorganized and a Division of Psychiatry and Neurology was established. Daniel Blain, M.D, was the director of the new division and he selected Tompkins to be his assistant. Two years later, Blain resigned and Tompkins took his place as Director of the Division of Psychiatry and Neurology. He remained the director until 1955 when he resigned from the VA to accept a position at the St. Vincent's Catholic Medical Center in New York. St. Vincent's was a long-established 600 bed general hospital and there were plans to expand the hospital to 1,000 beds and to include psychiatric services. Tompkins served as a consultant during the planning and construction and upon completion; he headed the new psychiatric service until 1973 when he retired. Under Tompkins's tenure, the psychiatric service grew from eight attending physicians and psychiatric residents to 50 attendings and 28 residents. Training programs were introduced in the areas of psychology, social work, and occupational therapy. St. Vincent's was under the authority of the Catholic Diocese and Tompkins became the coordinator of all psychiatric Catholic sponsored health facilities in the New York area.

Tompkins was a member of numerous medical and psychiatric organizations: the National Academy of Religion and Psychiatry (president, 1957–1958), the New York City Community Mental Health Board, the Chairman of the Advisory Committee of the National Association of Mental Health, the American College of Physicians, the Group for the Advancement of Psychiatry, the American Academy of Neurology, the American Psychiatric Association, (president 1966–1967), a Trustee at the New York School of Psychiatry, Associate Secretary of the World Psychiatric Association, and a corresponding member of the Royal Medico-Psychological Association.

He was a professor of clinical psychiatry at Georgetown University Medical School and at the New York University School of Medicine. In 1965, he delivered the Maudsley Bequest Lecture at a joint meeting of the American Psychiatric Association and the Royal College of Psychiatrists.

Harvey died in New York in 1983.

== Works ==
- Tompkins, Harvey J., and Alfred W. Snedeker. "Care and Treatment of the Psychiatric Patient in the Veterans Administration", American Journal of Psychiatry 103 (January 1947): 467–469.
- Barton, Walter E., Harvey J. Tompkins, and Aaron B. Nadel. "The Need for Uniform Discharge Statistics in Public Psychiatric Hospitals", American Journal of Psychiatry 106 (December 1949): 429–440.
- Tompkins, Harvey J. "State and Veterans Administration Cooperation towards Better Mental Health", American Journal of Psychiatry 111 (September 1954): 172–176.
- Tompkins, Harvey J. "Health Insurance and Psychiatric Therapy", American Journal of Psychiatry 120 (October 1963): 345–349.
- Tompkins, Harvey J. "Psychiatric Treatment in General Hospitals and Private Practice", American Journal of Psychiatry 122 (March 1966): 1011–1014.
- Tompkins, Harvey J. "The Presidential Address: The Physician in Contemporary Society", American Journal of Psychiatry 124 (July 1967): 1–6.
