= Henry Mills Hurd =

American psychiatrist (1843–1927)

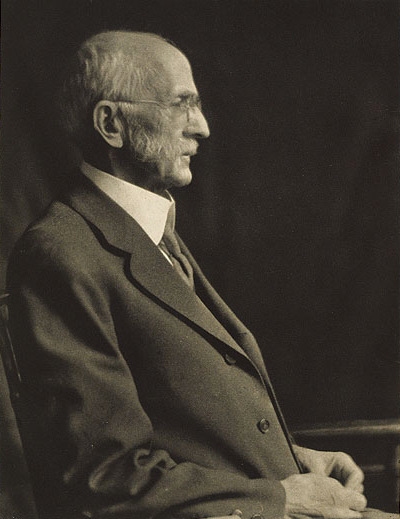
- Hurd in 1922 publication
- Born: May 3, 1843; Union City, Michigan, U.S.
- Died: July 19, 1927 (aged 84)
- Education: Knox College; Rush Medical College
- Alma mater: University of Michigan (BS); University of Michigan School of Medicine (MD)

Henry Mills Hurd (May 3, 1843 – July 19, 1927) was the first director of the Johns Hopkins Hospital and remained in that post for 22 years (1889–1911) following which he was appointed Secretary to the Board of Trustees (1911–1927). He was also the first Professor of Psychiatry at the medical school from its opening in 1893 until 1905.

== Early life ==
Hurd was born in Union City, Michigan, the son of a physician. At age fourteen, he entered Knox College but soon moved to the University of Michigan, receiving a Bachelor of Science in 1863. He began the study of medicine at Rush Medical College in Chicago and, after a year, returned to the University of Michigan Medical College graduating with an M.D. in 1866. He worked as a dispensary physician and practiced medicine in Chicago until 1890 when he moved to Kalamazoo to accept a post as assistant physician at the Michigan Asylum for the Insane. He became assistant Superintendent in 1878 but left a few months later to become the superintendent of the newly opened Eastern Michigan Asylum in Pontiac where he remained for 11 years. In 1881 he visited asylums in Europe. During his stay at Pontiac, he advocated and introduced measures to lessen restraint of patients, to provide occupations for patients and to improve education of nurses. He was served as Secretary of the National Medico-Psychological Association (now the American Psychiatric Association) from 1892–97 and as President (1898–99). In 1895 the University of Michigan awarded him the LL.D. degree.

== Career ==
Psychiatry lodged in the country’s mental hospitals was not a strong discipline in American medicine but when the Trustees of the newly built Johns Hopkins Hospital sought a director, Hurd was selected and assumed the post in 1889.

Johns Hopkins, a Quaker philanthropist in Baltimore, died in 1873, leaving his fortune for the building of a hospital and medical school, stipulating that the two facilities must work together and be devoted to scientific observation, experiment, and personal observation; a new approach to medical training and patient care. The Trustees were fortunate to have the services of John Shaw Billings, physician, Civil War veteran, librarian, and hospital administrator to assist in organizing and planning the new hospital. When Hurd was appointed director, he worked closely with Billings. In 1895, the two published a small volume titled Suggestions to Hospital and Asylum Visitors.

The Johns Hopkins Hospital and Medical School (1893) quickly assumed a leadership role in American medicine. Publication of its work began with the Johns Hopkins Hospital Bulletins and the Johns Hopkins Reports (discontinued in 1926). Hurd was Editor of Publications, producing seventy-two issues of the Bulletin (1899–1906) and sixteen volumes of the Reports. His own publications covered four main areas: psychiatry, hospital management, nursing education, and medical education. Hurd served also on the editorial boards of the American Journal of Insanity and Modern Hospital. He was President of the American Academy of Medicine in 1896 and of the American Hospital Association in 1912.

Hurd will be especially remembered for his Editorship of the monumental four-volume work titled Institutional Care of the Insane in the United States and Canada (1916). Hurd wrote the entire first volume (497 pages) which deals with the history of American psychiatry. The other three volumes describe every public and private asylum and include bibliographies of prominent psychiatrists. The work was undertaken at the request of the American Medico-Psychological Association by a committee of six asylum superintendents with Hurd as Editor in Chief.

== Legacy ==
At the dedication of Hurd Hall in 1932, an addition to the hospital, Judge Henry Harlan, a trustee, said of Hurd, “his statesmanship, tact, kindness, and breadth of vision; his harmonizing influence and generous appreciation and admiration created between Hospital and University a spirit of cooperation and admiration for achievements of the other and marked the relationship of the hospital and medical school.”

An associate said of Hurd, “If he had any faults, I’ve forgotten them”.

== Works ==
Hurd, Henry M. Future Provision for the Insane in Michigan. [Michigan?], 1883.

Hurd, Henry M. The Hereditary Influence of Alcoholic Indulgence upon the Production of Insanity. Lansing, 1883.

Hurd, Henry M. Some Early Reminiscences of William Osler. [Baltimore?: s.n., 1919?]

Hurd, Henry M. The Institutional Care of the Insane in the United States and Canada. Baltimore, Hopkins, 1916-1917. https://archive.org/details/cu31924012458083

Billings, John Shaw, and Henry M. Hurd, eds. Hospitals, Dispensaries, and Nursing. New York: Garland, 1893. https://archive.org/details/hospitalsdispens00unse

Billings, John Shaw, and Henry M. Hurd. Suggestions to Hospital and Asylum Visitors. Philadelphia: Lippincott, 1895. https://archive.org/details/suggestionstohos00bill
