= Daniel Blain =

American physician (1898–1981)

Daniel Blain, M.D. (1898–1981) was an American physician and was the first medical director of the American Psychiatric Association (APA), the first professional medical society, founded in the United States in 1844. He may be credited with the leadership which brought changes in the practice of psychiatry after World War II and in advocating the treatment for people with mental disorders.

Blain was born in China to missionary parents. His mother tutored him at home until he was 11 years old and was sent to boarding school in Shanghai. At age 13, he came to the United States to continue his education and worked through high school and college. He obtained his undergraduate degree from Washington and Lee University in Lexington, Virginia. He left the university after his second year to teach at Hangchow College in China. He attended the University of Chicago for pre-medicine studies then entered the medical school at Vanderbilt University. He received his M.D. in 1929. He interned at the Peter Bent Brigham Hospital in Boston, Massachusetts, and then trained at the Boston City Hospital. His residency in psychiatry was completed at the Austen Riggs Center in Stockbridge, Massachusetts. In 1941, he opened his private psychiatric practice in New York City. In 1972, he was awarded an LLD degree by La Salle University in Philadelphia, Pennsylvania, and an honorary Sc.D. from Washington and Lee University.

With the start of World War II, Blain was commissioned into the U.S. Public Health Service (USPHS), and was the medical director for the War Shipping Administration (WSA). Through the WSA, Blain directed the provision of medical care for casualties in the Merchant Marine Service. When the war ended, he was recommended to lead the Psychiatric and Neurologic Division in the Department of Medicine and Surgery in the Veterans Administration (VA) to provide care for World War II veterans. Blain was instrumental in providing psychiatric and neurologic care to thousands of veterans who were rehabilitating in inadequate VA hospital facilities and VA outpatient clinics which had inadequate numbers of trained medical staff. Blain forged relationships between the newly organized National Institute of Mental Health (NIMH) of the USPHS, and with medical schools and universities. The new relationships between the VA hospitals and clinics established training programs in psychiatry, neurology, psychology, social work, and psychiatric nursing which led to the infusion of trained professional medical staff. Blain reorganized the Psychiatric and Neurologic Division's central office by adding trained staff who were responsible for the patients.

Blain was in the VA post for two years (1946–1948) when the American Psychiatric Association (APA) reorganized, and established the position of medical director. The APA offered the position to Blain. He accepted and was the medical director for ten years. He also served as the chairman of the Department of Psychiatry at Georgetown University Hospital from 1947 to 1948.

One of Blain's first undertakings was moving the APA's main office from New York City to Washington, D.C., and to adequately staff the office. Since most psychiatrists were stationed in state mental hospitals and a small number of private mental hospitals, Blain began to visit the state hospitals to establish channels of communication with the APA membership. He began a four-page newsletter. He was appalled at the inhumane conditions he found at some state hospitals, which led to calling a meeting of hospital superintendents to exchange information and suggest improvements in patient care. Thus, the first Mental Hospital Institute was organized in 1949 and continues to meet annually. The Mental Hospital Institute Proceedings were published and led to the journal Mental Hospitals.

After ten years as the APA Medical Director, Blain resigned in the 1950s. He spent a year as the director of Mental Health and Research and Training of the Interstate Commission of Higher Education. He then moved to California to serve as the Commissioner of Mental Health from 1959 to 1963. He retired to the Institute of Pennsylvania Hospital, a private mental hospital in Philadelphia where he served as director of the community psychiatric program. He was named emeritus Professor of Clinical Psychiatry at the University of Pennsylvania Medical School. He also worked with the United Auto Workers to help organize the financing of mental health programs for the unionized auto workers.

From 1966 to 1970, Blain was the superintendent of Philadelphia State Hospital at Byberry which had a long history of custodial care.

Blain was involved in numerous professional activities. He was a consultant to the Alaska Health Department, which was establishing the state's first mental hospital. Blain reportedly visited over 500 mental hospitals during his career. In 1975, the Salmon Committee of the New York Academy of Medicine awarded him its Distinguished Service Medal. He served as chairman of the Psychiatry Department at Georgetown Medical School from 1946 to 1948.

Blain was a member of numerous professional organizations including the APA (president, 1964–1965), the American College of Psychiatrists, the American Psychoanalytic Association, the American Association of Mental Deficiency, the Canadian Psychiatric Association, the Australian College of Psychiatrists, and the Royal College of Psychiatry.

He died in Philadelphia in 1981.

== Works ==
- Blain, Daniel. "The Presidential Address: 'Novalescence'," The American Journal of Psychiatry 122 (July 1965):1-12.
- Blain, Daniel, and Ralph M. Chambers. The Study of Standards for Inpatient Care for the New York City Mental Health Board. Washington, 1957.
