= George Alder Blumer =

George Alder Blumer, M.D. (May 25, 1857–1940) was a physician, a mental hospital administrator, and a journal editor. He was a leader in the provision of humanitarian care for mental hospital patients.

== Early life and education ==
Blumer was born in Sunderland, England. His father was a physician as were his two brothers. His early education in England was followed by schooling in Germany and France. In 1874, he entered the medical school at the University of Edinburgh and remained for one year before he emigrated to the United States. He completed his medical degree at the University of Pennsylvania School of Medicine and graduated in 1879.

== Career ==
=== Early career ===
After a residency of one year at Lankenau Medical Center in Wynnewood, Pennsylvania, he obtained a post of assistant physician at the New York State Lunatic Asylum in Utica, New York, under the superintendency of John P. Gray, M.D., a prominent psychiatrist. Gray died in 1886 and Blumer became the superintendent of Utica.

=== Reforms at Utica ===
Blumer instituted many reforms at Utica. He abolished all forms of patient restraints, improved living conditions for patients, placed women nurses on male wards, established occupations and amusements for patients, and succeeded in officially changing the name of the institution to Utica State Hospital.

=== Conflict with the New York State Commission on Lunacy ===
In 1890, the New York State legislature established a State Commission on Lunacy with the director to be responsible for the administration of the state mental hospitals. The Commission of two lay members and a chief psychiatrist began to follow the legislature’s charge but encountered opposition from the state hospital superintendents who, until then, exercised total control of their institutions. It was an ongoing struggle between the Commission and the superintendents, and Blumer took an active role.

Blumer’s struggle with the Commission included the Commission’s attempt to take over the leading psychiatric publication in the United States, the American Journal of Insanity. The journal had been established and edited by Amariah Brigham, the first superintendent at Utica and was owned by the hospital. An earlier court ruling confirmed that the hospital owned the journal. Blumer arranged for the American Medico-Psychological Association, now the American Psychiatric Association, to purchase the journal and publish it as the Journal of the American Psychiatric Association, which continues today. As editor of the American Journal of Insanity, Blumer influenced the psychiatric community. He remained an editor emeritus of the journal until he died.

=== Superintendent at Butler Hospital ===
In 1899, he accepted the post of Superintendent of the private Butler Hospital in Providence, Rhode Island where he remained until his retirement in 1921. Blumer remained in Providence after retirement and was named Superintendent Emeritus of Butler.

== Presidency and later life ==
Blumer was elected president of the American Psychiatric Association from 1903 to 1904. His presidential address dealt with the politicization of state mental hospitals, eugenics, and the role of immigration relating to state hospital missions.

While at Butler, Blumer participated in numerous community organizations. He was president of the Providence Athenaeum in Rhode Island, a trustee of the Rhode Island School of Design, president of the Rhode Island Historical Society, on the Board of Visitors at Brown University, and director of the State Mental Hygiene Society.

Blumer received honorary degrees from Brown University (L.H.D., 1905) and from Hamilton College (L.H.D. 1921). He was named an honorary member of Phi Beta Kappa in 1921 by Brown University.

== Death ==
He died in 1940.

== Works ==
Blumer, George A. "A Case of Perverted Sexual Instinct (conträre Sexualempfindung)," American Journal of Insanity (1882): 22-35.

Blumer, George A. "Syphilis and Intemperance," Transactions of the New York State Medical Association (1891): 325-341.

Blumer, George A. "Music in its Relation to the Mind," American Journal of Insanity (1891-1892): 350-364.

Blumer, George A. "A Half-Century of American Medico-Psychological Literature," Proceedings of the American Medico-Psychological Association (1895): 145-155.

Blumer, George A. "The Halliday Case," The Brooklyn Medical Journal (1895): 162-173.

Blumer, George A. "Notes Taken from the Clinical Lectures of James Gregory, of Edinburgh, in 1787," Albany Medical Annals: A Journal of the Medical Society of the County of Albany (1897): 356-360.

Blumer, George A. "The Medical and Material Aspects of Industrial Employment for the Insane," Proceedings of the American Medico-Psychological Association (1897): 230-238.

Blumer, George A. "The Insane of the Antilles," American Journal of Insanity (1898-1899): 713-723.

Blumer, George A. "Feigned Insanity," Albany Medical Annals: A Journal of the Medical Society of the County of Albany (1899): 207-211.

Blumer, George A. "The Care of the Insane in Farm Dwellings," Proceedings of the American Medico-Psychological Association (1899): 326-336.

Blumer, George A. "Addresses Delivered at the Opening of the Pathological Laboratory of the Rhode Island Hospital, 10 May 1900," The Providence Medical Journal (1900): 83-85.

Blumer, George A. "The Yesterday and To-day of Mental Medicine," The Providence Medical Journal (1901): 101-111 and in the Transactions of the Rhode Island Medical Society (1902): 290-308.

Blumer, George A. "Presidential Address," American Journal of Insanity (1903): 1-18.

Blumer, George A. "The Coming of Psychasthenia," Journal of Nervous & Mental Disease (1906): 336-353.

Blumer, George A. "Little Biographies and the Eponymic Diseases: Luther Vose Bell," Albany Medical Annals: A Journal of the Medical Society of the County of Albany (1908): 499-501.
