= The Opal =

The Opal (1851–1860) is a ten volume journal written, edited and printed by the patients of the Utica State Lunatic Asylum, circa 1851. On its more than 3,000 pages, writers talked of their experiences and world views, giving great insight to the environment of New York's premiere state-operated Asylum, in Utica, New York. Themes that continuously arose in the poetry, prose, political commentary, and articles about insanity include issues concerning medication, restraint, seclusion, human rights, liberty, overcoming oppression, and support.

== History ==
The idea for publishing a patients' journal likely originated during the superintendency of Dr Amariah Brigham, a firm believer in the curative value of mental occupation. Prior to the birth of The Opal, Brigham had included several pieces of patient writing in his American Journal of Insanity, which was also produced in the printing office of the institution. Though Brigham died in 1849, the decision of his successor (Dr Nathan Benedict) to launch a patient publication was clearly influenced by Brigham's ideas.

== See also ==
- Psychiatric survivors movement
