= Edward Nathaniel Brush =

American physician (1852–1933)

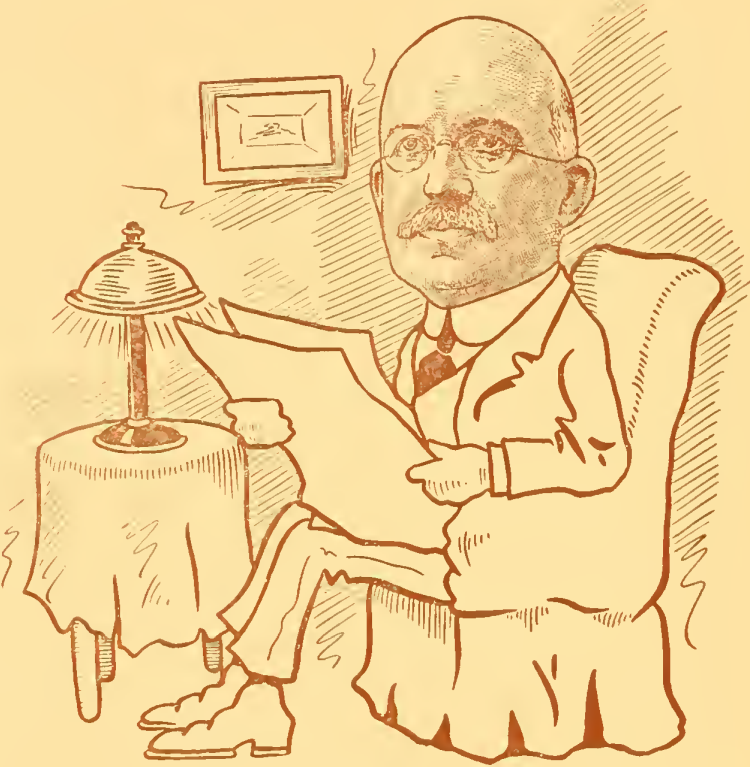
- Caricature of Brush in 1916 publication
- Born: April 23, 1852; Glenwood, Erie County, New York, U.S.
- Died: January 10, 1933 (aged 80); Baltimore, Maryland, U.S.
- Resting place: Green Mount Cemetery; Baltimore, Maryland, U.S.
- Education: University of Buffalo
- Occupations: Physician; editor; educator
- Spouses: Delia A. Hawley (died 1911) Marie T. Hartman (m. 1914)
- Children: 3

Edward Nathaniel Brush (April 23, 1852 – January 10, 1933) was an American physician, a mental hospital administrator, and an editor of psychiatric journals.

== Early life ==
Edward Nathaniel Brown was born on April 23, 1852, in Glenwood, Erie County, New York, to Myra Theresa (née Warren) and Nathaniel Howland Brush. He attended public and private schools, and entered studied medicine at the University of Buffalo. He graduated in 1874. His thesis was on syphilitic infections of the nervous system. In 1871, he began working under Dr. Julius Miner, professor of surgery, and owner of The Buffalo Journal of Medicine and Surgery.

== Career ==
After receiving his medical degree, Brush opened his practice in Buffalo, New York. He served as editor for The Buffalo Journal of Medicine and Surgery from March 1874 to 1878, and published four articles in the journal. He lectured in electro-therapeutics at the University of Buffalo medical school from 1877 to 1879. In 1876, he became a visiting physician at the Sisters of Charity Hospital in Buffalo. In 1878, he accepted the position of assistant physician at the Utica State Hospital (originally the New York State Lunatic Asylum), and practiced there until 1884. The Utica State Hospital owned and published The American Journal of Insanity, with John Gray, as its editor. Brush became associate editor of the journal.

In 1884, his former colleague at Utica, John Chapin was called to the Pennsylvania Hospital in Philadelphia to become physician-in-chief of the Department of the Insane. Chapin invited Brush to join him in Philadelphia, and Brush accepted the offer. He worked at the hospital for two years. He continued working with the editorial board of The American Journal of Insanity.

The Sheppard and Enoch Pratt Hospital, a private mental hospital in Baltimore, opened in 1891, and Brush accepted the role of superintendent on February 9, 1891. He stayed until his retirement in 1920. He was a professor of psychiatry at the College of Physicians and Surgeons in Baltimore until 1920. He continued to serve on the editorial Board and as editor of The American Journal of Insanity, which became The American Journal of Psychiatry in 1921 when it was bought by the American Psychiatric Association (APA). Brush became editor emeritus in 1931.

Brush was active in psychiatric and mental health activities throughout his professional life. His editorial positions gave him a window on psychiatric activities in the country. He was influential among psychiatric and lay groups. He joined the American Neurological Association in 1890. He served as President of the Baltimore Medical Society in 1908, and the Medical Chirurgical Society of Maryland in 1905. He was an honorary member of the Medico-Psychological Association of Great Britain and Ireland, an honorary member of the Société Royale de Médecine Mentale de Belgique, and was a Foreign Associate member of the Société Médico-Psychologique in Paris. He was President of the American Psychiatric Association from 1915 to 1916. During World War I, he served on the Advisory Board and the Draft board in Baltimore.

In 1902, Brush traveled to Germany to study continental psychiatric clinics. In 1907, he was a delegate to the International Congress of Psychiatry, Neurology and Psychology at Amsterdam.

== Personal life ==
Brush married Delia A. Hawley of Buffalo. She died in December 1911. Brush married Marie T. Hartman on August 6, 1914. He had two daughters and one son, Mrs. W. Hall Harris Jr., Mrs. Lloyd Parker Shippen and Nathaniel H.

After his retirement from Sheppard and Enoch Pratt Hospital, Brush remained in Baltimore until his death. Brush died on January 10, 1933, of pneumonia at his home at 2012 Greenberry Road in Mount Washington, Baltimore. He was buried at Green Mount Cemetery in Baltimore.

== Awards and legacy ==
In 1932, at the 40th meeting of the American Psychiatric Association, the annual dinner honored Brush on his 80th birthday. He was presented with a vellum scroll of appreciation for his 41 years on the editorial board The American Journal of Psychiatry, serving as editor from 1904 to 1931.

== Works ==
- Brush, Edward N. Notes on Some Clinical Experiences with Insomnia. London: R. Clay & Sons, 1889.
- Brush, Edward N. “Syphilitic Affections of the Nervous System,” Buffalo Medical and Surgical Journal 14(3) (October 1874): 81-91.
- Brush, Edward N. “Syphilitic Affections of the Nervous System,” Buffalo Medical and Surgical Journal 14(4) (November 1874): 130-134.
- Brush, Edward N. “Feigned Insanity,” American Journal of Psychiatry 35(4) (April 1879):534-542.
- Brush, Edward N. “Notes of a Visit to Some of the Asylums of Great Britain,” American Journal of Psychiatry 39(3) (January 1883): 269-300.
- Brush, Edward N. “An Analysis of One Hundred Cases of Acute Melancholia,” British Medical Journal 2 (September 1897): 777-779.
- Brush, Edward N. “Our Work as Psychiatrists and its Opportunities,” The American Journal of Insanity 73(1) (July 1916): 1-17.
- Farrar, C.B. “Obituary: Edward Brush,” American Journal of Psychiatry 12(4) (January 1933): 853-854.
