= James Bailey Silkman =

American lawyer

James Bailey Silkman (October 9, 1819 – February 4, 1888) was an American newspaper editor and lawyer.

Silkman was graduated at Yale University in 1845, studied law, and after laboring as a journalist, was admitted to the bar in 1850, soon establishing a good practice. Prior to the American Civil War, he caused much excitement by introducing resolutions against slavery in the New York diocesan convention of the Protestant Episcopal church. After the war, he became greatly interested in religious matters, and was at one time identified With the Fulton street prayer-meeting. Subsequently, he was converted to Spiritualism, and remained until his death one of its foremost adherents. So pronounced were his views on this subject that his family had him examined to decide with regard to his sanity, and in 1883, he was committed to the Utica asylum. From this decision, he appealed, and after a long litigation in the courts, he recovered a verdict of US$15,000 damages against his son and his son-in-law for false imprisonment. An appeal from this verdict was nearing at the time of his death. On being released from Utica, he reopened his law-office and recovered a portion of his practice, but made the chief aim of his life thereafter to procure the release of those inmates of the Utica asylum that he claimed were unjustly confined. In this, owing to his ability as a lawyer and his persistence, he was unusually successful, and a number were released at different times through his efforts.

== Early life and education ==
James Bailey Silkman was born in Bedford, New York, on October 9, 1819, the son of Daniel Silkman, of Dutch descent, and Sarah (Bailey) Silkman. In his childhood his father met with the loss of his property, and the son's preparation for college (entering Yale University in the Sophomore year) was thereby deferred.

== Career ==
He taught school after graduation, as he had done before. In the fall of 1846, entered the law office of Theodore Sedgwick, Esq., in New York City. Before long, however, he procured through Sedgwick's influence a position as assistant editor of the New York Evening Post; this he resigned after two years, to become night editor of the New York Courier and Enquirer, while continuing law studies. In December, 1850, he was admitted to the bar, devoting himself to real estate and office practice. In politics, originally a Democrat, his anti-slavery zeal drove him to become a Republican. During the Civil War, he was an active supporter of the Union.

For many years, he gave much attention to Sunday school work and the temperance cause, and was a prominent figure in the Fulton-street prayer-meeting. Eventually, he became an ardent Spiritualist, and in 1882, was placed by some of his relatives under restraint in an insane asylum. Litigation ensued, which resulted in his release, and he gave much of his time afterwards to the investigation of cases alleged to be of a similar character, including that of Clarissa Caldwell Lathrop, who detailed her confinement in A Secret Institution.

== Personal life ==
In 1856 he married Harriette V. C., daughter of the Rev. Alexander H. Crosby, Rector of the Episcopal Church in Yonkers, New York, where Silkman afterwards resided. In January, 1888, he had a bout of pneumonia, from which he partially recovered, but heart failure resulted in his death, at a hospital in New York City, on February 4, 1888, in his 69th year.
