= Clarissa Caldwell Lathrop =

American social reformer and autobiographer

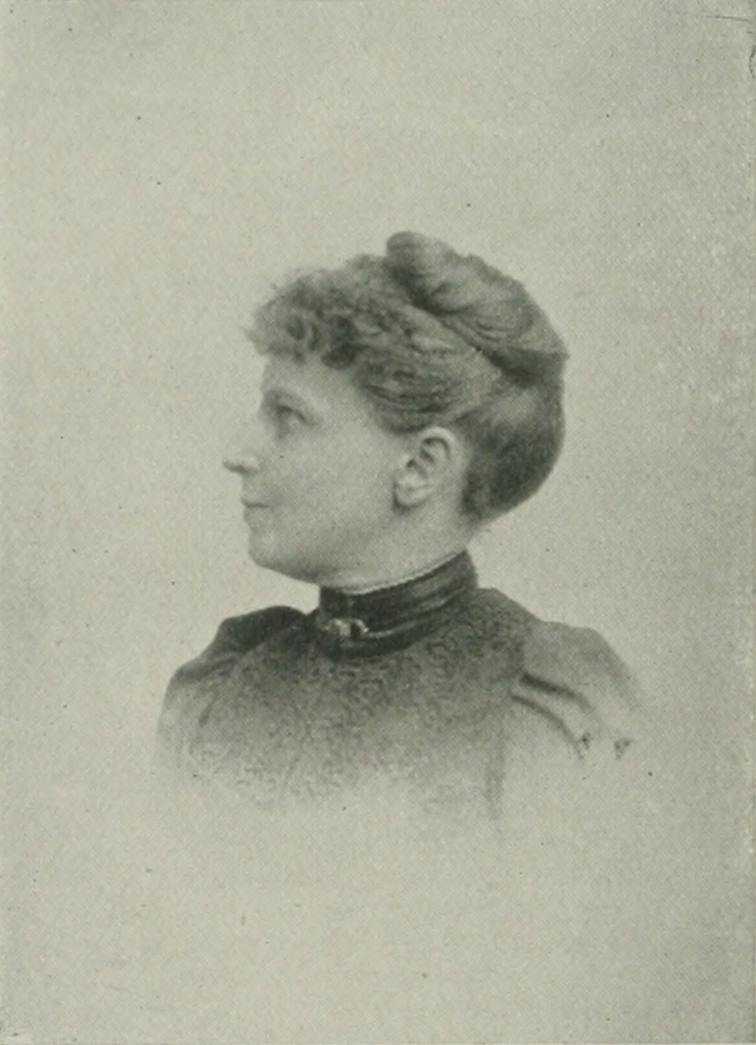
- Photo in A Woman of the Century
- Born: April 12, 1847; Rochester, New York, U.S.
- Died: September 11, 1892 (aged 45); Saratoga, New York, U.S.
- Resting place: Mount Hope Cemetery, Rochester
- Occupations: Social reformer, autobiographer
- Writing career
- Notable work: A Secret Institution

Clarissa Caldwell Lathrop (April 12, 1847 – September 11, 1892) was an American social reformer and autobiographer. Her prominence came from her experience after being confined and unlawfully imprisoned in the Utica Lunatic Asylum for 26 months (October 1880 – December 1882), through a plot to kill her. Eventually, she was pronounced sane and unlawfully incarcerated. She devoted the rest of her life to ameliorating the laws relating to lunacy. She became a court stenographer, and wrote a book about her own institutionalization, entitled A Secret Institution. Published at her own expense, this book led to the formation of the Lunacy Law Reform League, in 1889, a national organization with headquarters in New York City, of which Lathrop was the national organizer and served as secretary.

== Early life and education ==
Clarissa Caldwell Lathrop was born in Rochester, New York, April 12, 1847. She was a daughter of Gen. William E. Lathrop, a Brigadier General of the National Guard. Lathrop's father had met and married Lathrop's mother, Jemima, at the age of 42 – Jemima was 19. Lathrop had been one of five children, but had lost her eldest brother to disease in 1865 and her second eldest brother moved to the southern part of the country to look for work. Lathrop's father died in 1877 leaving his wife, and his three daughters to open their home to board strangers for income.

She graduated from the Rochester Academy.

Lathrop also often traveled significant distances and visited friends around Rochester.

== Career ==
=== Teacher ===
Lathrop became a teacher, which, owing to her father's failure in business, became a means of support to her family as well as to herself. She continued to teach successfully until her unlawful imprisonment in the Utica State Hospital (formerly known as the New York State Lunatic Asylum at Utica).

=== Utica Lunatic Asylum incarceration and release ===
Lathrop feared that Miss Hamlo, a boarder in her mother's house, was poisoning her. Lathrop was obsessed with a Mr. Zell, a former lover who married another woman after Lathrop rejected him. After repenting her decision to reject Zell, Lathrop became convinced that Hamlo was in alliance with Zell's wife. After Lathrop began seeing Zell everywhere, she believed he had divorced, and would now marry her if Lathrop survived Hamlo's poisonings. When Lathrop's life was saved on two occasions by friends, she took some of the aconite-poisoned tea to a chemist for analysis, as she sought reliable proof before making open charges against any one. At the instigation of a doctor who was in sympathy with the plot to incarcerate Lathrop, she went to Utica to consult Dr. John P. Gray, Superintendent of the State Lunatic Asylum in Utica, New York. Instead of seeing Grey, upon her arrival, she was incarcerated with the insane, without the commitment papers required by law, and kept a prisoner at the asylum for 26 months.

She was sent to the Utica Lunatic Asylum at the insistence of her mother and sisters, who lived in Rochester, and who asserted that Lathrop was suffering from the delusion that somebody was trying to poison her. Her answer was that it was not a delusion, that somebody was endeavoring to poison her. But she was willing to accept proof to the contrary, which was also evidence that there was no delusion. Nonetheless, her incarceration ensued. By the time Lathrop was admitted to the asylum, she was 32 years old and unmarried despite engagements to two different men. Her first engagement was broken off by her fiancé due to cold feet and her second betrothed died from consumption.

The hospital, according to Lathrop was “a living tomb.”

Within a few weeks of her arrival at Utica, Lathrop had written letters to two of her physician friends only to find out later that her letters had never been mailed. The attending physician claimed they were not sent because the asylum was not obliged to send her letters “all over the country.” Lathrop was “amazed and dumbfounded” at the idea that not only would her letters be read by the asylum doctors, but that they would never reach their intended destination. Lathrop had easily made a friend who had revealed to her how she would be able to communicate to the outside world without getting caught by the authorities. She obtained paper through another patient who had hidden the contraband in her room. The woman would not out rightly give the paper to Lathrop for fear of punishment for aiding and abetting, but hinted that there was nothing she could do if Lathrop took a page or two while she was elsewhere. Lathrop also wrote on newspaper edges and scraps of wrapping paper which she also hid in her skirt.

Eventually, she managed to communicate with Silkman, a New York lawyer, who had been forcibly carried off and imprisoned in the same insane asylum. He obtained a writ of habeas corpus at once on behalf of Lathrop, and in December, 1882, Judge Barnard of the New York Supreme Court pronounced Lathrop to be sane and unlawfully incarcerated.

=== Social reformer and autobiographer ===
Immediately upon her release, Lathrop went before the New York State Legislature. She described her experience and the necessity for reform. After making another effort the succeeding year, she found herself homeless and penniless, and dependent upon a cousin's generosity for shelter and support, forced to begin her new life under the most difficult circumstances.

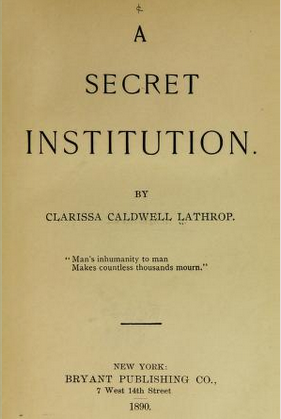
A Secret Institution (1890)

Lathrop collected money for a charitable society on a commission, spending her evenings studying stenography and typewriting. She soon started a business of her own and was successful as a court stenographer. Ten years after her release, she wrote her book, A Secret Institution, which was a history of her own life, written in the style of a novel, and descriptive of what she experienced or witnessed while an inmate of the Utica asylum.

Keeping true to her vow “to devote the rest of [her] life to the cause of the insane,” Lathrop formed the Lunacy Law Reform and the Anti-Kidnapping Leagues. The Leagues provided legal services to asylum patients who felt they were victims of a corrupt legal system. The goal of the leagues was to “protect sane people from false imprisonment.” Both groups had helped several individuals who had been unjustly incarcerated secure their freedom. The Lunacy Law Reform League in 1889, was a national organization having its headquarters in New York City, of which she was secretary and national organizer. Lathrop spoke out against asylum abuses, and became a spokesperson for others incarcerated as insane. She lived with self-doubt, fear, and suspicion, while trying to understand how incarceration affected her. She struggled with society's perceptions of her mental stability.

== Death ==
Lathrop died in Saratoga, New York, on September 11, 1892, and is buried at Mount Hope Cemetery, in Rochester.

== Legal case ==
Albert Bach, legal counsel to Lathrop, held that the interesting point in the case was the question of the deprivation of Lathrop's postal rights while in the asylum. She was not permitted to have writing materials, and even though she succeeded in obtaining them, the asylum authorities disposed of her letters as they pleased. The claim was asserted that asylum managers have no such control over inmates as have prison managers; that the former institutions have more of the character of hospitals. Bach found nothing in the by-laws of the Utica asylum giving the right to this close supervision. He said that there were many instances of wrongful incarceration, and that justice would seem to dictate that inmates of asylums should have access to the mails. Even though much of it would be trash, it would be well worth while to endure that if information could be obtained to the release of a person improperly detained.

Reports suggested that Lathrop would bring a suit of U$25,000 damages against the management of the Utica State Insane Asylum. The grounds alleged were the wrongful detention of herself, and the seizure of her letters written to friends asking them to help her to regain her liberty. Lathrop's lawyer gave the following statement of the scope of the lawsuit:

Of course the main point is in regard to the interception of letters that she wrote to friends asking for assistance. If the managers of the asylums have the right to intercept letters, they have the power to shut a person entirely from the world, whether the person be insane or not. This is a difference between a criminal and a lunatic. In the case of a criminal he is in his position through his own fault, but the insane person is a patient, and deserves all possible consideration. If they stop a person’s letters, they virtually remove from that person the possibility of obtaining release. The suit is brought not so much for the sake of damages, as to test the point whether or not the managers of asylums have a right to enforce such a rule. I have become interested in the matter, and intend to follow it up and test the question thoroughly. One of the things I will do will be to write to the Postmaster General, asking if it would not be advisable in case we can prove that the authorities are wrong in prohibiting the forwarding of letters, to place free delivery boxes in all asylums, that the patients may have a chance to correspond without difficulty with their friends. I believe such a system would do away with much of the abuse that without doubt exists in many asylums, and would greatly lessen the chance of sane persons being held in confinement.
