= Utica Psychiatric Center =

Mental health facility

- Utica State Hospital, Main Building
- U.S. National Register of Historic Places
- U.S. National Historic Landmark
- New York State Register of Historic Places
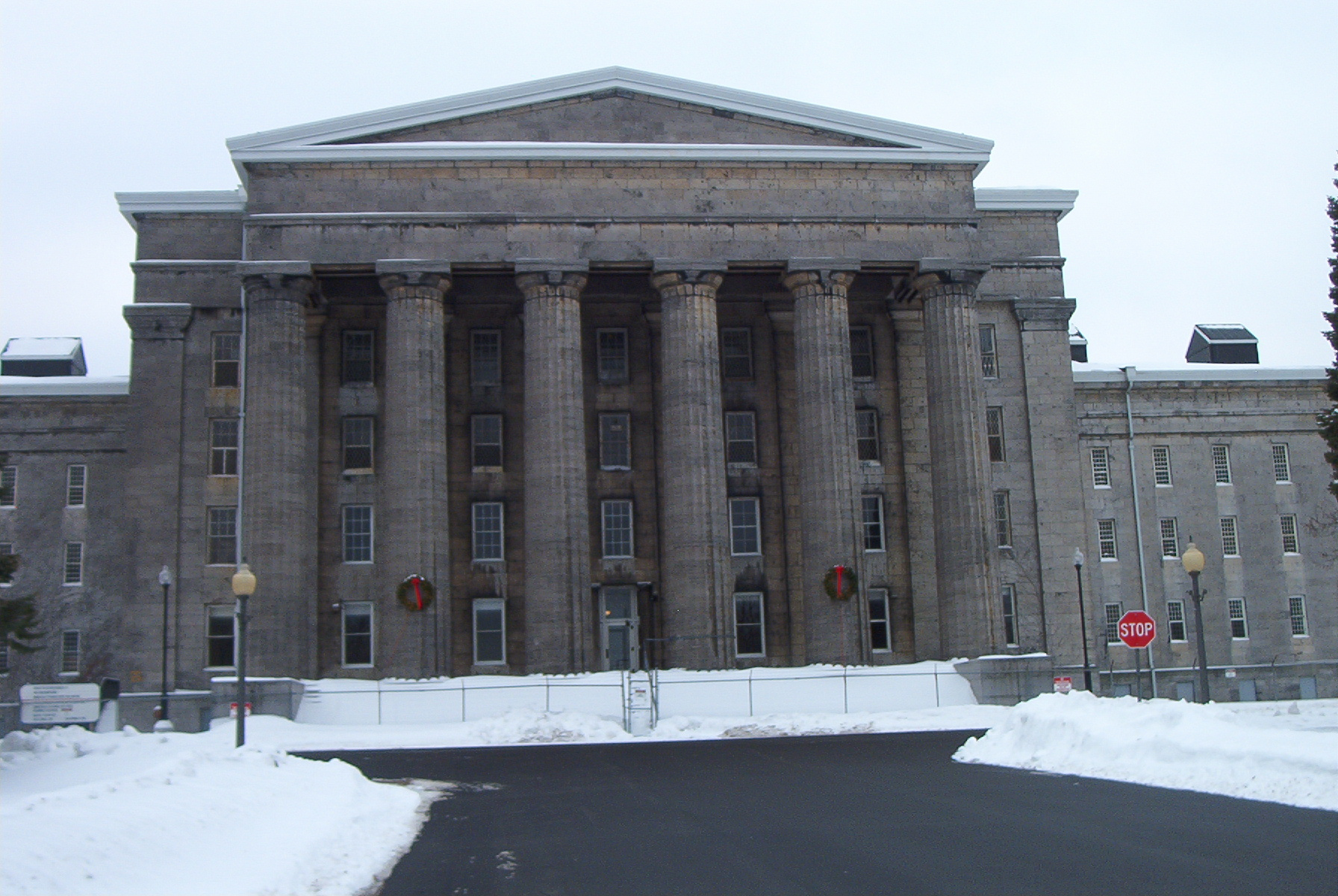

- Location within New York Location within the United States
- Location: 1213 Court Street, Utica, New York 13502
- Coordinates: 43.10496225°N 75.25347233°W
- Built: 1843
- Architect: William Clarke, Andrew Jackson Downing
- Architectural style: Greek Revival
- NRHP reference No.: 71000548
- NYSRHP No.: 06540.000013

Significant dates
- Added to NRHP: October 26, 1971
- Designated NHL: July 30, 1989
- Designated NYSRHP: June 23, 1980

The Utica Psychiatric Center, also known as Utica State Hospital, opened in Utica on January 16, 1843. It was New York's first state-run facility designed to care for the mentally ill, and one of the first such institutions in the United States. It was originally called the New York State Lunatic Asylum at Utica. The Greek Revival structure was designed by Captain William Clarke and its construction was funded by the state and by contributions from Utica residents.

In 1977, the last patients were transferred to other care facilities and the hospital was closed. The hospital building is now used as a records archive for the New York State Office of Mental Health. The hospital was listed as a national historic place on October 26, 1971; the main building was designated as a National Historic Landmark on July 30, 1989. The building sits on the present-day campus of the Mohawk Valley Psychiatric Center along with newer buildings, some of which are still in use for psychiatric and other medical care.

== History ==
New York State Lunatic Asylum, Utica, shortly after completion of Old Main

The Legislature authorized its establishment in 1836. The original plans for the hospital included four identical buildings, set at right angles to one another with a central courtyard. Due to a lack of funds, construction was halted after the first building was completed. This building (Old Main) stands over 50 feet (15 m) high, 550 feet (170 m) long, and nearly 50 feet (15 m) in depth. The six Greek style columns that decorate the front of Old Main stand at 48 feet (15 m) tall and each has an eight-foot (2.4 m) diameter.

The hospital filled quickly and more beds were needed, so the building was enlarged by the addition of wings on either end. These wings opened in 1846, and in 1850, the accommodations were listed as: "380 single rooms for patients, 24 for their attendants, 20 dormitories each accommodating from 5 to 12 persons, 16 parlors or day rooms, 12 dining rooms, 24 bathing rooms, 24 closets and 24 water closets".

The hospital's first director, Amariah Brigham, thought that mental illness was the result of a bad environment, so the facility provided patients with spacious rooms, good nutrition, as well as physical exercise and mental stimulus. He believed in "labor as the most essential of our curative means". Accordingly, patients were encouraged to participate in outdoor tasks, such as gardening, and handicrafts, such as needlework and carpentry. Brigham also introduced an annual fair at the hospital to display and sell items created by the patients. The first fair, in 1844, raised $200, which went toward an addition to the library, musical instruments, and a greenhouse. Some of the asylum inmates also printed a newspaper, called The Opal (10 volumes, 1851–1860), which contained articles, poems, and drawings produced by the patients.

In 1852, Old Main's first floor stairway caught fire. Patients and staff were safely evacuated, but a firefighter and doctor were killed while trying to salvage items from the building. The entire center portion of the building was destroyed. Four days after the fire at Old Main, a barn on the asylum grounds caught fire. William Spiers, a convicted arsonist, former patient, and sporadic employee, was arrested after admitting to setting both fires because he was angry with his supervisor.

A Secret Institution (1890), a 19th-century autobiographical narrative, describes Clarissa Caldwell Lathrop's institutionalization at the asylum for voicing suspicions that someone was trying to poison her.

== American Journal of Insanity ==
In 1844, Brigham founded the first English-language journal devoted to the subject of mental illness, American Journal of Insanity. Brigham was the editor-in-chief, and the journal was printed in the Utica State Hospital printing shop. After Brigham's death, the journal became the property of the hospital and in 1894, the American Medico-Psychological Association bought the journal for $994.50. The journal was later renamed the American Psychiatric Journal.

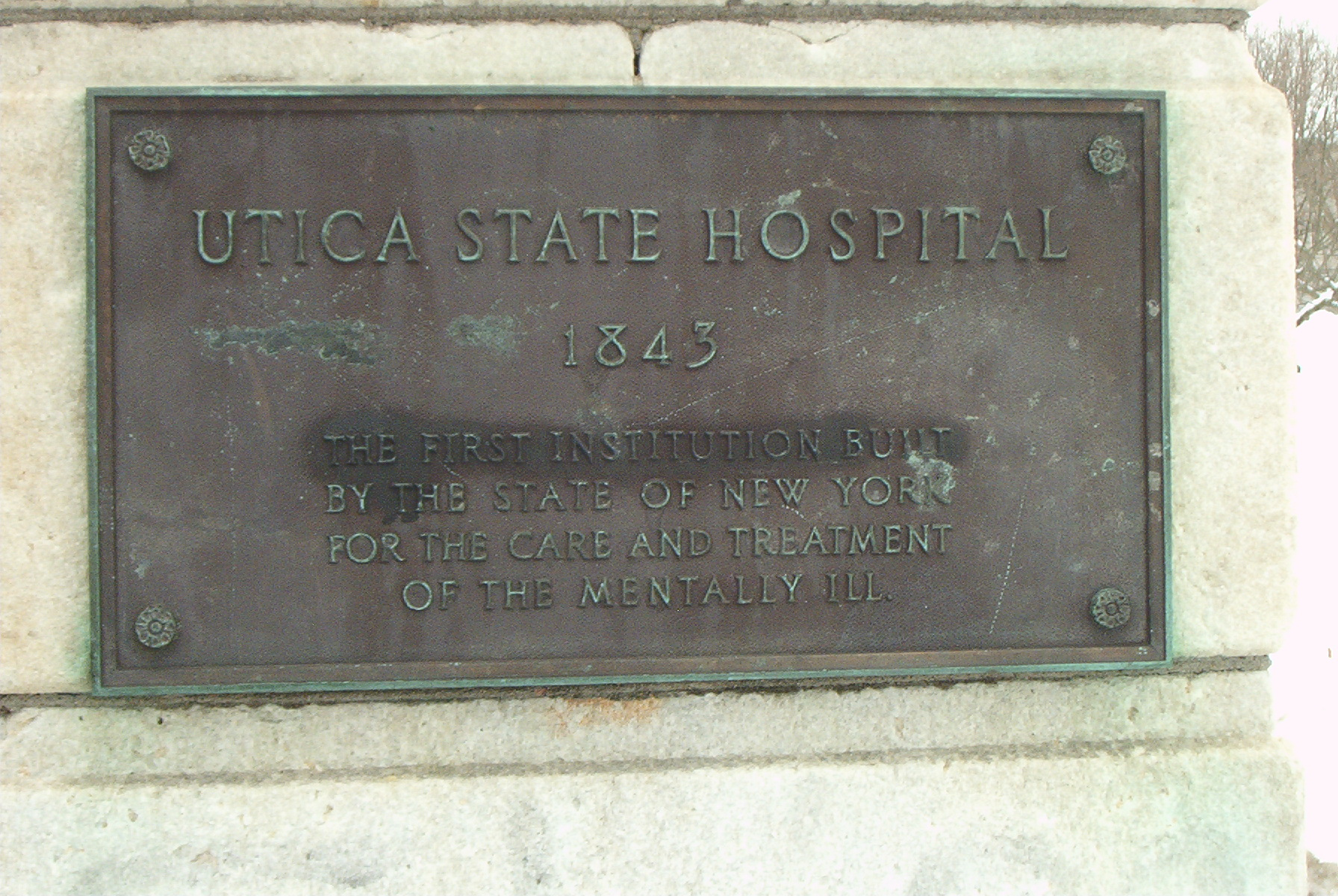
Plaque on gateway pillar on Court Street

== Utica crib ==
Brigham disliked the then-current practice of using chains to restrain patients, and invented the "Utica crib" as an alternative. The Utica crib was an ordinary bed with a thick mattress on the bottom, slats on the sides, and a hinged top that could be locked from the outside. It was eighteen inches (460 mm) deep, eight feet (2.4 m) long, and three feet (0.91 m) wide. Doctors used the Utica crib to control and calm patients who were out of control. While use of the Utica crib was widely criticized, some patients found it to have important therapeutic value. One patient who had slept in the Utica crib for several days commented that he had rested better and found it useful for "all crazy fellows as I, whose spirit is willing, but whose flesh is weak".

In the Edinburgh Medical Journal (February 1878), Dr. Lindsay and other physicians at the Murray Royal Institution at Perth recommended the Utica crib. Lindsay stated that "the bed was practical and safe to patients." However, Dr. Hammond and Dr. Mycert of the Utica State Hospital attacked the Utica crib. Mycert stated that "the crib is at most barbarous and unscientific because there is already a tendency to determine the blood to the brain in excited forms of insanity which is released by the horizontal position in the crib and struggles the patient." Mycert also compared the Utica crib to a coffin. Hammond stated that sometimes patients died from being in the Utica crib. Some of these deaths occurred when attendants thought the patients were out of control when, in fact, they were having a heart attack, a stroke, or some other type of serious health problem. On January 18, 1887, with the help of George Alder Blumer, all Utica cribs were removed from the Utica State Hospital.

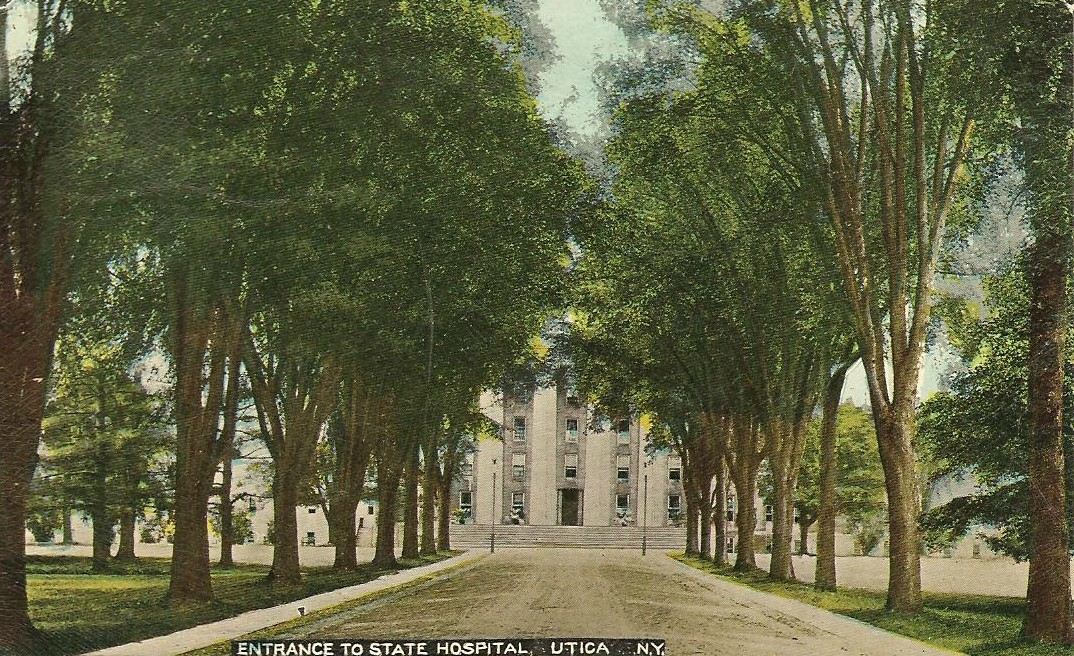
Postcard dated 1912 of "Entrance to State Hospital, Utica, NY"

== Notable people ==
=== Staff ===
- Edward Nathaniel Brush
- John P. Gray

=== Patients ===
- William H. Christian (treated 1886–1887)
- Clarissa Caldwell Lathrop (1880–1882)
- James Bailey Silkman (1882)
- Gerrit Smith (1860), treated with cannabis and morphine

== Photos ==
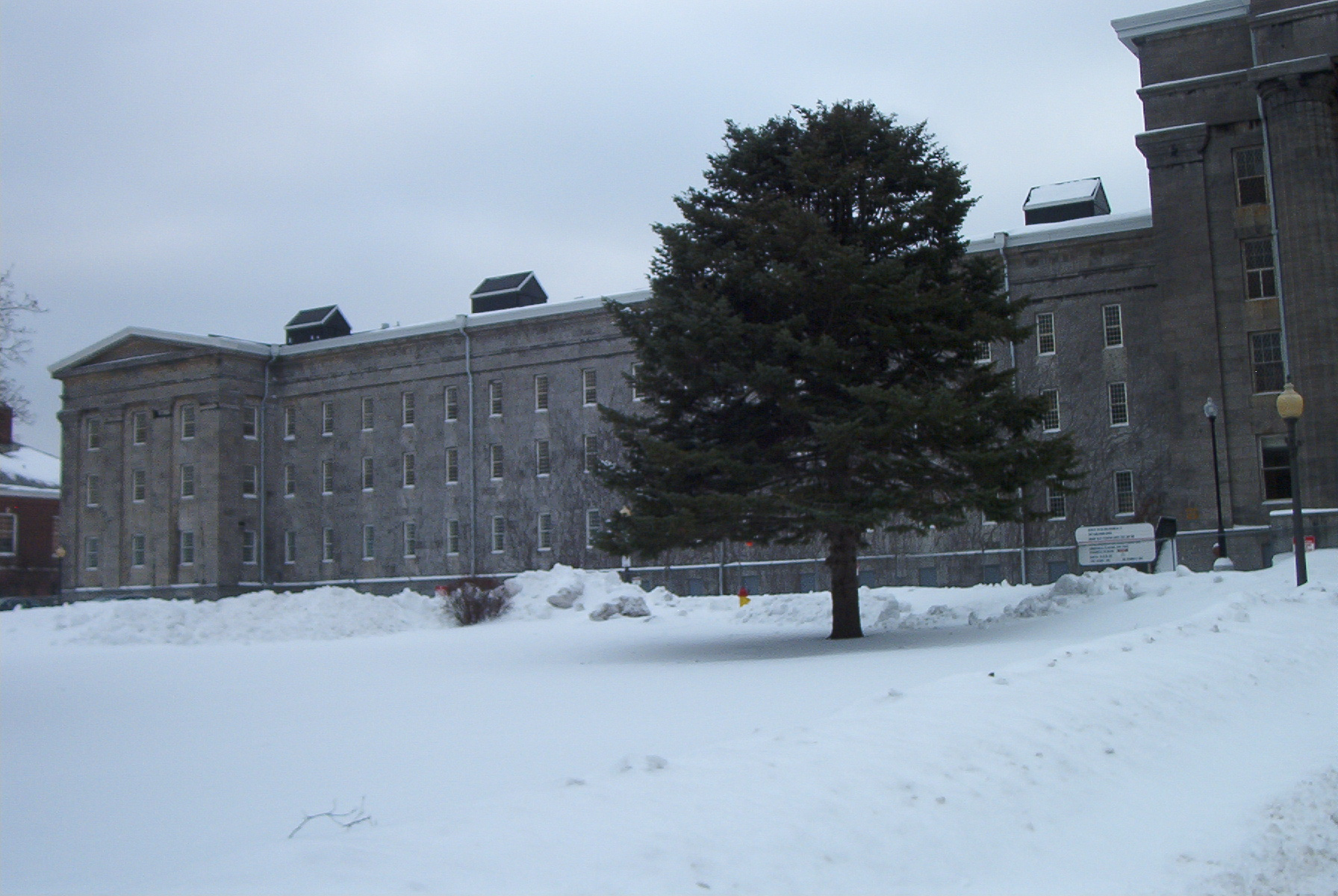
Left side (East end) of Main Building

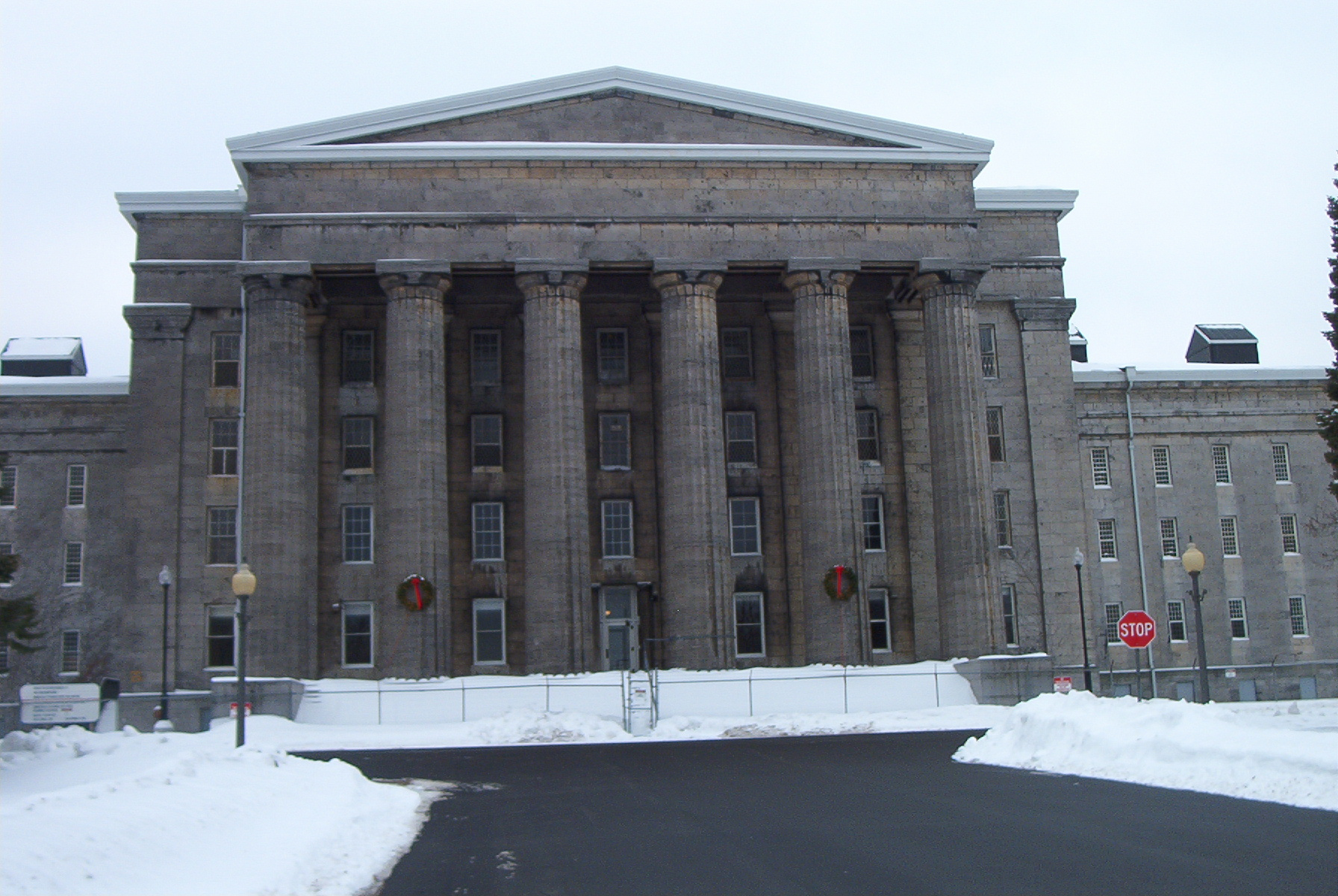
Center of Main Building

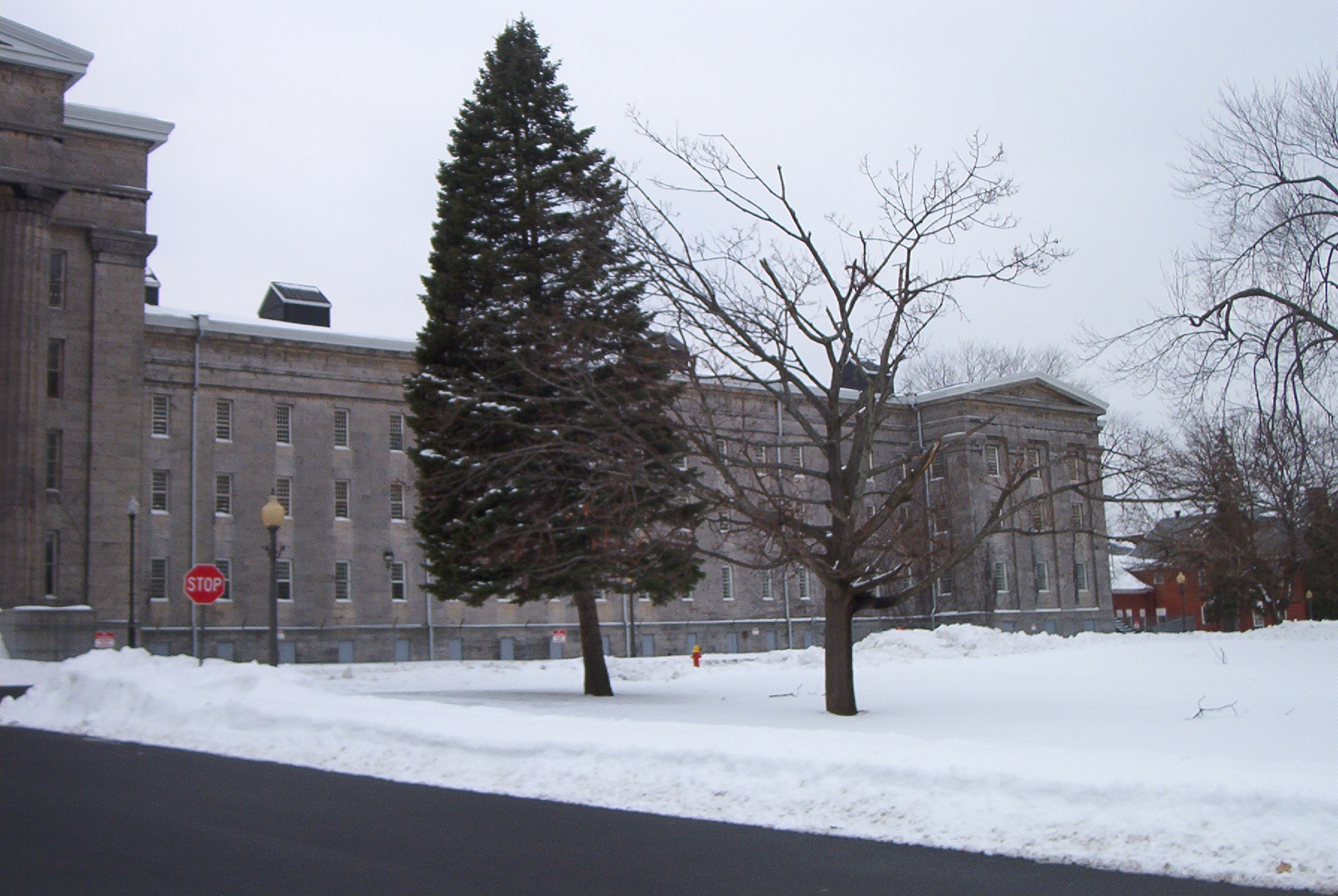
Right side (West end) of Main Building

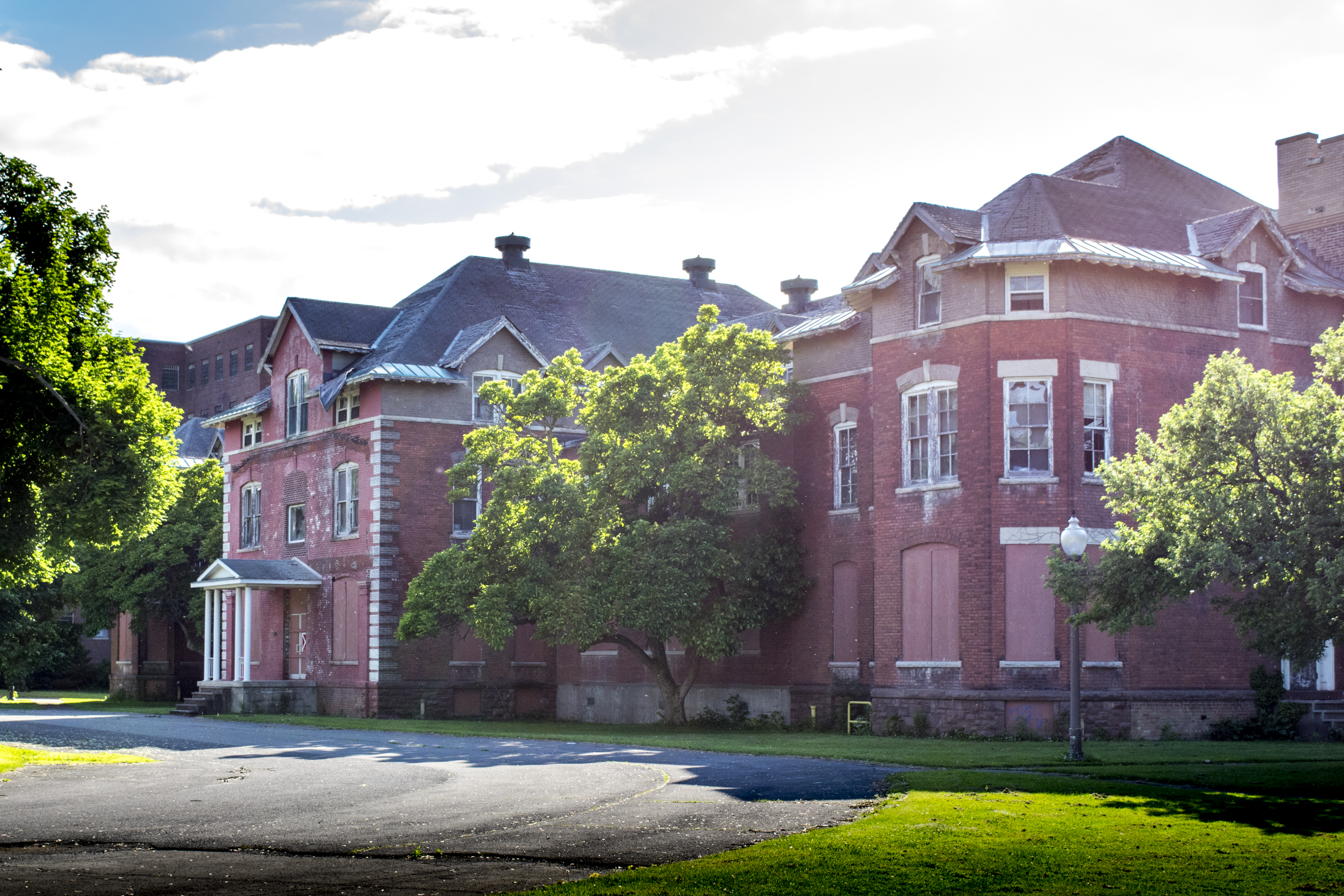
Front of the Utica Psychiatric Center Doctors House

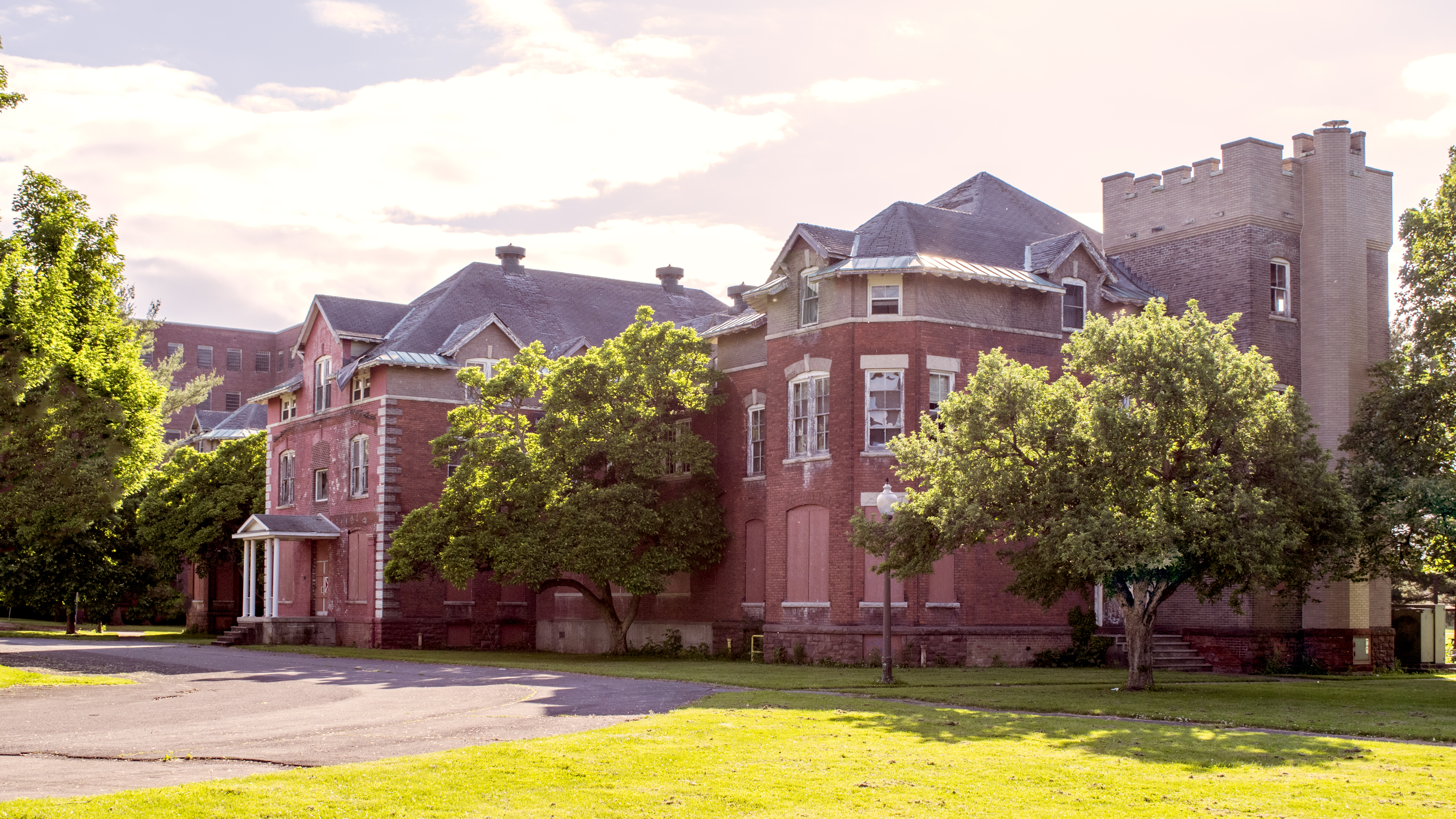
Front view of the Utica Psychiatric Center Doctors House.

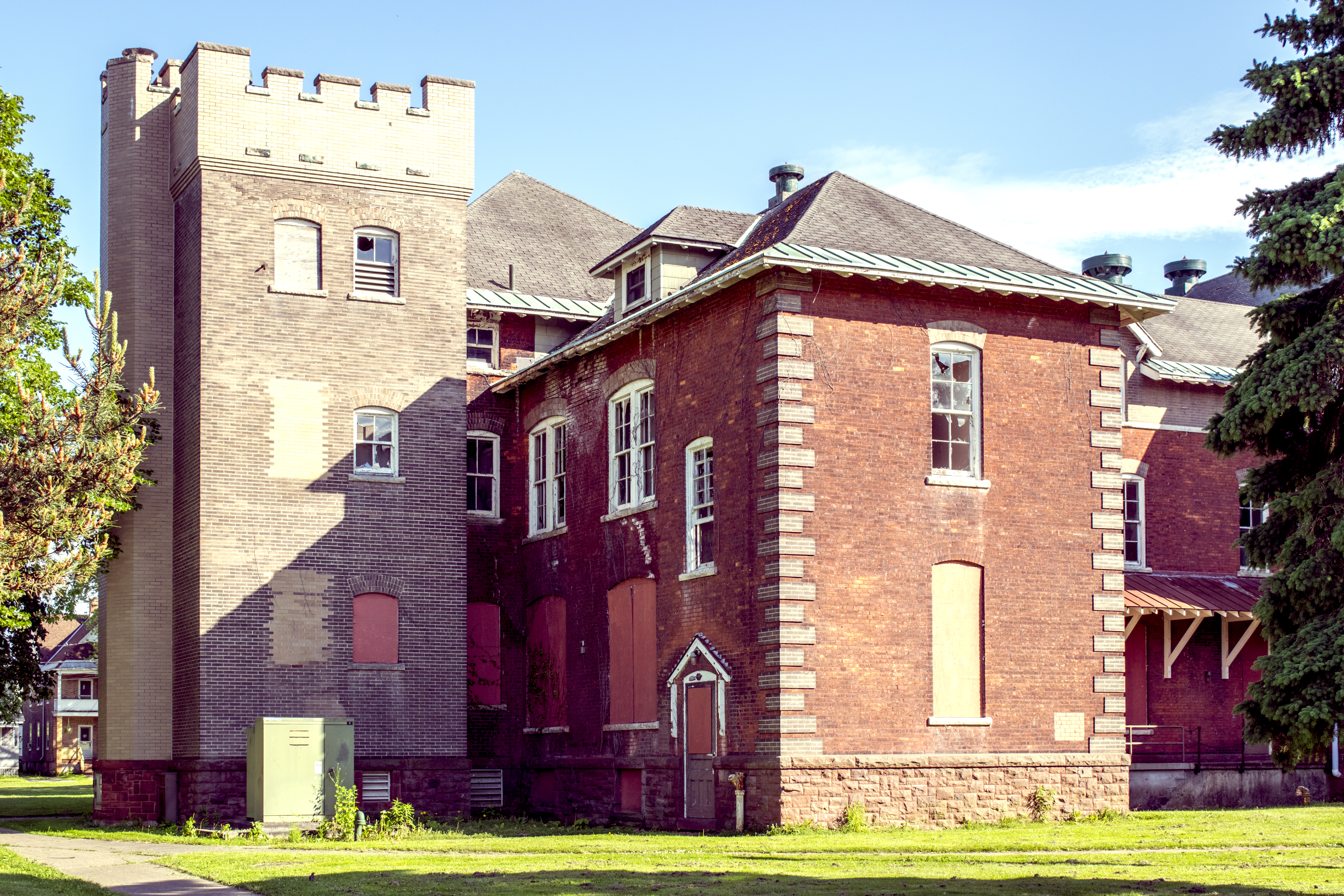
Utica Psychiatric Center Doctors House - Rear Right

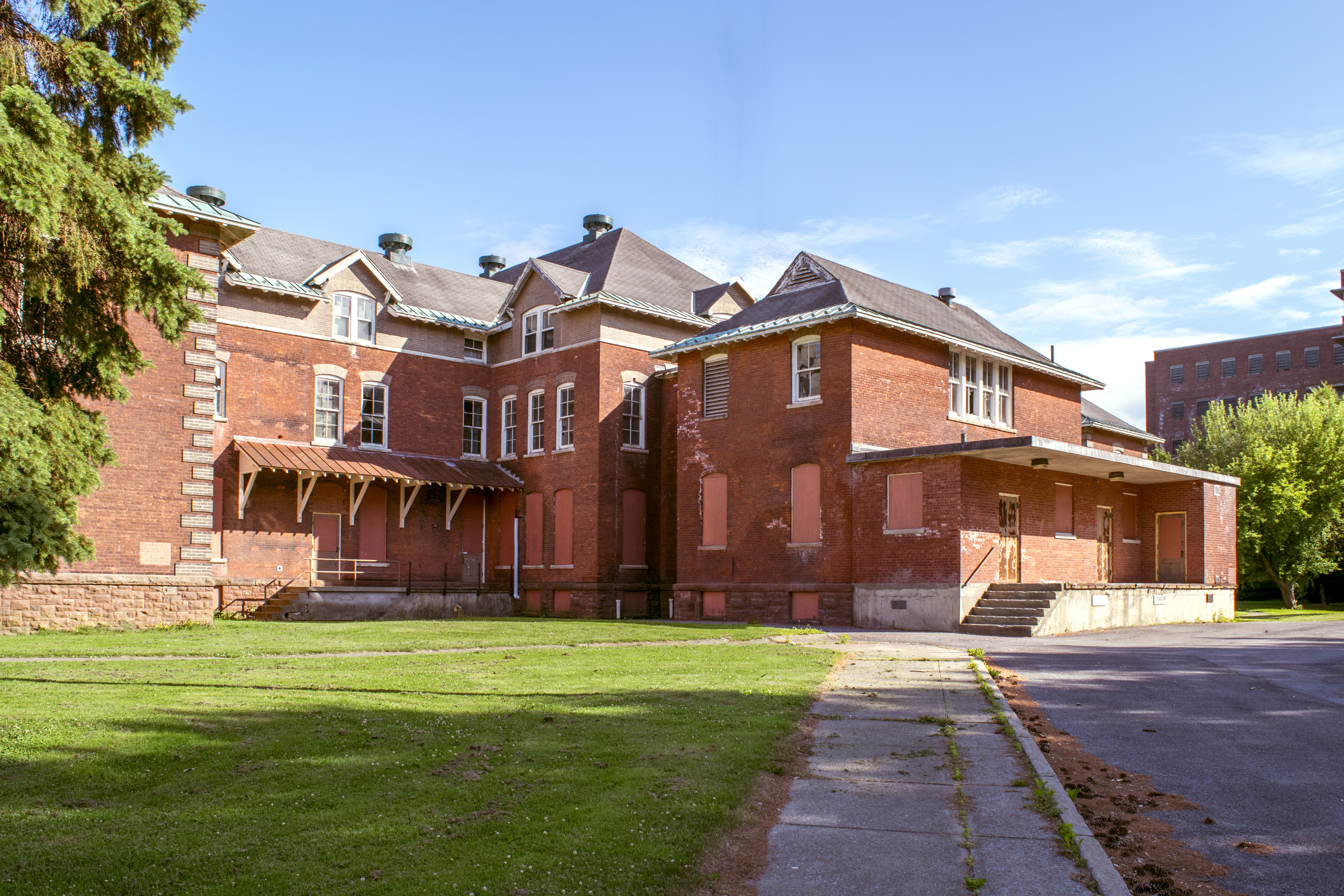
The rear of the Utica Psychiatric Center Doctors House.

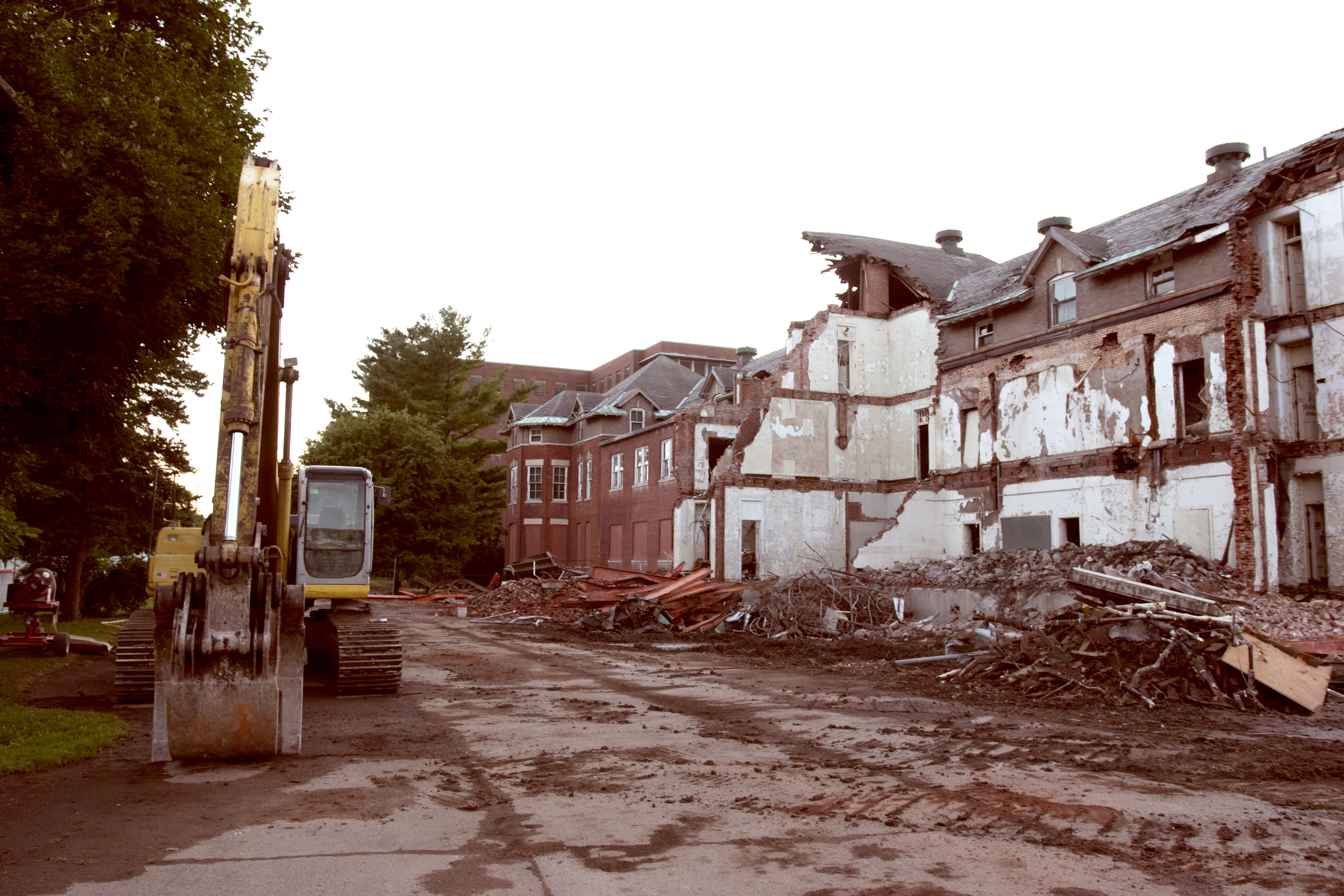
Utica Psychiatric Center Doctors House being demolished during the summer of 2015.
