= A Secret Institution =

19th-century American autobiography

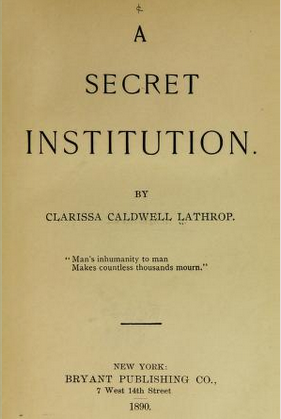
- Author: Clarissa Caldwell Lathrop
- Language: English
- Genre: autobiography
- Publisher: Bryant Publishing Co.
- Publication date: 1890
- Publication place: United States
- Media type: Print (Hardback)
- Pages: 339
- ISBN: 9333111468

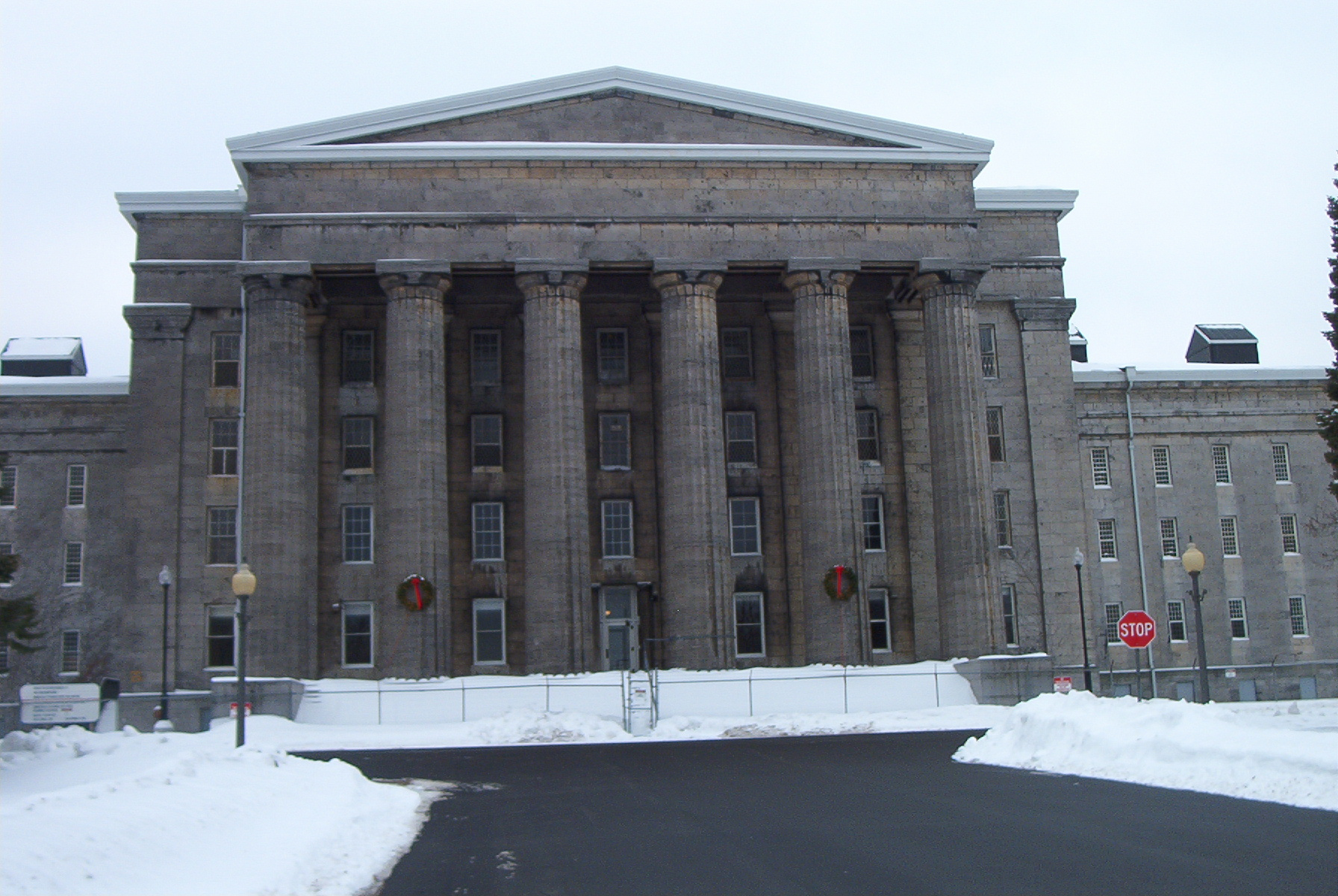
Utica Lunatic Asylum, opened in 1843, photographed in 2007

A Secret Institution, a 19th-century woman's lunatic asylum narrative, is the autobiography of Clarissa Caldwell Lathrop. Published in 1890 after she had regained her freedom, it details Lathrop's institutionalization at Utica Lunatic Asylum for voicing suspicions that someone was trying to poison her. Written novelistically, book reviews of the time suggested that it was poorly written and fell short of its object, while 21st-century reviewers praise the exposing of 19th-century mental institutions, which confined outspoken women.

A Secret Institution (New York: Bryant Publishing Co.) has the external appearance of a novel, but was intended as a statement of facts concerning the way things were managed in the Utica Lunatic Asylum. The author, Clarissa Caldwell Lathrop, said that in 1880, at the instance of her mother and sister, she was confined in that establishment and remained there for two years, although she was confident of her sanity during that entire period. She was finally brought out on a writ of habeas corpus applied for by James Bailey Silkman. She stated that, like herself, he had been incarcerated at Utica asylum under a false charge of lunacy, trumped up by relatives, and that on regaining his freedom, he published an announcement that he would "help any sane person out of an asylum who would communicate with him, giving his office address at New York City." After Lathrop found a way to notify Silkman, he applied for a writ, on which she was taken to Hudson River State Hospital at Poughkeepsie, where her sanity was established and she was freed by Judge George G. Barnard.

== Criticism ==
The Catholic World book review of 1891 commented that:

Lathrop described some horrible stories, which may or may not be true, concerning atrocities practised upon herself, and known by her to have been inflicted upon others equally helpless. Her narrative was written in a way which was strongly suggestive of long standing delusions in her own mind. We suppose that the temptation to put away from home such a person as she describes herself to have been, especially when it can be done at the expense of the general public, may now and then be overpoweringly strong in the case of relatives whose purses are not long and whose natural affections are not strong. Miss Clarissa, with her singular whims about a married lover, and her suspicions of being poisoned by his divorced wife, must have been a tolerably uncomfortable person to have about. But she was harmless, and that her delusions were such as to make her a proper denizen of a madhouse for an indefinite time at the public expense is palpably untrue. If every one of us who has "a bee in his bonnet" were to be locked up, how empty the streets would be! She says that county patients, such as she was, form by far the most reliable source of income for the institution, and that county commitments are apt to be "preferred for sane people who are to be confined in the Utica Asylum indefinitely. The advantage is this: What is called a 'pay patient' can be taken out of an asylum at any time his friends see fit to do so, whether in accordance with the doctor's permission or not, whereas a county patient is entirely at the mercy of the superintendent as to the length of time he may choose to detain him, as the county allows him to keep a patient two years, a privilege which a mercenary superintendent like Dr. Grey was able to appreciate and take care not to lose sight of, for the county is sure pay, and the greater the number of patients the larger the revenue to the asylum; and any relative or friend wishing to remove a wife, child, or ward, believing them to be wrongfully detained, must have recourse to a writ of habeas corpus, or be forced to give bonds for the safe-keeping of the patient before allowed to remove him from the superintendent's custody, a fact which often prevented patients from being removed when their friends were most anxious to do so, believing them perfectly cured, and detrimental to their interests to remain longer, and also desiring to protect the patient from cruelties to which they might be subjected."

The Belford's Magazine book review of 1891 commented that,

... this book, although possibly written with the best intention, must, for various reasons, be taken cum grano ("with a grain of salt"). The authoress, who assumes to be a person of education, without giving us any evidence of the latter, assails in a very high-banded way one of the most important institutions in this State—the Insane Asylum at Utica—and takes its management to task upon issues which do not seem to be well-founded, although they purport to be based upon the personal experience of the writer.

Miss Lathrop, who is a native of Rochester, New York, and the daughter of Gen. Win. E. Lathrop, graduated at seventeen from some educational establishment, apparently without a name. Her ambition is to become a public teacher and a member of a Shakespeare Club. This ambition she gratifies, but, seemingly, with no flattering results. The soft pulp of her heart, however, being sensitive to the slightest touch of the finger of Cupid, she becomes doeply enamoured of a certain Mr. Zell, and is engaged to him; but, for some reason, the engagement is broken off, and she sees no more of her fickle swain, until she gets an accidental glimpse of him in a church, and subsequently, in the impenetrable disguise of a "face pitted by small-pox," after he had married and become a widower, and had, besides, divorced another wife—one Miss Hamlo, it was thought. Miss Lathrop and this latter person, having been thrown into boarding-house relations, our authoress began to entertain the idea that some one was attempting to poison her, and, becoming suspicious of Miss Hamlo, she began to retail those suspicions so widely and pertinaciously that all her friends and family set her down as of unsound mind, and commenced to speak of sending her to an asylum. Of their intention in this relation she had become thoroughly aware, and stood hourly in dread of its consummation. And it is just here where she unconsciously bears witness against herself, and in favor of the correctness of their impression; for when, without any adequate explanation, she was hurried into a carriage with two policemen, and was driven to the depot to take the train for Utica, she did not appear to have any idea of the seriousness of the situation, or to view with any suspicion the presence of the doctor who accompanied her on the cars. In addition, she did not seem to comprehend the significance of the great, long stone building into which she was ushered on their arrival at her destination, until she had already entered it.

Here, in view of what had been previously communicated to her, was positive evidence of her unsound state of mind. She did not appear to entertain any sense of her danger, although the probability of her being sent to some institution had been frequently indicated to her in the plainest possible manner. Besides, there seemed to be no motive whatever for her incarceration, beyond the one alleged. She was treated with consideration during her restraint; and all her friends and family, including her mother and sisters, concurred in the justness of the certificate of committal, signed by two responsible medical men. That her insanity was not demonstrative is no evidence that it did not exist. Frequently, seemingly unobtrusive monomaniacs are very cunning and troublesome, and of this she must have made Dr. Grey and the other medical attendants at the asylum thoroughly aware. As she was not a dangerous inmate, but, on the contrary, perfectly harmless, and in some measure sane, her release was to be expected, as the two-years' term of incarceration for such patients in the asylum was about to close. Her conduct subsequently, however, in writing to this Mr. Zell and clinging to him like a burr, when he evidently did not desire to continue his acquaintance with her, as well as other phases of her behavior, would seem to indicate that she was liberated too soon.

This book, which is very badly written, will fall far short of its object. Nor will its bald egotism, which was to be expected, pass unnoticed, especially where the authoress gives us to understand that her personal charms are most captivating.
