= Amariah Brigham =

American psychiatrist

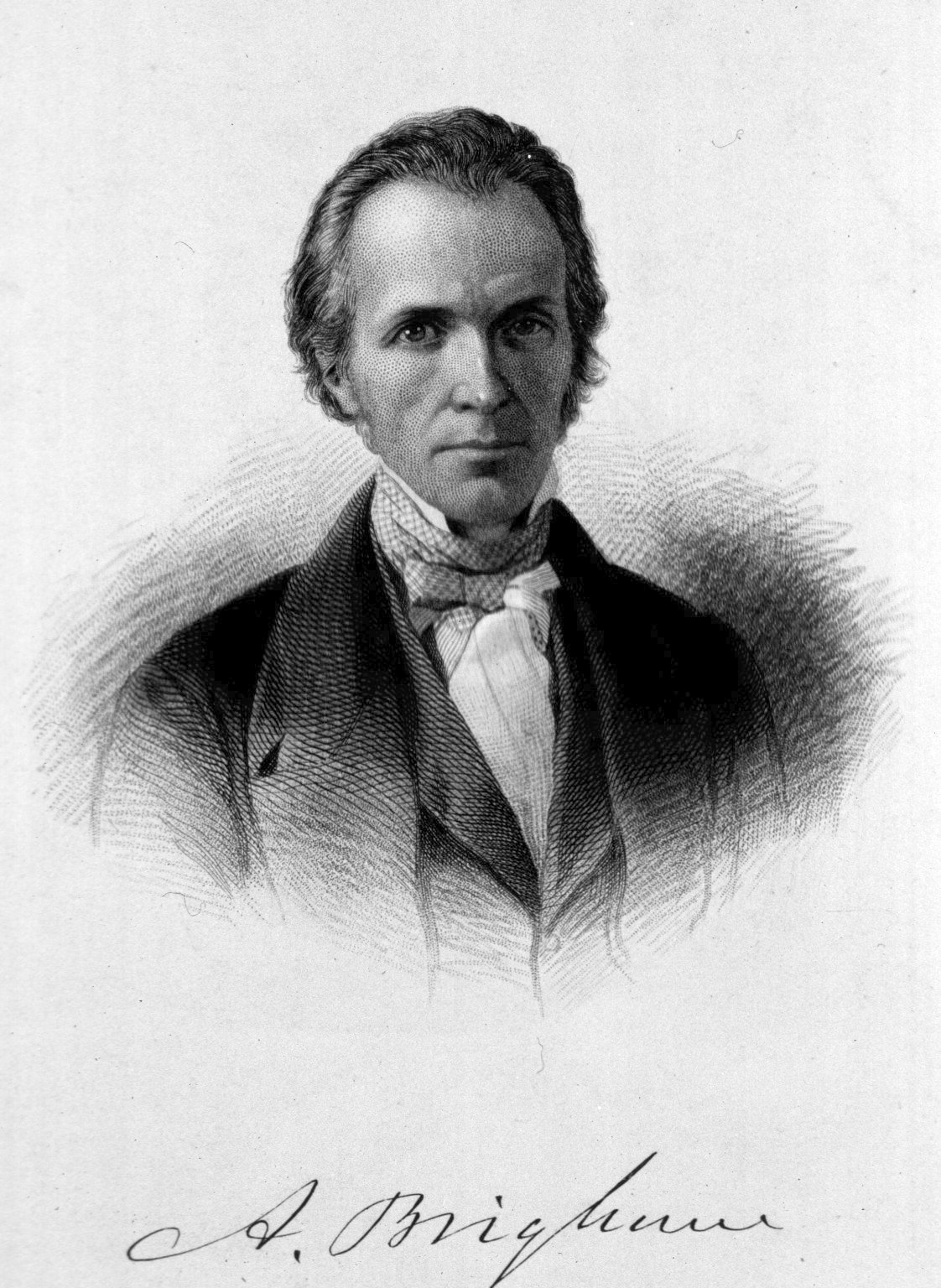
Amariah Brigham, M.D. (From "Images from the History of Medicine," National Library of Medicine.

Amariah Brigham (December 26, 1798, in New Marlborough, Massachusetts – September 8, 1849, in Utica, New York) was an American psychiatrist and, in 1844, one of the founding members of the Association of Medical Superintendents of American Institutions for the Insane, which eventually became the American Psychiatric Association. While serving as the first director of the Utica Psychiatric Center, Brigham launched and became the first editor of the Association's official journal, The American Journal of Insanity (now called The American Journal of Psychiatry).

== Selected works ==
- Remarks on the influence of mental cultivation and mental excitement upon health (2d ed., Boston, 1833)
- Observations on the Influence of Religion upon the Health and Physical Welfare of Mankind. Facsimile ed., 1973, 2 vols. in 1, Scholars' Facsimiles & Reprints, ISBN 978-0-8201-1125-4.
- A treatise on epidemic cholera : including an historical account of its origin and progress, to the present period (1832)
- An inquiry into diseases and functions of the brain, spinal cord and nerves (1840)

== Sources ==
- The Encyclopedia Americana, Volume 4
