= John P. Gray (psychiatrist) =

American psychiatrist

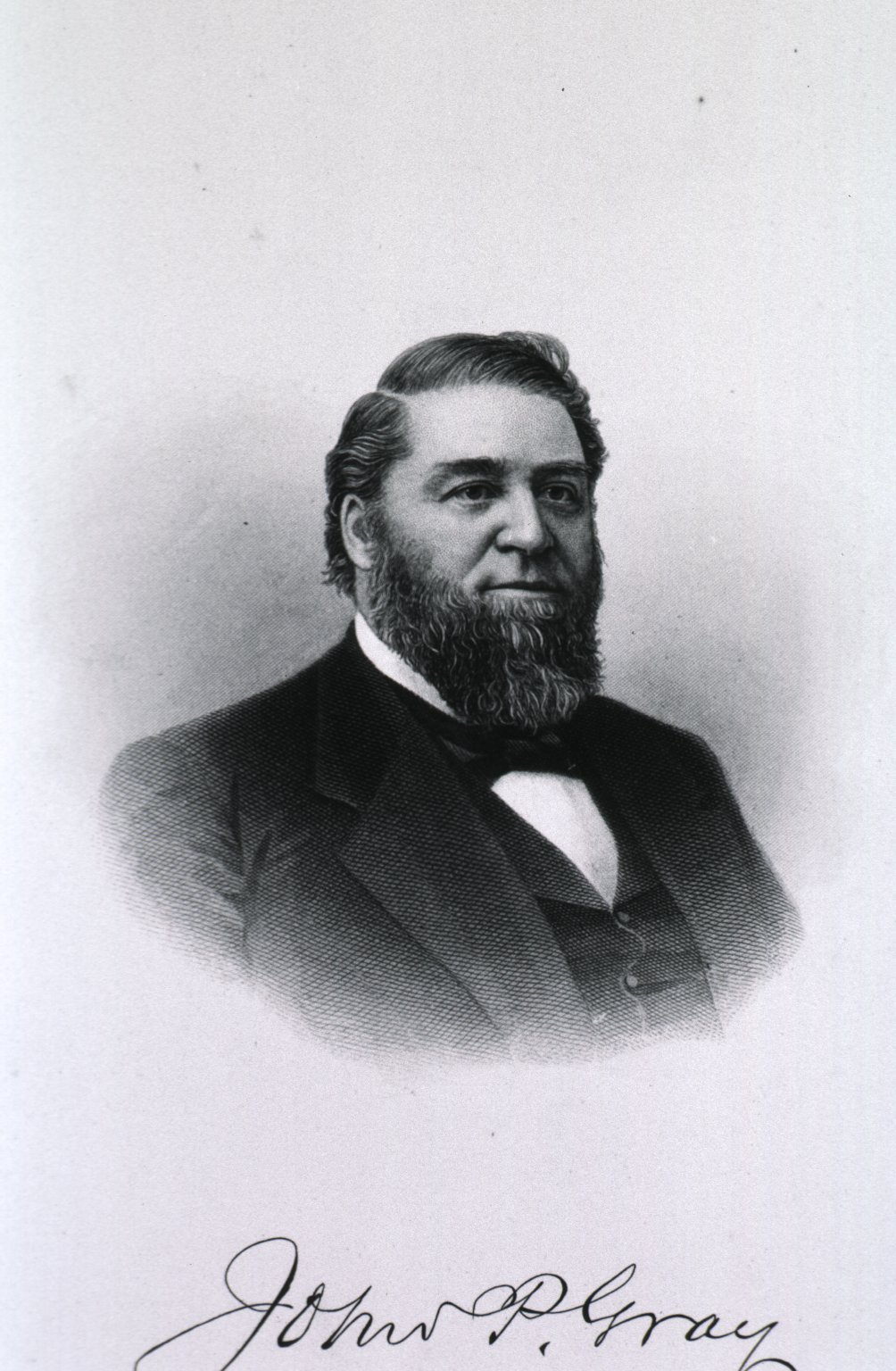
- John P. Gray circa 1880
- Born: August 6, 1825; Halfmoon Township (Pennsylvania)
- Died: November 29, 1886 (aged 61); Utica, New York
- Citizenship: American
- Education: Dickinson College; University of Pennsylvania School of Medicine

John Perdue Gray (August 6, 1825, Halfmoon Township (Pennsylvania) - November 29, 1886, Utica, New York) was an American psychiatrist at the forefront of biological psychiatric theory during the 19th century.

He attended Dickinson College, then the University of Pennsylvania School of Medicine, where he received his medical diploma in 1848., He spent one year of further studies in Europe, then as a resident at Blockley Asylum in Philadelphia. In 1850, Gray worked at the Utica Psychiatric Center in New York and was superintendent from 1854 until his death in 1886. He was also the editor of the American Journal of Insanity, the precursor to the American Journal of Psychiatry.

Gray believed that insanity was always due to physical causes and that the mentally ill should be treated as physically ill. He explained that mental illness can be affected by physical factors relating to an individual. He studied three such factors, namely: diet, temperature and ventilation.

He was a psychiatric expert in the trial for the assassination of president James A. Garfield, where he testified in December 1881 that Charles Guiteau was able to stand trial. In March 1882 he was shot through the jaw by Henry Remshaw, a local man angered by Gray's testimony at the trial, while sitting in his office in Utica. Remshaw was declared insane and incarcerated at Auburn State Prison. Gray never fully regained his health and died in 1886.

== Works ==
- General Paresis, or Incomplete Progressive Paralysis. Albany, NY: Van Benthuysen, 1866.
- Insanity, its Dependence on Physical Disease. Utica, NY: Roberts, 1871.
- Insanity: its Frequency and Some of its Preventable Causes. Utica, NY, 1886.
- The United States vs. Charles J. Guiteau, Indicted for Murder of James A. Garfield, Twentieth President of the United States. Opinion of ... on the Sanity of the Prisoner. Washington, 1882.
