= The American Journal of Psychiatry =

American Journal of Psychiatry
- Discipline: Psychiatry
- Language: English
- Edited by: Ned H. Kalin

Publication details
- Former name: American Journal of Insanity
- History: 1844–present
- Publisher: American Psychiatric Association (United States)
- Frequency: Monthly
- Impact factor: 18.112 (2020)

Standard abbreviations
- ISO 4: Am. J. Psychiatry

Indexing
- CODEN: AJPSAO
- ISSN: 0002-953X (print); 1535-7228 (web)
- LCCN: 22024537
- OCLC no.: 1480183

Links
- Journal homepage; Current issue; Online archive of all issues

The American Journal of Psychiatry is a monthly peer-reviewed medical journal covering all aspects of psychiatry, and is the official journal of the American Psychiatric Association. The first volume was issued in 1844, at which time it was known as the American Journal of Insanity. The title changed to the current form with the July issue of 1943.

According to the Journal Citation Reports, the journal has a 2020 impact factor of 18.112.

== Ethical concerns ==
Several complaints, including legal cases, have charged The American Journal of Psychiatry with being complicit in pharmaceutical industry corruption of clinical trial results. In a Department of Justice case against Forest Pharmaceuticals, Forest pleaded guilty to the charges of misbranding the drug Celexa (citalopram). The Complaint in Intervention clearly identifies a 2004 ghostwritten article published in The American Journal of Psychiatry in the names of Wagner et al. as a part of this illegal marketing of Celexa for pediatric depression.

== See also ==
- List of psychiatry journals
