= Governor of Minnesota =

Head of government of the U.S. state of Minnesota

- Great Seal of the State of Minnesota

- Flag of Minnesota

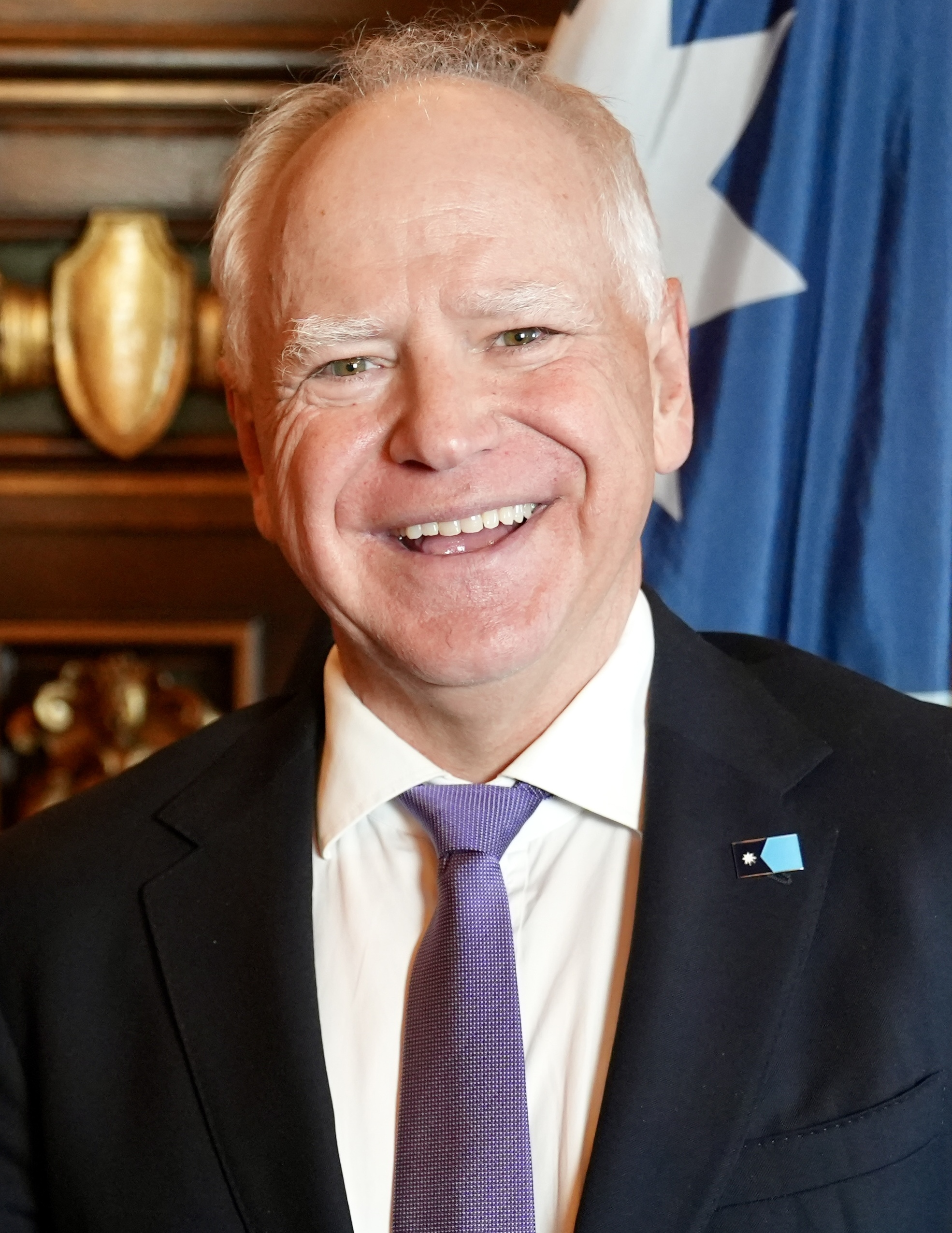
- Incumbent; Tim Walz since January 7, 2019
- Government of Minnesota
- Style: The Honorable
- Residence: Minnesota Governor's Residence
- Term length: Four years, no term limit
- Inaugural holder: Henry H. Sibley
- Formation: May 24, 1858
- Succession: Line of succession
- Deputy: Lieutenant Governor of Minnesota
- Salary: $200,000
- Website: Official website

The governor of Minnesota is the head of government of the state of Minnesota, leading the state's executive branch. Forty people have been governor of Minnesota, and previously three of Minnesota Territory. Alexander Ramsey, the first territorial governor, also served as state governor several years later. State governors are elected to office by popular vote; territorial governors were appointed to the office by the United States president. The current governor of Minnesota is Tim Walz of the Democratic-Farmer-Labor Party (DFL), affiliated with the Democratic Party.

== Powers and qualifications ==
Similar to the U.S. president, the governor has veto power over bills passed by the Minnesota State Legislature. As in most states, but unlike the U.S. president, the governor can also make line-item vetoes, where specific provisions in bills can be stripped out while allowing the overall bill to be signed into law.

The governor of Minnesota must be 25 years old upon assuming office, and must have been a Minnesota resident for one year before the election.

Since a 1958 amendment (Note: effective in 1962) to the Minnesota Constitution, governors are elected to four-year terms, with no limits on the number of terms they may serve.

== Cabinet ==
The governor has a cabinet consisting of the leaders of various state departments. The governor appoints these department heads, who, other than the head of the Department of Military Affairs and the chairs of the Metropolitan Council and the Metropolitan Sports Facilities Commission, are called commissioners. Cabinet members include:

Cabinet
Office	Incumbent	Term began
Commissioner of Administration	Tamar Gronvall	Oct. 9, 2023
Commissioner of Agriculture	Thom Petersen	Jan. 7, 2019
Commissioner of Children, Youth and Families	Mary Otto	March 2026
Commissioner of Commerce	Grace Arnold	Sept. 11, 2020
Commissioner of Corrections	Paul Schnell	Jan. 7, 2019
Commissioner of Education	Willie Jett	Jan. 2, 2023
Commissioner of Employment and Economic Development	Matt Varilek	June 20, 2023
Commissioner of Health	Brooke Cunningham	Jan. 2, 2023
Commissioner of the Minnesota Office of Higher Education	Dennis Olsen	Jan. 7, 2019
Commissioner of Minnesota Housing Finance Agency	Jennifer Lemaile Ho	Jan. 7, 2019
Commissioner of Human Rights	Rebecca Lucero	Jan. 7, 2019
Commissioner of Human Services	Shireen Gandhi (interim)	Feb. 2, 2025
Commissioner of the Iron Range Resources and Rehabilitation Board	Ida Rukavina	Jan. 2, 2023
Commissioner and Chief Information Officer of MN.IT Services	Tarek Tomes	April 16, 2019
Commissioner of Labor and Industry	Nicole Blissenbach	Jan. 2, 2023
Commissioner of Management and Budget	Erin Campbell	Aug.15, 2023
Commissioner of Minnesota Bureau of Mediation Services	Johnny Villareal	Dec. 22, 2021
Chairperson of the Metropolitan Council	Robin Hutchenson	Dec. 1, 2025
Adjutant General	Maj. Gen. Shawn P. Manke	Aug. 12, 2020
Commissioner of Natural Resources	Sarah Strommen	Jan. 7, 2019
Commissioner of the Minnesota Pollution Control Agency	Katrina Kessler	Nov. 1, 2021
Commissioner of Public Safety	Bob Jacobson	Jan. 2, 2023
Commissioner of Revenue	Paul Marquart	Jan. 2, 2023
Commissioner of Transportation	Nancy Daubenberger	Jan. 7, 2019
Commissioner of Veterans Affairs	Brad Lindsay	Sept. 23, 2023

== Residence ==
The Minnesota Governor's Residence is located in Saint Paul, at 1006 Summit Avenue.

== Succession ==
The line of succession for the Governor is established by Article V, Section 5 of the Minnesota Constitution and Minnesota Statute 4.06.

== Traditions ==
=== Minnesota Governor's Fishing Opener ===
The Minnesota Governor's Fishing Opener is a tradition that dates back to 1948. The event was designed to promote the development of Minnesota's recreation industry. The Governor goes to a selected lake in Minnesota to fish on the opening weekend of the fishing season.

== Timeline ==
Timeline of Minnesota governors

== See also ==
- List of governors of Minnesota
- List of Minnesota gubernatorial elections
- List of lieutenant governors of Minnesota
- Minnesota Secretary of State
- Minnesota Attorney General
- Minnesota State Auditor
- Minnesota State Treasurer (office abolished January 6, 2003)
- Politics of Minnesota
