= Minnesota Direct Care and Treatment =

Executive agency in Minnesota, US

Direct Care and Treatment
Agency overview
- Headquarters: 3200 Labore Road, Suite 104 Vadnais Heights, MN 55110
- Employees: 5000 (2025)
- Annual budget: $736 million
- Agency executive: Marshall Smith, CEO
- Website: mn.gov/dct/

Minnesota Direct Care and Treatment (DCT) is a state agency that provides behavioral health care services to people with serious mental illness, substance use disorders, and some developmental/intellectual disabilities. The agency has about 150 sites across Minnesota and serves 12,000+ people each year. Many are civilly committed and classified by the court as mentally ill, mentally ill and dangerous, chemically dependent, developmentally disabled, a sexually dangerous persons, and/or having a sexual psychopathic personality.

DCT was established as its own agency in 2025 after separating from the Department of Human Services.

== History ==
Direct Care and Treatment traces its history to the founding of the first state hospital in St Peter, MN, at the same site as the current St Peter Regional Treatment Center and St. Peter State Hospital Museum. After that Minnesota grew its state hospital system to include care for those with mental illness, substance abuse issues, and developmental or intellectual disabilities.

Since the 1970s, attempts to reduce institutionalization have meant a shift from large state operated hospitals to smaller group homes in communities. This combined with improved mental health treatments resulted in a large reduction in the number of state hospitals.

Status of state hospitals
Name	Opened	Closed	Notes
Anoka State Hospital	1900	—N/a	In operation
Brainerd State Hospital	1958	—N/a	Still owned, but not operated by DCT
Cambridge State Hospital	1925	1997	
Faribault State School and Hospital	1879	1998	
Fergus Falls State Hospital	1890	2004	
Hastings State Hospital	1900	1978	
Rochester State Hospital	1879	1982	
St Peter State Hospital	1866	—N/a	In operation
Willmar State Hospital	1912	2008	

== Divisions ==
=== Mental Health and Substance Abuse ===
Mental Health and Substance Abuse (MHSATS) are inpatient hospitals for short term care of patients with severe mental health issues or substance abuse issues. MHSATS facilities are nationally accredited hospitals. In 2025 MHSATS had a budget of $186 Million and employed 1300 employees.

MHSATS operates Anoka Metro Regional Treatment, a 96 bed hospital in Anoka, Minnesota that serves the Twin Cities metro area, as well as six Community Behavioral Health Hospitals with 16 beds each in Alexandria, Annandale, Baxter, Bemidji, Fergus Falls, and Rochester. MHSATS also operates the Child and Adolescent Behavioral Health Hospital in Willmar, Minnesota, Community Addiction Recovery Enterprise (CARE) program in other sites around the state and the Minnesota Specialty Health System, in Wadena and Willmar.

=== Minnesota Sex Offender Program ===
The Minnesota Sex Offender Program operates mostly out of two sites in Moose Lake, Minnesota and sharing a campus with Forensic Services at St Peter Regional Treatment Center. In 2025, it had a budget of $126 Million and employed 965 employees. As of October 2025, MSOP had 758 clients held in their facilities.

The program houses over 700 people who have been involuntarily committed for being deemed "sexually dangerous persons" or "sexual psychopathic personalities". By the time they enter MSOP, they have served the sentence for any crime they have committed and the civil commitment is indefinite. The first provisional discharge was in 2012. As of October 2025, in the history of the program 34 clients had been discharged.

=== Forensic Services ===
Forensic Services evaluates and treats patients who have been civilly committed by a Minnesota court after being charged with a serious crime and found not competent to stand trial or not guilty by reason of mental illness or cognitive impairment. In 2025, Forensic Services had a budget of $152 Million and 1000 employees.

=== Community Based Services ===
Community Based Services (CBS) provides residential, vocational, and crisis services for patients with developmental disabilities. They operate about 100 group homes as well as a number of vocational and transition sites around the state to support those with developmental disabilities and co-occurring conditions. In 2025, their budget was $195 million per year and they employed 1500 workers.

=== Outpatient Services ===
DCT also provides dental services, primary care, and outpatient psychiatric care for patients and clients who cannot find care elsewhere. In 2025, this division had a budget of $7.6 Million and employed 116 employees.

=== Operations Support ===
The administrative arm of DCT that supports HR, Finance, Legal, and Compliance for the rest of DCT. In 2025, its budget was $67.3 million and it had 270 employees.
