= First Unitarian Congregation of Toronto =

- First Unitarian Congregation of Toronto
- 43°41′28″N 79°26′23″W
- Location: Toronto
- Country: Canada
- Denomination: Canadian Unitarian Council
- Website: www.firstunitariantoronto.org

History
- Founded: 1845

Architecture
- Functional status: Active
- Completed: 2025

First Unitarian Congregation of Toronto is a Unitarian Universalist (UU) congregation in Toronto, Ontario, Canada. It is affiliated with the Canadian Unitarian Council. It is the largest of six UU congregations and fellowships in the Greater Toronto Area.

The congregation draws members from across the city. Founded in 1845, it is governed by a nine-member volunteer Board of Directors charged with focusing on policies relating to the overall vision, goals and health of the congregation.

There are five part-time staff members and a large roster of volunteers. A religious education program for children, youth and adults is led by the Director of Lifespan Religious Education.

== Ministers ==
- Rev. Alex Jensen, Lead Minister
- Rev. Victoria Ingram, Pastoral Minister
- Captain Rev. Nicole McKay, Affiliated Community Minister

== History ==
The First Unitarian Congregation of Toronto was established in 1845 by 15 British and Irish immigrants. Among the first members were Joseph Workman, (who is considered the founder of the modern profession of psychiatry in Canada), and his brother, Benjamin Workman.

Throughout the nineteenth century the congregation grew steadily. In 1854 a church was built at 216 Jarvis Street and remained there until 1949 when the congregation relocated to 175 St. Clair Avenue West. Over the years, numerous prominent Torontonians attended First Unitarian, including the Workman brothers; Dr. Emily Stowe, Canada’s first female physician; painters Arthur Lismer (one of the Group of Seven) and Fred Steiger; Dr. Luigi von Kunits, the Toronto Symphony’s first conductor; Royal Conservatory of Music founder Edward Fisher; Bank of Canada Governor James Coyne; Toronto Mayor William Dennison and several other politicians.

Reverend William Jenkins, who arrived in 1943, supported positioning the church as a social hub. His sermons were regularly featured on radio and in newspapers. In 1960, the Reverend John Hanly Morgan took over as minister, and during his 14 years in the pulpit, the congregation’s membership increased to almost 900 individuals, prompting the formation of sister congregations in Peel and Don Heights. Morgan took strong left-of-centre positions politically, encouraging the congregation to be socially active in causes such as civil rights in the United States, nuclear disarmament, and opposition to US military intervention in Vietnam.

After Morgan’s departure in 1973 until the late 1980s, the church experienced a decline in membership. From 1989 to 2005 it revived under the leadership of co-ministers (and spouses) Donna and Mark Morrison-Reed,who emphasized spiritual diversity and were strong supporters of both anti-racism initiatives and same-sex marriage.

Reverend Shawn Newton (now Gauthier), First’s minister between 2007 and 2023, expanded the work of inclusiveness and connectedness as the congregation grew more cohesive. Music, pastoral care, and religious education programming grew robust, and Reverend Newton took an active part in interfaith dialogue in the city.

In 2025, First Unitarian moved to its current location at 473 Oakwood Avenue.

== Building ==
In 2021, following several years of discussion and debate, First Unitarian decided to sell its St. Clair West building, which it had occupied since 1951. The congregation sought a new home more suited to the current congregation’s needs for accessibility and other important features, including the flexibility to function as a meeting space for local community groups.

The site chosen at 473 Oakwood Avenue fit the bill. It was a former postal sorting station, built in the 1960s and renovated in the 2000s to become a rental property. Over the next four years, First Unitarian undertook extensive renovations, designed by LGA Architectural Partners. Services were held there for the first time in the fall of 2025.

Stained glass windows, commissioned and installed in 1995 for the St Clair West location and set into a soaring tower, was a prominent feature of the former building. The work is entitled Radiance, Reflection, Revelation by artist Sarah Hall. It was later nominated for the Ontario Arts Council's Jean Chalmers Award as the single largest commission for a stained glass work in the Toronto area. These windows were moved to 473 Oakwood, reconfigured and integrated into the congregation’s new home.

== Members ==
One of the prominent founding members was Joseph Workman, known as the "Father of Canadian Psychiatry". Other notable members include:

- Arthur Lismer, a painter, part of the Group of Seven
- Sir Francis Hincks, politician
- Emily Stowe, the first female doctor to practise in Canada
- William Dennison, the mayor of Toronto
- Donald Macdonald, leader of the Ontario CCF and then the Ontario New Democratic Party
- Michael Cassidy, leader of the Ontario New Democratic Party.
