= Minnesota Department of Children, Youth and Families =

Cabinet-level agency in Minnesota

Minnesota Department of Children, Youth, and Families
Agency overview
- Formed: 2024
- Jurisdiction: Minnesota
- Headquarters: 106 Water Street, Saint Paul, Minnesota
- Employees: 400
- Agency executive: Mary Otto, Commissioner
- Parent agency: State of Minnesota
- Website: Official website

The Minnesota Department of Children, Youth, and Families (DCYF) is a cabinet-level agency in the state of Minnesota. Established in 2024, the department has around 400 employees.

== Background ==
The Minnesota Department of Children, Youth, and Families was launched in July 2024, merging functions from the departments of Human Services, Education, Public Safety and the Health. The department was authorized in the end of the 2023 legislative session. The bill, proposed by Governor Tim Walz, was authored by Melissa Wiklund in the Senate and Dave Pinto in the House.

In May 2024, Walz appointed Tikki Brown as the first department chair. The department officially launched operations in July 2024. In 2026, they named Mary Otto, a manager of the Tribal State Relations program, as director.
