= Joseph Workman =

Irish-Canadian psychiatrist (1805–1894)

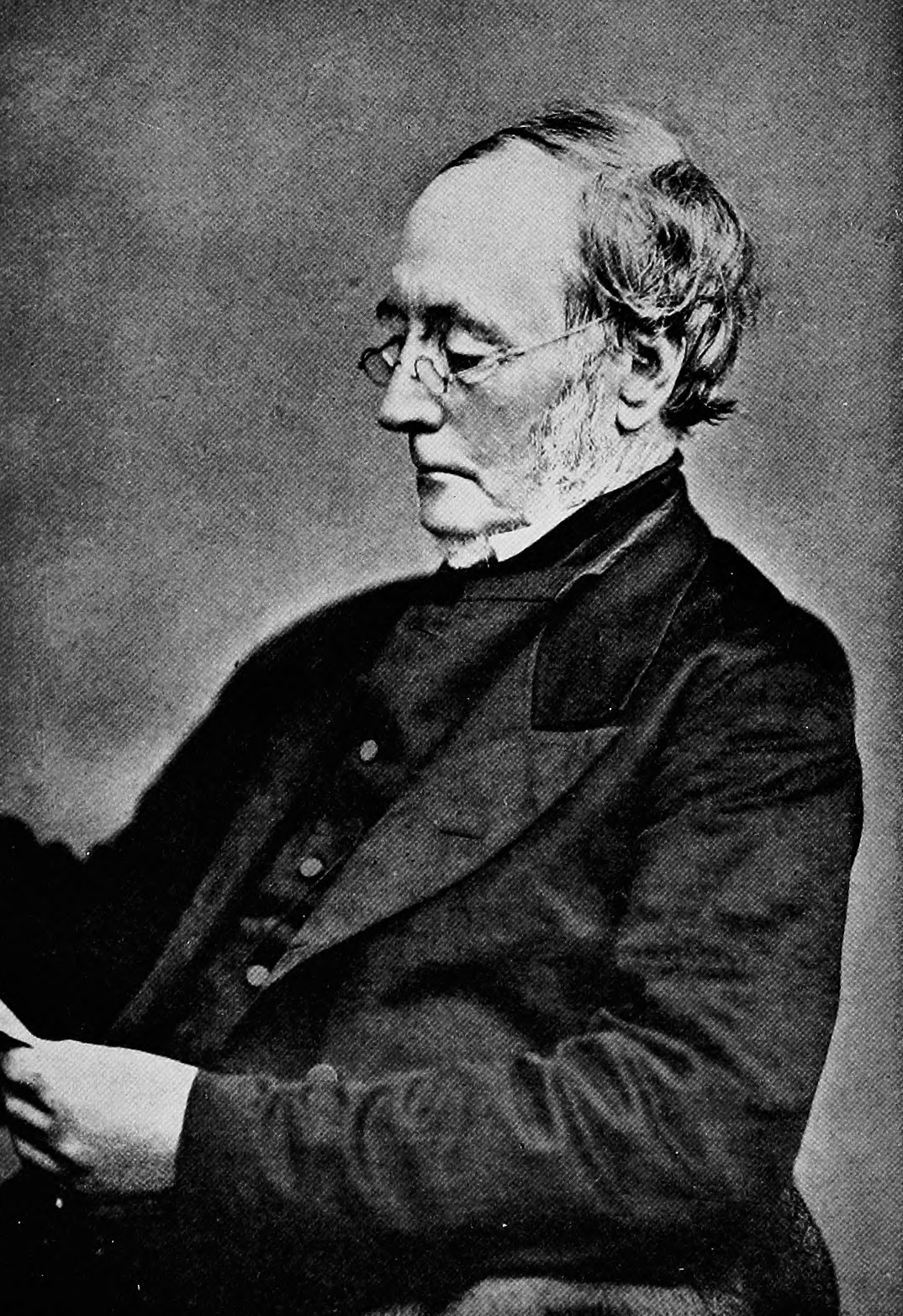
- Born: 26 May 1805; Ballymacash, near Lisburn, Ireland
- Died: 15 April 1894 (aged 89); Toronto, Ontario, Canada
- Occupations: Physician, psychiatrist
- Spouse: Elizabeth Wasnidge (m. 1835)
- Children: 10
- Relatives: Alexander Workman (brother); Thomas Workman (brother); William Workman (brother)

Academic background
- Education: McGill University (MD)

Joseph Workman (26 May 1805 – 15 April 1894) was an Irish-born Canadian physician, businessman, and politician. He worked as a medical superintendent of the Toronto Provincial Lunatic Asylum (now called the Centre for Addiction and Mental Health) from 1854 to 1875.

For changing psychiatry in Ontario during the 19th century, he has been referred to as the "Nestor of Canadian alienists", and the father of Canadian psychiatry. He served as one of the key founders and first members of the First Unitarian Congregation of Toronto. He is one of the most respected and highly regarded physicians in Canada at that time.

== Biography ==
=== Early life and family ===
Joseph Workman was born on 26 May 1805 in Ballymacash, a hamlet near Lisburn in Ireland, to a Presbyterian family. His father was Joseph Workman and his mother was Catharine Goudie. He was the fourth son out of nine children.

Workman's ancestry can be traced back to the Puritans, to a man named Reverend William Workman, who worked as a lecturer at St. Stephen's Episcopal Church in Gloucester, England. During his time, William Laud had recently assumed power as Archbishop of Canterbury and became a staunch opponent of Laud, stigmatizing his edicts during his lectures. Workman was then bought into the Court of High Commission and was convicted of heresy and was then excommunicated and imprisoned.

Reverend Workman soon died of a deep depression in 1633 following his excommunication, leaving behind his family. After his death, his children then moved to Ireland. Two of his grandsons, Joseph and Benjamin, emigrated to Pennsylvania after the American War for Independence and taught at what later became the University of Pennsylvania. After three years, the older Joseph went back to Ireland and settled in Ballymacash, where he married Goudie, a Scottish native from Ayrshire, and had nine children together.

=== Education and emigration ===
The younger Joseph was educated at a grammar school in Mullacarten near Lisburn. He was taught by his brother Benjamin, who played a primary role in his life. During their long walks from home to school, he and Benjamin would share experiences and knowledge with each other while going to the countryside. He soon went to school kept by a man named Charles Shields and then to the Academy of Benjamin Neely and Son, both located in Lisburn. By the age of 14, Benjamin had emigrated to Canada in 1819 for fertile lands, leaving his brother behind.

Meanwhile, his father taught him, alongside Alexander and William, surveying. In 1826, at the age of 21, he was appointed at a position at the Ordnance Survey in Ireland, where he spent three years. Because of poverty, the discrimination bought by the Protestant Ascendancy, and the incoming great Irish famine, the Workmans were forced to gradually move to Montreal.

In 1829, Joseph and his family moved to Quebec after Alexander moved in 1820 and Thomas, Samuel, and Matthew moved in 1827. During that time, Joseph taught English, Classics, and Mathematics at a Union School in Montreal, during which a cholera epidemic spread to Quebec. During this time, he attended medical lectures in McGill University and did clinical work in the Montreal General Hospital with Dr. John Stephenson as his private tutor. He graduated in 1835 as M.D. with a thesis on Asiatic Cholera, becoming one of the first doctors to graduate in Canada.

He actively fought against cholera. In writing his thesis against the disease, he was one of the first people to assert the disease was contagious. He and Adam Ferrie visited immigration sheds covered in sulfur as they believed it protected them from the disease, where they aided the sick. They were spared the effects of sulfur as they washed their clothes afterwards.

=== Marriage and experience in Toronto ===
On 30 May 1835, five days after he graduated, Workman married Elizabeth Wasnidge, the daughter of cutlery manufacturers. Her father Michael had died of cholera earlier that year, and her mother Ann was planning to move to Toronto to work with her eldest son, William Wasnidge, who had established a hardware business there. At the time of their marriage, Elizabeth was scheduled to leave Toronto. They had 10 children together.

He continued practicing medicine in Montreal up until the following year, when his now brother-in-law had a fatal accident while working at their hardware business. Ann needed help running the business, as their children were still adolescent at the time, resulting in Workman leaving his post and moving to Toronto to take over William's business. Elizabeth's siblings hated Workman as they felt he had taken over, so he started his own under the name of the Workman Brothers Hardware, taking Samuel with him. During this time, he wrote several articles and editorials for reformist newspapers including Francis Hincks' The Examiner.

By 1845, Workman had cofounded the Toronto Region Board of Trade, where he served as its first vice-president. Following his resignation from the business world in 1846, George Percival Ridout awarded him a gold medal as a congratulatory award for his service in the company. That same year, he opened up a medical office in the city. Under the invitation of John Rolph, he lectured on Midwifery and Diseases of Women and Children and later on Materia medica and Obstetrics in the Rolph's School of Medicine (now called the University of Toronto Faculty of Medicine) from 1846 to 1847. He also served as alderman for St. David's Ward from 1847 to 1849, when he resigned on 9 July, likely because the Royal Commission appointed him to investigate the finances of King’s College and Upper Canada College.

=== Founding of the Congregation ===
In 1845, Joseph heard from his brother Benjamin that Reverend John Cordner was interested in visiting Toronto to see if there was demand for a church there. Three days after he preached there on 6 July and discovered that there was, fifteen families met and built the First Unitarian Congregation of Toronto, with Joseph serving as its first lay preacher. He also periodically served as Secretary on its Board of Trustees for nearly ten years. After his retirement in 1854, he was replaced by his brother Benjamin.

=== Career as medical superintendent ===
In 1853, he was hired as temporary superintendent of the Toronto Provincial Lunatic Asylum (now called the Centre for Addiction and Mental Health) to fill up the vacant space left by the previous superintendent John Scott. Workman became a permanent superintendent in April 1854, following's Rolph solicitation for him to be made permanent, winning the majority vote against John Hunter Robinson, a friend of Lord Elgin.

He did not have the experience of being a psychiatrist or managing an asylum before. In 1855, he took a trip to the United States to learn psychiatry and how to run an asylum. He first attended the Medical Convention in Boston, followed by visits in the asylums of New England, such as the Worcester Lunatic Asylum in Massachusetts. In 1859, he took a trip across the Atlantic, where first visited Northern Ireland and visited the Tuke Retreat in York.

During the first years in office, Workman spent his time fixing the problems with the structure of the asylum. One incident involved a typhoid outbreak he attributed to the accumulated pollution under the basement floor, and which had been noticed earlier by the Board of Committees and the Grand Jury, who underestimated the problem. He tasked the workers with rebuilding both the ventilation and drainage systems as well as reconnecting the drainage to the main sewer. During his time at the institution, he spent time testing the idea of moral treatment and doing his own research. He had also advocated for the humane treatment of the insane, treating them with individualized medical attention and nutrition.

He also believed that insanity was a somatic disease, believing that insanity was caused by the changes of the human brain and not by psychological trauma. He connected the cause of insanity to physical conditions such as concussion. Later on in life, he commented on the "religious-emotional" type of insanity and associated religious zealotry with heightened libido and connected zealotry with masturbation and sexual diseases. He also perpetuated the view of masturbation as a major cause of insanity, speaking publicly on the dangers of masturbation to children and elders, making him one of the main perpetrators of sexual psychopathy alongside Charles Kirk Clarke and Richard Maurice Bucke.

After 1853, Superintendents could hire and fire staff, which could build skill and team-building. Building that priority, in the late 1870s, Workman, wanting to educate future psychiatrists and staff, established three internship programs within the Asylum, providing a free room and a small salary to the interns. The internship programs would later launch the careers of Charles Kirk Clarke, whose father, Charles Clarke, was Workman's friend, Thomas J. W. Burgess, who was one of Workman's godsons from the Congregation, and William George Metcalf, who was killed by a patient at the Rockwood Asylum.

He retired as medical superintendent in July 1875.

=== Later years ===
His later years involved translating Italian and Spanish articles on psychiatry and receiving many honors. He was elected the president of the Canadian Medical Association in 1877, the Toronto Medical Society in 1878, and the Ontario Medical Association in 1881. He was the first Canadian psychiatrist to be made honorary member of the Royal Medico-Psychological Association of Great Britain.

== Death and legacy ==
Workman died on 15 April 1894, at his home in Toronto. Daniel Hack Tuke called him the "Nestor of Canadian alienists" in a section regarding the Provision for the Insane in Canada in the first volume of his book A Dictionary of Psychological Medicine. The phrase has been interpreted as meaning "Father" or "Old Mentor" of Canadian psychiatry and historians continued to use that phrase in honor of Workman. On his obituary written by Charles Kirk Clarke, he wrote as "one of the oldest and most eminent members of the American Medico-Psychological Society." The Workman Hall, the largest Hall in the First Unitarian Congregation, was named after Joseph and Benjamin Workman.
