= Sarah Hall (glass artist) =

Canadian artist

Sarah Hall CM RCA
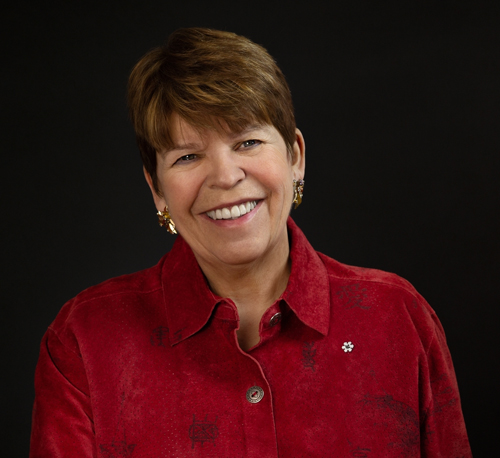
- Born: 1951 (age 74–75); Hamilton, Ontario
- Education: Sheridan College, Swansea College of Art, Apprenticeship with Lawrence Lee, ARCA
- Known for: Stained Glass artist, Solar Glass artist, Architectural Art Glass artist
- Notable work: 'Lux Gloria'- Cathedral of the Holy Family, 'Waterglass' - Harbourfront Centre, 'Lux Nova' - Regent College, UBC, 'Wisdom Windows' - Massey College, U of T.
- Movement: Artists In Stained Glass, Canada

Sarah Hall (born 1951) is a stained glass artist from Canada known for her large-scale art glass installations and solar projects. Her work can be found in churches, synagogues, schools, and other commercial and public buildings in Canada, the US, and Europe. She was appointed to the Order of Canada in 2019 in recognition of her contributions as a glass artist.

== Early life and education ==
Hall studied Architectural Glass at Sheridan College in Canada, and at Swansea College of Art in Wales.

=== Career ===
Hall established her own studio in 1980 and has created large scale artworks for public, private, and institutional clients. Her Lux Gloria consists of five large solar art glass windows at the Holy Family Cathedral (Saskatoon) and was reported by Daily Commercial News to be the first cathedral in the world to include photovoltaics with stained glass.

== Awards and recognition ==
In 2002 she was elected to membership in the Royal Canadian Academy of Arts. In 2019 Sarah Hall was appointed to the Order of Canada in recognition of her contributions as an architectural glass artist and for her technical innovations.

In 2017, the glass studio under Koen Vanderstukken at Sheridan College founded the Sarah Hall Glass Library. A collection of over 300 glass samples were donated to the Honours Bachelor of Craft and Design (Glass) program.

In 2018, the project records of Sarah Hall Studio were acquired by the Baldwin Collection of Canadiana, located at the Toronto Reference Library.

=== A Selection from A Thousand Colours Sarah Hall Glass ===
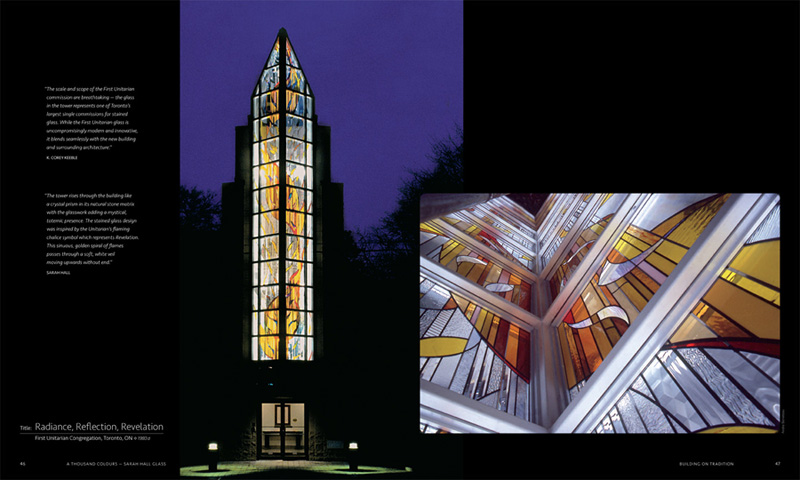
Radiance, Reflection, Revelation, First Unitarian Congregation of Toronto, Ontario (1993)

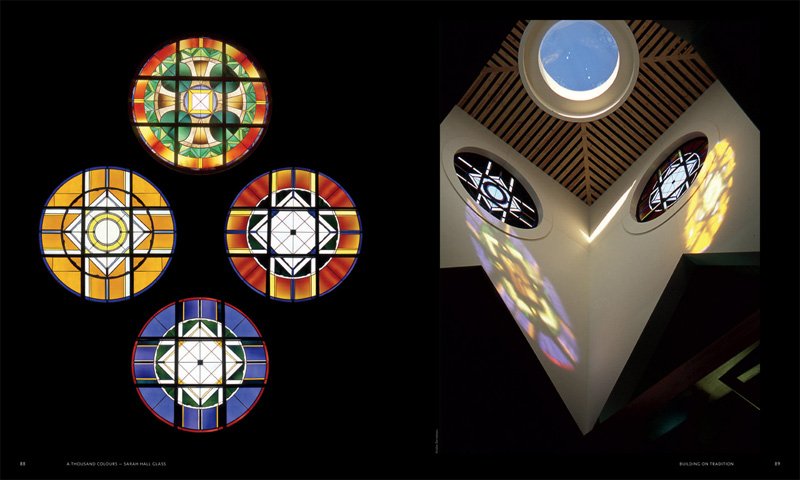
St Thomas A'Beckett Tower Windows, Canton, Michigan (2000)

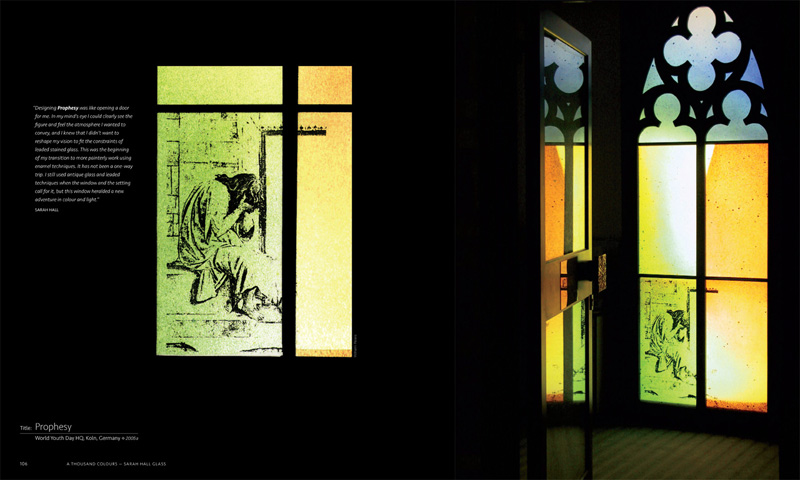
World Youth Day, Koln (2005)

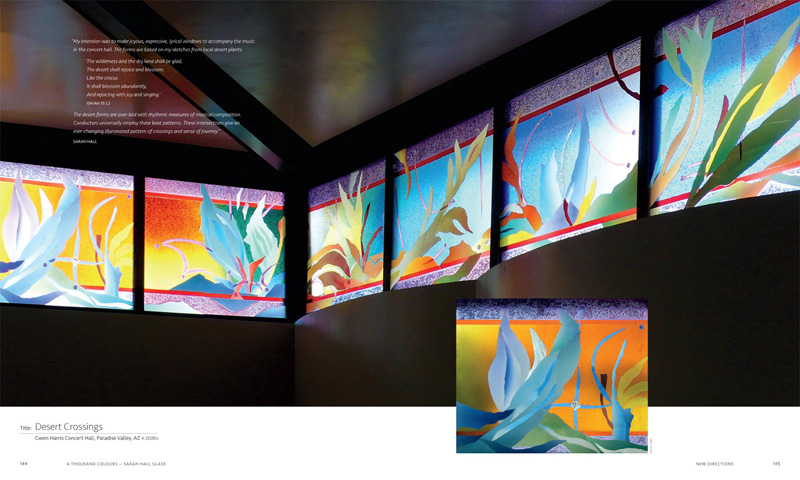
Gwen Harris Concert Hall, Paradise Valley, Arizona (2006)

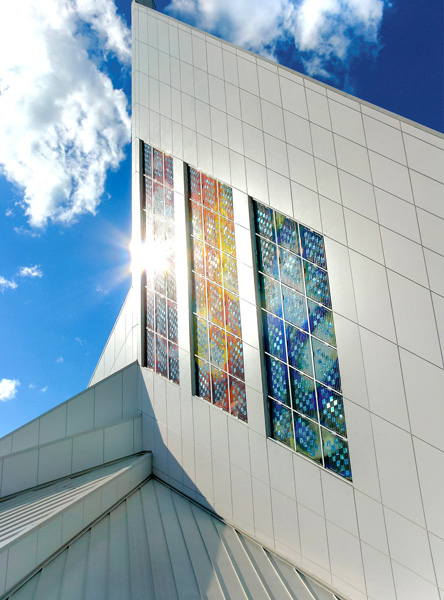
Lux Gloria, Cathedral of the Holy Family, Saskatoon, Saskatchewan (2011)

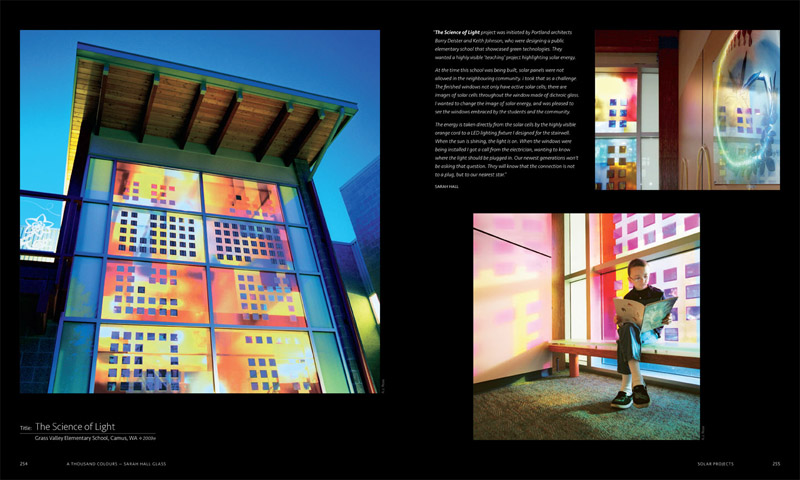
Grass Valley School, Camas, Washington (2009)

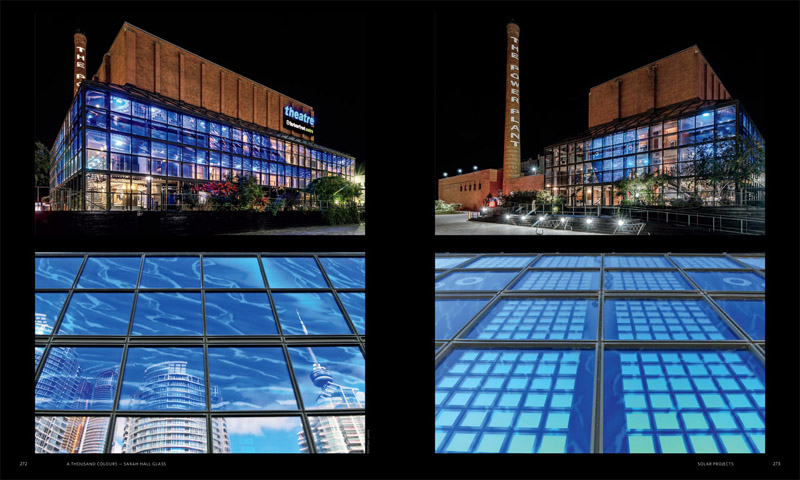
Waterglass, Harbourfront Centre, Toronto, Ontario (2011)

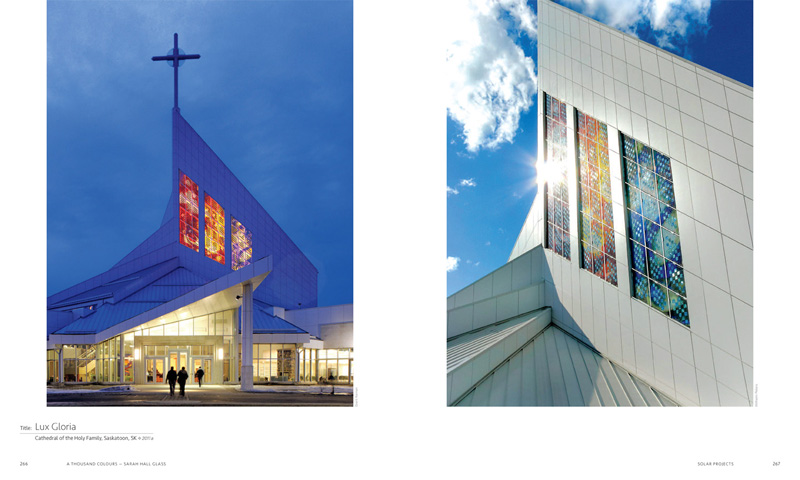
Twilight View Cathedral of the Holy Family, Saskatoon, Saskatchewan (2011)

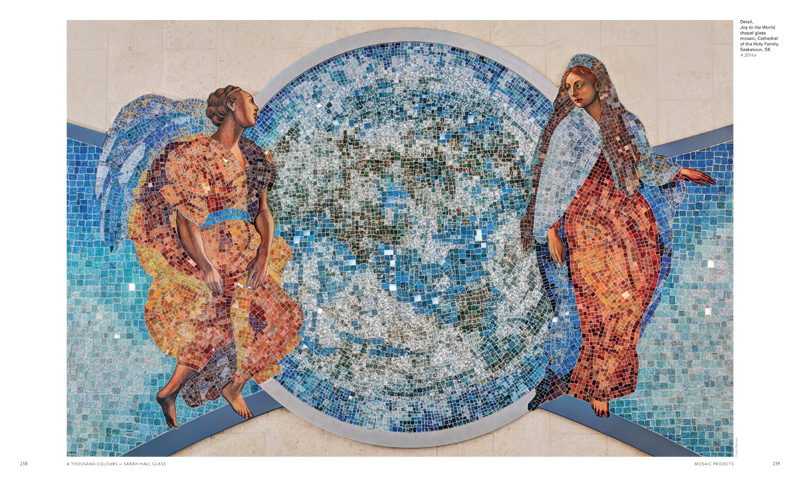
Cathedral of the Holy Family, Saskatoon, Saskatchewan (2014)

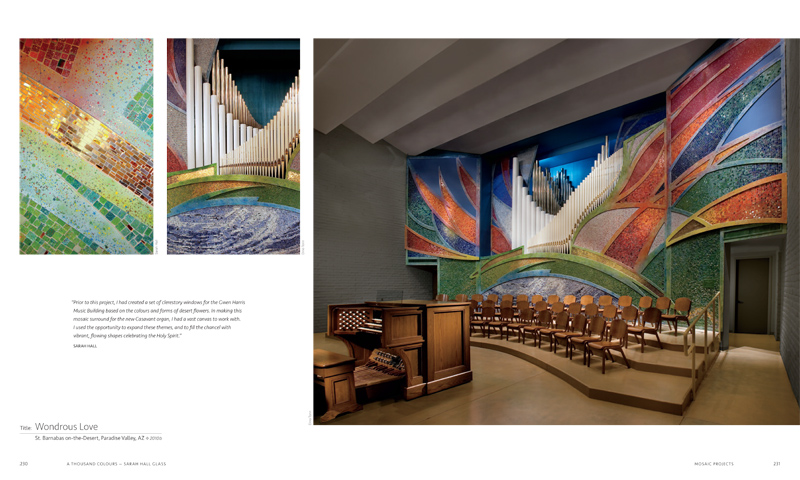
St. Barnabas on-the-Desert, Paradise Valley, Arizona (2010)

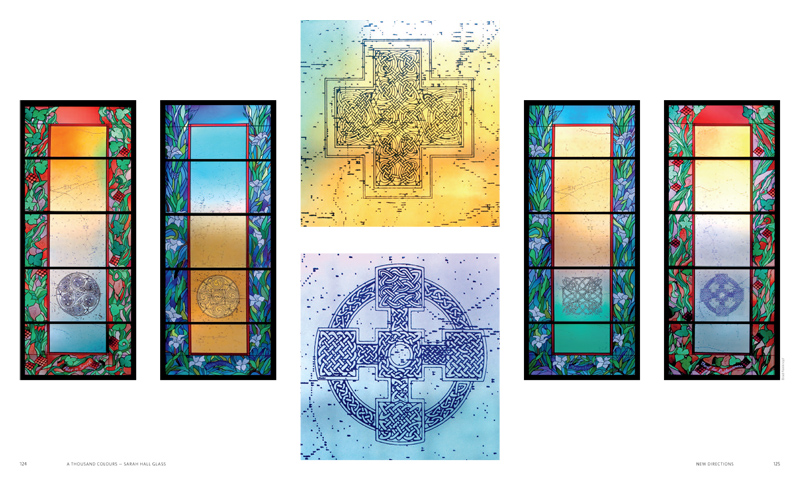
St. Catherine of Siena, Columbus, Ohio (2000-2006)

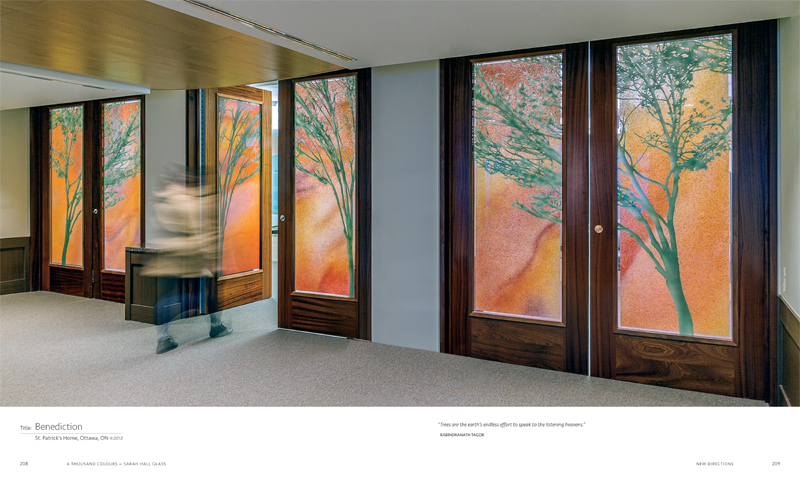
St. Patrick's Home, Ottawa, Ontario (2013)

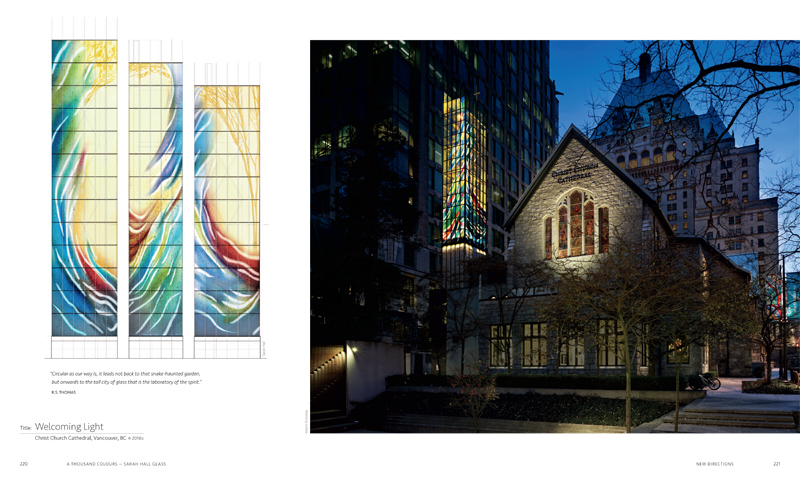
Christ Church Cathedral, Vancouver, British Columbia (2016)

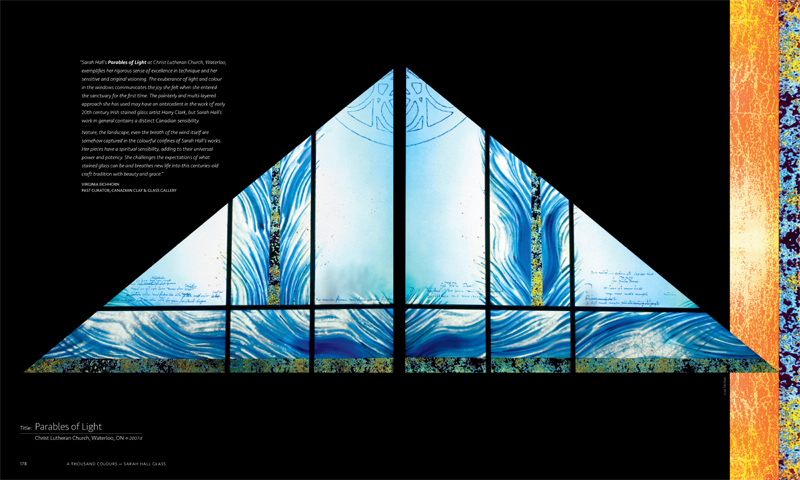
Christ Lutheran Church, Waterloo, Ontario (2007)

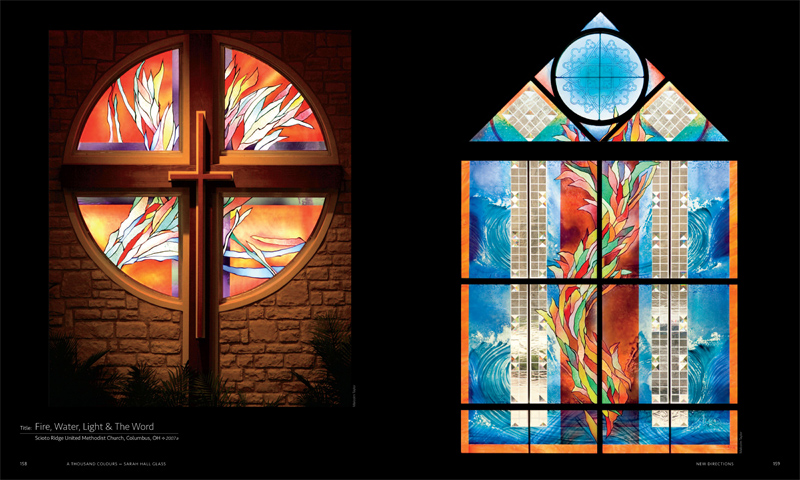
Scioto Ridge United Methodist Church, Columbus, Ohio (2007)

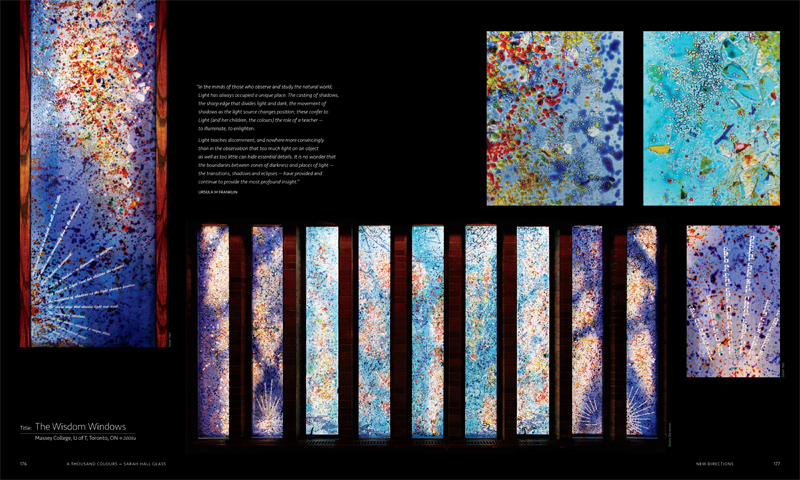
Massey College, University of Toronto, Ontario (2009)

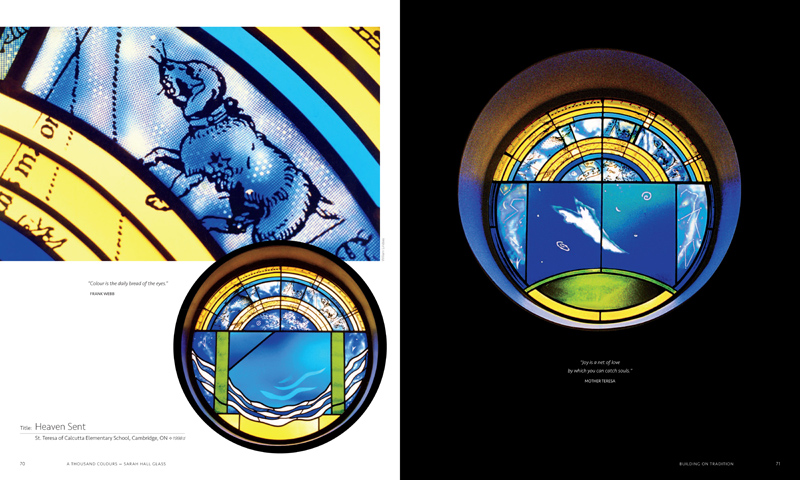
St. Teresa of Calcutta Elementary School, Cambridge, Ontario (1998)

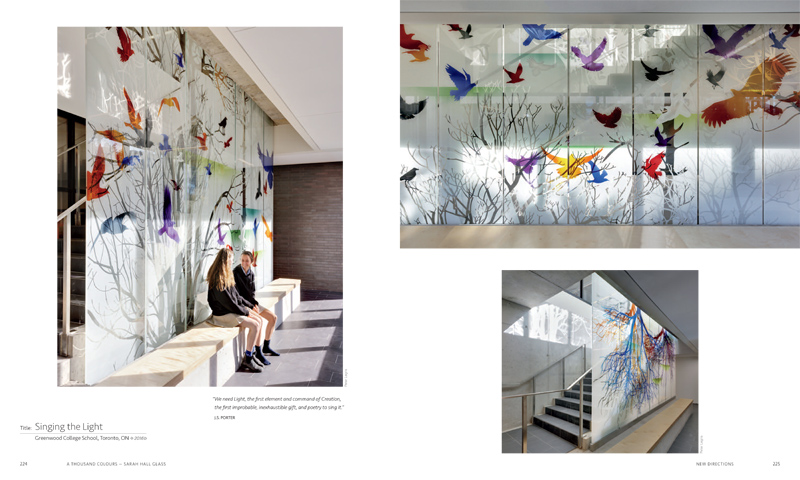
Greenwood College School, Toronto, Ontario (2016)

== Books and articles ==
Hall has written or co-authored three books:

- The Color of Light was published by LTP, Archdiocese of Chicago in 1999.
- Windows on our Soul; A Spiritual Excavation (with co-author Bob Shantz), was published by Novalis in 2007. The book is based on Hall's series of windows inspired by early Christian imagery.
- Transfiguring Prairie Skies: Stained Glass at Cathedral of the Holy Family (with co-author Donald Bolen), was published by The Roman Catholic Diocese of Saskatoon in 2012.

=== Books featuring Sarah Hall ===
- Torgerson, Mark A. 2012. Greening Spaces for Worship and Ministry: Congregations, Their Buildings, and Creation Care. Herndon: Alban Institute/Rowman & Littlefield. (Page 154 - 155).
- Schwebel, Horst, ed. Glasmalerei für das 21. Jahrhundert. (Band II). 2012. Paderborn: Glasmalerei Peters GmbH. (Page 67, 77, 99, 102 - 103, 129).
- Porter, J.S. 2011. The Glass Art of Sarah Hall. Herndon: Paderborn: Glasmalerei Peters GmbH.
- Philippart, David, ed. 2001. Basket, Basin, Plate, and Cup: Vessels in the Liturgy. Chicago: Liturgy Training Publications. (Cover, page 20).
- Crawford, Gail. 1998. A Fine Line: Studio Crafts in Ontario from 1930 to the Present. Toronto: Dundurn Press. (Page 156 - 158).
