= Sexual psychopath =

Category of criminals

Sexual psychopath (defined in the 1930s) was a category of criminals roughly defined as male sex offenders who had little to no control over their sexual impulses. The typology was built upon 19th-century Canadian psychiatrist Joseph Workman's five main categories of insanity. It was popularized in the United States during a moral panic regarding sex crimes that lasted from the late 1930s to the 1940s. The popularization of the sexual psychopath category in North America led to the creation of sexual psychopath laws in the United States and Canada.

Sexual psychopath laws have been criticized for their lack of proper scientific basis. By the 1990s, most of such laws had been overturned or fallen out of use in the United States. It is still defined in statute in Minnesota.

== History ==
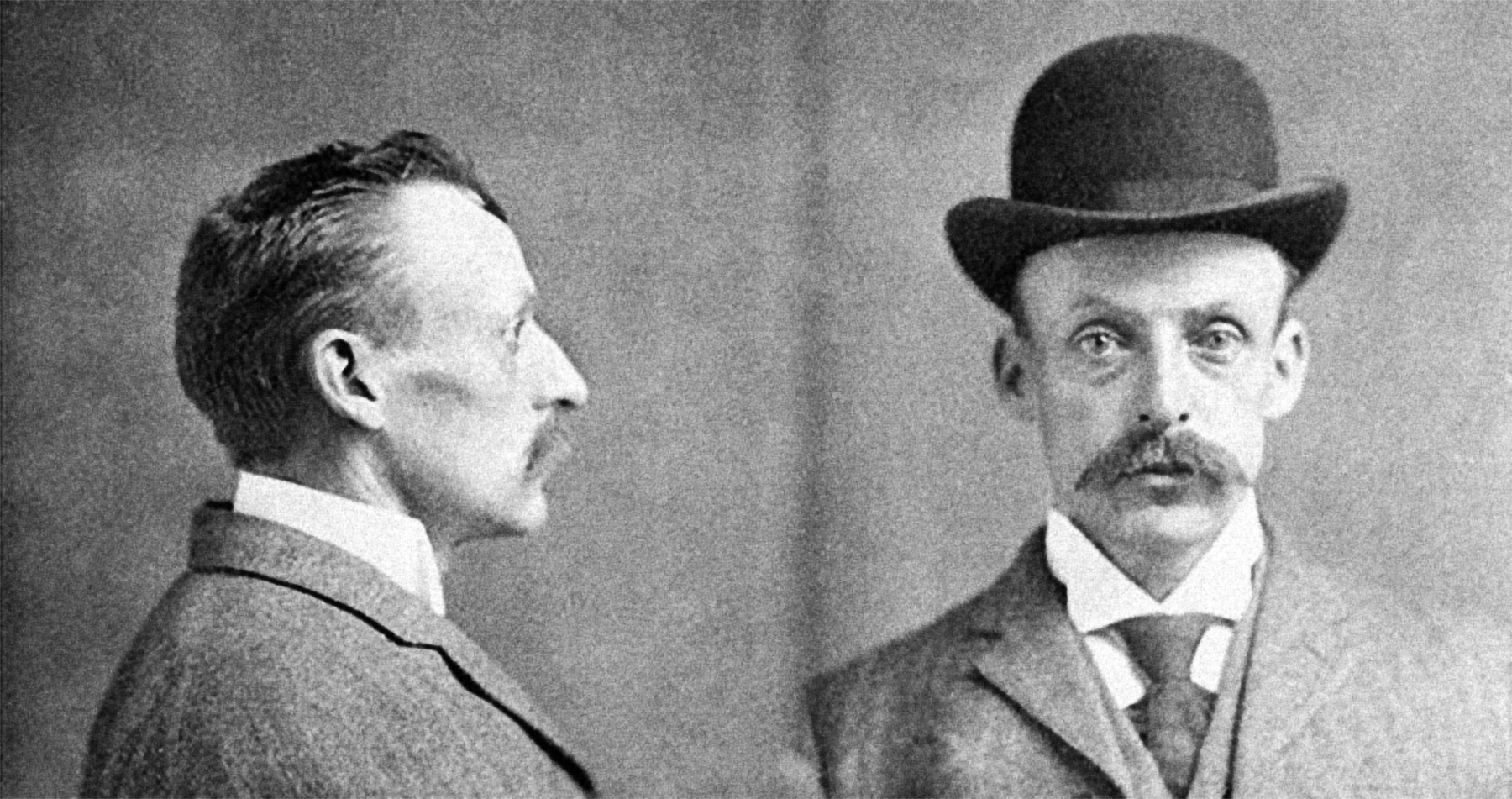
Serial killer Albert Fish, whose murders aggravated public concerns over child murder by strangers in the 1930s.

The popularization of the category occurred during a period of widely publicized, sexually motivated child murder cases, many of which were highly sensationalized by the American media. Despite the lack of evidence that child sexual assault and murder rates were rising, public concern regarding the matter increased, and a new wave of sex crime laws ensued.

During the moral panic, news outlets, such as The Christian Century, The Nation and the New Masses started covering sex crimes at an increased rate, with other organizations publishing articles denouncing "queer people", "sexual psychopaths" and sex offenders. The New York Times, despite being silent on the matter previously, began publishing an increased number of over forty articles per year between 1937 and 1940, an increase that caused the journal to create a separate index category specially dedicated to sex crimes.

In this period, law enforcement increased their number of crackdowns on sexual crimes, including minor offenses, and several American states passed sexual psychopath laws, many of which increased punishments for sex crimes and required the civil commitment of some sex offenders. Such laws generally defined a "sexual psychopath" as a chronic sex criminal who had little to no control over their sexual urges. However, no scientific evidence for the existence of such a phenomenon was ever provided, and further studies on sex offending made after the 1950s challenged this category's underlying theory.

== Popular culture ==
Societal anxieties over sexual psychopaths influenced the detective novels I, the Jury (1947) and The Killer Inside Me (1952), both of which characterized the main detective as a "psychopath". The moral panic also led to an increased widespread interest in sexual murder stories, such as that of M.

== See also ==
- Superpredator
