= Minnesota Housing Finance Agency =

Government agency in Minnesota, USA

- Logo of Minnesota Housing

Agency overview
- Formed: 1971; 55 years ago
- Jurisdiction: Minnesota
- Employees: 100+
- Agency executive: Jennifer Ho, Commissioner of Minnesota Housing
- Website: www.mnhousing.gov

The Minnesota Housing Finance Agency (MHFA), or Minnesota Housing, is a state agency in Minnesota, United States, established to address the growing concerns of affordable housing, homelessness, and housing security in the state. Its primary mission is to provide affordable housing opportunities for Minnesotans who are low and moderate income earners. Created by the Minnesota Legislature, the agency works to stimulate the construction, rehabilitation, and sustainability of affordable homes and rental properties.

== History ==
The MHFA was established in 1971 in response to the increasing need for affordable housing solutions in Minnesota. The agency was set up with the intent to provide safe, decent, and affordable housing, especially for vulnerable populations like the elderly, disabled, and low-income families. It collaborates with local governments, developers, and non-profit organizations to achieve its mission.

Jennifer Ho is the director of MHFA.

== Functions and responsibilities ==
=== Financing programs ===
MHFA offers a range of financing programs aimed at making homeownership and renting more accessible. This includes low-interest loans, mortgage assistance, and rent subsidies.

=== Grants and tax credits ===
The agency is responsible for distributing federal and state housing grants and tax credits to eligible parties. This incentivizes developers to create more affordable housing units.

=== Research ===
MHFA conducts research and data analysis to determine housing needs across Minnesota, helping policy-makers make informed decisions regarding housing policies.

=== Education and counseling ===
The agency provides education and counseling services to first-time homebuyers and renters to help them understand their rights and responsibilities.

== Operations ==
MHFA works through partnerships with local banks, mortgage lenders, and housing developers. It receives funding from both federal and state governments and allocates these funds through various programs aimed at increasing affordable housing.

== Impact and accomplishments ==
Since its establishment, MHFA has been instrumental in the construction and rehabilitation of thousands of housing units across Minnesota. It has also provided financing to numerous first-time homeowners, thereby aiding in the economic development of the state.

== Controversies and criticisms ==
While MHFA has been pivotal in increasing affordable housing options in Minnesota, it has also faced criticisms. Concerns have been raised about the adequate distribution of resources and whether the agency's work reaches the most vulnerable populations effectively.

== Future directions ==
With the rising challenges of housing insecurity, the Minnesota Housing Finance Agency continues to evolve its strategies to meet the needs of a growing and diversifying population. Technological advances and policy reforms are expected to play a significant role in shaping the agency's future endeavors.

== See also ==
- United States Department of Housing and Urban Development (HUD)
- Affordable housing
