= Minnesota Department of Human Services =

Executive agency in Minnesota, US

Agency overview
- Jurisdiction: State of Minnesota
- Headquarters: 444 Lafayette Road, Saint Paul, Minnesota 55155
- Employees: 7000+ (2024)
- Annual budget: $45 Billion
- Agency executives: Shireen Gandhi, Temporary Commissioner; Josh Syrjamaki, Chief of Staff
- Website: mn.gov/dhs/

Map
- MN DHS Jurisdiction highlighting State of Minnesota in the United States.

Minnesota Department of Human Services (DHS) is a cabinet level executive agency responsible for implementing major social programs like the Supplemental Nutrition Assistance Program, Medical Assistance (The Minnesota Medicaid program) and Minnesota Family Investment Program (the Minnesota Temporary Assistance for Needy Families program). It also enforces child support and child protection and provides care to people who are mentally unwell, developmentally disabled, or chemically dependent through Minnesota Direct Care and Treatment.

With a budget of over $40 billion, DHS is the largest Minnesota agency by budget and employee count.

== History ==
The Minnesota Department of Human Services was founded in 1983 when the Department of Public Welfare was integrated into the state Medicaid agency and hospital system.

== DHS Split ==
In 2023, the Minnesota Legislature passed a law dividing the responsibilities of the Department of Human Services into a new, smaller DHS and two new agencies. The newly independent Minnesota Direct Care and Treatment will operate the state hospitals caring for people with mental illness or developmental and intellectual disabilities, as well as the Minnesota Sex Offender's program and Minnesota Department of Children, Youth and Families, which will oversee adoption, child protection and other family services.
