= Jennifer Ho =

American politician

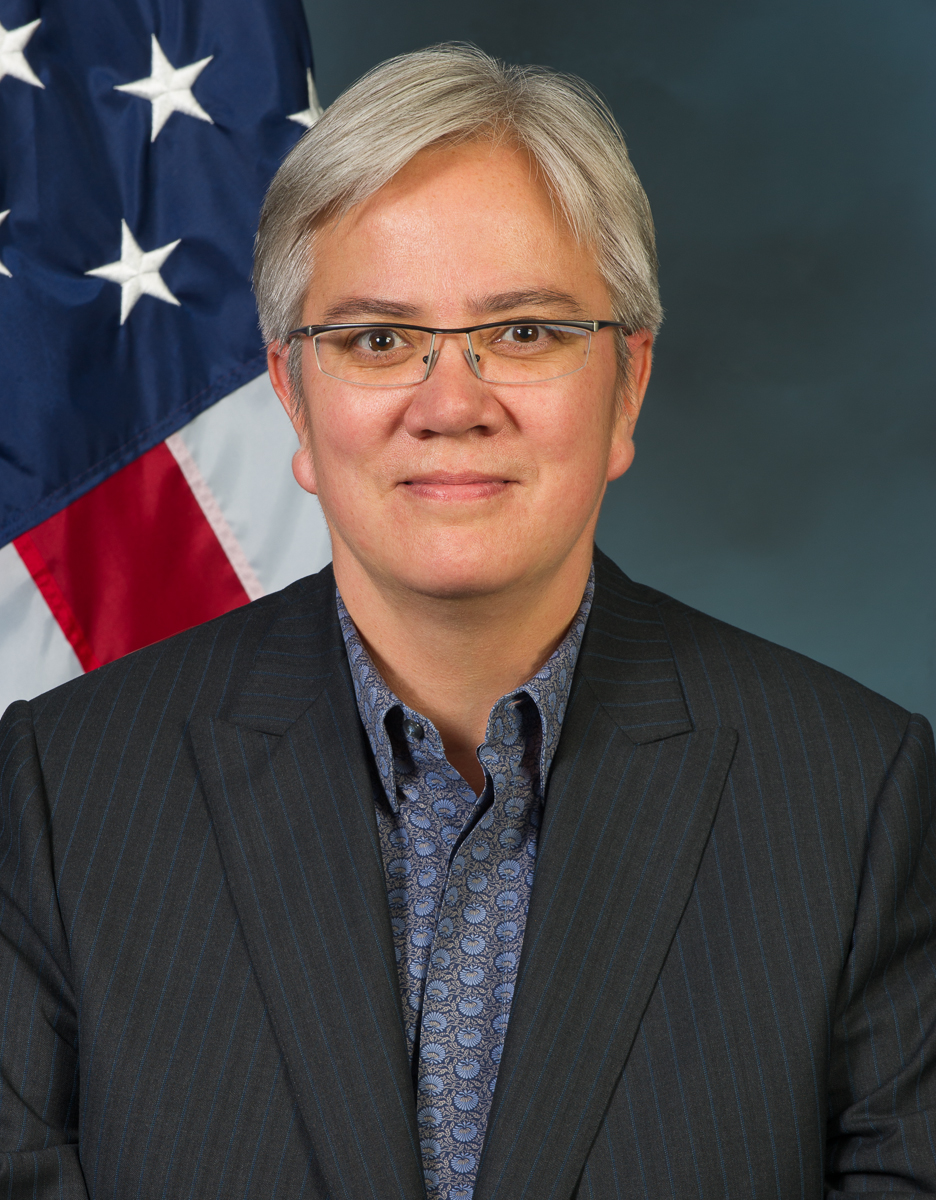
- Ho in 2013

Director of the Minnesota Housing Finance Agency
- Incumbent
- Assumed office 2019
- Appointed by: Tim Walz

Personal details
- Born: Minnesota
- Known for: Hearth Connection

Jennifer Ho is an American government official. She was the Senior Advisor for Housing and Services at the U.S. Department of Housing and Urban Development.

During the administration of President Barack Obama. She had a history of working to fight homelessness in America. Prior to her appointment to the Department of Housing and Urban Development, she oversaw the creation of Opening Doors, the country's first federal plan to end homelessness, while serving as deputy director at the United States Interagency Council on Homelessness.

In December 2018, Governor-elect Tim Walz nominated Ho to serve as director of the Minnesota Housing Finance Agency. She was reappointed in 2023.

== Early life and education ==
Ho was born and raised in Minnesota and graduated from Bryn Mawr in 1987, earning her bachelor's degree in philosophy.

== Career ==
From 1999 to 2010, Ho was executive director of Hearth Connection, a nonprofit project focusing on homelessness in Minnesota. From 2010 to 2013, she served as deputy director at the United States Interagency Council on Homelessness (USICH), overseeing the creation of Opening Doors, the country's first federal plan to end homelessness. During her time at USICH, she also incorporated programs to address poverty and homelessness for Native Americans living on tribal land and also in urban United States areas. In 2013, she was appointed as Senior Advisor for Housing and Services at the Department of Housing and Urban Development (HUD).

Ho's work has focused on preventing and ending homelessness for families, and the impact homelessness has on health. She has been very involved in "rapid rehousing," a method of helping families leave homeless shelters and become rehoused as soon as possible. Under her administration, HUD has spent nearly $1.5 billion on this initiative, making it "a key tool for reducing homelessness for hundreds and thousands of families."
