= National Register of Historic Places listings in Barrington, Rhode Island =

The following properties and districts in Barrington, Rhode Island, are on the National Register of Historic Places.

Contents: Counties in Rhode Island

Bristol | Kent | Newport | Providence (Pawtucket | Providence (city) | Woonsocket) | Washington

This National Park Service list is complete through NPS recent listings posted May 1, 2026.

	Name on the Register	Image	Date listed	Location	City or town	Description
1	Alfred Drowne Road Historic District	Alfred Drowne Road Historic District	June 10, 2005 (#05000584)	Alfred Drowne Rd., Annawamscutt Rd., Washington Rd. 41°44′38″N 71°20′38″W	Barrington	
2	Allen-West House	Allen-West House	December 3, 2013 (#13000887)	153 George St. 41°46′19″N 71°18′44″W	Barrington	
3	Barrington Civic Center	Barrington Civic Center	December 12, 1976 (#76000198)	County Rd. 41°44′29″N 71°18′33″W	Barrington	
4	Belton Court	Belton Court	June 30, 1976 (#76000037)	Middle Highway; 41°45′36″N 71°19′57″W	Barrington	
5	Benjamin Aborn Jackson House	Benjamin Aborn Jackson House	September 19, 2008 (#08000903)	115 Nayatt Rd. 41°43′34″N 71°19′58″W	Barrington	
6	Jennys Lane Historic District	Jennys Lane Historic District	March 6, 2008 (#08000152)	Jennys Ln. and Mathewson and Rumstick Rds. 41°44′04″N 71°17′58″W	Barrington	
7	Nayatt Point Lighthouse	Nayatt Point Lighthouse	February 25, 1988 (#87001694)	Nayatt Point; 41°43′30″N 71°20′23″W	Barrington	
8	O'Bannon Mill	O'Bannon Mill	July 23, 1996 (#96000891)	90 Bay Spring Ave. 41°44′50″N 71°20′43″W	Barrington	
9	St. Matthew's Episcopal Church	St. Matthew's Episcopal Church	August 22, 1991 (#91001024)	5 Chapel Rd. 41°44′34″N 71°20′37″W	Barrington	

== See also ==
- National Register of Historic Places listings in Bristol County, Rhode Island
- List of National Historic Landmarks in Rhode Island
