= National Register of Historic Places listings in Warren, Rhode Island =

List of Registered Historic Places in Warren, Rhode Island, United States, which has been transferred from and is an integral part of National Register of Historic Places listings in Bristol County, Rhode Island

Contents: Counties in Rhode Island

Bristol | Kent | Newport | Providence | Washington

This National Park Service list is complete through NPS recent listings posted April 3, 2026.

	Name on the Register	Image	Date listed	Location	City or town	Description
1	Warren United Methodist Church and Parsonage	Warren United Methodist Church and Parsonage	August 12, 1971 (#71000012)	27 Church St. 41°43′49″N 71°17′02″W	Warren	
2	Warren Waterfront Historic District	Warren Waterfront Historic District	February 28, 1974 (#74000035)	Bounded roughly by the Warren River, Belcher Cove, and the old town line (includes Main St. to Campbell St.); 41°43′51″N 71°17′04″W	Warren	

== See also ==
- National Register of Historic Places listings in Bristol County, Rhode Island
- List of National Historic Landmarks in Rhode Island
