= Benjamin Aborn Jackson House =

Historic house in Rhode Island, United States

- U.S. National Register of Historic Places
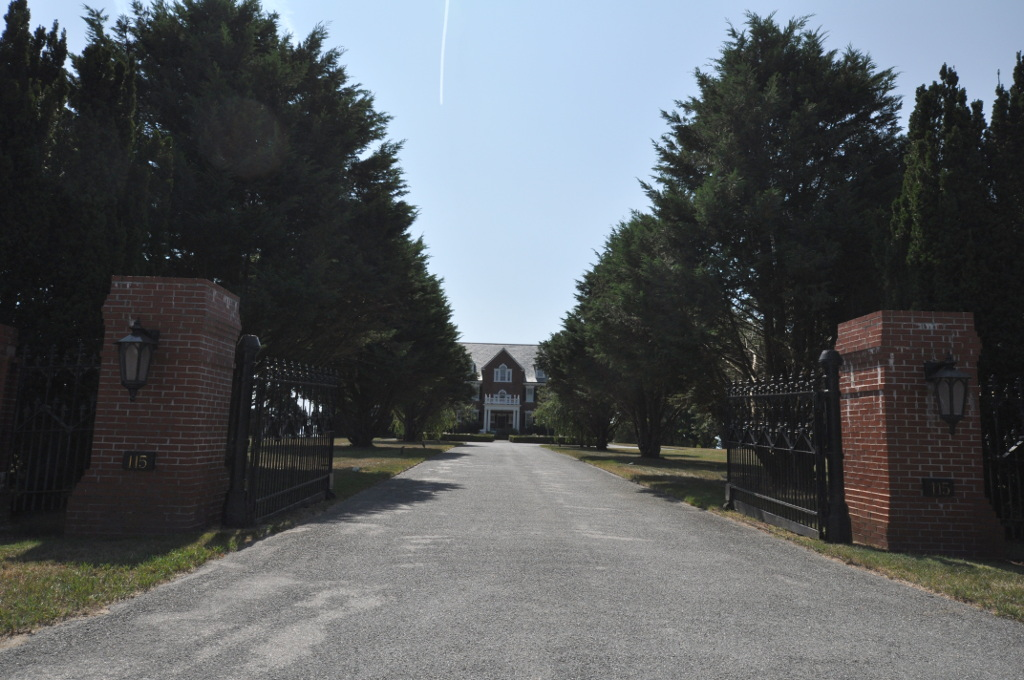

- Location within Rhode Island Location within the United States
- Location: 115 Nayatt Road, Barrington, Rhode Island
- Coordinates: 41°43′34.08″N 71°19′57.73″W
- Area: 3.8 acres (1.5 ha)
- Built: 1913
- Architect: Norman M. Isham
- Architectural style: Colonial Revival
- NRHP reference No.: 08000903
- Added to NRHP: September 19, 2008

The Benjamin Aborn Jackson House is an historic house at 115 Nayatt Road in Barrington, Rhode Island. The 2 1/2-story brick house was designed by architect Norman M. Isham and completed in 1913 for Benjamin Aborn Jackson, a Rhode Island banking and railroad executive. The house is a rare survivor of the development of Nayatt Point as a resort area. The L-shaped building is set well back from Nayatt Road, and is not far from the Nayatt Point Light.

The house was listed on the National Register of Historic Places in 2008.

== See also ==
- National Register of Historic Places listings in Bristol County, Rhode Island
