= Lookout (clipper) =

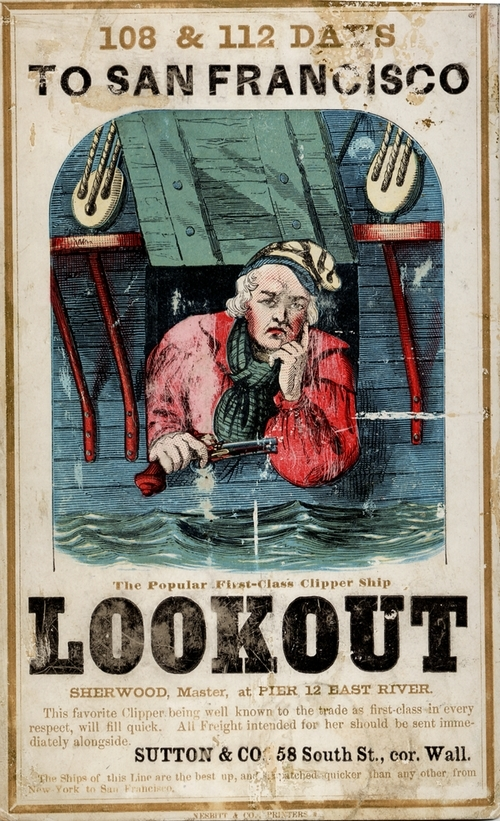
- Lookout

History

United States
- Name: Lookout
- Owner: E. Buckley & Sons, New York City
- Builder: Chase & Davis, Warren, RI
- Launched: 10 October 1853
- Fate: Wrecked in the Japan Sea, 1878

General characteristics
- Class & type: Clipper
- Tons burthen: 1291 tons NM
- Length: 198 ft.
- Beam: 38 ft. 4 in.
- Draft: 21 ft. 9 in.

Lookout was an 1853 clipper known for her passages from New York to San Francisco, and as an offshore and coastal trader in the lumber and coal trades.

== Launched at the height of the clipper boom ==
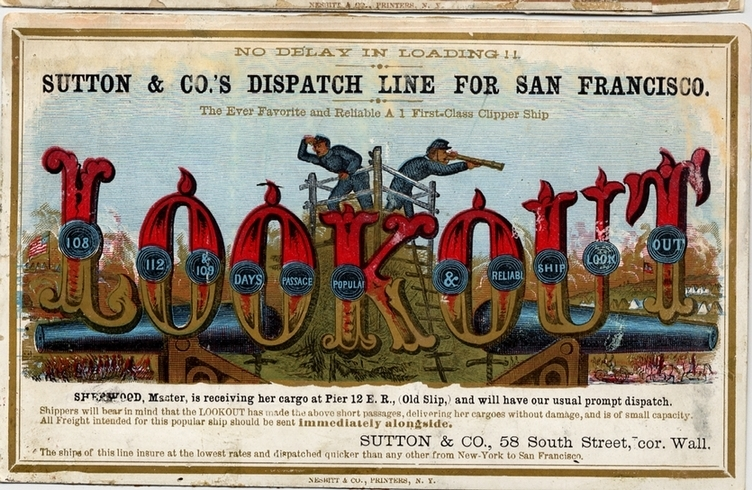

Lookout was launched in 1853, just as the construction of clippers reached its peak. The day that Lookout loaded for her first trip to sea, 10 November 1853, there were ten other new clippers loading at the piers in New York for their maiden voyages: Chief of Clippers, Edwin Forrest, Electric, David Brown, David Crockett, Dreadnought, Golden Fleece, Lightfoot, Pride of America, and Quickstep.

== Voyages ==
Lookout made 16 passages to San Francisco between 1854 and 1871. Her fastest was 108 days. On three voyages she met with unfavorable weather, her slowest trip being 157 days; however, her remaining 13 passages averaged 121 days, a very respectable showing.

She also called at the ports of Boston, Shanghai, Hong Kong, Liverpool, Callao, Chamala, Mexico, Honolulu, New Bedford, and Port Stanley, as well as making a voyage to Australia, before she was sold into the Pacific Coast lumber and coal trade in 1871.

In 1855, on a voyage from San Francisco to Hong Kong, Lookout was two days shy of Hong Kong when she encountered a British clipper, Invincible, in distress and about to be abandoned. Invincible had collided with the ship A. Chesebrough and sunk it, but managed to save members of Chesebrough's crew. Lookout received $25,000 in salvage money for its efforts in assisting Invincible to reach Hong Kong.

== Locomotive transport ==
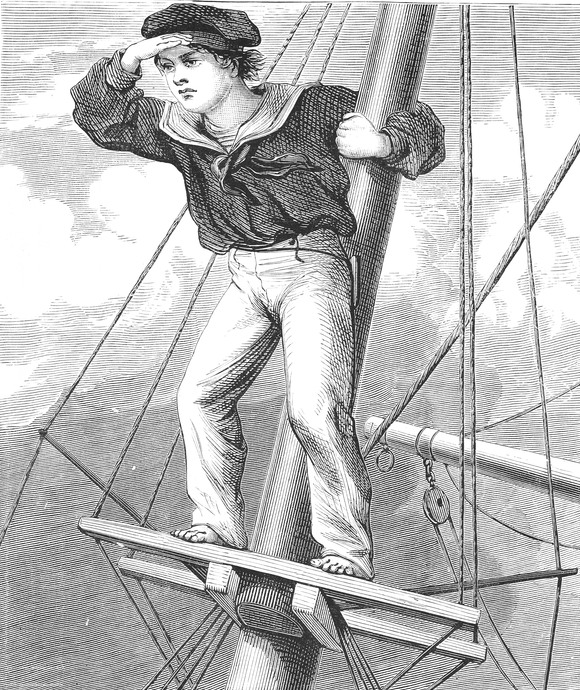
Lookout boy aloft, by Harrison Weir

In September 1867, the three clipper ships Lookout, Franklin, and Haze delivered a total of four locomotives between them to San Francisco for the California Pacific Railroad Company. Lookout left New York on 26 April 1867, and arrived in San Francisco on 11 September 1867.

== Loss of the ship ==
In 1878, Lookout was wrecked in the Japan Sea. She was en route to Puget Sound from Shanghai, and was partially dismasted in a typhoon on September 12. She went up on a reef near the island of Kutsonoshima. Three crewmen drowned attempting to land the ship's boats; the rest managed to land with the help of local fishermen.
