= National Register of Historic Places listings in Bristol County, Rhode Island =

Location of Bristol County in Rhode Island

This is a list of the National Register of Historic Places listings in Bristol County, Rhode Island.

This is intended to be a complete list of the properties and districts on the National Register of Historic Places in Bristol County, Rhode Island, United States. Latitude and longitude coordinates are provided for many National Register properties and districts; these locations may be seen together in a map.

There are 25 properties and districts listed on the National Register in the county, including one National Historic Landmark.

== Current listings ==
This National Park Service list is complete through NPS recent listings posted May 1, 2026.

	Name on the Register	Image	Date listed	Location	City or town	Description
1	Alfred Drowne Road Historic District	Alfred Drowne Road Historic District	June 10, 2005 (#05000584)	Alfred Drowne Rd., Annawamscutt Rd., Washington Rd. 41°44′38″N 71°20′38″W	Barrington	
2	Allen-West House	Allen-West House	December 3, 2013 (#13000887)	153 George St. 41°46′19″N 71°18′44″W	Barrington	
3	General Thomas Allin House		February 6, 2025 (#100011435)	20 Lincoln Avenue; 41°44′50″N 71°20′22″W	Barrington	
4	Barrington Civic Center	Barrington Civic Center	December 12, 1976 (#76000198)	County Rd. 41°44′29″N 71°18′33″W	Barrington	
5	Belton Court	Belton Court	June 30, 1976 (#76000037)	Middle Highway; 41°45′36″N 71°19′57″W	Barrington	
6	Blithewold	Blithewold	June 27, 1980 (#80000074)	Ferry Rd. 41°39′14″N 71°16′07″W	Bristol	1890s summer retreat established by Augustus Van Wickle, Pennsylvania coal magnate
7	Bristol County Courthouse	Bristol County Courthouse	April 28, 1970 (#70000011)	High St. 41°39′48″N 71°16′17″W	Bristol	Built in 1816 and was used for RI State legislator meetings until 1854.
8	Bristol County Jail	Bristol County Jail	April 24, 1973 (#73000048)	48 Court St. 41°40′10″N 71°16′32″W	Bristol	
9	Bristol Customshouse and Post Office	Bristol Customshouse and Post Office	May 31, 1972 (#72000015)	420-448 Hope St. 41°39′58″N 71°16′31″W	Bristol	
10	Bristol Ferry Lighthouse	Bristol Ferry Lighthouse	February 25, 1988 (#87001696)	Ferry Rd. 41°38′35″N 71°15′37″W	Bristol	
11	Bristol Waterfront Historic District	Bristol Waterfront Historic District	March 18, 1975 (#75000053)	Bristol Harbor to E side of Wood St. as far N as Washington St. and S to Walker Cove; 41°40′10″N 71°16′31″W	Bristol	
12	Benjamin Church House	Benjamin Church House	September 22, 1971 (#71000011)	1014 Hope St. 41°41′09″N 71°16′43″W	Bristol	
13	Benjamin Aborn Jackson House	Benjamin Aborn Jackson House	September 19, 2008 (#08000903)	115 Nayatt Rd. 41°43′34″N 71°19′58″W	Barrington	
14	Jennys Lane Historic District	Jennys Lane Historic District	March 6, 2008 (#08000152)	Jennys Ln. and Mathewson and Rumstick Rds. 41°44′04″N 71°17′58″W	Barrington	
15	Juniper Hill Cemetery	Juniper Hill Cemetery	June 3, 1998 (#98000632)	24 Sherry Ave. 41°40′53″N 71°16′06″W	Bristol	
16	Longfield	Longfield	July 17, 1972 (#72000016)	1200 Hope St. 41°41′49″N 71°16′47″W	Bristol	
17	Mount Hope Bridge	Mount Hope Bridge	January 31, 1976 (#76000038)	RI 114 over Narragansett Bay; 41°38′25″N 71°15′32″W	Bristol	Opened in 1929. Connects Bristol to the town of Portsmouth on Aquidneck Island.
18	Mount Hope Farm	Mount Hope Farm	May 2, 1977 (#77000023)	Metacom Ave. 41°40′09″N 71°14′50″W	Bristol	
19	Nayatt Point Lighthouse	Nayatt Point Lighthouse	February 25, 1988 (#87001694)	Nayatt Point; 41°43′30″N 71°20′23″W	Barrington	
20	O'Bannon Mill	O'Bannon Mill	July 23, 1996 (#96000891)	90 Bay Spring Ave. 41°44′50″N 71°20′43″W	Barrington	
21	Poppasquash Farms Historic District	Poppasquash Farms Historic District	June 27, 1980 (#80000075)	Off RI 114; 41°40′45″N 71°17′44″W	Bristol	Includes Colt State Park and adjacent properties.
22	Joseph Reynolds House	Joseph Reynolds House	May 31, 1972 (#72000017)	956 Hope St. 41°41′01″N 71°16′46″W	Bristol	Oldest three-story frame house in New England, dating to 1700. Used as headquarters by Lafayette during 1778 Rhode Island campaign.
23	St. Matthew's Episcopal Church	St. Matthew's Episcopal Church	August 22, 1991 (#91001024)	5 Chapel Rd. 41°44′34″N 71°20′37″W	Barrington	
24	Warren United Methodist Church and Parsonage	Warren United Methodist Church and Parsonage	August 12, 1971 (#71000012)	27 Church St. 41°43′49″N 71°17′02″W	Warren	
25	Warren Waterfront Historic District	Warren Waterfront Historic District	February 28, 1974 (#74000035)	Bounded roughly by the Warren River, Belcher Cove, and the old town line (includes Main St. to Campbell St.); 41°43′51″N 71°17′04″W	Warren	

== See also ==
- List of National Historic Landmarks in Rhode Island
- National Register of Historic Places listings in Rhode Island
