= Lou Abbruzzi =

American football player (1917–1982)

Profile
- Positions: Halfback, defensive back

Personal information
- Born: August 3, 1917; Warren, Rhode Island
- Died: December 6, 1982 (aged 65); Newport, Rhode Island

Career information
- College: Rhode Island
- NFL draft: : Free Agent Green Bay 1941, Boston Yanks 1946th round

Career history
- 1946: Boston Yanks

Awards and highlights
- All Small New England 1938-40; All New England 1938; HM Little All-American 1938, 1939.
- Stats at Pro Football Reference

Louis John "Duke" Abbruzzi (August 3, 1917 – December 6, 1982) was an American football, basketball and baseball player.

== Early career ==
Born in Warren, Rhode Island, Abbruzzi attended Warren High School where he received 'All State' recognition on six occasions in all three sports: football, basketball and baseball.

Sports cartoonist Frank Lanning dubbed him the 'Duke of Warren' in his illustrations published in the Providence Journal.

== Professional career ==
Returning from his service in the US Army, Abbruzzi spent one season with the Boston Yanks of the National Football League (NFL) as a special teams player and tailback. He accounted for 229 all-purpose yards, 26 rushing yards from 6 carries, 55 receiving yards on 2 receptions, 147 yards on 8 kick off returns and completed one pass for 11 yards.

== Coaching ==
In addition to participating in the sports, Abbruzzi also coached later in this career. He coached DeLaSalle Academy, Rogers High and Thompson Junior High, Newport. In 1971 the team he coached at Rogers High won the state baseball championship.
