= Hezekiah Butterworth =

American author and poet (1839–1905)

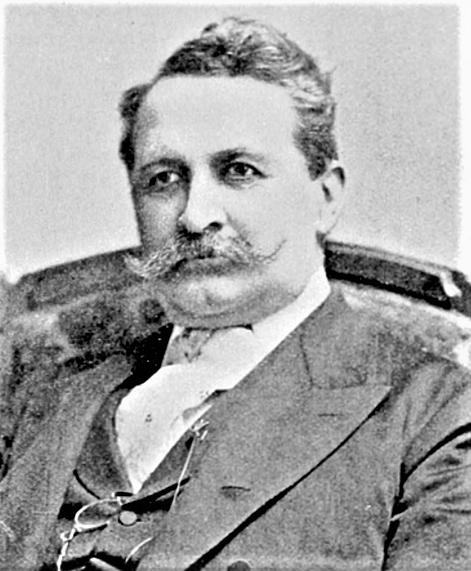
- Born: December 22, 1829; Warren, Rhode Island
- Died: September 5, 1905 (aged 75); Warren, Rhode Island
- Occupation: Writer

Hezekiah Butterworth (December 22, 1839 – September 5, 1905) was an American author and poet.

== Biography ==
Butterworth was born in Warren, Rhode Island. He was a platform lecturer, speaking on education, hymnology, and his travels, which included tours in Europe, South America, Cuba, and Canada. Most of his books were written for young readers, including several volumes of Zig-Zag Journeys, the Knight of Liberty, In the Boyhood of Lincoln, Great Composers, The Patriot Schoolmaster, Songs of History, The Wampum Belt; or, The Fairest Page of History (about William Penn and his 1682 treaty with the Lenape people), Poems and Ballads, and Boys of Greenway Court. He also wrote several cantatas.

In early life, he began to contribute to the leading newspapers, among them the New York Independent. In 1870, he became connected with the Youth's Companion. He wrote 17 volumes of Zig-Zag Journeys, which sold 250,000 copies. He wrote the Story of the Hymns for the American Tract Society in 1875, and won the George Wood Gold Medal for it. He later prepared a companion volume called The Story of the Tunes. He prepared several cantatas for George F. Root's music, and Under the Palms had a great popularity in England. He wrote for the Atlantic Monthly, Harper's publications, the Christian Union, and other periodicals. Volumes of his published poems include Poems for Christmas, Easter and New Year's and Songs of History. He was also one of the editors of The Youth's Companion.

Butterworth owned a farm on the Mt. Hope Lands in Bristol, Rhode Island, and he had a cottage at Belleview, Florida.

He died at his brother's home in Warren, Rhode Island on September 5, 1905.
