= Warren United Methodist Church and Parsonage =

Historic church in Rhode Island, United States

First United Methodist Church of Warren / Bristol
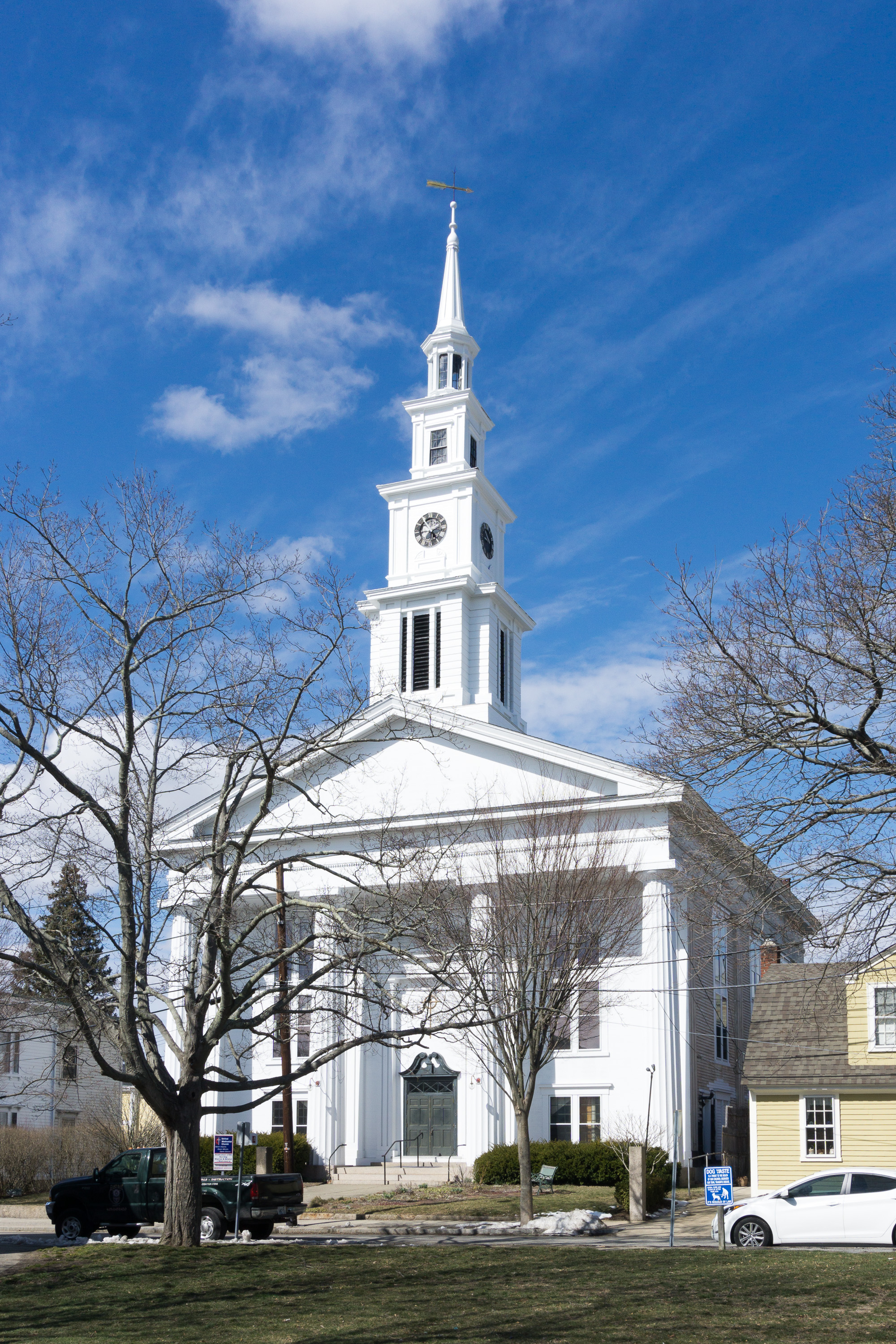
- First United Methodist Church of Warren / Bristol
- 41°43′49″N 71°17′2″W
- Location: Warren, Rhode Island
- Website: umcwarrenbristol.org/index.htm

History
- Former name(s): Warren United Methodist Church and Parsonage

Architecture
- Architect(s): Perez Mason; Hoar & Drown
- Warren United Methodist Church and Parsonage
- U.S. National Register of Historic Places
- U.S. Historic district – Contributing property
- Location within Rhode Island Location within the United States
- Built: 1844
- Built by: Hoar & Martin
- Architectural style: Greek Revival, Italian Villa
- Part of: Warren Waterfront Historic District (ID70000035)
- NRHP reference No.: 71000012

Significant dates
- Added to NRHP: August 12, 1971
- Designated CP: February 28, 1974

The Warren United Methodist Church and Parsonage are a Methodist church and house at 27 Church Street in the center of Warren, Rhode Island. The church was started in 1789 under the Rev. Daniel Smith and was the first Methodist congregation in Rhode Island, and the second in all New England. The building is a Greek Revival structure with a full temple front built in 1844 by Fall River, Massachusetts architect Perez Mason. The parsonage is a two-story Italianate structure built by the congregation in 1858. It was designed by the Warren firm of Hoar & Drown and built by the related firm of Hoar & Martin.

The two buildings were listed on the National Register of Historic Places in 1971.

== See also ==
- National Register of Historic Places listings in Bristol County, Rhode Island
