= Alfred Drowne Road Historic District =

Historic district in Rhode Island, United States

- U.S. National Register of Historic Places
- U.S. Historic district
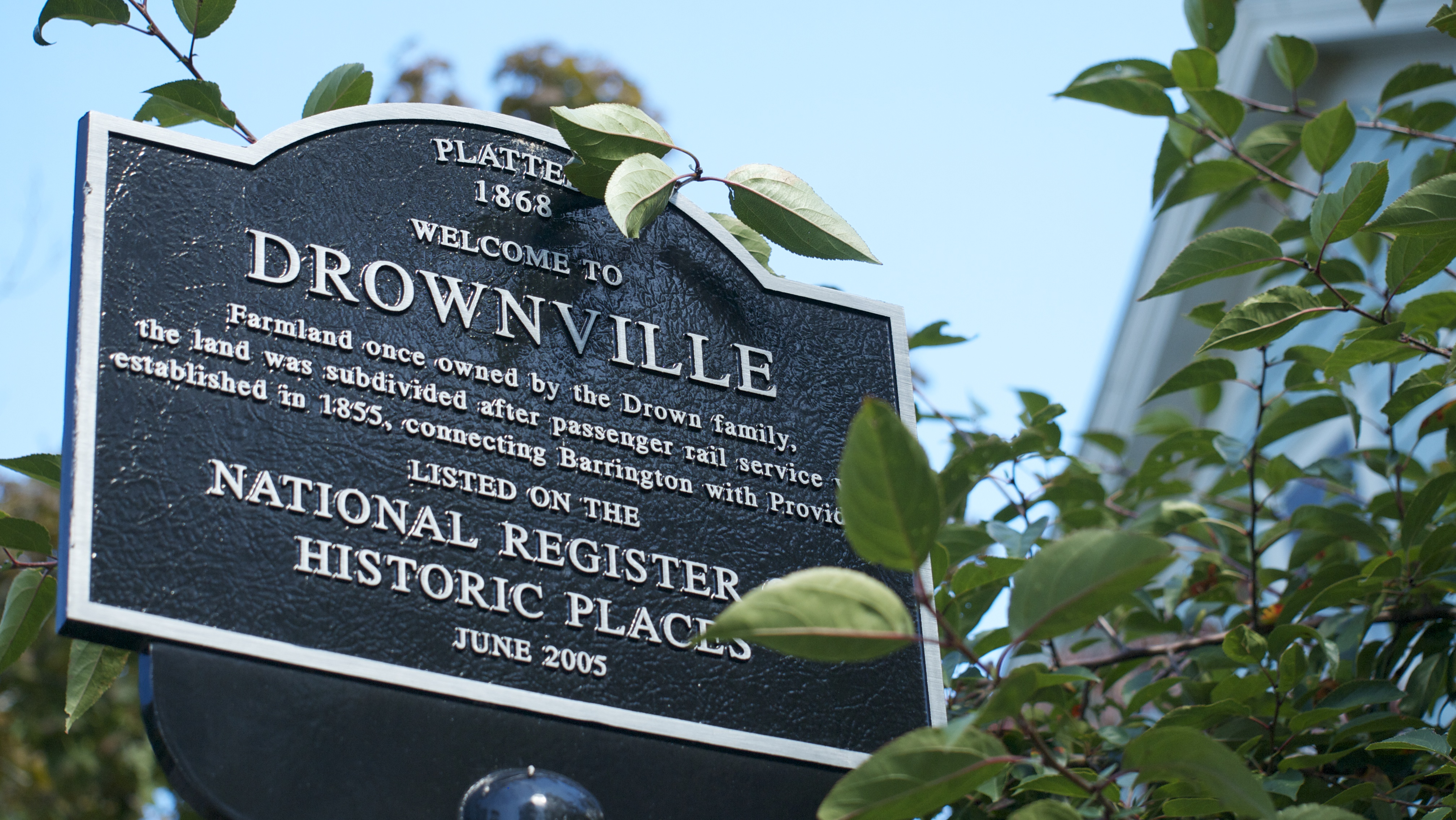
- Plaque for Drowneville along Alfred Drowne Road

- Location within Rhode Island Location within the United States
- Location: Barrington, Rhode Island
- Coordinates: 41°44′31.10″N 71°20′38.60″W
- Area: 27 acres (11 ha)
- Built: 1855
- Architect: Mason, May
- Architectural style: Greek Revival, Italianate
- NRHP reference No.: 05000584
- Added to NRHP: June 10, 2005

The Alfred Drowne Road Historic District of Barrington, Rhode Island, encompasses a suburban area developed between about 1860 and 1910, a period of significant suburban growth in Barrington spurred by the connection of the town by rail to Providence in 1855. This 27-acre (11 ha) residential area was before that time farmland owned by Alfred Drown, whose c. 1830 farmhouse still stands at 13 Alfred Drowne Road. The house of his son Benjamin, built c. 1856, is at number 27. The district includes properties along Alfred Drowne Road, as well as a few properties on Washington Street and Annawamscutt Road which are immediately adjacent.

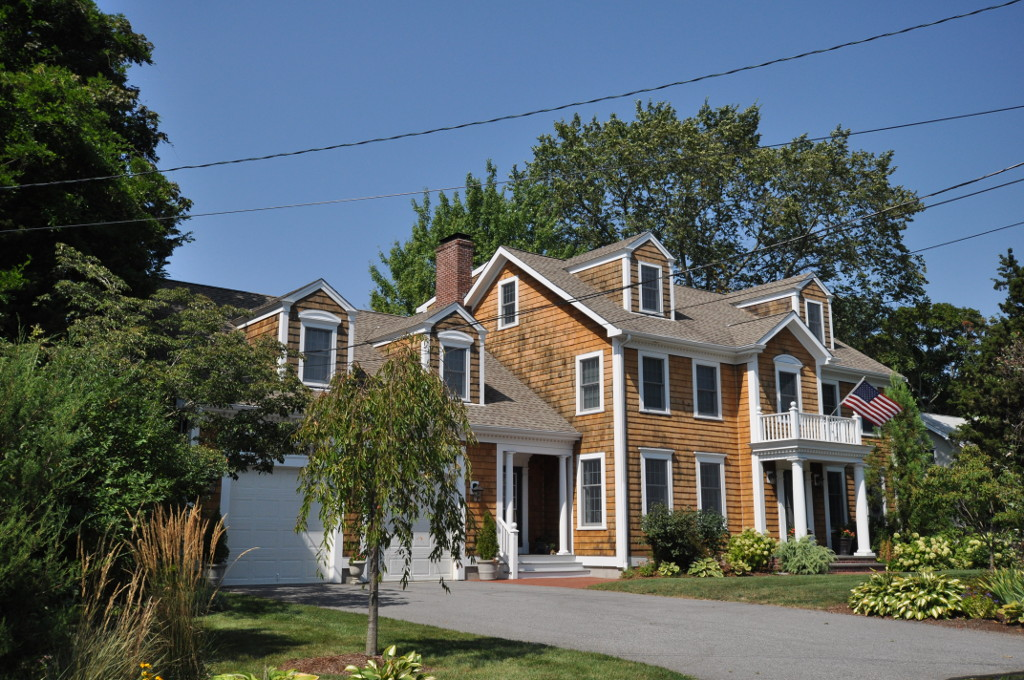

The district was listed on the National Register of Historic Places in 2005.

== See also ==
- National Register of Historic Places listings in Bristol County, Rhode Island
