= Barrington Civic Center Historic District =

Historic district in Rhode Island, United States

Coordinates: 41°44′30″N 71°18′30″W

- Barrington Civic Center
- U.S. National Register of Historic Places
- U.S. Historic district
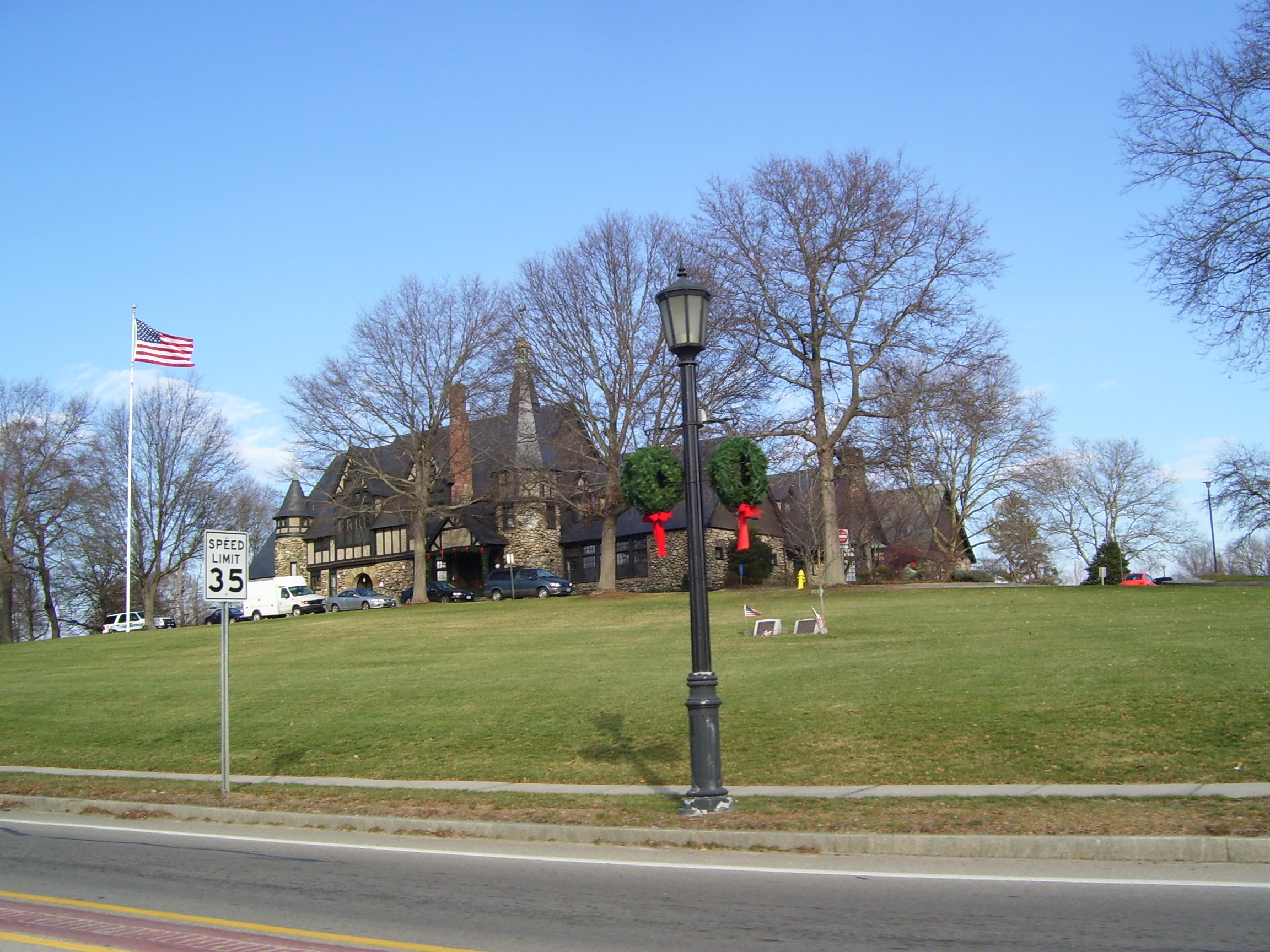
- Barrington Town Hall in 2008

- Location within Rhode Island Location within the United States
- Location: Barrington, Rhode Island
- Built: 1717
- Architect: Stone, Carpenter & Willson; Martin & Hall; Howe & Church; Michael Traficante
- Architectural style: Late Victorian, Tudor Revival
- NRHP reference No.: 76000198
- Added to NRHP: December 12, 1976

Barrington Civic Center Historic District is a historic district in Barrington, Rhode Island on County Road. The district, which consists of the Barrington Town Hall, Leander R. Peck School and Prince's Hill Cemetery, is located on Prince's Hill near the center of Barrington. In 1728, Prince's Hill Cemetery was purchased and later expanded to its present size by 1898. The 1 1/2-story Barrington Town Hall was completed in 1888 and originally served as the seat of the town's government, library and high school. With the completion of the Leander R. Peck School in 1917, the high school moved into the adjacent building and the library used its space. The two-story Elizabethan Revival style Peck School is designed with a T-shaped plan and features a stairway to access the main entrance on the second story. The Peck School was later used by the fifth and sixth-grade elementary students before becoming the public library. Also located within the district is Wood's Pond. The Barrington Civic Center Historic District was added to the National Register of Historic Places in 1976 and serves as a historically significant example of civic and natural environment planning of the late nineteenth century.

== Overview ==
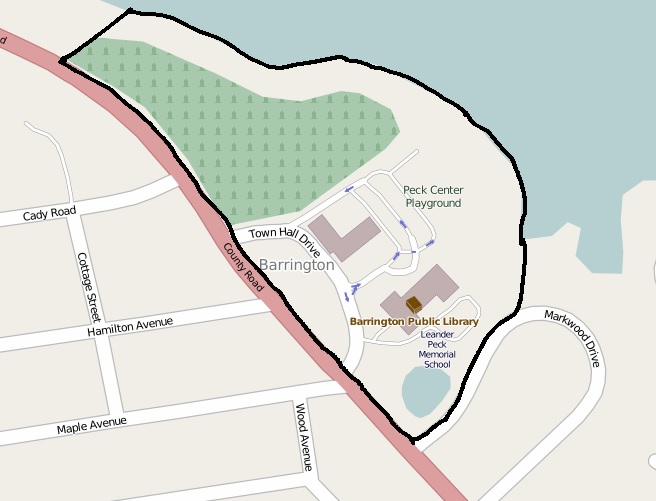
Outline of the Barrington Civic Center boundary

Located in Barrington, Rhode Island on County Road, the Barrington Civic Center Historic District includes the Barrington Town Hall, the Peck School, sports field and tennis court, Wood's pond and Prince's Hill Cemetery. The cemetery dates to the early 18th century, with stones dating from 1728. Bicknell's A History of Barrington, Rhode Island notes under April 7, 1886, that the town voted and approved an appropriation of $2000 for the land to build a town hall. The town hall was completed in 1888 and was originally used as the town's government offices, library and school. In 1917, the high school students transferred to the newly completed and adjacent Peck School.

== Barrington Town Hall ==
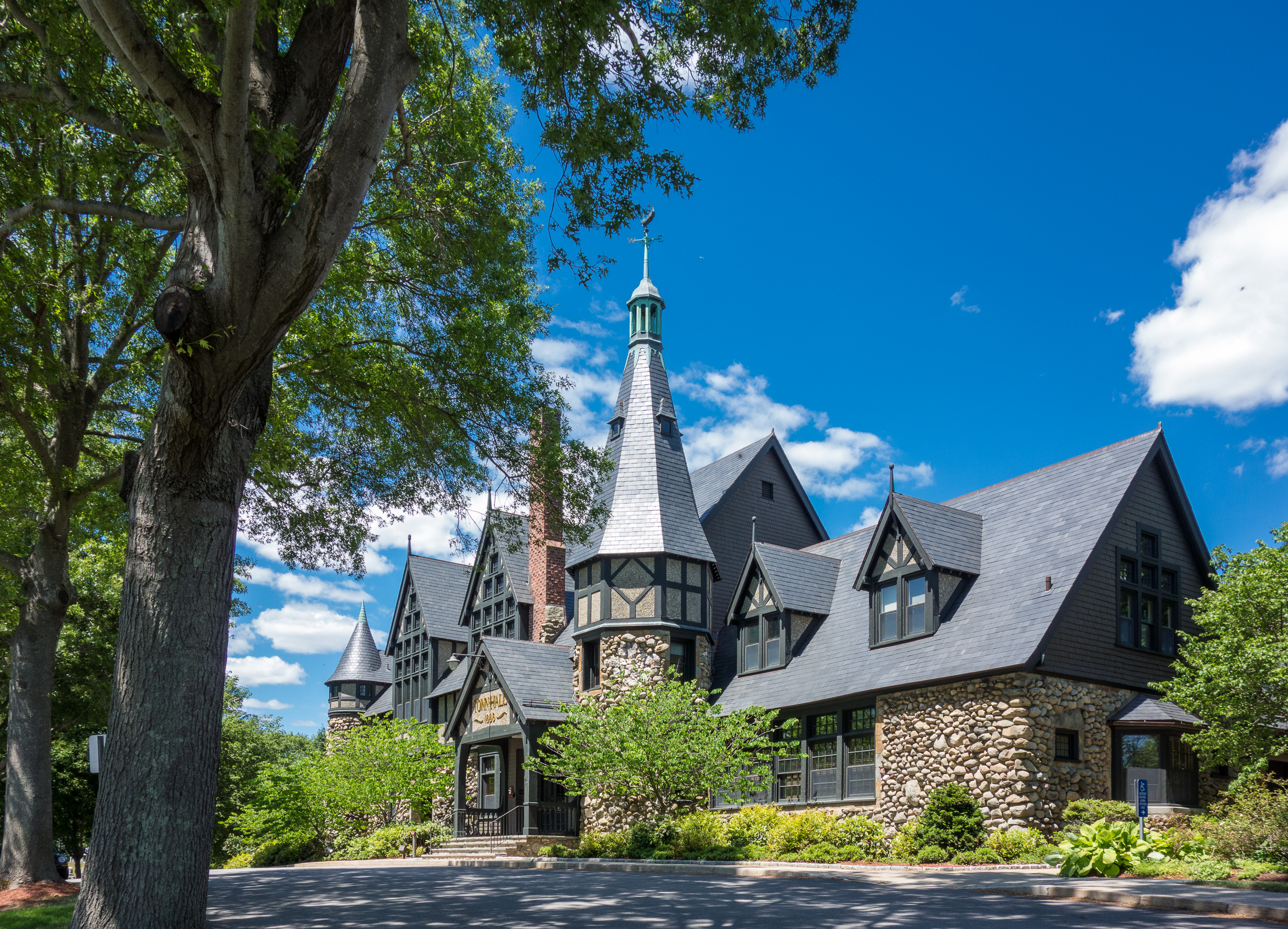
Barrington Town Hall in 2014

The 1 1/2-story Barrington Town Hall was designed and constructed between 1887 and 1888 by Stone, Carpenter & Willson of Providence, Rhode Island with an appropriation of $15,000. The town hall was officially dedicated on December 12, 1888. Constructed on the north-south axis of a ridge Prince's Hill, the town hall's design was self-described as medieval by the architects. Morgan describes the town hall as having "three flank gable units of varying height and depth" and [it] has two circular towers on the front facade of varying height. Morgan notes that "[in the Town Hall,] institutional functions are given something of a domestic architectural character, for the building suggests an expansive house in a half-timbered manorial style." The basement, first and portions of the second story of the Town Hall are constructed of fieldstone. Some of the stones are inscribed as memorials and one stone is claimed to have originated from Plymouth Rock. The second story, below the eaves, is half-timbered. The center of the building features planned irregularity with two large projecting dormer-gables, a chimney to the left of a projecting entrance porch. The southern gable, facing the front, also has two projecting dormers. The southern tower is topped by a copper weather vane with an elaborate three-mast ship.

According to Morgan, the town hall was designed for multiple uses and this is evident from the plans and the exterior of the building. The largest section, the center section, serves as the government function and has municipal offices on the first floor. A stairwell to the right leads to the second floor, which functions as a town meeting room. A secondary entrance on the western facade accesses the northern section of the building, previously a library. The southern section of the building was previously a high school with separate entrances for boys and girls. The second floor of the southern section was used by the Antiquarian Society for meetings and its collections. In 1917, the original library was moved to the southern section following the completion of the Leander R. Peck School. Two additions to the town hall were made to expand the library. The two additions consisted of two parallel gable units that matched the original material and form of the town hall, the first addition was made in 1938 by Howe & Church and the second in 1963 by Michael Traficante.

== School and library ==
The Leander R. Peck School was donated to the Town of Barrington by Sarah Gould Peck in memory of her husband, Leander Remington Peck. A committee was formed to oversee the project and construction began in the spring of 1916. It was designed by Martin & Hall of Providence, Rhode Island, and constructed by Wilmarth and Mackillop of Pawtucket, Rhode Island. The two-story Elizabethan Revival school is made of red Barrington brick with Indiana limestone trim and topped with a gable roof. Designed with a T-shaped plan, the main entrance at the top of the "T" is accessed on a second-story terrace reached via a large double stairway. The flanks have large projecting gable pavilions which include offices for the principal and superintendent. The central hallway is 14 feet (4.3 m) in width and is lined with classrooms on the first floor and the second floor has an assembly room and two recitation rooms. The full basement of the school includes the gymnasium and locker rooms. The building was opened on September 14, 1917. Additions to the school were made in 1924 and 1935 on the east. In the 1970s, these additions were used as a cafeteria and stage. By 1976, the Peck School was used as an elementary school for fifth and sixth graders. Later the school was renamed and re-purposed as the Barrington Public Library. The Barrington Preservation Society uses the lower level as a museum and for the storage of records.

== Prince's Hill Cemetery ==
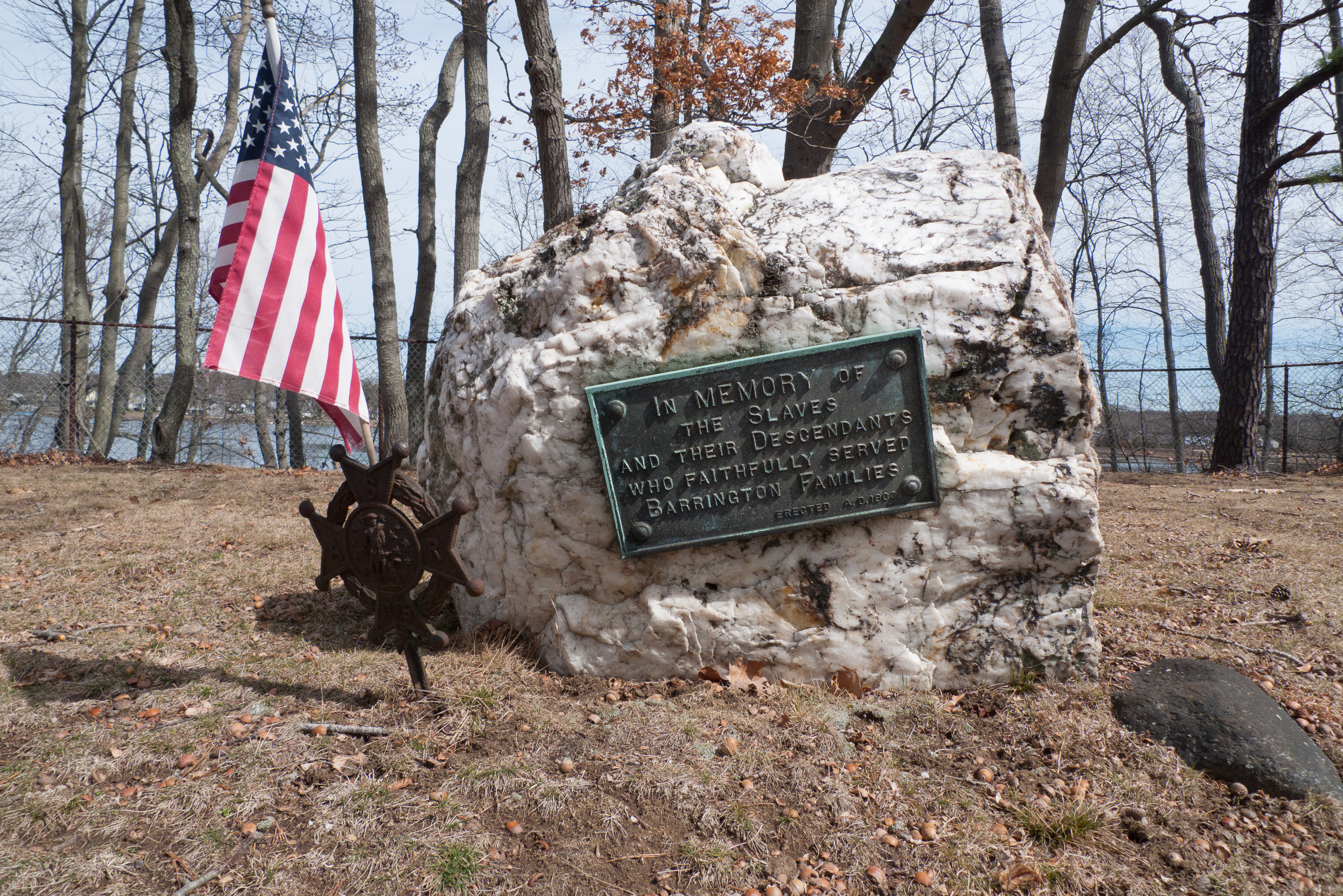
This stone marker in Princes Hill Cemetery reads: "In memory of the Slaves and their Descendants who faithfully served Barrington Families."

Located in the northwest half of the historic district is the Prince's Hill Cemetery. According to Morgan, "[a]t a town meeting on January 18, 1728–29, a committee of Timothy Wadsworth, Lieutenant Peck, Zachariah Bicknell, and James Smith was empowered to purchase land on Prince's Hill from Ebenezer Allen to lay out a burying ground for the recently erected Congregational Church..." The earliest stones are located in the narrow northern end of the cemetery and date to 1728. The cemetery was first expanded on December 31, 1729, with the purchase of a half-acre for five pounds sterling. It would expand four more times by 1898 to encompass more than four acres. In 1849, the cemetery was fenced in and Morgan describes it as "presently exemplifies the "rural cemetery" tradition of the nineteenth century with meandering drives and natural landscape planting." Markers of note include the Ward family marker, consisting of a "large rugged cross and an ethereal angel", a 1903 stone marker dedicated to the slaves of the Barrington families and a Classical Revival crypt dating to 1909.

== Importance ==
According to the National Register of Historic Places, the Barrington Civic Center Historic District is significant as it represents the "historical concentration of public and governmental functions in the Prince's Hill area of Barrington... [and as] a unit, the cemetery, town hall and school, and Wood's Pond, epitomize the late nineteenth-century interest in a planned natural environment." Barrington was transformed by a tripling of its population from 1840 to 1900, going from a rural to a suburban environment. From 1881, the development of the land was regulated by the Barrington Rural Improvement Society, and the historic district serves as evidence of its planning. Morgan notes that a train station just south of Prince's Hill influenced the decision for the construction of civic buildings. The historic district still "show[s] the imprint of early civic pride and planning". It was added to the register in 1976.

== See also ==
- National Register of Historic Places listings in Bristol County, Rhode Island
