= St. Matthew's Episcopal Church (Barrington, Rhode Island) =

Historic church in Rhode Island, United States

- U.S. National Register of Historic Places
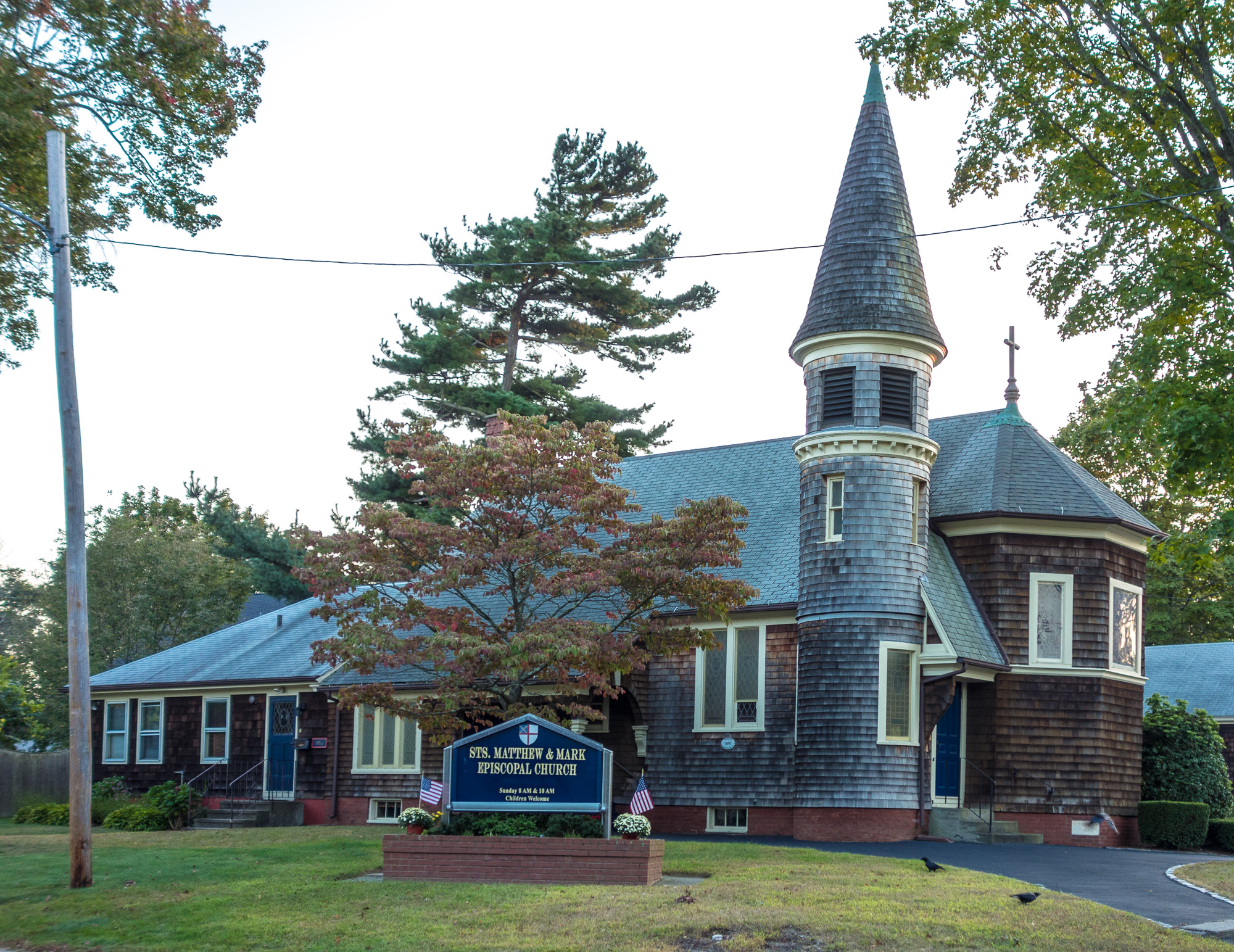

- Location within Rhode Island Location within the United States
- Location: Barrington, Rhode Island
- Coordinates: 41°44′34″N 71°20′37″W
- Area: less than one acre
- Built: 1891
- Architect: William R. Walker & Son
- Architectural style: Gothic, Queen Anne
- NRHP reference No.: 91001024
- Added to NRHP: August 22, 1991

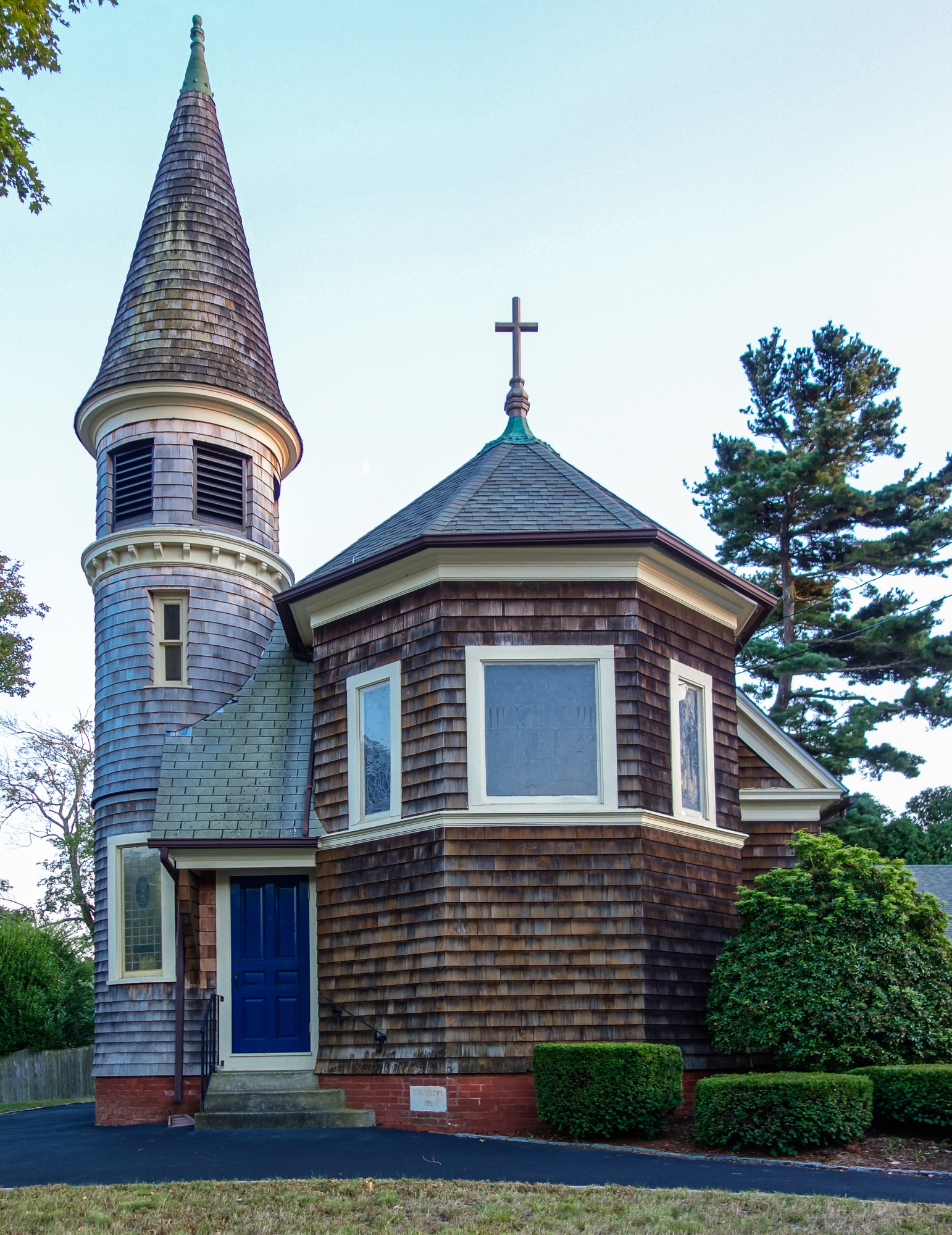
Another view

St. Matthew's Episcopal Church is a historic Episcopal church located at 5 Chapel Road in Barrington, Rhode Island. It is an active parish in the Episcopal Diocese of Rhode Island.

The congregation began as a mission in 1880, and was established as a parish in 1883, under the guidance of the Rev. William Merrick Chapin. The church building was designed by William R. Walker & Son, and built in 1891. It is an eclectic mix of Queen Anne and Gothic Revival style. The attached parish hall was built in 1893. The complex was listed on the National Register of Historic Places in 1991.

St. Matthew and St. Mark, Barrington reported 205 members in 2018 and 126 members in 2023; no membership statistics were reported nationally in 2024 parochial reports. Saint Paul's Church (Pawtucket, Rhode Island) Plate and pledge income reported for the congregation in 2024 was $56,919. Average Sunday attendance (ASA) in 2024 was 35 persons.

== See also ==
- National Register of Historic Places listings in Bristol County, Rhode Island
