= O'Bannon Mill =

- U.S. National Register of Historic Places
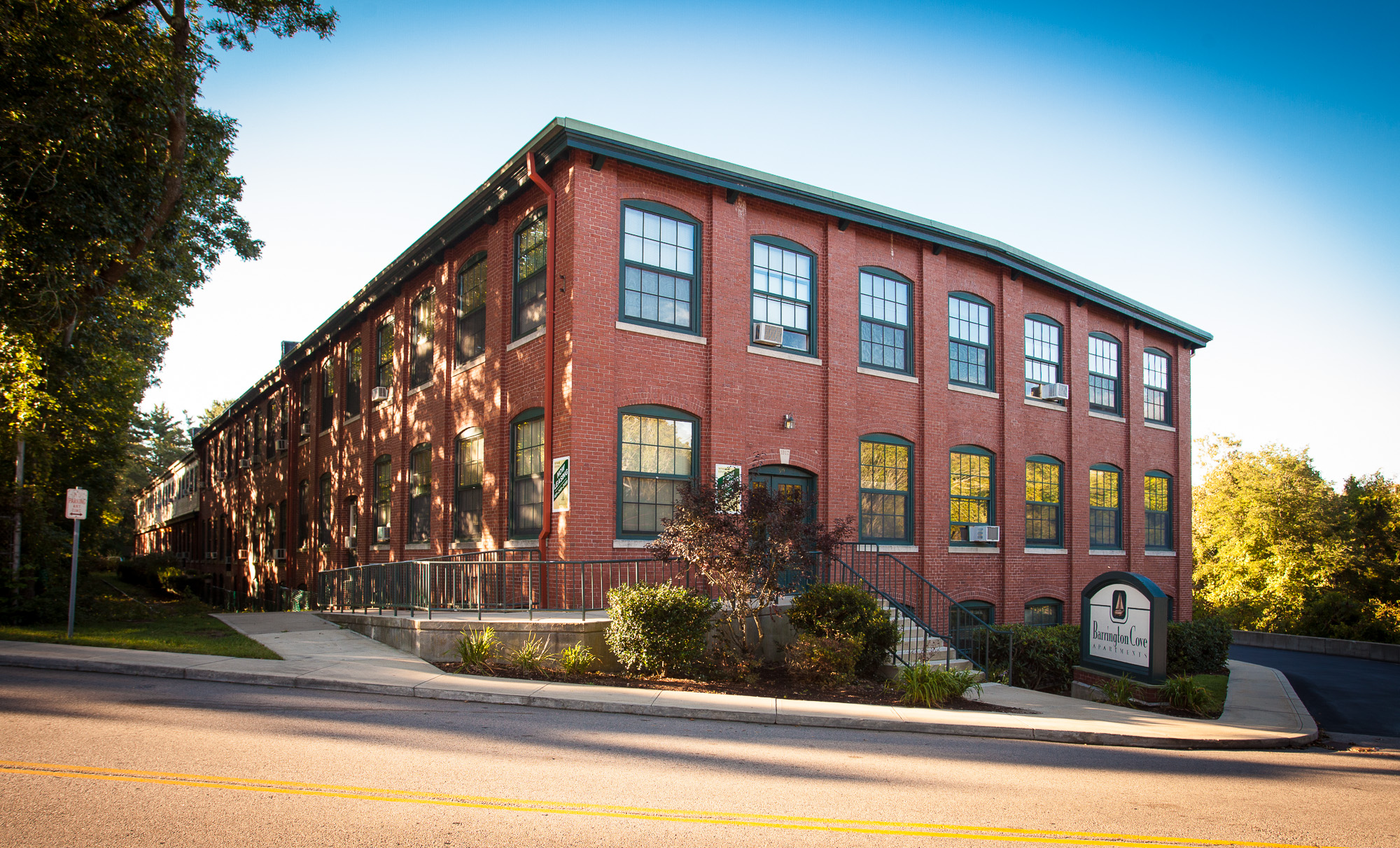

- Location within Rhode Island Location within the United States
- Location: Barrington, Rhode Island
- Coordinates: 41°44′50″N 71°20′43″W
- Area: 2.77 acres (1.12 ha)
- Built: 1905
- NRHP reference No.: 96000891
- Added to NRHP: July 23, 1996

O'Bannon Mill (also known as O'Bannon Corporation Leather Division, or Collins & Aikman Mill) is an historical mill at 90 Bay Spring Avenue in Barrington, Rhode Island. It was one of the first places where artificial leather (using pyroxylin) was manufactured on a large scale.

== History ==
In 1905, George B. Frost founded the Frost Finishing Company and built the original 1905 structure which is part of the current O'Bannon building. Mr. O'Bannon, the treasurer, bought Frost's shares and the mill became the largest manufacturer of imitation leather in the world. O'Bannon went on to acquire other mills arounds Rhode Island and New Jersey. Mr. O'Bannon became incompetent in 1921, died in 1923 and the company went bankrupt in 1926. Cranston Worsted Mills and then Collins & Aikman and finally American Tourister and Piling Chain owned the company until the 1970s. The mill building was converted into elderly apartment housing in the early 1990s, known as the "Barrington Cove Apartments". It was added to the National Register of Historic Places in 1996.

== See also ==
- National Register of Historic Places listings in Bristol County, Rhode Island
