= Allen–West House =

Historic house in Rhode Island, United States

- U.S. National Register of Historic Places
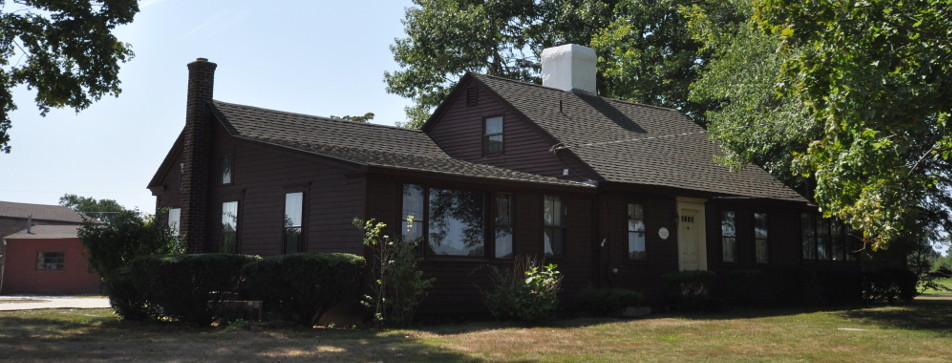

- Location within Rhode Island Location within the United States
- Location: 153 George Street, Barrington, Rhode Island
- Coordinates: 41°46′19″N 71°18′44″W
- Area: 1.4 acres (0.57 ha)
- Built: c. 1763
- Architect: Joseph Allen
- Architectural style: Georgian
- NRHP reference No.: 13000887
- Added to NRHP: December 3, 2013

The Allen–West House is a historic house at 153 George Street in Barrington, Rhode Island. The main block of the two-story timber-frame house was built c. 1763 by Joseph Allen, a housewright. It is one of the older houses in Barrington, hearkening to the days when it was still part of Swansea, Massachusetts, and is a well-preserved rare example of a vernacular square house plan. The house stands amid grounds that were farmed from the 17th to the 20th centuries by the owners of this house, who included members of the Allen family until the mid-19th century, and the Wests until the mid-20th. The house has had two major additions: a kitchen ell added to the east in the 19th century and extended in the 1950s, and a c. 1920s single-story enclosed porch on the west side.

The house was listed on the National Register of Historic Places in 2013.

== See also ==
- National Register of Historic Places listings in Bristol County, Rhode Island
