= Jennys Lane Historic District =

Historic district in Rhode Island, United States

- U.S. National Register of Historic Places
- U.S. Historic district
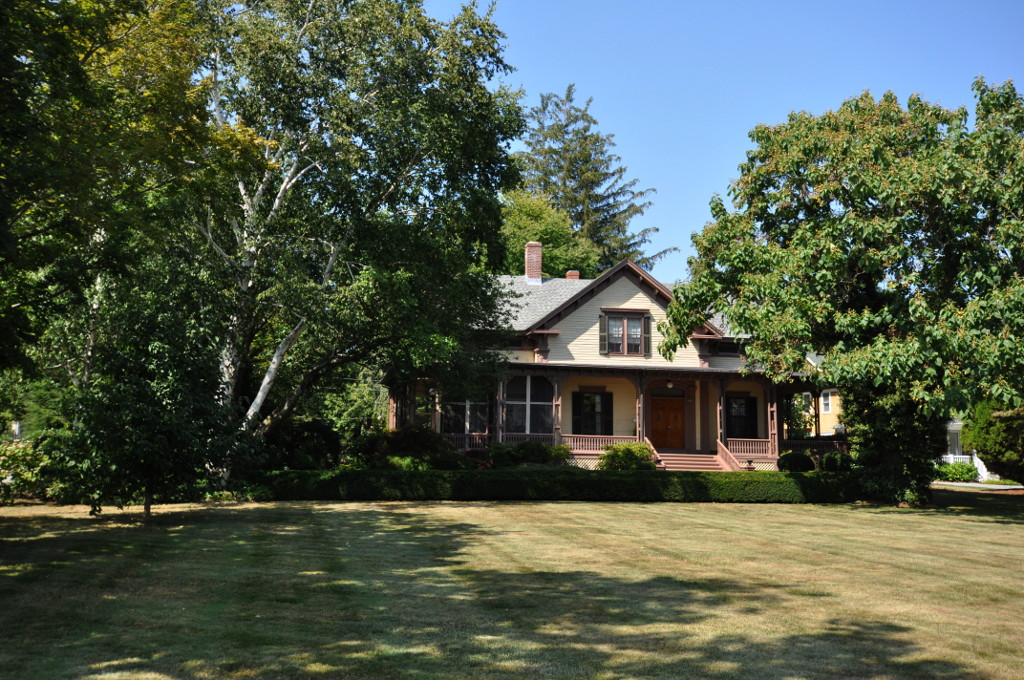
- House at the corner of Jennys Lane and Mathewson Road

- Location within Rhode Island Location within the United States
- Location: Jennys Ln., Mathewson & Rumstick Rds., Barrington, Rhode Island
- Coordinates: 41.73454°N 71.29951°W
- Area: 25 acres (10 ha)
- Architect: Gladding, George Anthony; Fisher, Lewis Thompson
- Architectural style: Mid 19th Century Revival, Late Victorian
- NRHP reference No.: 08000152
- Added to NRHP: March 06, 2008

The Jennys Lane Historic District is a residential historic district encompassing a well-preserved subdivision in Barrington, Rhode Island, which was developed between 1860 and 1920. It is representative of the town's development as a suburb of Providence following the introduction of passenger rail service in 1855. The district includes all of the properties on Jennys Lane, as well as some adjacent houses on Mathewson and Rumstick Roads, as well as a boathouse on Rumstick Road on the banks of the Barrington River.

The district was listed on the National Register of Historic Places in 2008.

== See also ==
- National Register of Historic Places listings in Bristol County, Rhode Island
