= Warren, Rhode Island =

- Town
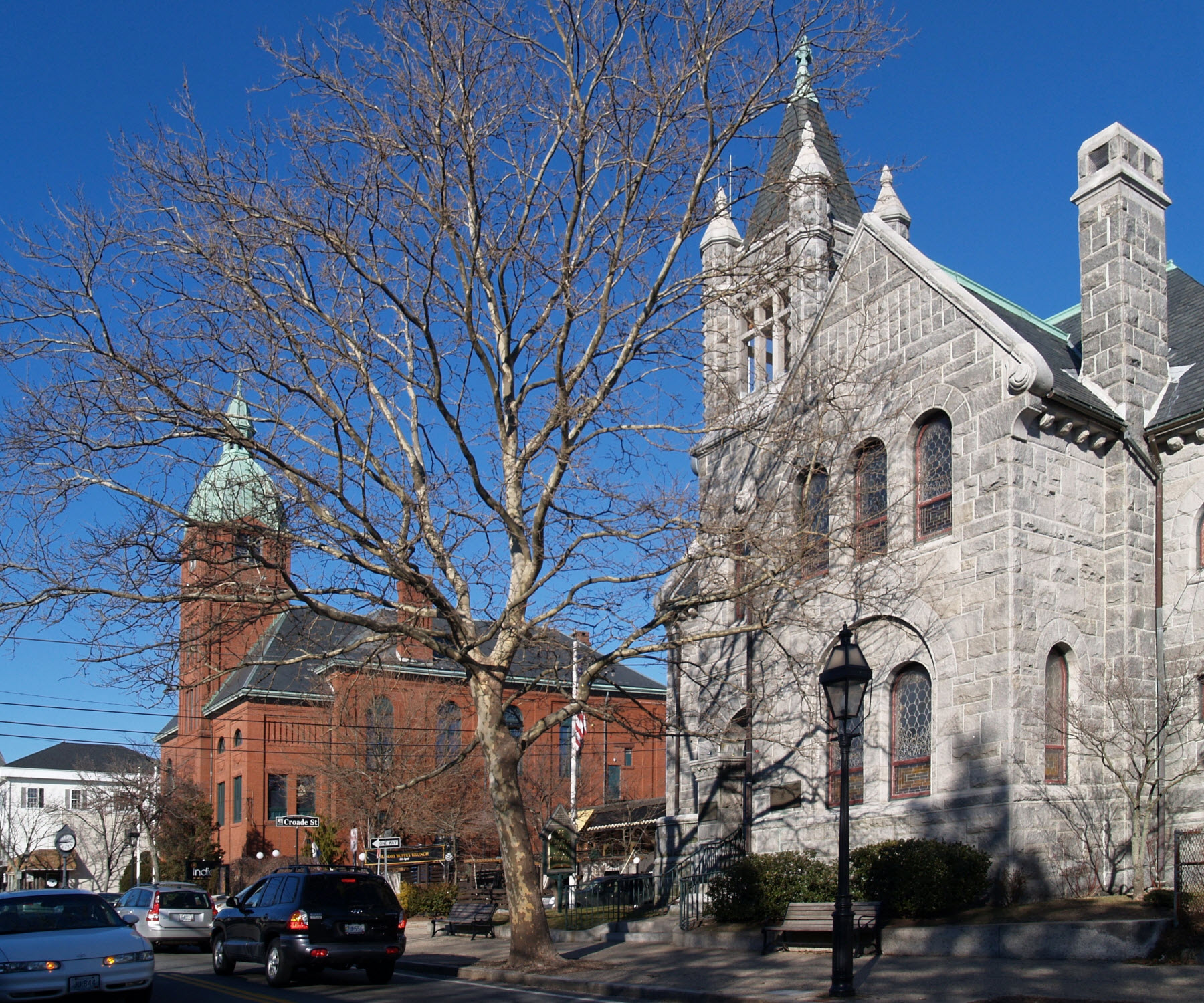
- Main Street, Warren, Rhode Island

- Seal Coat of arms Wordmark

- Location in Bristol County and the state of Rhode Island
- Coordinates: 41°43′50″N 71°16′57″W
- Country: United States
- State: Rhode Island
- County: Bristol
- Settled: 1680
- Incorporated: January 27, 1747

Government
  - Type: Representative town meeting
  - Town Council: Joseph A. DePasquale (I); John W. Hanley (I); Steven P. Calenda (I); P. Brandt Heckert (D); Keri M. Cronin (D)
  - Town Moderator: Pasquale T. Annarummo (D)

Area
  - Total: 8.6 sq mi (22.4 km^{2})
  - Land: 6.1 sq mi (15.9 km^{2})
  - Water: 2.5 sq mi (6.5 km^{2})
- Elevation: 6.6 ft (2 m)

Population (2020)
  - Total: 11,147
  - Density: 1,816/sq mi (701.1/km^{2})
- Time zone: UTC−5 (Eastern (EST))
  - Summer (DST): UTC−4 (EDT)
- ZIP Code: 02885
- Area code: 401
- FIPS code: 25-37175
- GNIS feature ID: 1220057
- Website: www.townofwarren-ri.gov

Warren is a town in Bristol County, Rhode Island, United States. The population was 11,147 at the 2020 census.

== History ==
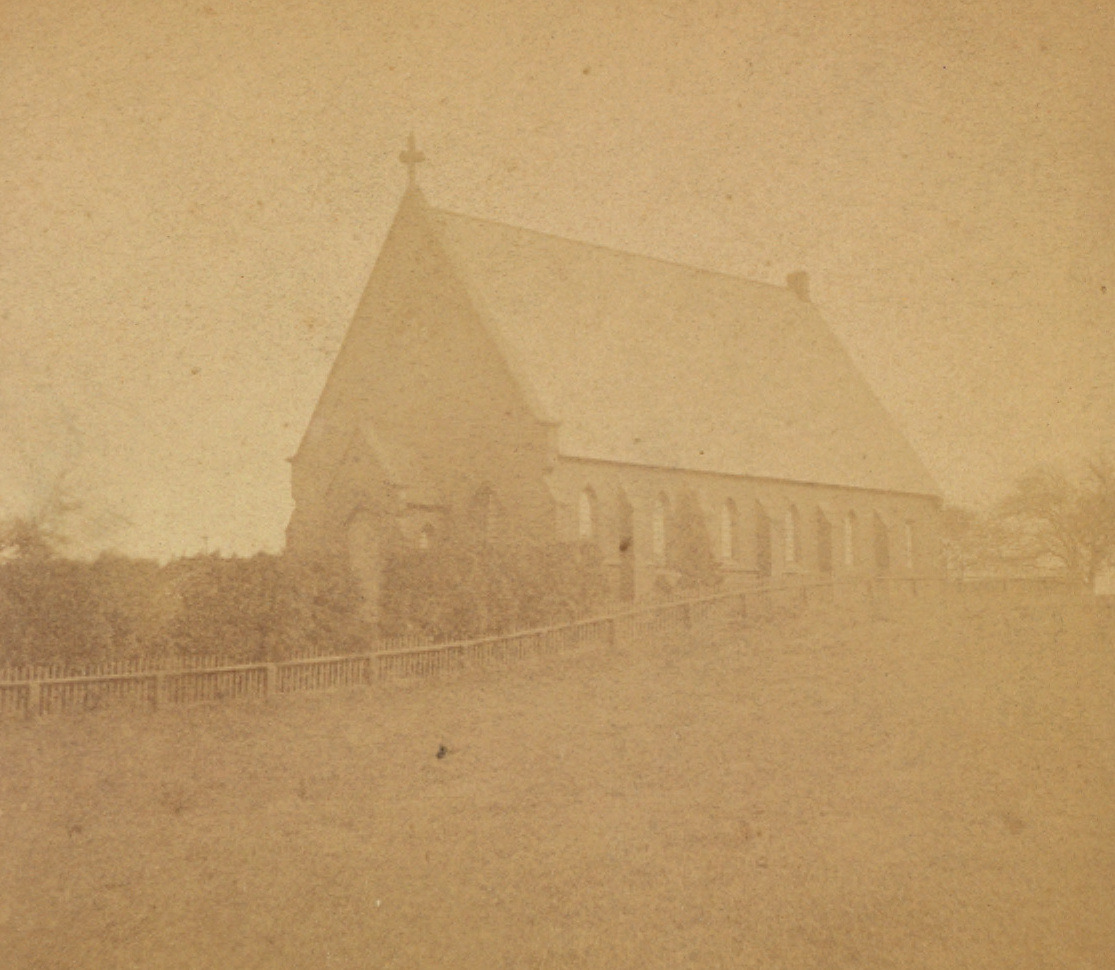
Church at Warren, middle- to late-19th century

Warren was the site of the Pokanoket Indian settlement of Sowams located on a peninsula within the Pokanoket region. The region consisted of over 60 settlements under the authority of Chief Massasoit (sometimes called Osamequin) who controlled the land from Plymouth to the eastern shores of Narragansett Bay. English colonists Edward Winslow and Stephen Hopkins from Plymouth Colony first visited there in July, 1621. Winslow and John Hampden saved Massasoit's life two years later and gained an important ally and lifelong friend. The colonists set up a trading post by 1632 on the banks of the Kickemuit River where they traded English goods for furs and other items. Roger Williams was banished from Salem, Massachusetts, in January, 1636, and fled to Sowams, becoming ill on the way. He was sheltered by Massasoit in Sowams until he recovered over the winter months; he later established Providence Plantations.

Permanent English settlement began east of the Indian village in 1653. Massasoit and his oldest son Wamsutta sold to Plymouth Colony settlers what is now Warren and parts of Barrington, Rhode Island, Swansea, Massachusetts, and Rehoboth, Massachusetts. The land was part of the Massachusetts Bay Colony and was first incorporated as part of Swansea. After the death of Massasoit, however, relations became strained between the Indians and the settlers, leading to King Philip's War in 1675 when the Indians destroyed the settlement at Sowams. In 1668, the township was officially incorporated with the name Sowams; in 1691, the Plymouth Colony merged with the Massachusetts Bay Colony.

Warren was ceded to Rhode Island from Massachusetts in 1747 along with the Attleborough Gore (now Cumberland), Barrington, Bristol, Tiverton, and Little Compton, Rhode Island. The town was named "Warren" after British naval hero Admiral Sir Peter Warren after a victory at Louisburg in 1745. Barrington was unified with Warren at the time, until it was separated again in 1770.

Warren was the original home of Brown University, founded in 1764 as the College in the English Colony of Rhode Island and Providence Plantations. The school registered its first students in 1765 and was the Baptist answer to Congregationalist Yale and Harvard, Presbyterian Princeton, and Episcopalian Penn and Columbia. It was the only one of these schools that welcomed students of all religious persuasions, following the example of Roger Williams, who founded Rhode Island in 1636 on the same principle.

In the mid-18th century, the town was well known as a whaling port, and ship building became an important industry. The American Revolutionary War seriously affected Warren's commercial prosperity, and the town was subject to British raids in 1778 along with the rest of the region. Commerce revived within the decade after the Revolution until the middle of the 19th century, and Warren was famous for the fine vessels launched from its yards. These vessels were largely commanded and operated by Warren crews, and they engaged in whaling, merchant service, and the West India trade. Three notable ships were built in Warren by Chase & Davis: the 1853 clipper Lookout, the 1853 clipper bark Gem of the Sea, and the 1854 clipper bark Mary Ogden.

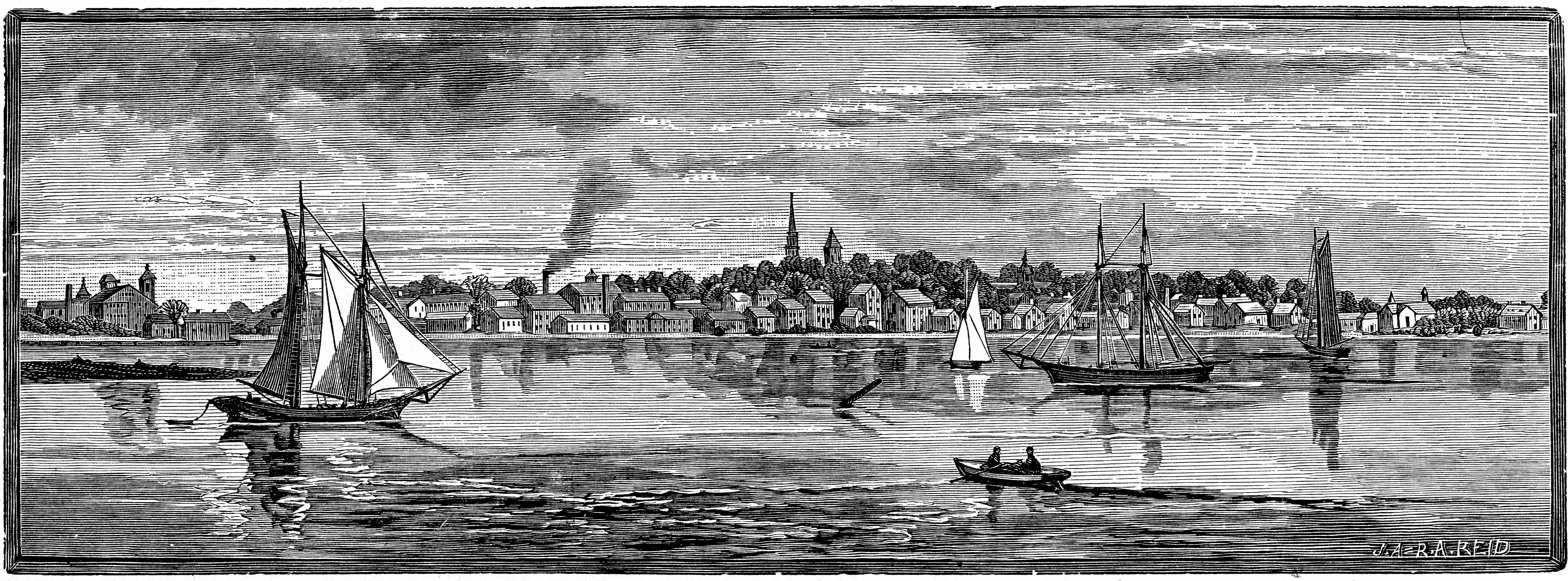
1886 engraving of Warren

With the decline of the whaling industry and related seafaring commerce toward the middle of the 19th century, business attention turned to textile manufacturing. Warren's first cotton mill was erected by the Warren Manufacturing Company in 1847. Further mills and factories developed during and after the Civil War, attracting an immigrant work force. Today, Warren is home to several waterfront businesses such as Blount Marine, Blount Seafood, and Dyer Boats.

== Geography ==
According to the United States Census Bureau, the town has a total area of 8.6 square miles (22 km^{2}), of which 6.2 square miles (16 km^{2}) is land and 2.5 square miles (6.5 km^{2}) (28.90%) is water. Warren is located on the east bank of the Warren River (opposite Barrington, Rhode Island). The weather in January is very low going at its highest of 38° and a low of 27°, as the months go the higher the weather gets as in July it gets a high of 79° and a low of 69°, then it starts to drop as the years go and then at the end of the month (December) it reaches a high of 43° and a low of 33°.

== Demographics ==
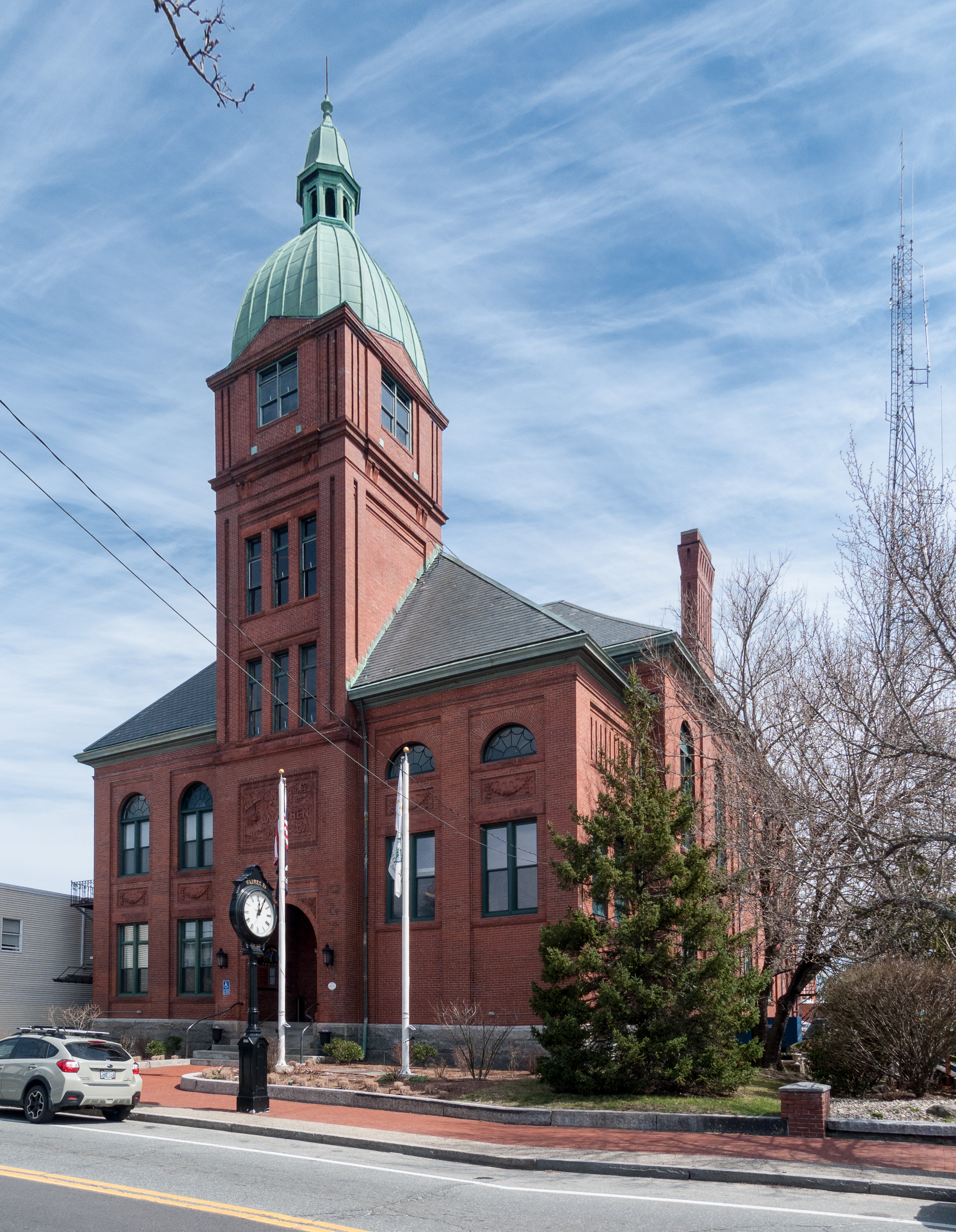
Town Hall

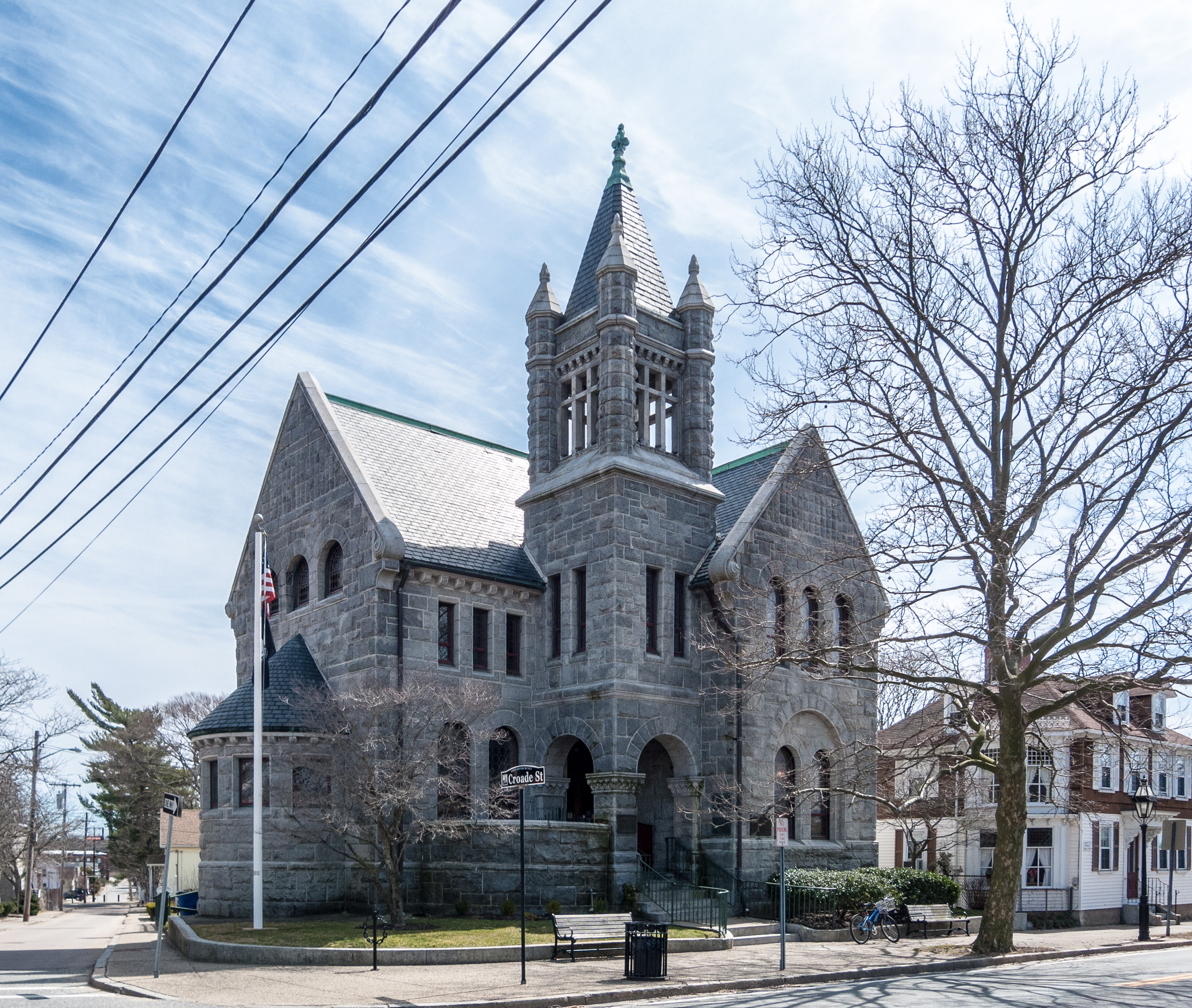
Library

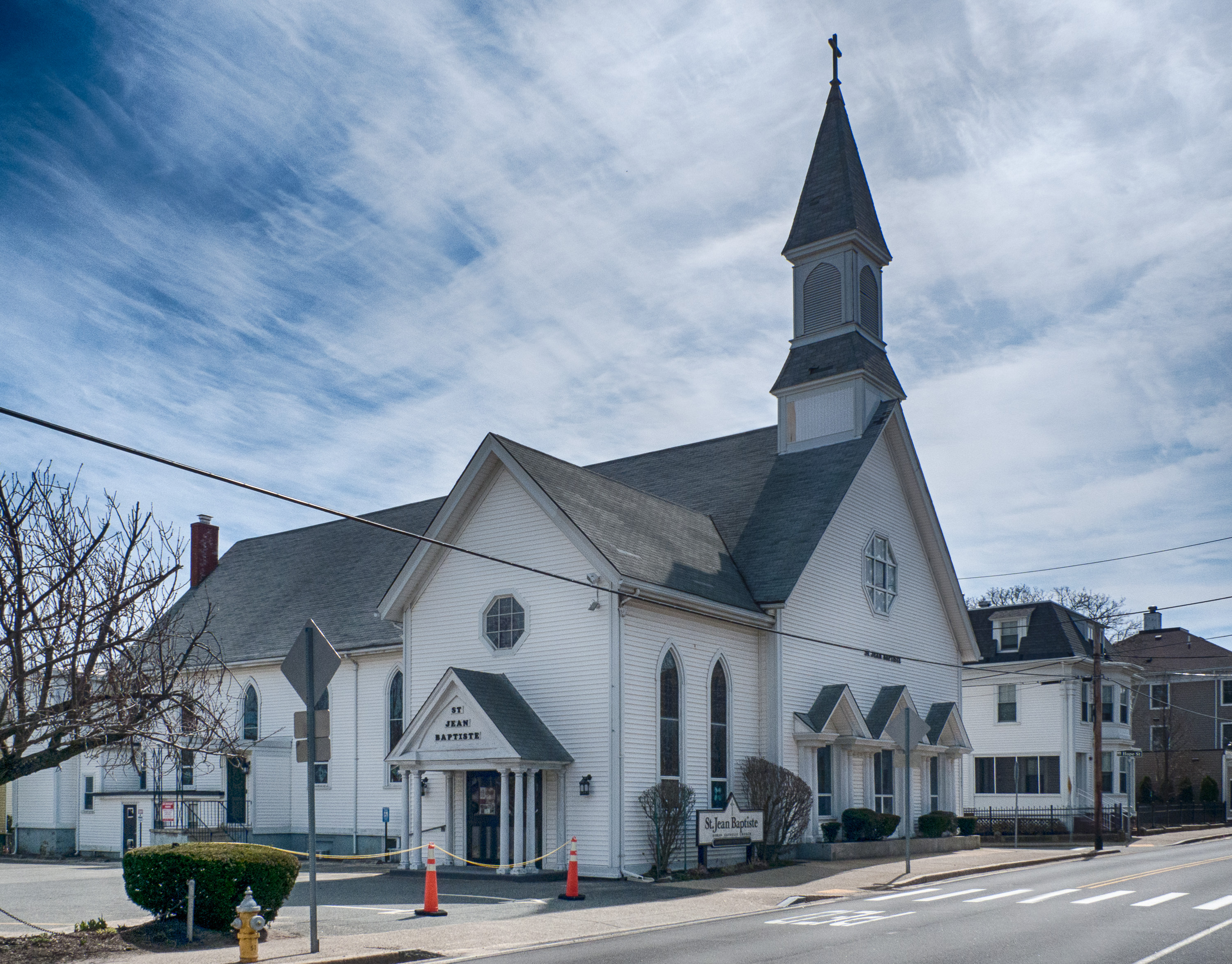
St. Jean Baptiste Church

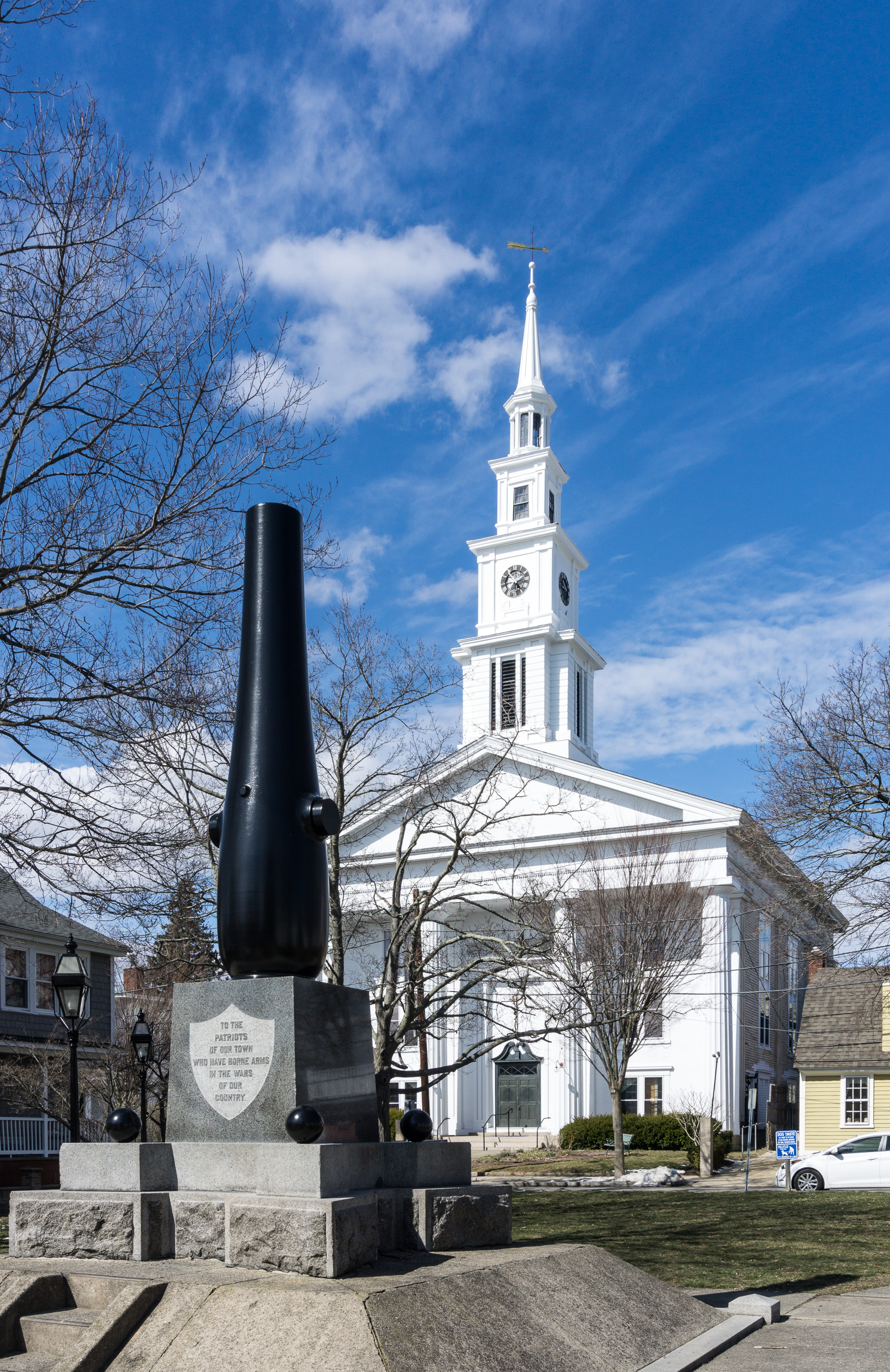
Warren Common

Historical population
| Census | Pop. | Note | %± |
|---|---|---|---|
| 1790 | 1,122 | | — |
| 1800 | 1,473 | | 31.3% |
| 1810 | 1,775 | | 20.5% |
| 1820 | 1,806 | | 1.7% |
| 1830 | 1,800 | | −0.3% |
| 1840 | 2,437 | | 35.4% |
| 1850 | 3,103 | | 27.3% |
| 1860 | 2,636 | | −15.0% |
| 1870 | 3,008 | | 14.1% |
| 1880 | 4,007 | | 33.2% |
| 1890 | 4,489 | | 12.0% |
| 1900 | 5,108 | | 13.8% |
| 1910 | 6,585 | | 28.9% |
| 1920 | 7,841 | | 19.1% |
| 1930 | 7,974 | | 1.7% |
| 1940 | 8,158 | | 2.3% |
| 1950 | 8,513 | | 4.4% |
| 1960 | 8,750 | | 2.8% |
| 1970 | 10,523 | | 20.3% |
| 1980 | 10,640 | | 1.1% |
| 1990 | 11,385 | | 7.0% |
| 2000 | 11,360 | | −0.2% |
| 2010 | 10,611 | | −6.6% |
| 2020 | 11,147 | | 5.1% |
U.S. Decennial Census

As of the census of 2020, there were 11,147 people and 4,962 households in the town. The population density was 1,810.2 inhabitants per square mile (698.9/km^{2}). There were 5,495 housing units in the town. The racial makeup of the town was 90.38% White, 1.66% African American, 0.26% Native American, 1.11% Asian, 0.00% Pacific Islander, 1.24% from other races, and 5.35% from two or more races. Hispanic or Latino of any race were 3.24% of the population.

There were 4,962 households, out of which 17.5% had children under the age of 18 living with them, 42.0% were married couples living together, 29.5% had a female householder with no spouse present, and 21.6% had a male householder with no spouse present. Of all households, 16.2% were made up of individuals, and 6.0% had someone living alone who was 65 years of age or older. The average household size was 2.20 and the average family size was 2.96.

In the town, the population was spread out, with 13.4% under the age of 18, 7.5% from 18 to 24, 25.8% from 25 to 44, 28.8% from 45 to 64, and 24.5% who were 65 years of age or older. The median age was 48.5 years.

The median income for a household in the town was $89,722, and the median income for a family was $122,807. The per capita income for the town was $50,745. About 9.2% of the population were below the poverty line, including 3.5% of those under age 18 and 14.4% of those age 65 or over.

== Government ==
Warren town vote by party in presidential elections
| Year | GOP | DEM | Others |
|---|---|---|---|
| 2016 | 39.33% 1,987 | 53.15% 2,685 | 7.52% 380 |
| 2012 | 34.78% 1,688 | 63.01% 3,058 | 2.20% 107 |
| 2008 | 34.54% 1,760 | 63.85% 3,254 | 1.61% 82 |
| 2004 | 38.17% 1,835 | 59.93% 2,881 | 1.89% 91 |
| 2000 | 31.02% 1,446 | 62.74% 2,925 | 6.24% 291 |
| 1996 | 25.95% 1,177 | 60.79% 2,757 | 13.25% 601 |
| 1992 | 29.27% 1,544 | 46.03% 2,428 | 24.70% 1,303 |
| 1988 | 45.57% 2,120 | 54.02% 2,513 | 0.41% 19 |

Warren is a part of the 10th District in the Rhode Island Senate and is currently represented by Democrat Walter Felag Jr. The town is a part of Rhode Island's 1st congressional district at the federal level and is presently represented by Democrat Gabe Amo. It is a reliably Democratic stronghold in presidential elections, as no Republican has carried the town in over four decades.

== Notable places ==
- East Bay Bike Path
- Warren United Methodist Church and Parsonage
- Warren Waterfront Historic District

== Notable people ==
- Lou Abbruzzi, NFL football player
- Pat Abbruzzi, All-Star Canadian football player, RI football legend
- F. Nelson Blount, founder of the Blount Seafood Corporation and steam locomotive collector
- Luther Blount, started Blount Marine, American Canadian Caribbean Cruise Lines and Bay Queen Cruises
- Hezekiah Butterworth, an American writer of books for young people, and a poet
- Jo-Jo Morrissey, infielder for the Cincinnati Reds and Chicago White Sox
- Elizabeth "Lizzie" Murphy, "The Queen of Baseball"—the first woman to play professional baseball competing with male athletes
