= Nayatt Point Light =

Lighthouse in Rhode Island, United States

- Nayatt Point Lighthouse
- U.S. National Register of Historic Places
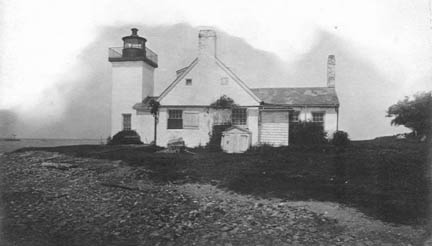
- Nayatt Point Lighthouse, ca. late 1800s

- Location within Rhode Island Location within the United States
- Location: Barrington, Rhode Island
- Coordinates: 41°43′30″N 71°20′23″W
- Built: 1828
- MPS: Lighthouses of Rhode Island TR
- NRHP reference No.: 87001694
- Added to NRHP: February 25, 1988

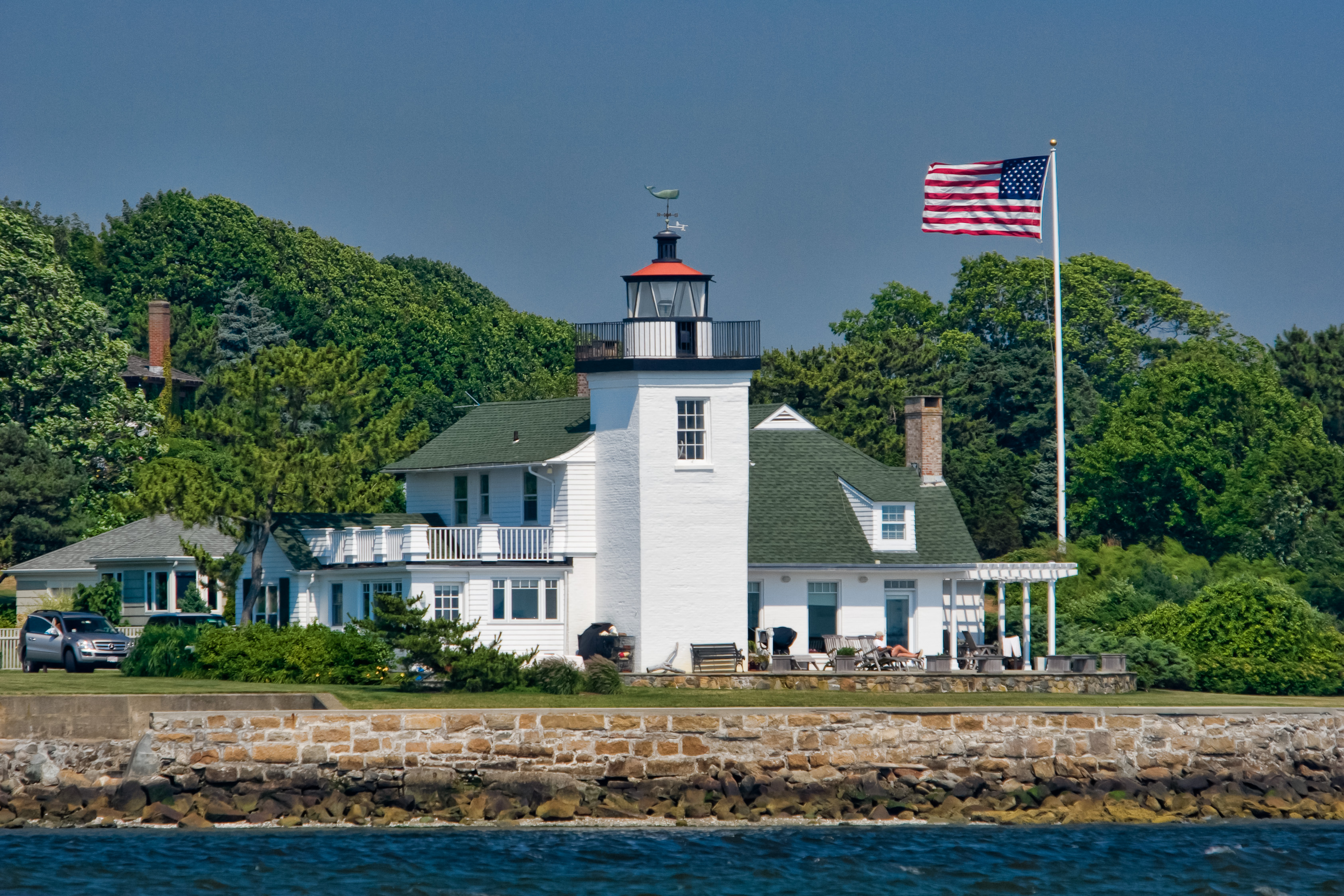
Nayatt Point Light in 2007

Nayatt Point Light is a historic lighthouse in Barrington, Rhode Island.

The current light was built of brick in 1856 and contains an 1828 keeper's house. The lighthouse was added to the National Register of Historic Places in 1988.

== First light ==
On May 23, 1828, the United States Congress appropriated $3,500 for a lighthouse to mark the narrow passage between Nayatt Point and a shoal extending from Conimicut Point." Required by law to accept the lowest bid for the project, the government was forced to enter into the contract with William Halloway and Westgate Watson for the construction regardless of the qualifications of the contractors. This obligation was confirmed by Stephen Pleasonton of the U.S. Treasury Department, confirming the authorization to enter into the contract with Halloway and Watson. The tower was poorly constructed and was difficult to navigate for the lightkeepers.

== List of keepers ==
This list includes known keepers, but may not be exhaustive.

Name	Year	Reference	Service Notes
Daniel Wightman	1828-1845		
John M. Carrie	1845-1849		
Lewis B. Smith	1849-1852		
Noel A. Mathewson	1852-1853		
Wilmouth Heath	1853-1860		
John Clark	1860-1861		
A. W. Tripp	1861-1865		
Davis Perry	1865-1868		

== See also ==
- List of lighthouses in Rhode Island
- National Register of Historic Places listings in Bristol County, Rhode Island
