= Warren Waterfront Historic District =

Historic district in Rhode Island, United States

- U.S. National Register of Historic Places
- U.S. Historic district
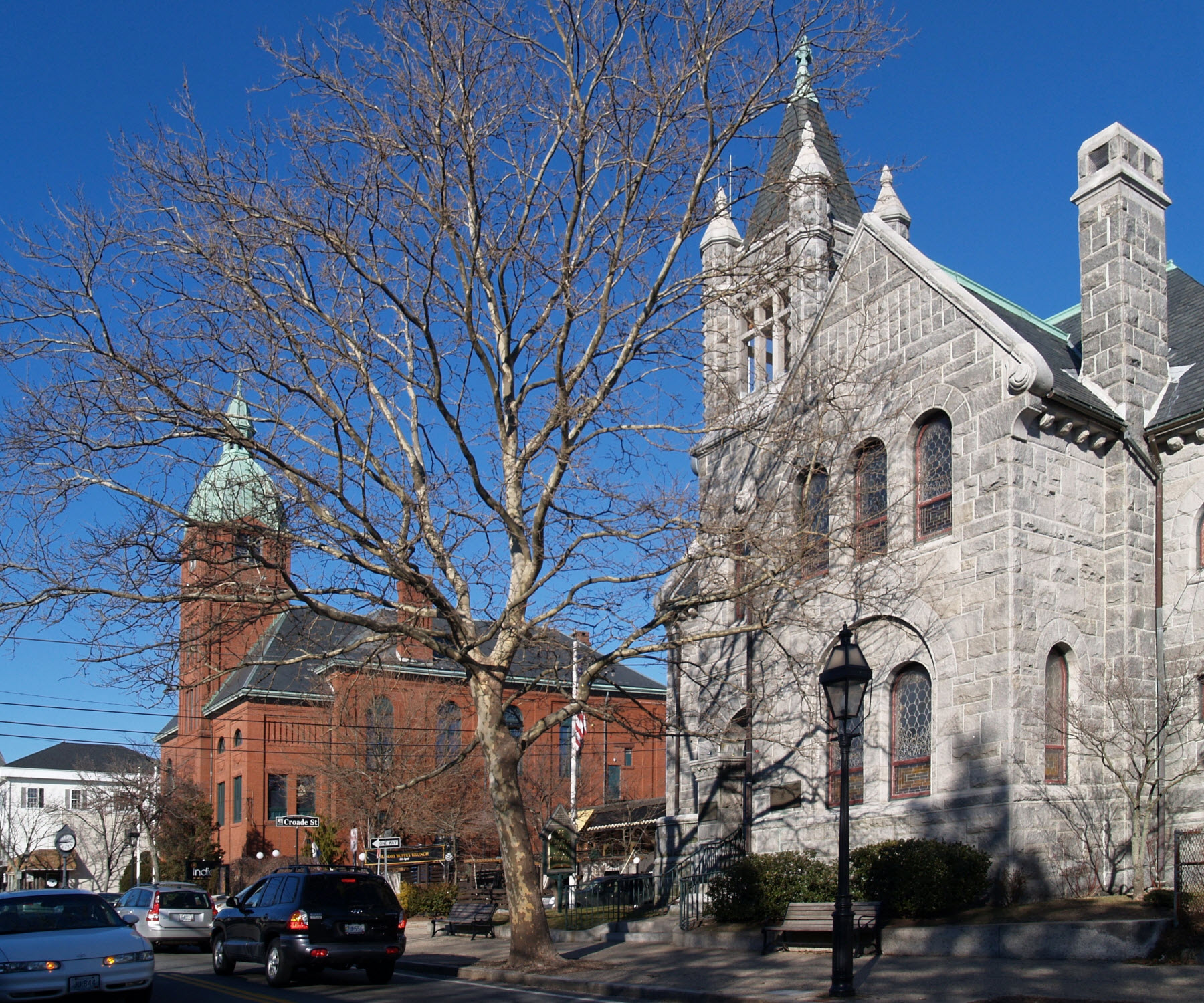

- Location within Rhode Island Location within the United States
- Location: Warren, Rhode Island
- Coordinates: 41°43′51″N 71°17′4″W
- Area: 165 acres (67 ha)
- Architect: Russell Warren; William R. Walker & Son
- Architectural style: Mid 19th Century Revival, Late 19th and 20th Century Revivals, Late Victorian
- NRHP reference No.: 74000035 (original); 03001000 (increase)

Significant dates
- Added to NRHP: February 28, 1974
- Boundary increase: October 3, 2003

The Warren Waterfront Historic District encompasses the center of Warren, Rhode Island. It is bounded on the west by the Warren River, on the north roughly by Belcher Cove, on the east roughly by Federal and Main Streets, and on the south by Campbell Street. This area is a densely built residential, commercial, and civic area that has been the center of Warren since the mid-18th century. The town prospered in the 19th century, first as a whaling and shipbuilding center and later with industrial development. The district includes the town's major civic buildings, as well as a wide variety of housing in 19th century revival and Victorian styles. It was listed on the National Register of Historic Places in 1974, and enlarged in 2003.

== See also ==
- National Register of Historic Places listings in Bristol County, Rhode Island
