= Barrington, Rhode Island =

- Town
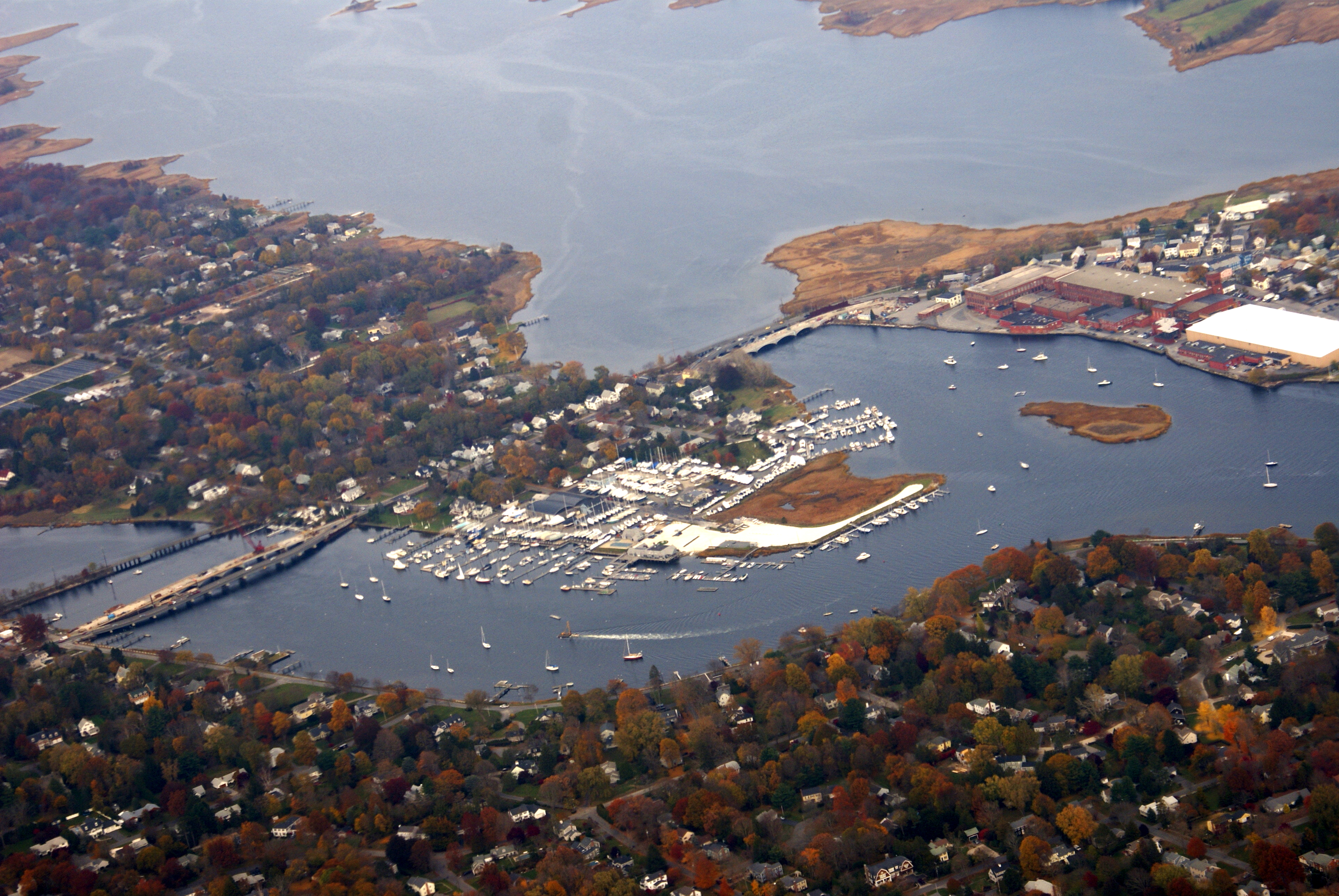
- Aerial view of Barrington in 2008

- Flag Seal Coat of arms Logo

- Location in Bristol County and the state of Rhode Island.

- Location in Rhode Island Barrington (the United States) Barrington (North America)
- Coordinates: 41°44′43″N 71°19′5″W
- Country: United States
- State: Rhode Island
- County: Bristol
- Settled: 1652
- Incorporation (Massachusetts): November 18, 1717
- Annexed to Warren: January 27, 1747
- Incorporation (Rhode Island): June 16, 1770

Government
  - Type: Council-manager
  - Town Moderator: Julia P. Califano (D)

Area
  - Total: 15.4 sq mi (39.9 km^{2})
  - Land: 8.4 sq mi (21.8 km^{2})
  - Water: 7.0 sq mi (18.1 km^{2})
- Elevation: 0 to 49 ft (0 to 15 m)

Population (2020)
  - Total: 17,153
  - Density: 2,038/sq mi (786.8/km^{2})
- Time zone: UTC−5 (Eastern (EST))
  - Summer (DST): UTC−4 (EDT)
- ZIP Code: 02806
- Area code: 401
- FIPS code: 44-05140
- GNIS feature ID: 1220084
- Website: barrington.ri.gov

Barrington is a suburban, residential town in Bristol County, Rhode Island, United States, approximately 7 miles (11 km) southeast of Providence. As of the 2020 United States Census, the population was 17,153.

Barrington was founded by Congregationalist separatists from Swansea, Massachusetts, and incorporated in 1717. It was ceded from Massachusetts to Rhode Island and merged into Warren in 1747, and in 1770 made into a separate town by the Rhode Island legislature. It was a sparsely developed, agricultural community until the arrival of brickmaking companies in the 1850s, which employed large numbers of French-Canadians and Italians. The construction of a railroad to Providence in 1855 further contributed to suburban development, attracting residents of neighboring urban areas and contributing to the development of manufacturing industries. The post–World War II baby boom increased suburbanization trends, resulting in a large population increase.

Historical sites provide examples of architectural and suburban development during various stages of the town's history, including the Allen-West House, Barrington Civic Center Historic District, and O'Bannon Mill. Nine sites in Barrington are listed under the National Register of Historic Places.

== History ==
Barrington was originally occupied by the Wampanoag Indians, whose territory spread from Narragansett Bay to Cape Cod. But epidemics largely eliminated their coastal settlements, and their main settlement was roughly Bristol, Barrington, and Warren, Rhode Island at the time of the Pilgrims' arrival in 1620. The Narragansetts called the area Sowams. In 1653, investors from Plymouth Colony bought "Sowams and Parts Adjacent" from the Wampanoags, corresponding to Barrington and parts of Bristol, Warren, and Swansea, Massachusetts. Some areas in Barrington draw their name from the initial proprietors of this land, such as Prince's Hill, named for Thomas Prince.

Religious differences between settlers of Sowams and the neighboring Wannamoissett and Rehoboth prompted the incorporation of Swansea in 1667. Plymouth created Bristol County in 1685 to improve administration of western lands, which was followed by a merger of the Plymouth and Massachusetts Bay colonies orchestrated by the British government. Baptist residents petitioned for separation from Swansea in 1711, and Barrington was incorporated as an independent town in 1717. Barrington likely received its name from Barrington, Somerset, the origin of several settlers. Barrington was ceded to Rhode Island in 1747 and made a part of Warren. In 1770, the Rhode Island legislature made Barrington a separate town.

=== Townhood ===
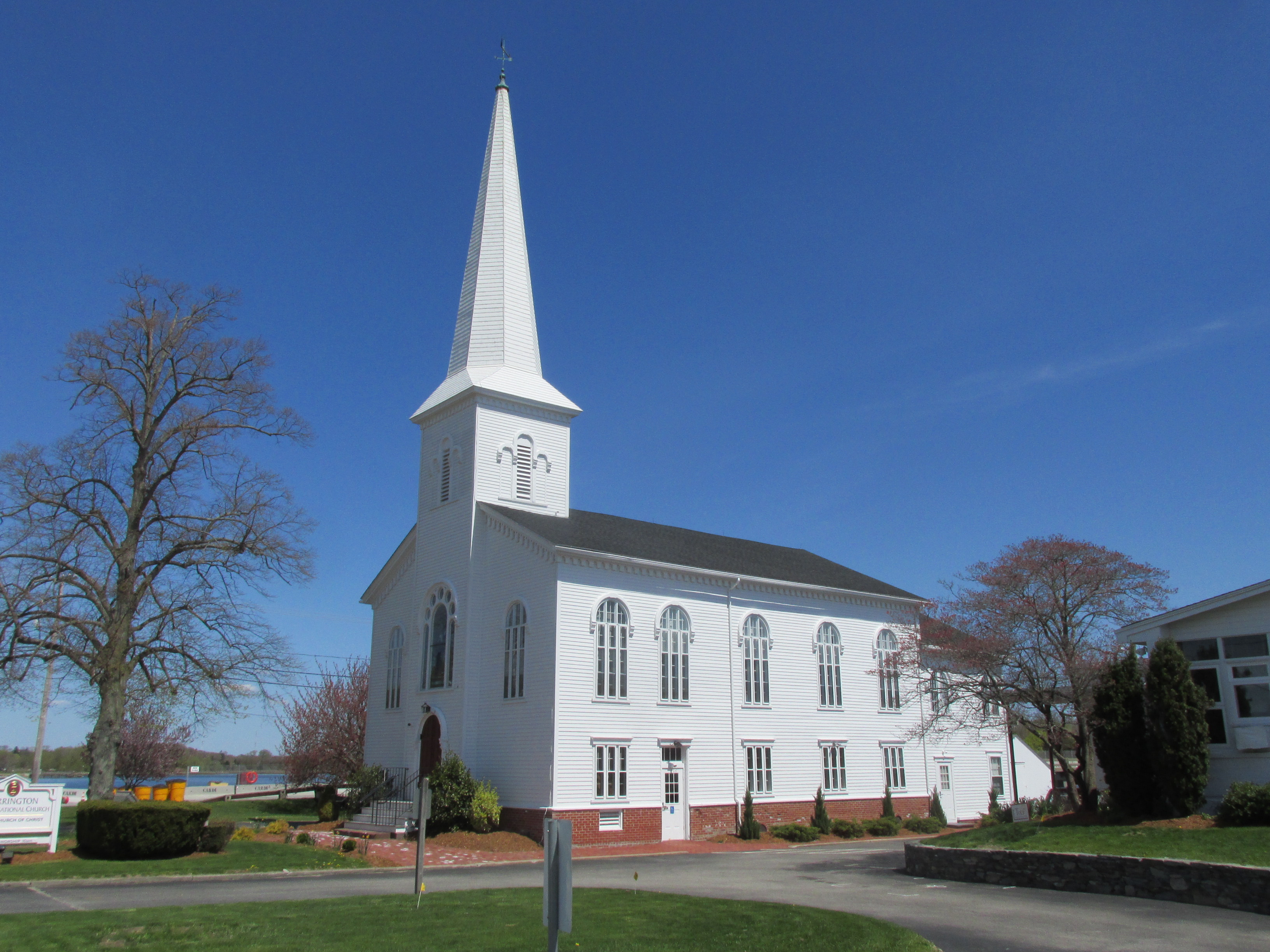
Shifts in influence between northern and southern portions of Barrington resulted in relocation of the Congregational Church (pictured).

Agriculture provided the basis for Barrington's economy in the early decades. Farmers typically cultivated grains, especially corn, rye, oats, and barley. Many farmers planted fruit trees and some developed large orchards, as apple cider was an important commodity for trade. Farming significantly affected the landscape, separating large grassland fields with fencing and stone walls.

Religion continued to influence Barrington politics. The new Congregational Society was formally declared the town's religion, following Massachusetts custom. Taxes supported the Congregational minister until 1797, and he was employed by the town meeting. Baptists and other religious groups were given the option to support their own meetings in 1728. In 1737, discussions about relocating the Congregational church proved divisive between the southern and northern portions of Barrington. The southern area was the historical center of town where the Congregational church and original Sowams settlers had been. But rapid population increases shifted influence northward, where abundant marshland and fertile soil allowed farmers to establish large, successful farms. Ultimately, the church relocated to the north, using a lot provided by Joshua Bicknell along County Road. The north continued to develop due to a combination of commercial establishments (mainly taverns and inns) and farmhouses near the relocated church.

=== Industrial production and suburbanization ===
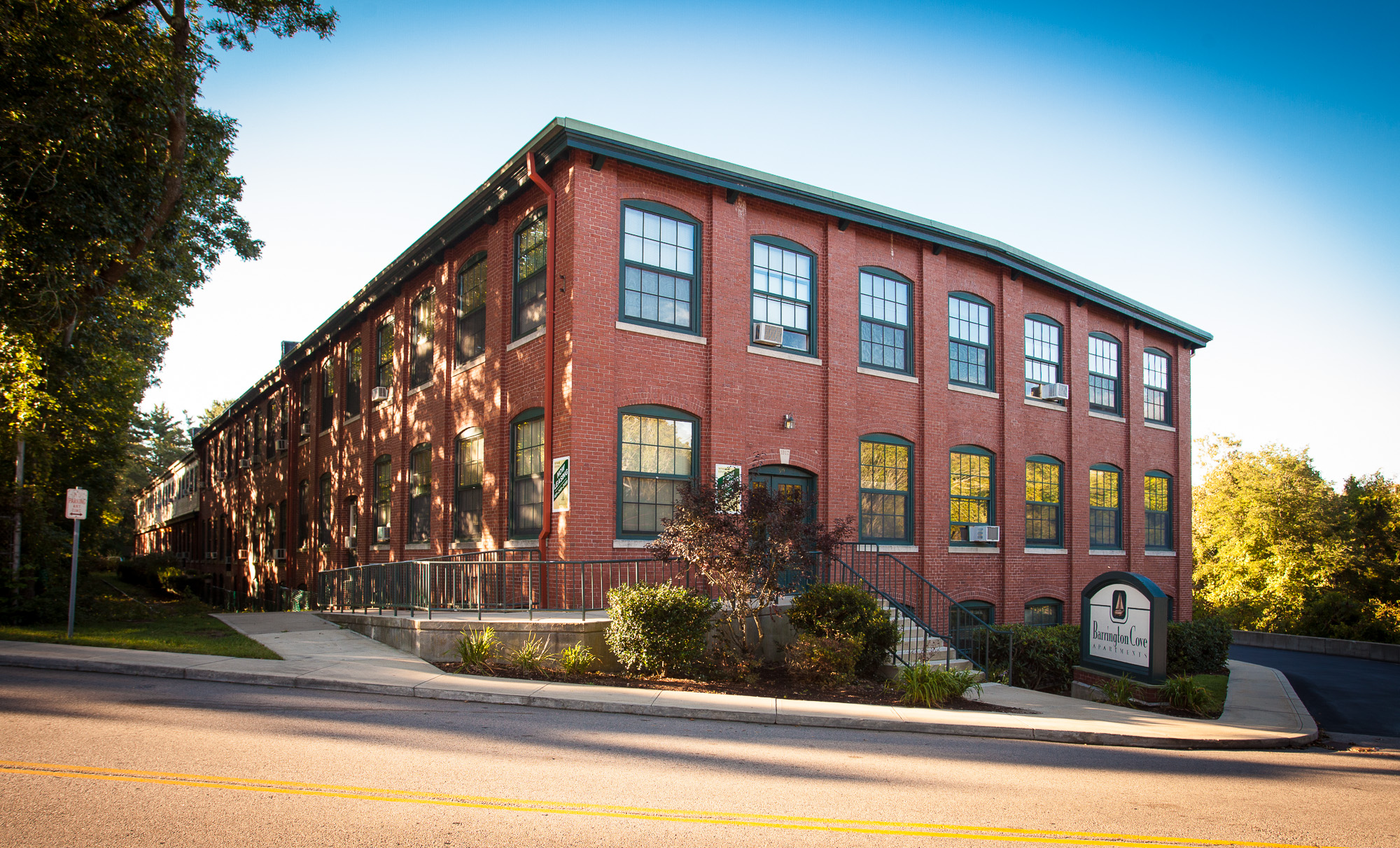
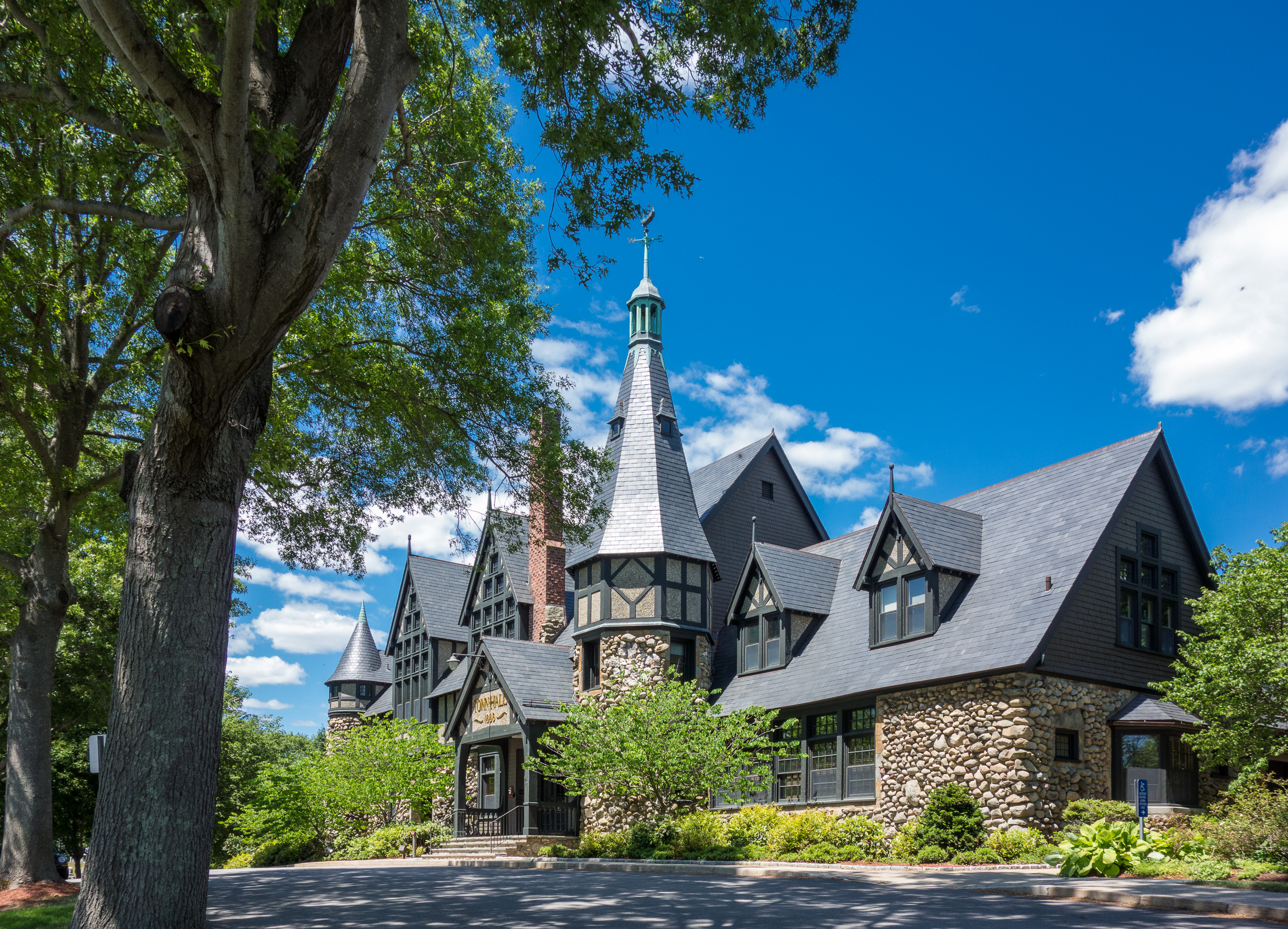
The railroad from Providence was constructed in 1855 and led to the development of commercial and public facilities

In 1847, Nathaniel Potter founded Nayatt Brick Company, which used Brickyard Pond's extensive clay deposits. The company was reincorporated as the Narragansett Brick Company in 1864, and the New England Steam Brick Corporation was founded in 1890 as a competitor. Brick production resulted in road-building, visits from seafaring vessels, and other such economic activity. These companies' original employees were mainly of French-Canadian descent, but Italians immigrated to the U.S. as a result of economic depression in the 1880s. A few hundred came to Barrington and worked at the brickyard, and their descendants make up a significant portion of the town population. Barrington's population grew from 850 in 1850 to 3,697 in 1920, mirroring overall trends in Rhode Island. Clay deposits began to deplete in 1900, and brickmaking operations ceased by 1930.

The construction of a railroad between Bristol and Providence in 1855 allowed residents to commute to Providence, resulting in an increasingly suburban milieu. The railroad led to the creation of several manufacturing industries in West Barrington, such as O'Bannon Mill and Rhode Island Laceworks (which provided commercial firefighting services for the town). New public facilities were also constructed during this period, such as a high school, town hall, and library. Developments catered to wealthy residents of urban areas who came to Barrington in the summer for its location near the shore, such as the Barrington Yacht Club and Rhode Island Country Club.

=== Modern era ===
Manufacturing establishments continued to operate in West Barrington throughout the 20th century. Throughout the 1930s, the Neweth Rubber Company produced retread tires, but its building burned down in the 1940s and was not rebuilt. Rhode Island Laceworks continued to operate until 1990, when its owners deemed profits insufficient. The 1938 New England hurricane caused considerable damage to homes along the shoreline and pleasure craft, and railroad service was discontinued shortly afterward.

Trends continued towards suburbanization, spurred by the availability of the automobile and the later post–World War II baby boom. Commercial establishments on County Road further reduced the need for outside travel and significantly altered the existing town landscape. Barrington Shopping Center was constructed in 1948 and included a supermarket, pharmacy, and bank; two smaller shopping centers were constructed afterward. Six schools comprise Barrington's modern education system, constructed throughout the 1950s. Town services grew with the establishment of a police force in 1934 and a fire department in 1953. Rapid population growth led the town to adopt a council-manager charter in 1960. New churches also opened, accommodating Roman Catholic, Baptist, Methodist, and Presbyterian citizens. In the 1980s, the East Bay Bike Path was constructed along the former railroad lines connecting Providence to Bristol. In the 1990s, the American Civil Liberties Union (ACLU) sued the town for its Christmas display, which featured a crèche. The town removed the display, and someone placed a privately owned scene on the road neighboring the town hall. Similarly, a lawsuit filed in 1996 by the ACLU regarding the town's decision to plow church parking lots for free was not contested. Barrington was the sole "dry" town in Rhode Island until 2011, when the town council approved two liquor stores.

== Geography ==
Barrington is on the eastern side of Narragansett Bay, in Bristol County, the third-smallest county in the United States. Situated 7 miles (11 km) southeast of Providence, it consists of two peninsulas divided by the Barrington and Warren rivers. The shoreline of the western peninsula, Phebe's Neck or Popanomscut, is marked by many coves and indentations, making a sharp bend at Nayatt Point. Rumstick Neck, around one and a half miles east of Nayatt, forms the southern end of Phebe's Neck. Northeast of Phebe's Neck lies the second peninsula, New Meadow Neck, which is bordered by Hundred Acre Cove and the Palmer River. According to the United States Census Bureau, Barrington has an area of 15.4 square miles (40 km^{2}), being composed of 8.2 square miles (21 km^{2}) land and 7.2 square miles (19 km^{2}) water.

Barrington lies on a low, mostly flat plain bordering the sea. This plain, composed mostly of layers of clay, gravel, sand, and silt soils, was formed by a melting glacier towards the end of the last ice age. Bedrock underlying the soil is largely composed of shales, sandstone, and conglomerate rock, with some outcrops of quartz. A few extremes in elevation, such as Nayatt Point, Primrose and Prince's Hill, rise to heights of 50 feet.

Freshwater bodies in Barrington include artificial ponds originally used for brickmaking and some minor streams. Clay deposited by the glacier near Brickyard Pond is exposed to tidewater at Mouscochuck Creek, which was used as a canal for brickmaking operations. Two other artificial ponds, Echo Lake and Volpe Pond, exist along this area; a third, Prince's Pond, drains into the Barrington River in the northeast.

== Demographics ==
Historical population

Year	Pop.
1774	601
1776	538
1782	534
1790	683
1800	650
1810	604
1820	634
1830	612
1840	549
1850	795
1860	1,000
1870	1,111
1880	1,359
1890	1,461

Year	Pop.
1900	1,135
1910	2,452
1920	3,897
1930	5,162
1940	6,231
1950	8,246
1960	13,826
1970	17,554
1980	16,174
1990	15,849
2000	16,819
2010	16,310
2020	17,153

Source: U.S. Decennial Census

Demographics (2010)
White	94.7%
Asian	2.8%
Two or more races	1.5%
Black	0.5%
Other race	0.4%
American Indian or Alaska Native	0.1%

As of the 2010 United States Census, Barrington had a population of 16,310. It is a predominantly white community at 94.7 percent of residents. There were 6,011 households; 40.3% had children under the age of 18 living with them, 68.7% were married couples living together, 7.6% had a female householder with no husband present, and 21.6% were non-families. Of all households, 18.8% were made up of individuals, and 10.0% had someone living alone who was 65 years of age or older. The average household size was 2.73 and the average family size was 3.14. The population was spread out, with 28.2% under the age of 18, 5.1% from 18 to 24, 26.4% from 25 to 44, 25.6% from 45 to 64, and 14.7% who were 65 years of age or older. The median age was 40 years. For every 100 females, there were 95.1 males. For every 100 females age 18 and over, there were 91.0 males.

According to 2017 United States Census estimates, the median income for a household in the town was $117,408, and the median income for a family was $139,591. Males had a median income of $93,125 versus $76,534 for females. The per capita income for the town was $59,515. About 1.7% of families and 2.8% of the population were below the poverty line, including 1.6% of those under age 18 and 5.7% of those age 65 or over. Barrington's $117,408 median household income ranks it as the wealthiest town in the state.

== Government ==
Barrington town vote by party in presidential elections
Year	GOP	DEM	Others
2024	27.01% 2,865	69.66% 7,389	3.33% 353
2020	26.67% 2,889	71.21% 7,713	2.12% 230
2016	29.70% 2,898	63.06% 6,153	7.25% 707
2012	40.14% 3,836	58.15% 5,557	1.71% 163
2008	37.11% 3,666	61.50% 6,075	1.39% 137
2004	42.40% 4,020	55.80% 5,291	1.80% 171
2000	42.60% 3,864	50.55% 4,585	6.86% 622
1996	42.05% 3,518	48.12% 4,026	9.83% 822
1992	40.22% 3,846	41.50% 3,968	18.28% 1,748
1988	55.77% 4,968	43.88% 3,909	0.35% 31

Barrington is a part of the 32nd District in the Rhode Island Senate, represented by Democrat Pamela Lauria. The town is in Rhode Island's 1st congressional district, represented by Democrat Gabe Amo. It is a Democratic stronghold in presidential elections, as the majority of residents have not voted for a Republican presidential nominee since 1988, when the town backed George H. W. Bush.

During the 2016 Republican presidential preference primaries, Barrington was the only town in Rhode Island to be won by former Governor John Kasich of Ohio. He received 700 votes (44.87%), ahead of Donald Trump, who got 687 votes (44.04%).

The town is run by a town council.

== Education ==
=== Public schools ===
Barrington Public Schools consists of four elementary schools (Sowams School, Primrose Hill School, Nayatt School, and Hampden Meadows School), Barrington Middle School, and Barrington High School. Sowams School, Primrose Hill School, and Nayatt School serves students in kindergarten to third grade, while Hampden Meadows School serves students from fourth to fifth grade.

=== Private schools ===
Private schools in Barrington include Barrington Christian Academy, St. Luke's, and St. Andrew's School.

Two Christian colleges occupied the Belton Court estate throughout the 20th and early 21st century. Barrington College was founded in 1900 and merged with Gordon College in 1985.

=== Barrington Public Library ===
Barrington established a library in 1806 when the pastor of the Barrington Congregational Church served as a librarian to the Barrington Library Society. After 20 years of the members paying a $1 fee, the town decided to help build up the library; starting in 1880 the library grew with books and materials. In 1984 the library moved next door. Since then, it has added a children's room, space for meetings, and renovations to keep up with technology and patrons' needs.

== Historical locations and points of interest ==
Nine residential and commercial developments from the town's early suburbanization are listed on the National Register of Historic Places, a record of important historical sites in American history.

The Allen-West House, among Barrington's oldest houses, stands on grounds farmed from the 17th to 20th century. A rare, well-preserved example of a vernacular house plan, it exemplifies architecture from Barrington's agricultural era. Alfred Drowne Road Historic District and Jennys Lane Historic District are historical subdivisions that developed during the late 1800s and early 1900s, having attracted residents from neighboring urban communities. Rhode Island Country Club was constructed by Donald Ross in 1911, and since 1999 has hosted the CVS Charity Classic annually.

The Barrington Civic Center Historic District in central Barrington includes Prince's Hill Cemetery, Barrington Town Hall, and the Leander R. Peck School, the last now housing the library and town senior center. Barrington Town Hall, described by the architects as "medieval", was originally used as the town's seat of government, library, and school; with the construction of Leander R. Peck School in 1917, the school moved and the library took its space. The T-shaped Elizabethan-Revival Peck School, which features a stairway to access its main entrance, was repurposed as the Barrington Public Library in the 1970s.

Nayatt Point Lighthouse, adjoined with its corresponding dwelling, served to guide vessels along the Providence River, marking the narrow passage between Nayatt and Conimicut Point. St. Matthew's Episcopal Church, founded by an Episcopal mission in the 1880s, mixes Queen Anne and Gothic Revival-style architecture. Belton Court, built for Frederick Peck, a businessman and Rhode Island politician, was the site of two colleges before being auctioned to a Massachusetts investor who intends to repurpose it as elderly housing. O'Bannon Mill, among the first mills to mass-produce imitation leather, went through three purchasers before being converted into elderly apartment housing in the 1990s.

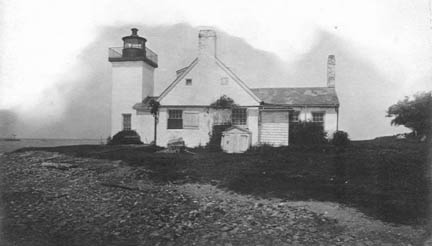
Nayatt Point Lighthouse, c. late 1800s

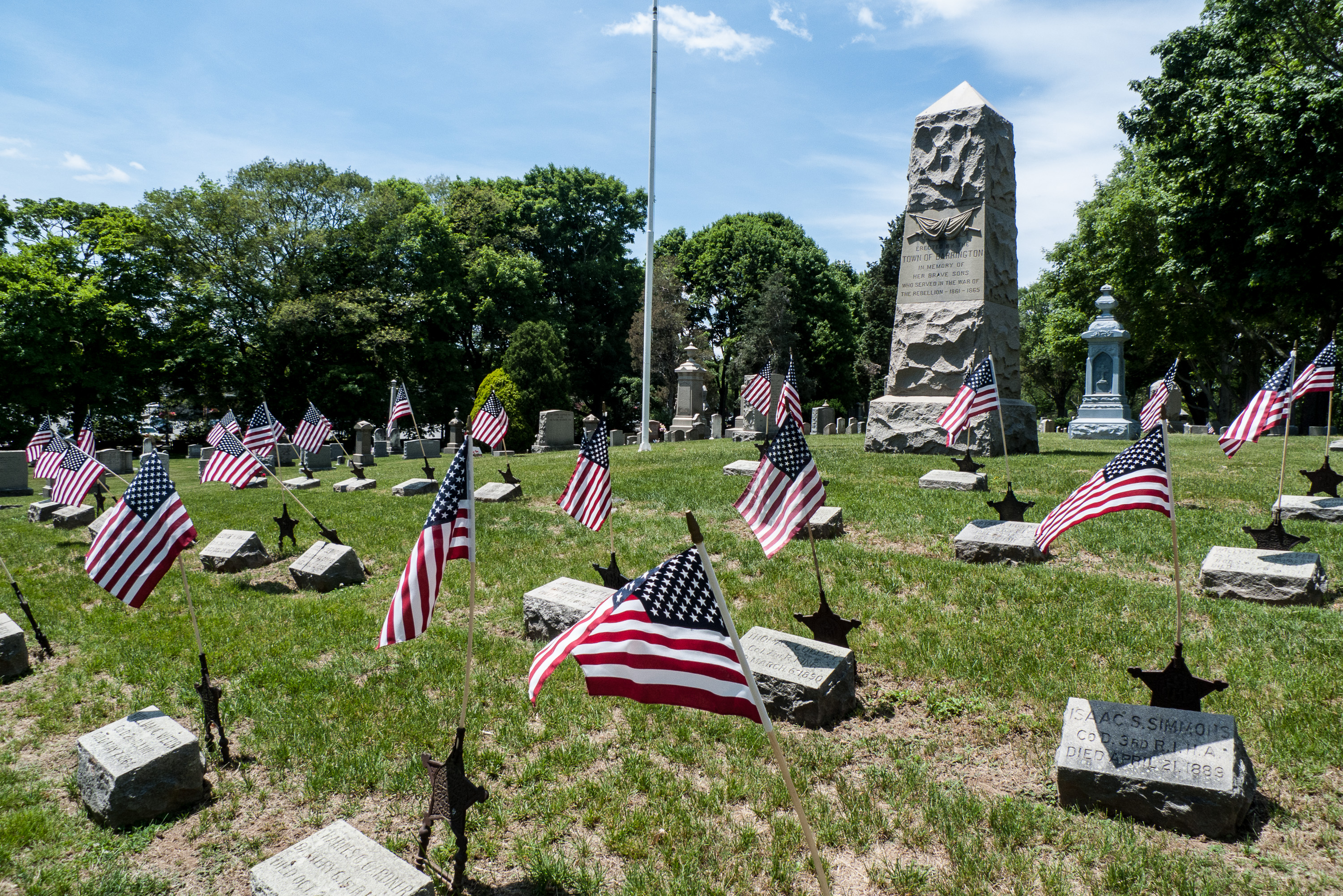
Prince's Hill Burial Ground

== Notable people ==
- Frederick S. Peck was a Rhode Island industrialist, philanthropist, politician, and art collector best known for building Belton Court—one of the largest homes ever constructed in the United States.
- David Angell, television sitcom producer (Frasier); multiple Emmy Award winner; lived in West Barrington; died during the September 11 attacks
- Nicholas Bianco, boss of the Patriarca crime family; lived in Barrington
- Thomas W. Bicknell, educator and historian; born in Barrington
- Ken Block, founder of the Moderate Party of Rhode Island, lives in Barrington
- Matt Borges, Ohio Republican Party Chairman from 2013 to 2017, born and raised in Barrington
- Bob Burnett, folk singer, banker and member of the folk band The Highwaymen, served as bank vice president in Barrington
- Christopher Denise, illustrator of children's books (The Great Redwall Feast, A Redwall Winter's Tale), lived in Barrington
- Nick DiGiovanni, American online personality and chef, lived in Barrington
- Thomas Francis Doran, Roman Catholic bishop, born in Barrington
- Brad Faxon, golfer with the PGA Tour; lived in Barrington
- Henry Giroux, academic and cultural critic; taught high-school social studies in Barrington
- Spalding Gray, actor, screenwriter and playwright (Swimming to Cambodia); raised in Barrington
- Michael S. Harper, Poet Laureate of Rhode Island (1988-1993); lived in Barrington
- Robert J. Healey, political activist, lived in Barrington
- Brian Howe, actor, lived in Barrington
- Carolyn Huntoon, NASA scientist, first woman director of the Johnson Space Center, resides in Barrington
- Linda Laubenstein, HIV/AIDS researcher, raised in Barrington
- Phil Madeira, Nashville musician and songwriter, raised in Barrington
- Shanna Moakler, model and actress; first runner-up at Miss USA 1995; alumna of Barrington High School
- Janet Moreau, 1952 Olympic champion runner in the 4 × 100 meters lived in Barrington
- Sean Spicer, former White House Press Secretary, was raised in Barrington
- Edward F. Welch, Jr., rear admiral of the United States Navy, born in Barrington
- C. D. Wright, poet, lived in Barrington
