= Wedding Cake House (Providence, Rhode Island) =

The Wedding Cake House
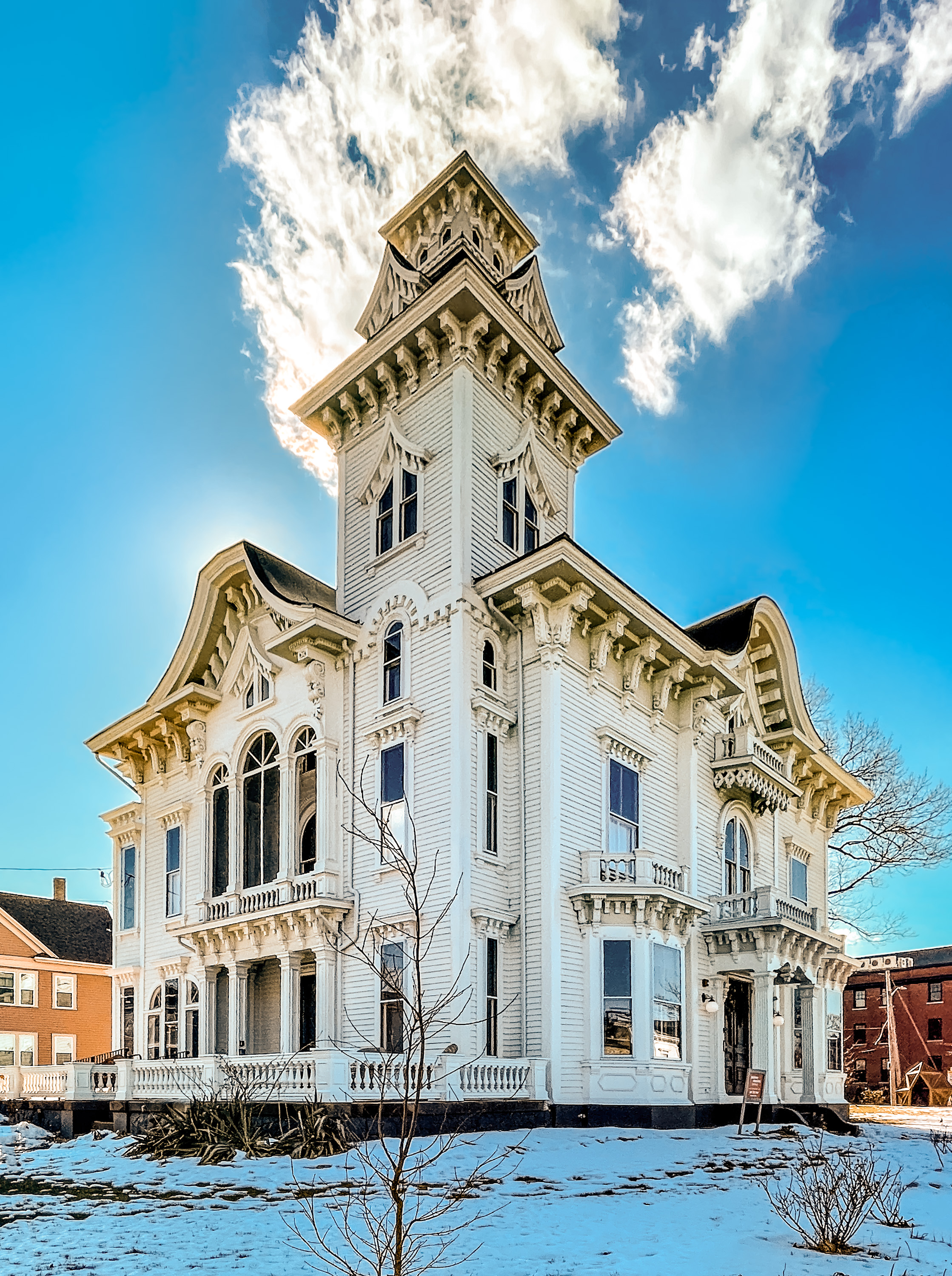
- Interactive map of the The Wedding Cake House area
- Alternative names: Kendrick-Prentice-Tirocchi House

General information
- Location: 514 Broadway Street, Providence, Rhode Island, US
- Coordinates: 41.818196°N 71.435385°W
- Construction started: 1867

Design and construction
- Architect: Perez Mason

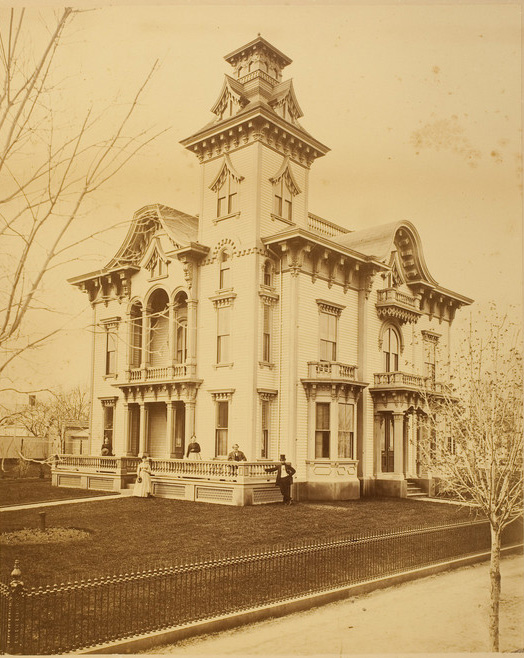
1867 photograph of the house's first owner, John Kendrick

The Wedding Cake House (formally known as the Kendrick-Prentice-Tirocchi house) is a three-story historic house located at 514 Broadway Street in the Broadway-Armory Historic District of Providence, Rhode Island, United States. Built in 1867 and occupied continuously until 1989, its contents were the subject of a 2001 exhibit at the Rhode Island School of Design Museum. It has had a variety of restoration work conducted since 2011.

Built in the Victorian Italianate style, it has been called Providence's ‘consummate gingerbread house’.

== Architecture ==
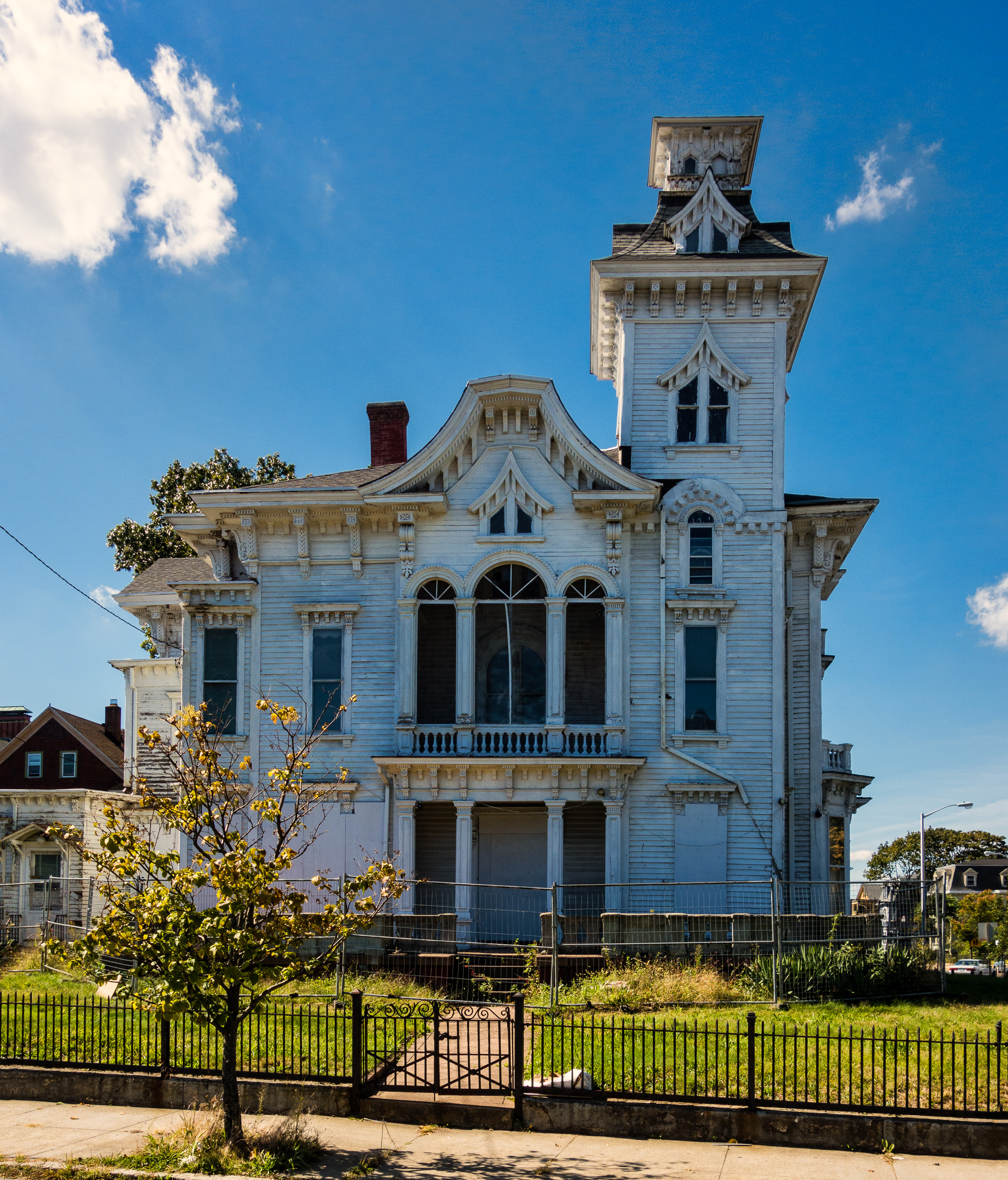
The house in 2012

Built by Broadway architect Perez Mason in 1867, it has been described by George P. Landow as a work of Carpenter Gothic, with “more carpenter than Gothic.” The rectilinear exterior of the house obscures its complex inner floor plan. Mason added a great deal of embellishment that distracts from the Second Empire elements of the roof, which is a low flaring mansard style with large brackets.

The ornate two-story tower has an unfinished room at the top that provides a wide view of the city; it is finished at its peak with a pagoda cupola. The main block of the house is interrupted by oversized “sunbonnet” or “sunburst” gables and a recessed two-story loggia. Landow goes on to describe the house as "a statement of idiosyncratic Rhode Island vernacular.” It also has an unfinished attic.

Several other houses along the street resemble the Wedding Cake house, including the Thomas Pierce House, also built 1867; the J. W. Windsor house at 106 Courtland (previously at 124 Broadway), built 1850; and the John W. Potter House at 446 Broadway, built 1882. However, 514 Broadway is the most striking example of the ‘flamboyant and pretentious’ Italianate homes that allowed Providence's nouveau-riche population to emulate the old-money mansions of Newport.

== Early years ==
The house was built in 1867 for John Kendrick, a businessman with the American Supply Co., which made loom harnesses for the textile industry.

Railway tycoon George W. Prentice bought it in 1881. He and his wife installed an elevator in the house sometime in the 1880s and thus were early adopters of this new technology. The elevator was decommissioned in 1924 after a line rotted.

Broadway addresses were changed twice, in 1867 and in 1893. The Wedding Cake House was located at 248 Broadway until 1893, when it changed to 514.

== Tirocchi family ==
The house was bought by sisters Anna and Laura Tirocchi in 1915, and occupied by their combined family until Laura died in 1982. Laura married Dr. Louis Cella, who had his medical office on the first floor.

The sisters used the second and third floors for their dressmaking business, which they had started in 1911 in the Butler Exchange Building. In 1917 Dr. Cella, had a small one-story addition built at the back of the house for his private practice.

=== RISD Museum ===
After Anna died in 1947, Laura closed the business, leaving material and records in situ. Their papers, tools, fabric, and the clothing in storage were left untouched for the next forty-two years. Seven years after Laura's death, her son Louis J. Cella Jr. approached the RISD Museum about acquiring the contents of the house. The collection - a "time capsule" - forms the most complete record of a historical dressmaking business in existence.

After twelve years of work cataloging and researching the collection, the museum put on an exhibition: From Paris to Providence: Fashion, Art, and the Tirocchi Dressmakers' Shop, 1915-1947. The RISD Museum owns the three hundred dresses from the collection and has archived the Tirocchi papers at Fleet Library. The University of Rhode Island maintains an additional two thousand objects, including fabric and trim samples.

The museum, in collaboration with Brown University, developed and continues to maintain an extensive website devoted to the project. It also has an eighth-grade American History curriculum component centered on the Tirocchis as women designers and Italian-American immigrants.

== Restoration ==
The Wedding Cake House was vacant from 1947 until 1982. Several restoration efforts have taken place since 2011 due to the efforts of the Providence Preservation Society, which listed the house on their Most Endangered Properties list in 2010, 2012, 2015, and 2016.

=== 2011-2015 ===
In 2011 it was announced that the now defunct non-profit Community Works Rhode Island had acquired the property, with the intention to complete a renovation by 2012. The plan included five condominium units that would be available to income-qualified buyers. CWRI managed to raise almost $200,000 in state historic tax credits for the restoration, which is transferable to new owners. However, the plan failed, and in 2016 owners were left with a $350,000 loan to repay to the Providence Redevelopment Agency. It had granted the money based on a use for affordable housing.

In addition, the Providence Revolving Fund has raised a considerable amount of money to support the building. It has worked to repair basic structural issues, such as rotten sills, a leaky roof, and the lean of its two-story tower.

=== 2015 to present ===
The West Broadway Neighborhood Association and the Providence Preservation Society came together to run a semi-successful Indiegogo campaign in 2015 to support emergency renovations while the house remained on the market. The Providence Revolving Fund has also worked to prevent further damage via the installation of an alarm system. But the building is threatened by the years of low maintenance.

It is under renovation by Rhode Island feminist arts collective, the Dirt Palace, in an effort to adapt the property as an artist residency space, similar to their current location in Olneyville, Rhode Island. By the date of sale in February 2017, Dirt Palace already had a $250,000 grant from the Rhode Island State Council of the Arts to finance the restoration. The collective intends to alter the original plan of the house as little as possible.

== See also ==
- A. & L. Tirocchi Gowns
