= A. & L. Tirocchi Gowns =

American dressmaking company

A.& L. Tirocchi Gowns (also known as Di Renaissance) was a business founded in 1911 in Providence, Rhode Island, by sisters Anna and Laura Tirocchi. They were dressmakers whose custom work was well known during the 1920s and '30s. They specialized in custom-designed gowns for the city's elite women, produced in their multi-story house on Broadway, which housed the custom business and their family. They operated their business until 1947, despite competition from retail manufactured clothing.

The sisters and their business are notable because the quarters were preserved by the family in situ after it closed in 1947. The contents were donated in 1989 to Rhode Island School of Design which, with Brown University and the University of Rhode Island, worked for years to inventory and catalog the records and materials. In 2001 the business was the subject of an exhibition at the RISD Museum; it is believed to be the most complete collection of a 20th-century custom dressmaking business in existence. Community efforts have been made since 2011 to restore and find new uses for what is now known as Wedding Cake House, which their family occupied from 1915 to 1989.

== Early lives ==
Anna (b.c. 1873) and Laura Tirocchi (b.c. 1888) were half-sisters born into a landowning family in the working-class town of Guarcino, Italy. They had different fathers. They received high-quality training in dressmaking and design in Rome, where they moved with their mother. (Family tradition said that they studied with a royal couturier.)

== Immigration to the United States ==
In 1908, the sisters left Rome and immigrated to New York, when Anna was in her mid-thirties and Laura around twenty years old. They settled in Providence, Rhode Island by 1911. Several family members were already living in the city, and there was a considerable Italian immigrant population.

== Tirocchi business in Providence ==
After six months of working under an established dressmaker, Rose Zarr, the Tirocchis set up their own business. They found space in the Butler Exchange Building and set up shop. They worked from room 438, and lived with a cousin on Pocasset Avenue.

From their earliest years in the business, the sisters attracted enough demand to hire additional stitchers. The Butler Exchange was a center of custom retail activity at the time for upper-class women, who also patronized the milliners and shoemakers. They also studied with or brought their children to numerous music teachers who worked in the building. Despite competition, the quality of the Tirocchi sisters’ work swiftly attracted clients and recognition.

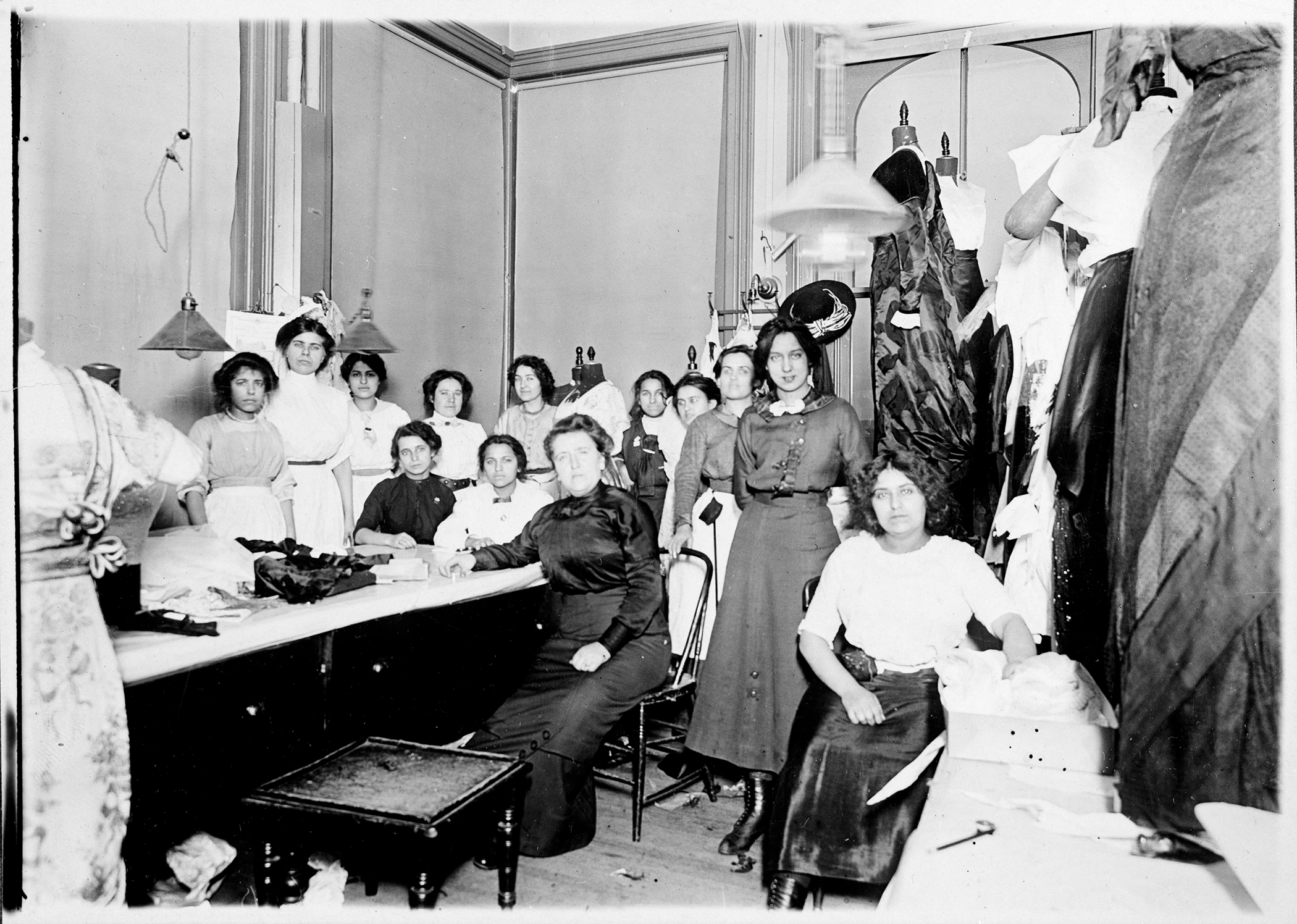
Anna Tirocchi (seated, in dark clothing) and her employees at the Butler Exchange shop, ca. 1912.

This elite client base was what Anna preferred, and she was the leader of the business. After Laura received an inheritance from her father, who had been quite well off, they were able to move to a part of town that suited Anna's fashionable taste. Broadway, in what is now known as the historic armory district on the West Side, was a more elegant part of the city. They purchased an elegant, three-story house, constructed in 1867, and most of its furnishings from the widowed Mrs. George Prentice.

Laura became engaged to a young physician, Dr. Louis J. Cella, and they married. The Tirocchis allowed Mrs. Prentice to live in the property until May 1915, when the Cella family and Anna Tirocchi moved in.

== 514 Broadway ==
514 Broadway was suited to their business. The three-story house was a mix of Second Empire and Italianate styles. The Broadway house resembled the mansions of the Tirocchis’ clientele, and they felt comfortable in its lavish surroundings. For the first ten years of business, the Tirocchis operated their custom design business on the second floor, and clients were invited to use an elevator to reach it.

Dr. Cella's medical practice was located on the first floor, along with the office of the family bookkeeper. In 1917 they built an addition to the side of the house, where he moved his office. He may have specialized in urology and venereal disease. He was elected as the district alderman and he was active in advocating for clean water in the city, at a time when infrastructure was under construction. By the 1930s, Dr. Cella had become a medical missionary in China and spent long periods of time away from Providence.

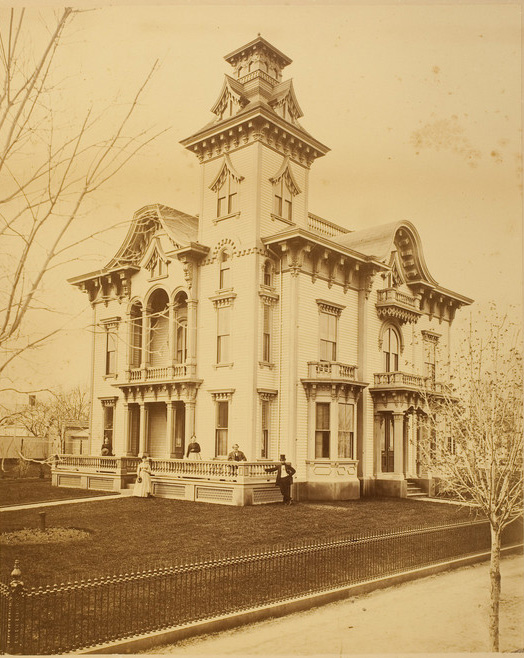
Wedding Cake House - 514 Broadway, Providence, RI

The house had been beautifully furnished. The second floor was used for the public parts of the dressmaking business. The Red Room and Blue Room – so named because of the color of their wallpapers – were used as glamorous fitting rooms. They were fitted with wall-to-wall mirrors and lace covered the armchairs. The neighboring billiards room was used as a showroom for fabrics. The sisters would drape some over the billiards table and folded other luxury fabrics for display in windowed cabinets. The atmosphere was opulent even into the cash-strapped forties.

The house's third floor contained the sewing shop and the family's living quarters. Up to fourteen young women, called 'girls', would have been working in the shop (this number dwindled over the years). Five members of the Tirocchi-Cella family lived in the house at any given time. Whole rooms were devoted to the storage of fabrics and custom dress forms for clients. Parts of the public second floor were also put to use as storage for the many materials used by the business.

== Class and culture ==
Anna projected an image of affluence to her clients while working to establish financial security and social standing for her family. Even as an independent seamstress running a dressmaking shop, she belonged to Providence's middle class.

The Tirocchis had owned land in Italy, and Anna meant to achieve that status in Providence. During a period of good business, she bought a summer cottage at Narragansett Pier. She rented it out in the thirties and forties when custom business slowed. Even before this large purchase, though, she frequently invested in other properties in Providence. Her property on Broadway included lots on neighboring streets, which she rented to businesses for decades. In addition, she owned a gas station in Cranston and a restaurant on North Main. Anna managed most of the family's money with help from their bookkeeper. Dr. Cella submitted payments to them instead of keeping his practice financially separate.

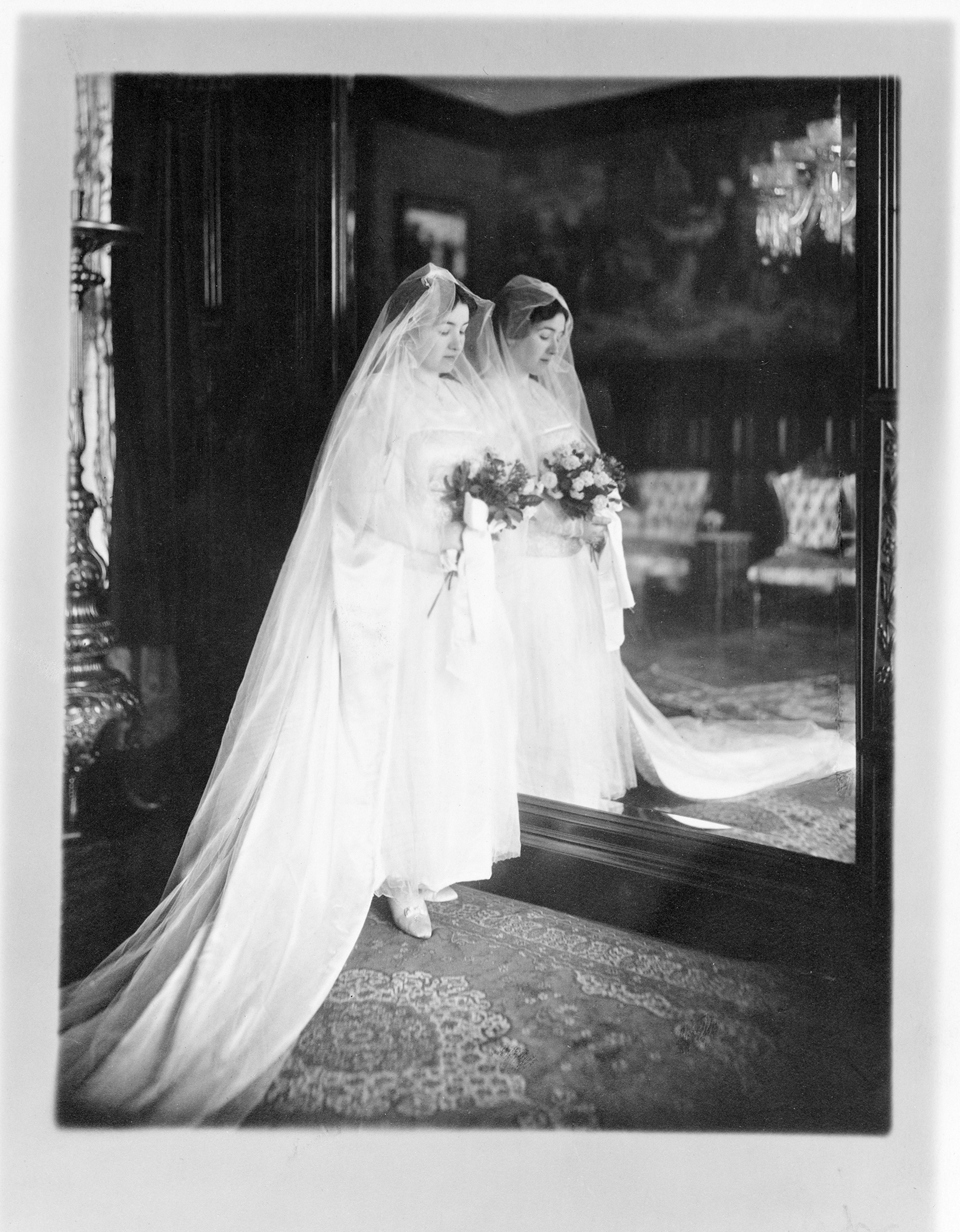
Laura Tirocchi at the time of her marriage to Dr. Louis J. Cella, 1915.

Anna made yearly trips to Europe from 1924 until the thirties, primarily to Paris for business. While there, she attended shows by designers such as Lucien Lelong. She gained ideas and also returned with stories with which to regale her clients. With her Italian training, fancy home, and annual Parisian adventures, she was more worldly than most dressmakers.

Because of this, Anna probably felt that she had some measure of an upper-class life, with her house and separate properties, but her clients certainly did not see her as a peer. Letters from clients reveal their double standards; they refer to her as ‘Our Anna’, rather than ‘Madame Tirocchi’, as she preferred.

Anna Tirocchi held her business to the high standard she felt her work deserved, as her nephew Louis Cella Jr. and workers later attested. Most middle-class women would not have had the money to use a personal dressmaker in the first place, and Anna refused to serve the nouveau riche of Providence, believing that only those born to the upper class could truly appreciate her designs and work.

She did make exceptions for notable members of her own community. She became a dressmaker for Mrs. Mariano Vervena, the wife of the Italian Consul in Providence, and for the daughter of her friend, Judge Antonio Capotasto.

== Anna Tirocchi and her workers ==
Tirocchi consistently hired workers from the Italian immigrant community. The majority of her workers, referred to as ‘girls’ in the custom of the time, were daughters of Italian immigrants who lived in communities such as Silver Lake. Many had come from Anna's home town of Guarcino, and were introduced through community connections.

In this way, the Tirocchi family took an active, if quiet, role in supporting immigrant working-class people like themselves. Anna strove to create a close-knit network of care around her workers. While they worked long days, nobody was required to take their work home, which was a common practice in sweatshops and mills. The shop effectively functioned under the apprentice system. Promotions and raises came regularly with acquisition of skills and experience. Several of her longer-term workers started dressmaking businesses of their own.

Anna took in her niece for a period of years while she attended a school close by. She also worked with the other 'girls'. The shop workers formed a community, and called each other family. They sewed each other's wedding dresses, with the fabric donated to the bride by Anna, and some kept in contact for the rest of their lives. Each summer, Anna took the girls to her house in Narragansett for a week's vacation.

== Dressmakers in Providence ==
Most dressmakers in Providence worked from home. The 1911 business directory has more than 800 listings for women dressmakers. Many were likely women who did repairs and alterations, not entrepreneurs who ran businesses. About a dozen women worked out of homes on Broadway, close to where Anna opened her own business.

Some women established shops in downtown buildings such as Butler Exchange. Such locations included the Lederer Building at 139 Mathewson, the Arcade at 65 Weybosset, and the Conrad Building at 371-391 Westminster. The Tirocchis tried to promote their business: from the beginning they identified as “A. & L. Tirocchi Gowns” rather than 'Dressmakers’, as other businesses did. Their move to Broadway was a step to provide their elite customers with more privacy and personal attention than possible in the downtown offices.

Anna depended on word-of-mouth to build her client list. She knew her audience and occasionally had items about her business in their bulletins, such as that of the Junior League of Rhode Island. There was a general silence in the public sphere about women businesses. For instance, directories showed many advertisements for male tailors but lacked ads for women dressmakers.

== Ready-To-Wear competition and a decline in business ==
Textile and clothing manufacturing had lowered the price for purchases. Ready-to-wear clothes had been sold at department stores for decades. By the time the Tirocchis established their business, many women had begun to buy clothing from retail stores, rather than make it themselves or pay someone else. The market declined for custom, bespoke clothing . Tailoring services began to disappear; by 1915 the number of women dressmakers listed in the directory had decreased by forty percent to 480. By 1941, the city directory listed 134 women dressmakers. Half disappeared by 1946, the last full year that Anna worked.

The Tirocchis worked hard to stay in business. Although they lost customers in the Depression, their elite clientele preferred their quiet, comfortable, highly personalized home environment to the popular new ‘ready-to-wear’ stores. Anna's Roman training gave her status above the American-trained dressmakers in the city. She rebranded the shop as 'Di Renaissance' sometime before 1926, giving the business a classier air. Her investments in property yielded rental income when the dressmaking business declined.

Anna kept her shop operating until her death in 1947, a testament to her skill as a dressmaker, her involvement with the community, and her business acumen. Laura had taken less of a role because of family obligations. She immediately closed it after Anna died, devoting herself to her family and personal life. Her family kept the house, as they continued to live in it.

== The Collections ==
In 1989, Laura's son Louis Cella, Jr. offered the contents of the house to the Rhode Island School of Design Museum, the RISD Archive, and the University of Rhode Island. These collections contain thousands of business records and letters, a number of complete dresses, hundreds of yards in bolts of fabric and robes, and a variety of sewing paraphernalia. In 2001, the Museum exhibited the collections and research in From Paris to Providence: Fashion, Art, and the Tirocchi Dressmakers' Shop.

== See also ==
- Wedding Cake House (Providence, Rhode Island)
