= Henderson's Directories =

Canadian household directories

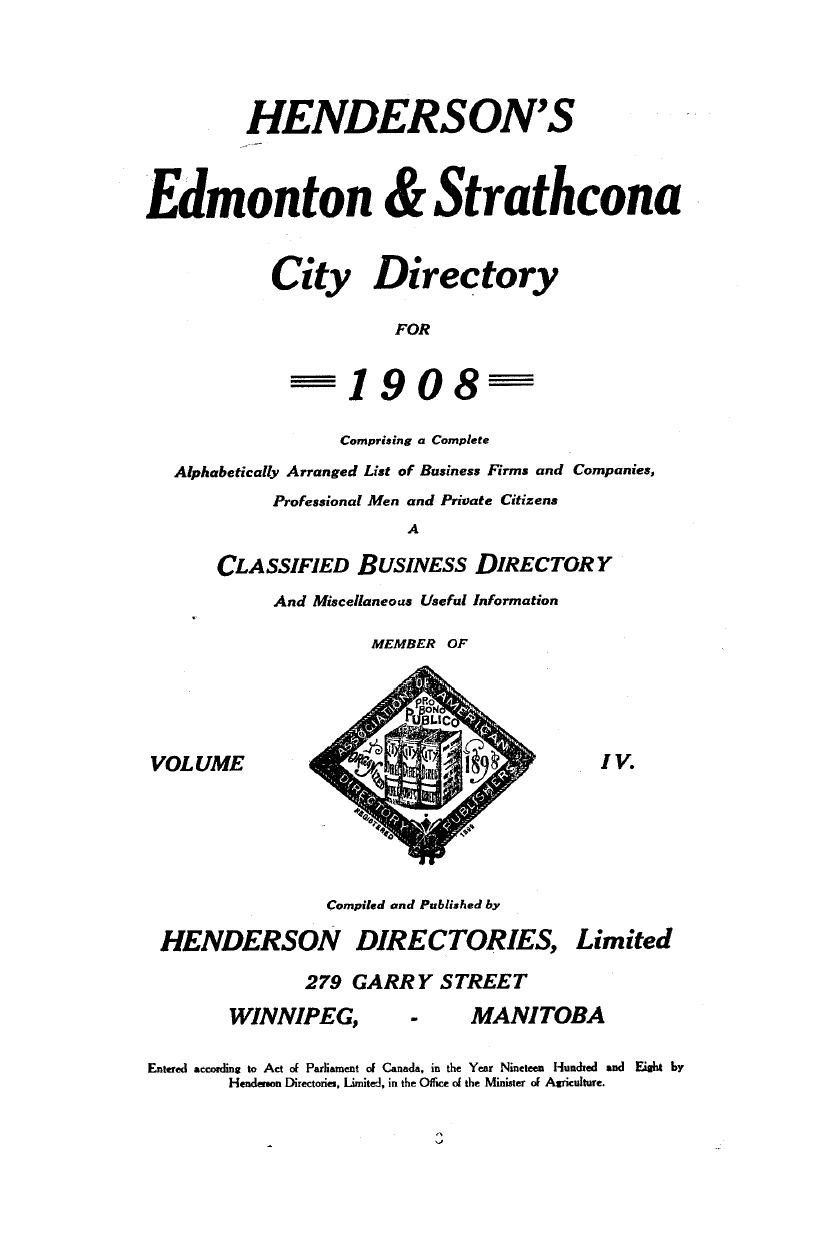
The cover of the 1908 Edmonton and Strathcona edition

The Henderson's Directories are historical city directories of households and businesses in Canada, published starting around 1880. The geographical focus was on Manitoba, Alberta, and Saskatchewan; but coverage also included some cities in British Columbia and Ontario. Coverage varied depending on location and year. Titles also varied greatly: examples include Henderson's Manitoba and Northwest Territories gazetteer and directory, Henderson's Directories of Western Canada, Henderson's Edmonton city directory, and many others. The publication was intended to be annual, but publication frequency often varied.

== Background ==
The directories were published by Winnipeg-based Henderson Directories Limited, founded by James Henderson (ca. 1846-1919), whose obituary refers to him as "one of the best known publishers on the continent." At the time, many other directories publishers were operating in Canada, covering different geographical areas.

Agents of Henderson Directories Limited would go door-to-door, gathering information from residents and businesses. Inclusion was not mandatory, and individuals or business could request to be excluded. These agents would record the names of residents, their professions, as well as business and residential addresses.

== Contents ==
The directories generally included:

- Business advertisements, some with images.
- City information: e.g. key statistics; governance structure; city departments and facilities as well as local clubs, associations & churches with the names of officials and board members, local Chambers of Commerce information.
- Province information: similar to city information - statistics, governance, key contacts, etc
- Alphabetical homeowner and business directory: Name, address, occupation, telephone when applicable
- Classified business directory organized by type of business
- Street and Avenue Guide (in later editions): Street address, Occupant or home owner, telephone if applicable .

== Modern use ==
Henderson's Directories can be used for many different types of historical research. They present a rich primary source for demographic information, illustrating patterns of settlement across urban areas in Western Canada. Advertisements can be used as visual illustrations of consumer and social trends. They can be used to trace the history of the cities' urban planning around infrastructure and public works.

Because they include the names and professions of individuals, they are also useful for genealogists and local historians. Several public libraries and family history networks have included Henderson's Directories on their list of recommended sources. Casual users may find the directory useful for finding out the history of their homes.
