= Broadway–Armory Historic District =

Historic district in Rhode Island, United States

- U.S. National Register of Historic Places
- U.S. Historic district
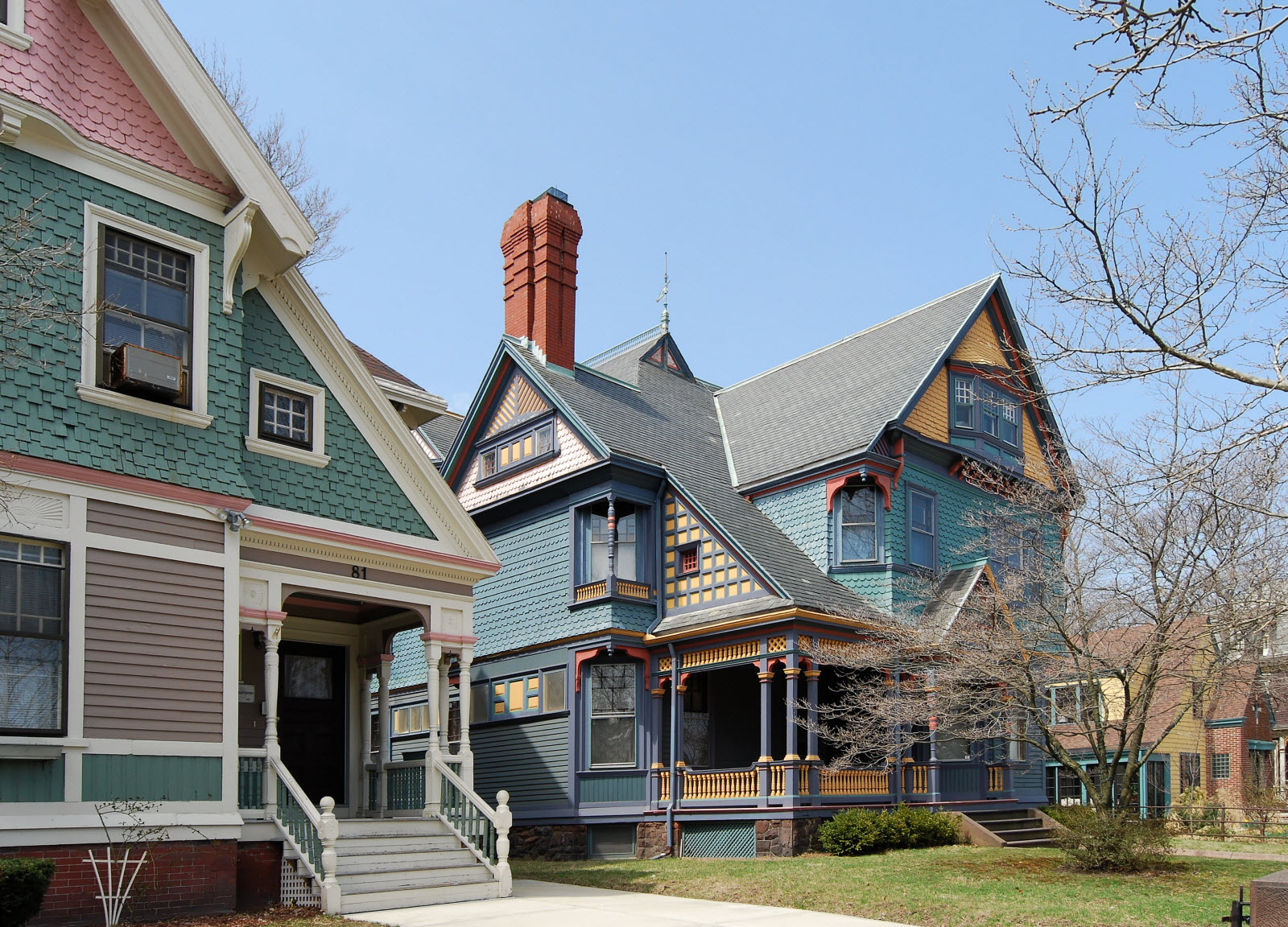
- Historic homes on Parade Street

- Location within Rhode Island Location within the United States
- Location: Providence, Rhode Island
- Coordinates: 41°48′58″N 71°25′46″W
- Area: 194 acres (79 ha)
- Architectural style: Greek Revival, Italianate, Queen Anne
- NRHP reference No.: 74000047 (original); 07001342 (increase)

Significant dates
- Added to NRHP: May 1, 1974
- Boundary increase: January 2, 2008

The Broadway–Armory Historic District is a historic district encompassing a mainly residential mixed-used urban area west of downtown Providence, Rhode Island.

== Description ==
The district is one which saw its most significant growth between the 1830s and 1910s. It is in roughly in the shape of an inverted boot, whose east–west axis is Broadway between Dean and Messer Streets, and whose north–south spine is centered on Dexter Field, extending from Cranston Street in the south to Grove Street in the north, with its western bound at Messer Street and its eastern bound at Bridgham Street. Most of the area consists of residential wood-frame construction on smaller lots, with commercial development most evident on Broadway and Westminster Street. The Cranston Street Armory anchors the southern end of Dexter Field, a public park that was formerly a militia training ground. There are more than 1,000 historically significant buildings in the district.

The district was added to the National Register of Historic Places in 1974, and was slightly enlarged in 2008 to include a small number of properties on the eastern boundary of the district on Broadway and Dean Street.

=== Dexter Training Ground ===
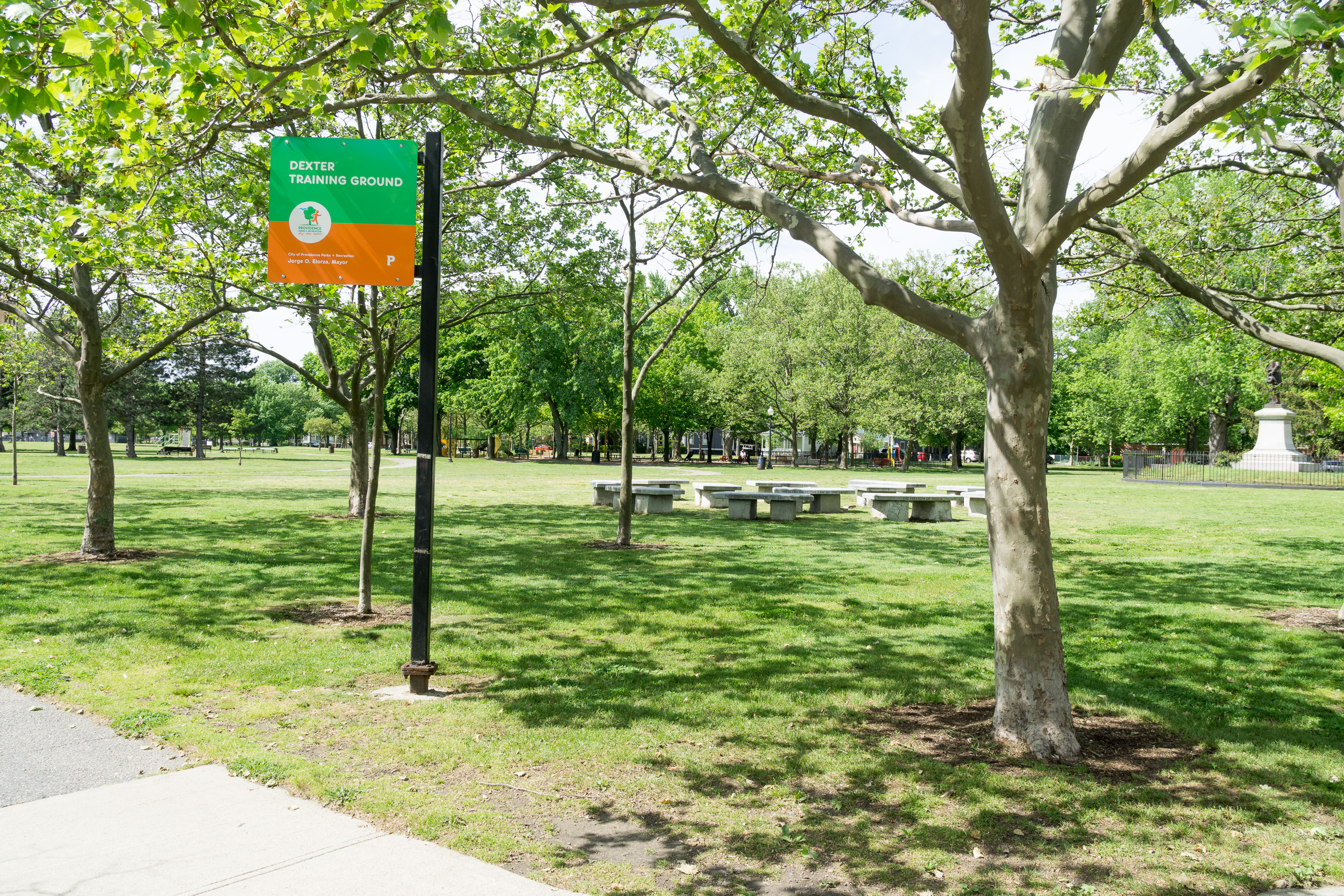
Dexter Training Ground

The Armory stands at the southern end of the Dexter Training Ground, a plot of land which was donated to the City of Providence by Ebenezer Knight Dexter for holding military exercises. The Training Ground was used as an encampment and drill field during the Civil War. The 14th Rhode Island Heavy Artillery Regiment, the first Black company from Rhode Island to serve in the Civil War, trained and camped here.

In July 1917, doughboys camped at Dexter Training Ground as they prepared to depart for Europe and World War I.

Today the land is a heavily used neighborhood park. The park features a playground, and attracts dog walkers and strollers. A bronze statue of benefactor and namesake Ebenezer Knight Dexter stands at the northern end of the park.

In July 2020, mayor Jorge Elorza held an outdoor ceremony in Dexter Training Ground where he signed an executive order to come up with a “truth-telling and reparations process” in Providence.

== Gallery ==
Contributing properties

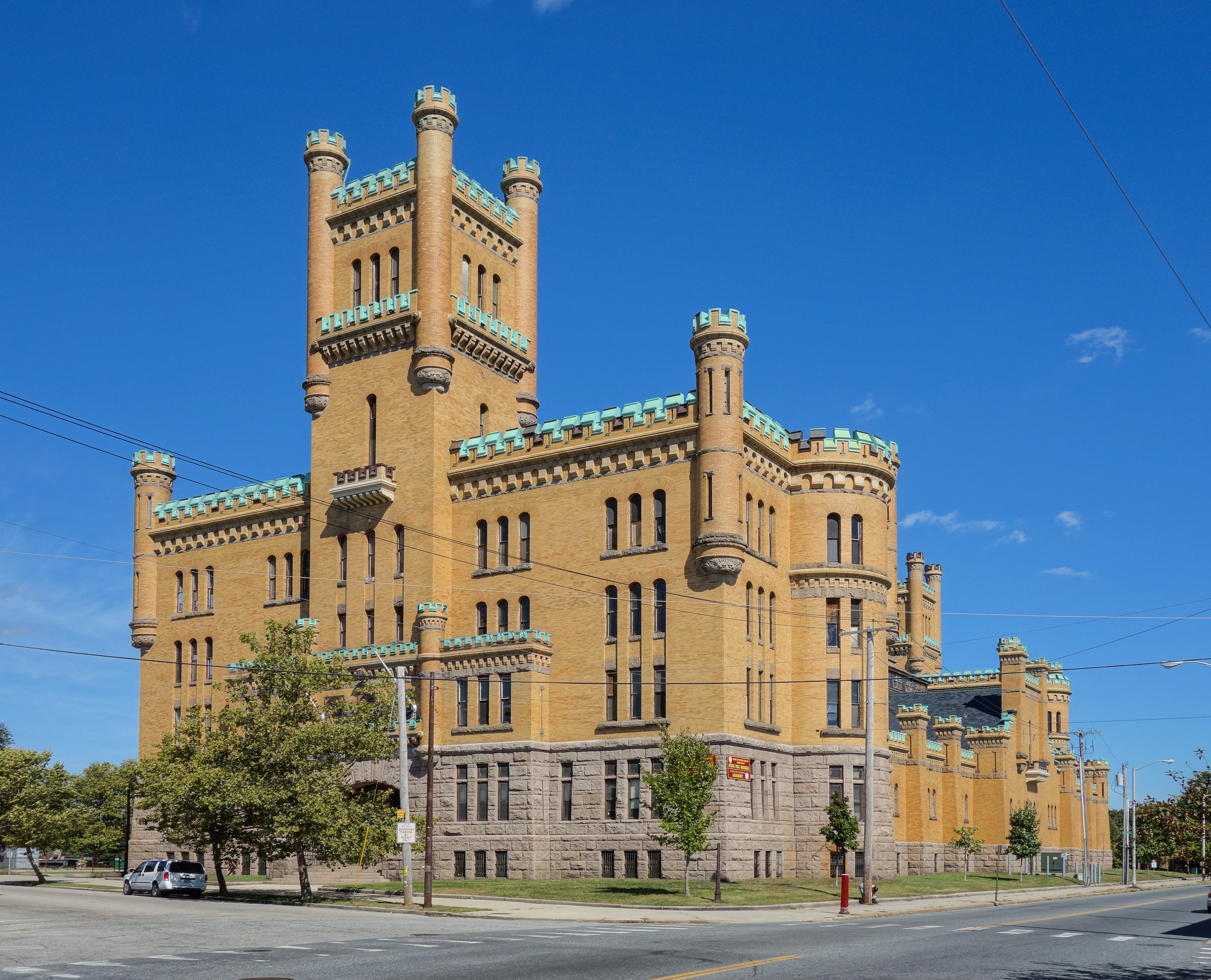
Cranston Street Armory, 1907

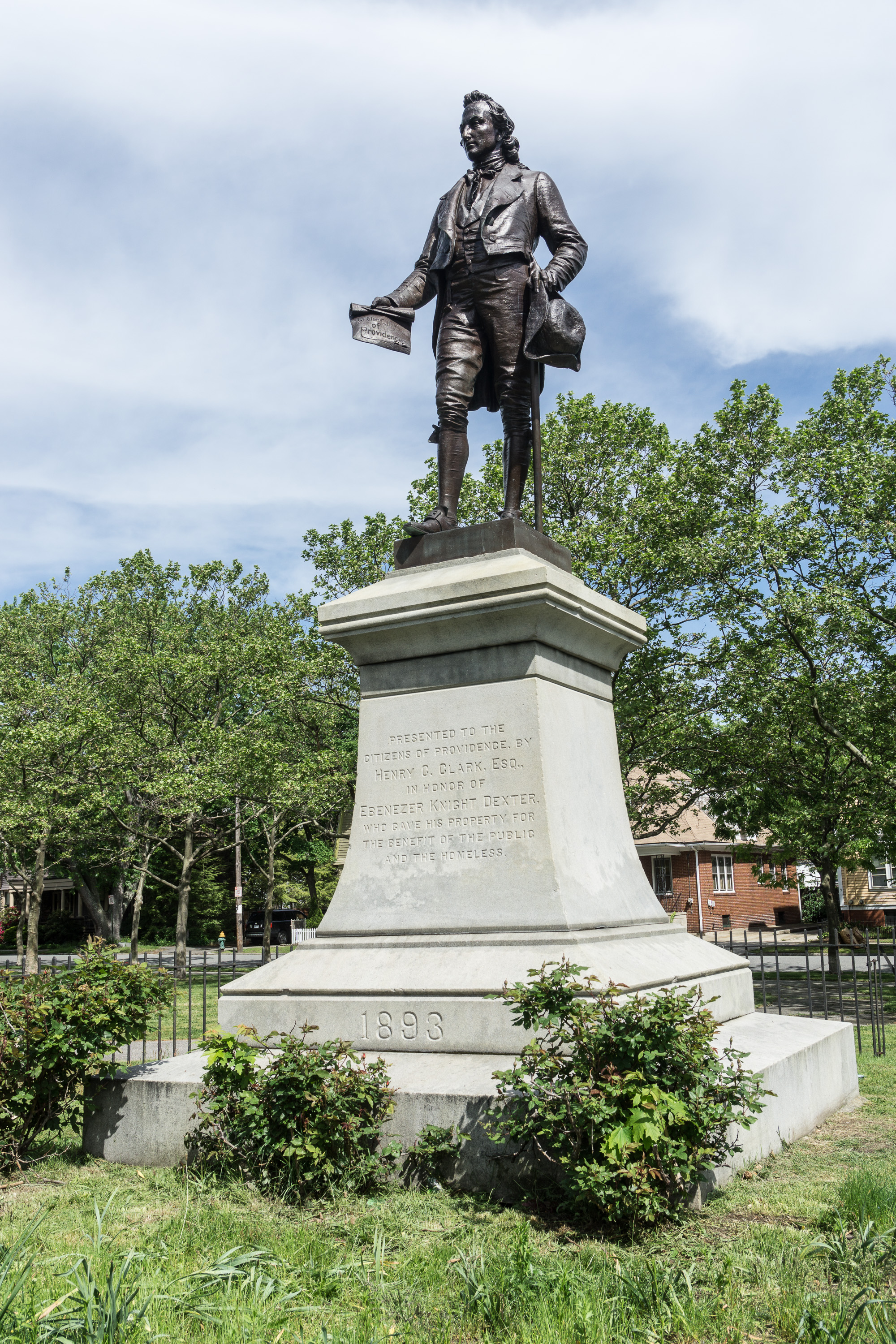
Statue of Ebenezer Knight Dexter in Dexter Training Ground

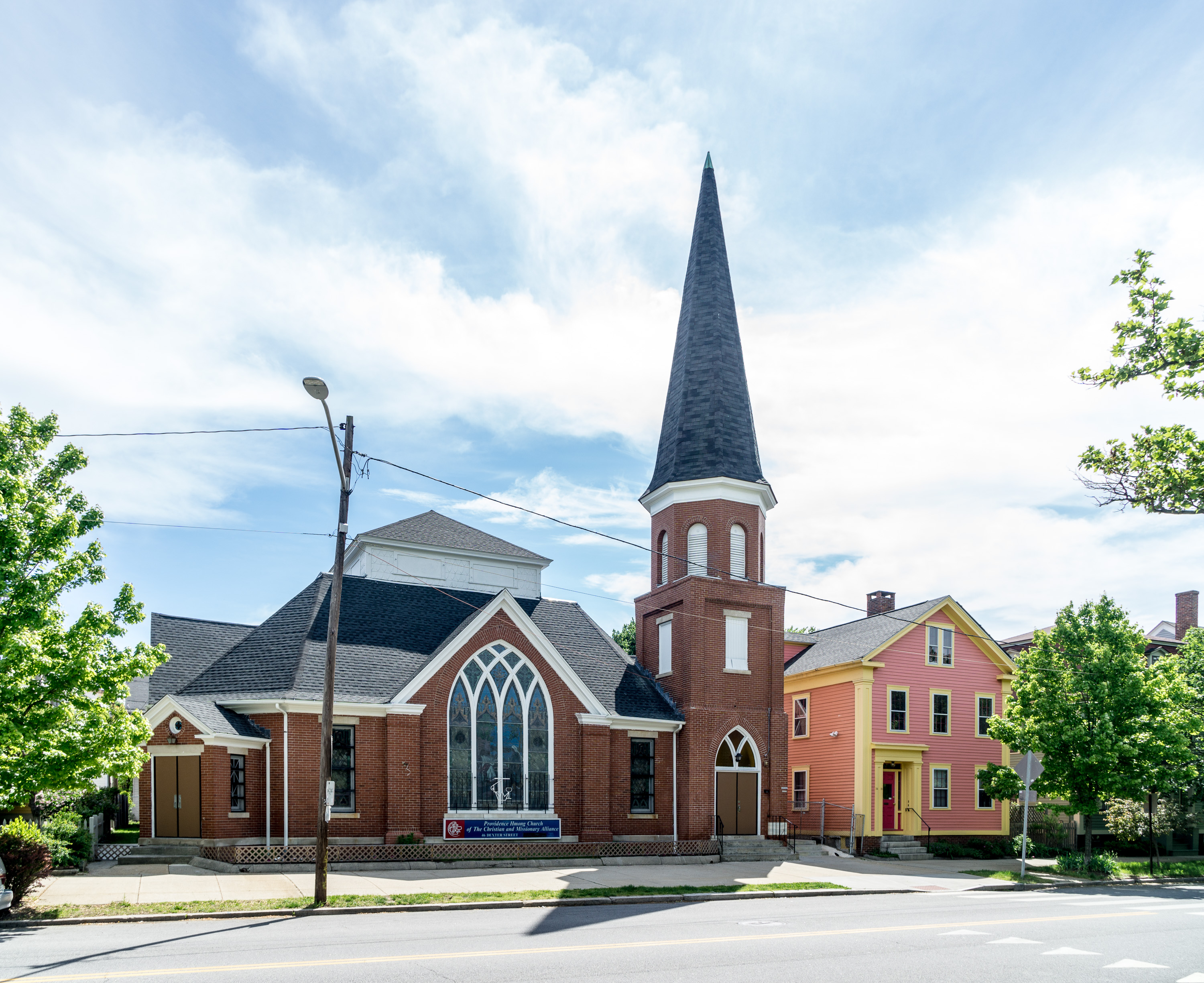
46 Dexter street, Providence Hmong Church, formerly Advent Christian Church (1909); 54/56 Dexter Street next to it.

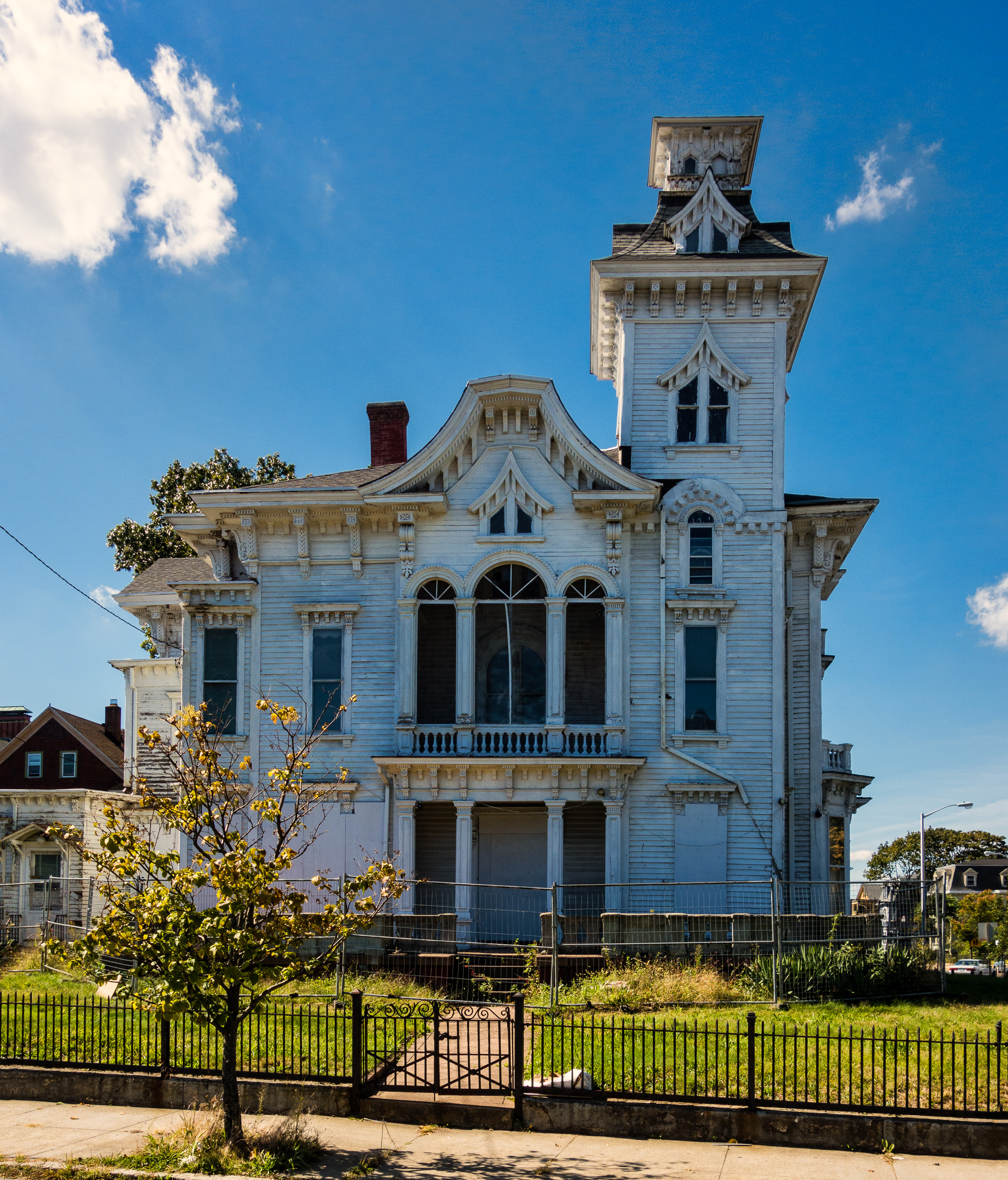
"Wedding Cake House", AKA Kendrick-Tirocchi-Prentice House at 514 Broadway. 1867, attributed to Broadway architect Perez Mason. Former location of A. & L. Tirocchi Gowns.

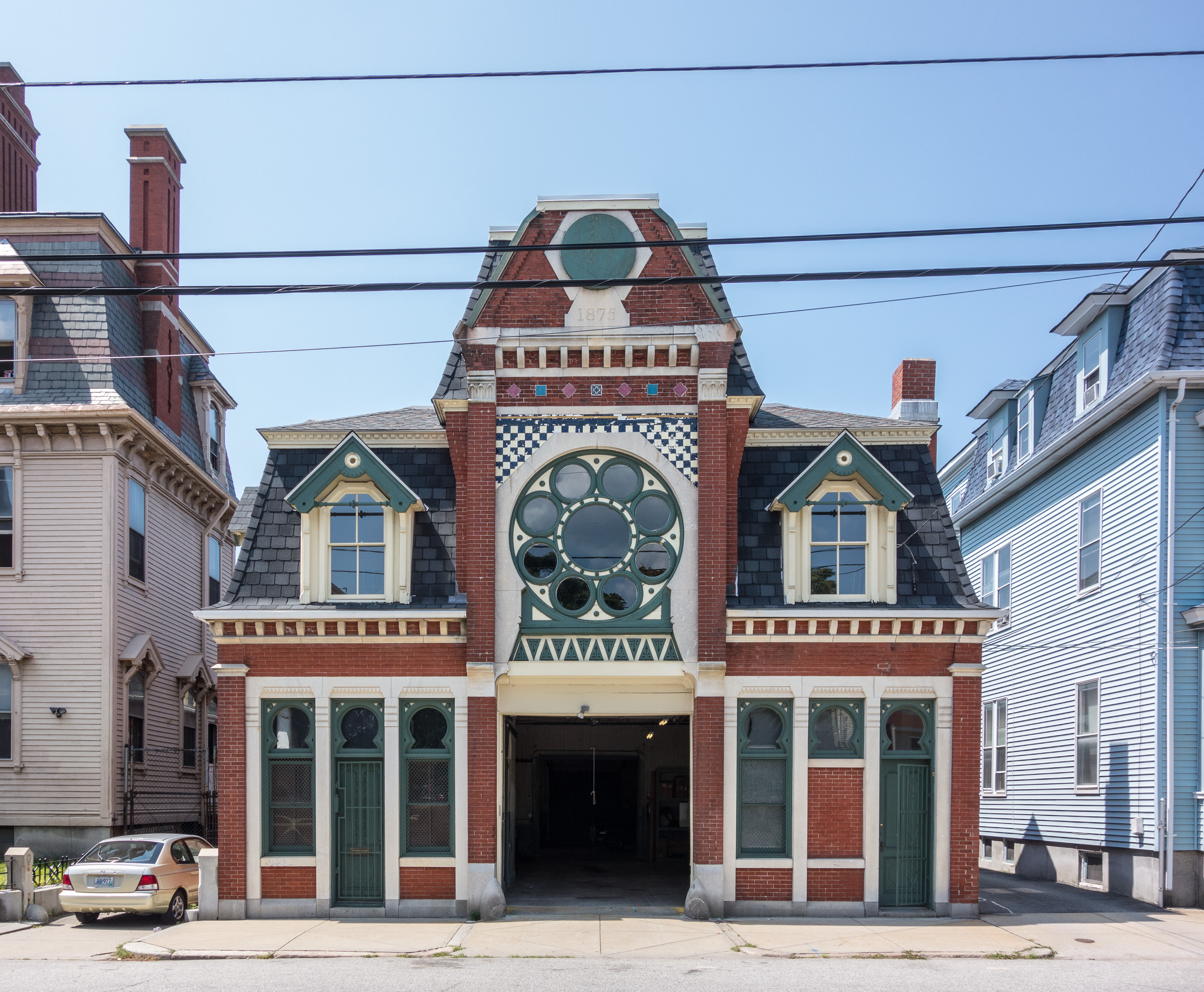
Eddy Estate Carriage House, Sutton Street

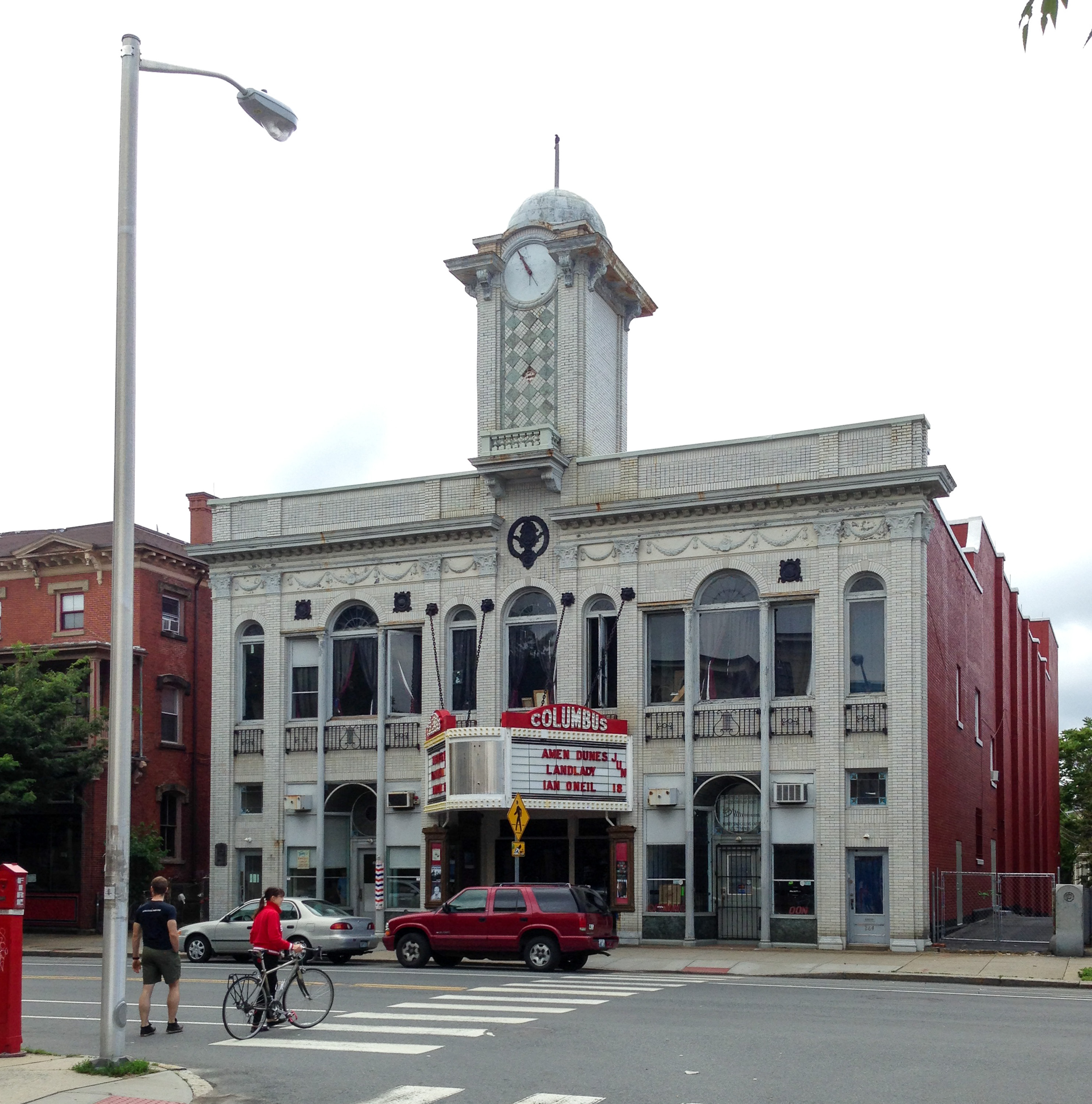
The Columbus Theatre, Broadway. Ca. 1900

== See also ==
- National Register of Historic Places listings in Providence, Rhode Island
