= Cranston Street Armory =

- U.S. Historic district – Contributing property
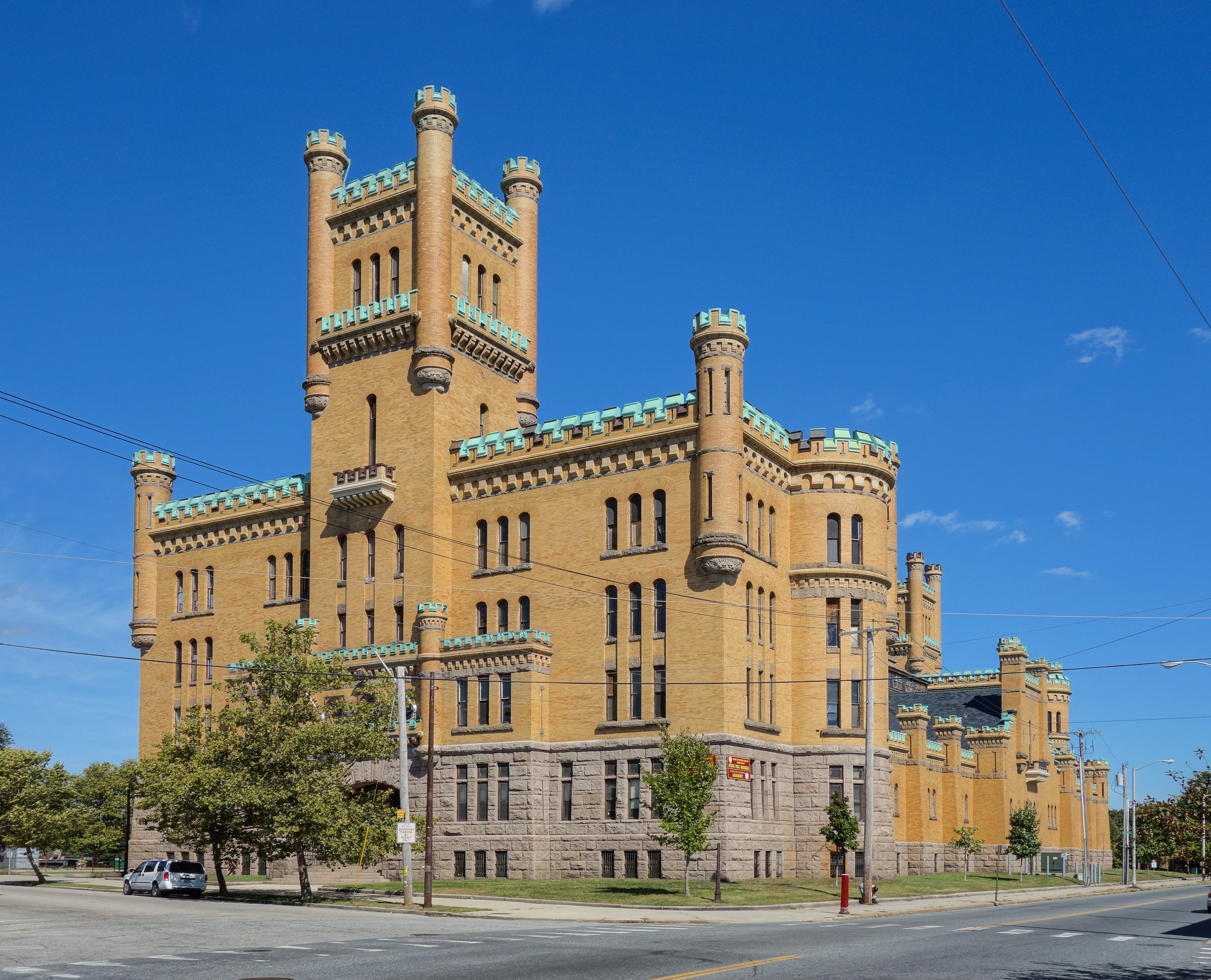
- The Cranston Street Armory in 2012
- Location: Providence, Rhode Island
- Coordinates: 41°48′45.59″N 71°25′49.75″W
- Built: 1907
- Architect: William R. Walker & Son
- Part of: Broadway-Armory Historic District (ID74000047)
- Added to NRHP: 1974

The Cranston Street Armory is an historic building in the Broadway–Armory Historic District of Providence, Rhode Island. It was built in 1907 at a cost of $650,000.00. The building was occupied by the Rhode Island National Guard from its opening until 1996. Since then, parts of the building have been used as film studios, and some of its offices occupied by the Rhode Island State Fire Marshal. The National Trust for Historic Preservation listed the Armory as one of "America's 11 Most Endangered Historic Places" in its annual list for 1997. Its distinctive yellow bricks, crenellated turrets, and decorative stonework mark it as a historically significant building and neighborhood icon.

== History ==
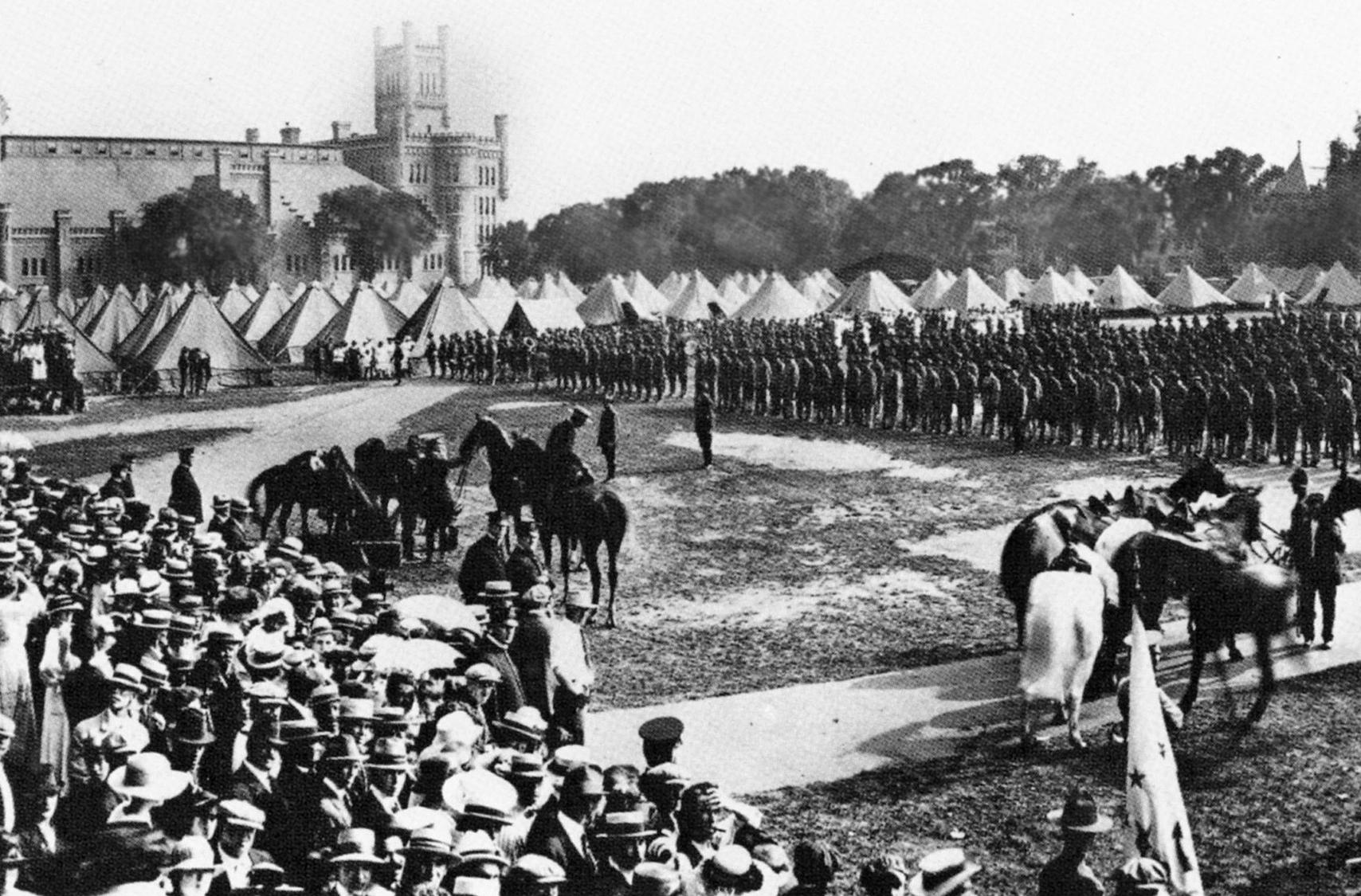
Troops assemble at the Dexter Training Ground on July 25, 1917

The architects were William R. Walker & Son and the builder was Michael J. Houlihan. The armory was built with a steel-truss frame, a large open central hall and two towers with a total of 165,000 square feet (15,300 m^{2}) of space. The main hall alone is as wide as two football fields. After World War I, the armory was used by 243rd Coast Artillery, 103rd Field Artillery Brigade, and in later years by the 43rd and 118th as well.

The films Outside Providence (1999) and Underdog (2007) were filmed using the open areas within the Armory for bluescreen work, as well as exterior shots of adjacent areas.

The Armory was used for several years by the Rhode Island Interscholastic League to host indoor track and field meets including the Rhode Island state championships and the Brown Invitational track meet.

== Decline ==
In 1981 the main hall was closed to public events due to structural problems. The National Guard however did not have the funds for the extensive repairs and upkeep required by the building's age.

As of 1986 the Cranston Street Armory was home to the following Rhode Island National Guard units:

- Headquarters and Headquarters Battery, 103d Field Artillery Brigade
- Headquarters and Headquarters Battery, 1st Battalion, 103rd Field Artillery Regiment
- Service Battery, 1st Battalion, 103rd Field Artillery Regiment
- A Battery, 1st Battalion, 103rd Field Artillery Regiment
- Headquarters and Headquarters Company, 43rd Military Police Brigade
- Headquarters and Headquarters Detachment, 118th Military Police Battalion
- 119th Military Police Company

Around 1990 the tenant units were transferred to other armories. The Field Artillery units were moved to the Armory of Mounted Commands in Providence and the Military Police units were moved to the Warwick Armory in Warwick.

In 1996 the State of Rhode Island took over the property, and the National Guard moved out the following year. After the state passed tax incentives to encourage filming in Rhode Island the armory served a brief stint as a sound stage. In 2004 a proposed bond issue to finance renovation and restoration of the armory was placed on the ballot and supported by the West Broadway Neighborhood Association, but did not pass. In recent years, the building has hosted car shows, inaugural balls, track meets, home shows and currently houses the office of the state fire marshal, and storage space for other Rhode Island state agencies. Today the building is in desperate need of repair. A small part of the building on the Parade Street side is occupied by the State of Rhode Island Fire Marshal and Bomb Squad, the main hall is used for storage. In 2014 Governor Chafee announced that the state would cut back on a renovation plan, and a state Senator proposed adding $3 million to the state budget for repairs.

In January 2015, Providence Mayor Jorge Elorza held his inauguration gala in the building. A few weeks later, it was named as one of 2015's "Most Endangered Properties" by the Providence Preservation Society, one of many times it has earned that distinction.

== Broadway–Armory Historic District ==
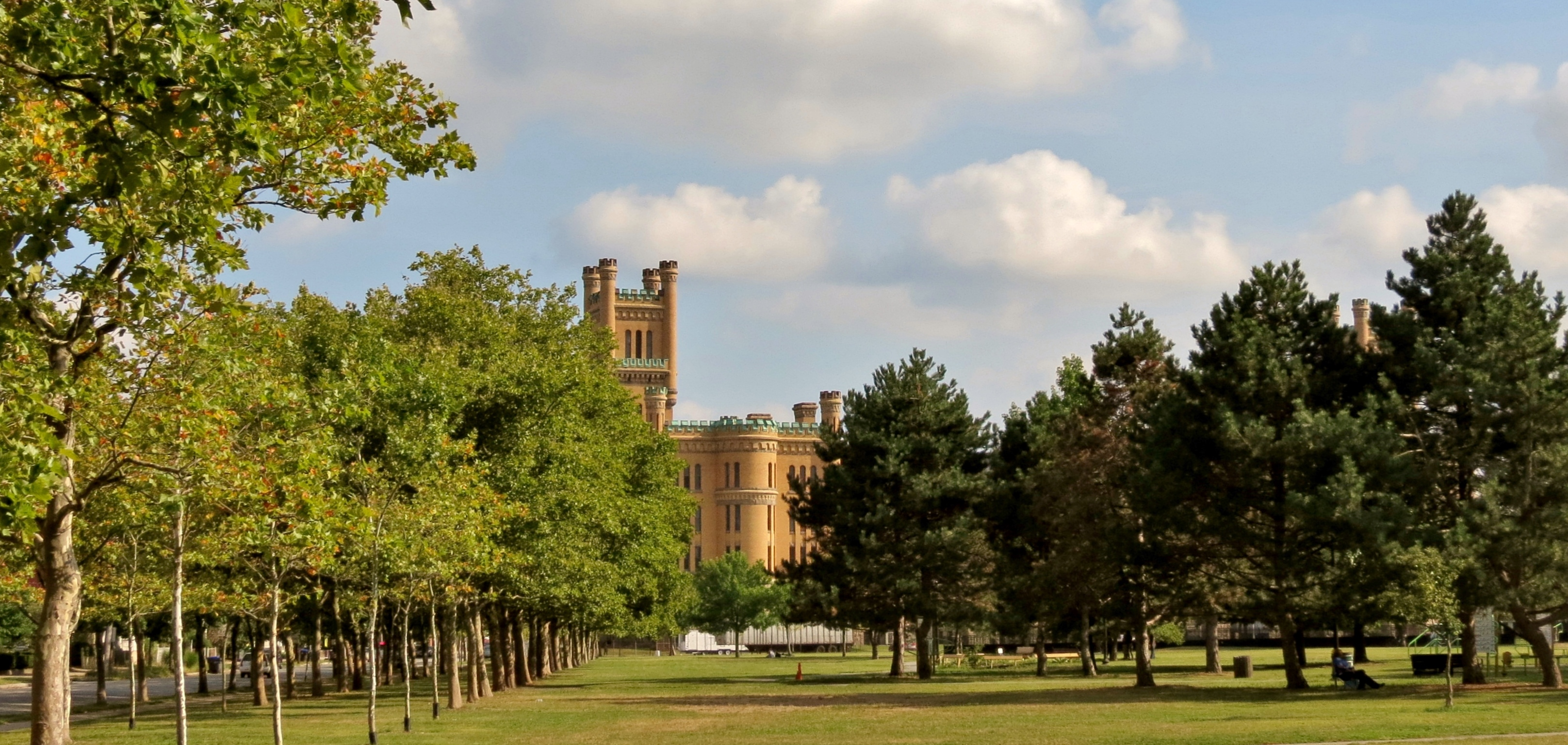
Armory Park, aka Dexter Training Ground

The Cranston Street Armory has lent its name to the surrounding area of Providence's West End, which is often known as the "Broadway–Armory Historic District." Several area businesses also take their name from this building. Most of the buildings in the area were built around 1840 to 1920.

=== Dexter Training Ground ===
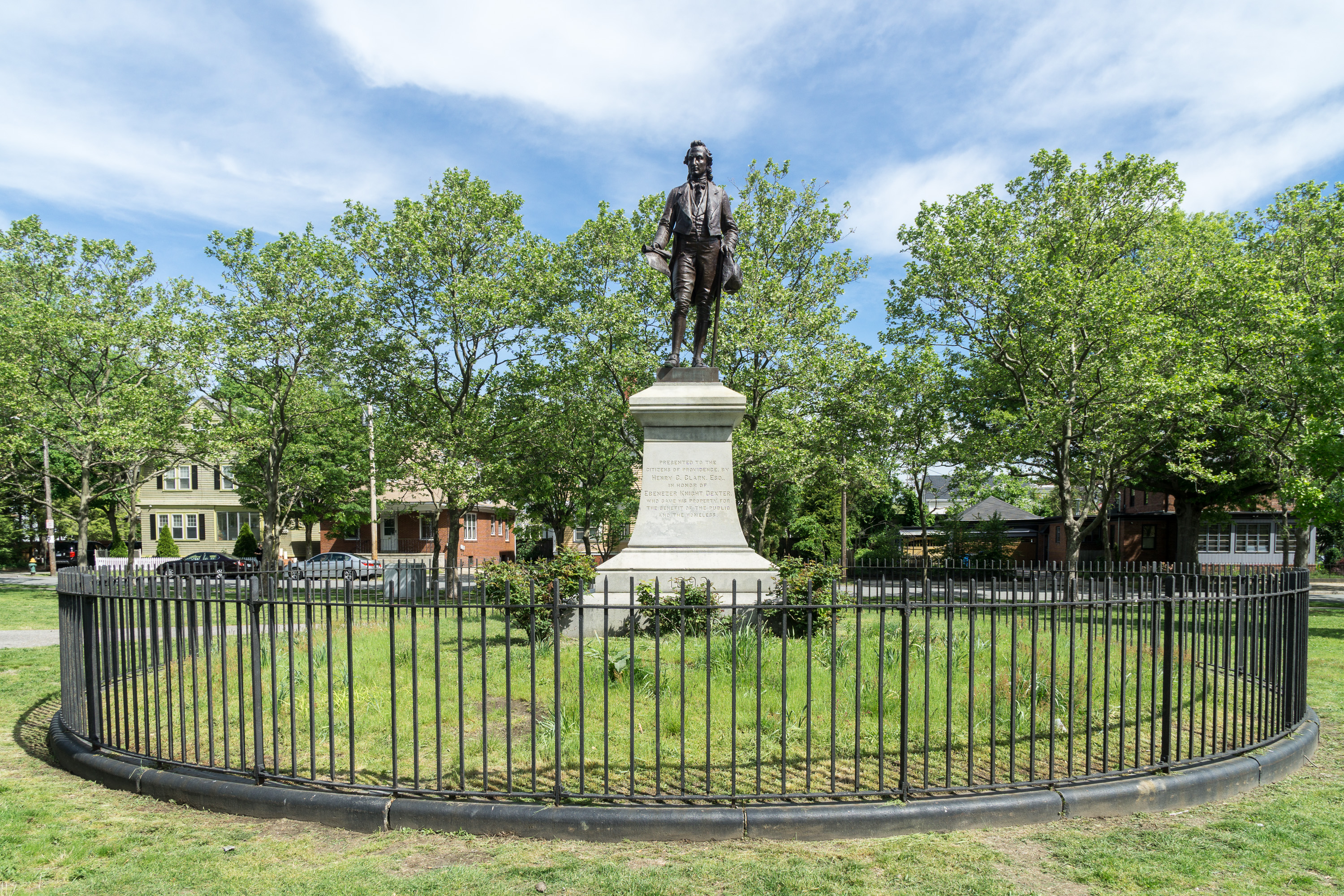
Statue of Ebenezer Knight Dexter

The Armory stands at the southern end of the Dexter Training Ground, a plot of land which was donated to the City of Providence by Ebenezer Knight Dexter for holding military exercises. The Training Ground was used as an encampment and drill field during the Civil War. The 14th Rhode Island Heavy Artillery Regiment, the first Black company from Rhode Island to serve in the Civil War, trained and camped here.

In July 1917, doughboys camped at Dexter Training Ground as they prepared to depart for Europe and World War I.

Today the land is a heavily used neighborhood park. The park features a playground, and attracts dog walkers and strollers. A statue of benefactor and namesake Ebenezer Knight Dexter stands in the northern end of the park.

In July 2020, mayor Jorge Elorza held an outdoor ceremony in Dexter Training Ground where he signed an executive order to come up with a "truth-telling and reparations process" in Providence.

== See also ==
- Broadway–Armory Historic District
