= City directory =

Listing of locations in a city

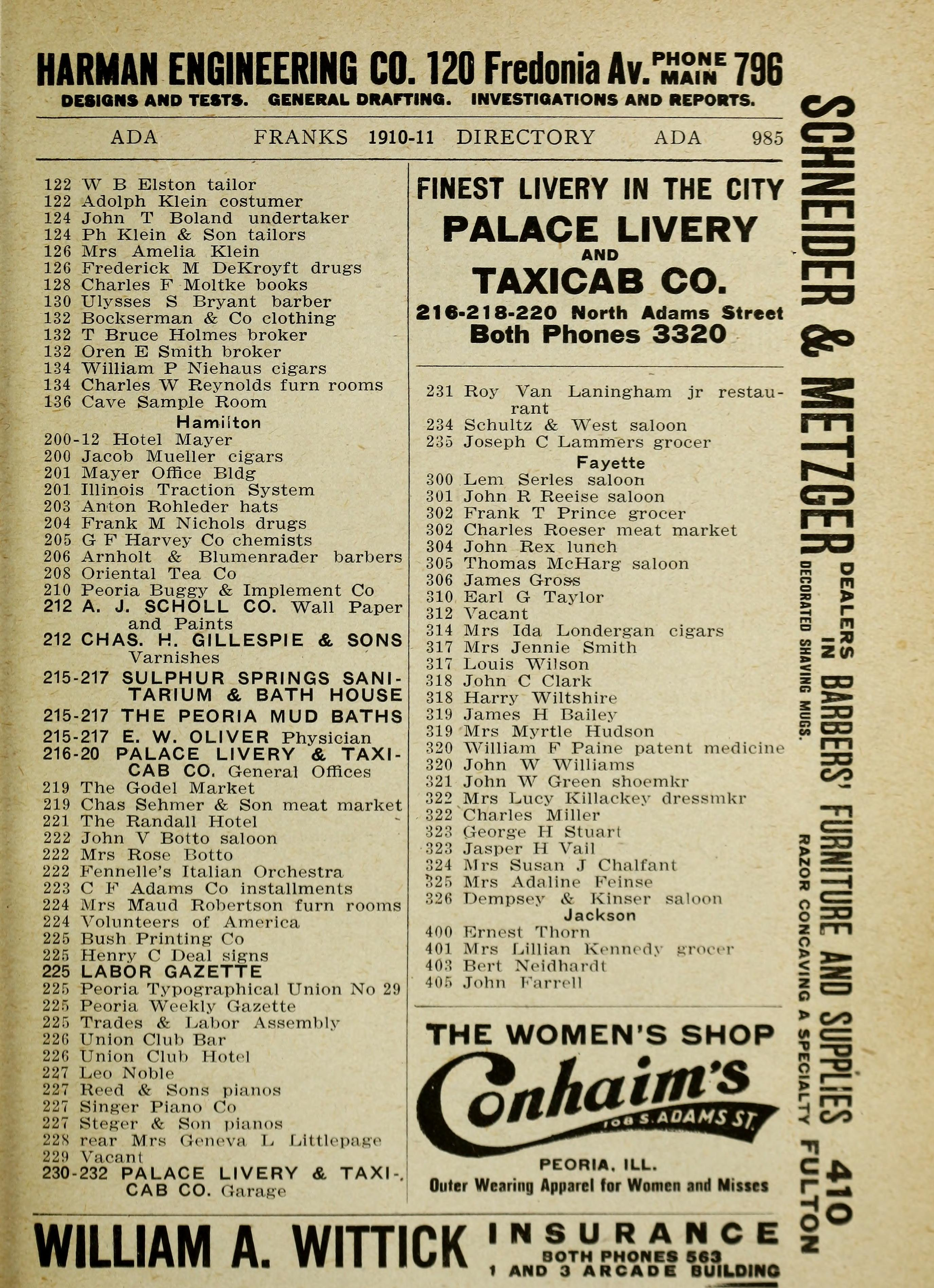
1910 directory page for North Adams Street, Peoria, Illinois

A city directory is a listing of residents, streets, businesses, organizations or institutions, giving their location in a city. It may be arranged alphabetically or geographically or in other ways.

== Information ==
Antedating telephone directories were in use for centuries. Many older directories have been digitized and are available on the open web and through subscription databases.

Examples include Kelly's Directory, R.L. Polk & Company, the Boston Directory, and the New York City Directory. Henderson's Directories were available for several cities in Canada.

== See also ==
- Pacific Bell Directory
- Mobile social address book
