= PicDial =

American social networking website

IQzone Inc.
- Type: Private
- Industry: Mobile/Wireless
- Founded: 2006
- Headquarters: Scottsdale
- Key people: John Kuolt & Michael Bates, Founders; Jim Wolfinger, President
- Website: www.picdial.com blog.picdial.com

PicDial was a mobile service created by IQzone Inc. and based in Scottsdale, Arizona, United States. PicDial provides users with the ability to automatically see their friends' Facebook and MySpace profile pictures and status messages as Full Screen Caller ID on their mobile phone. The software automatically keeps contacts social networking information current, allowing the most recent profile pictures and status messages to be displayed on incoming and outgoing calls or texts. The PicDial application provides users with a "Favorites Screen," a visual grid that allows users to call or text by selecting a friends social networking profile picture. This Mobile social address book platform allows users to link multiple social networks. The application also enables users to determine which picture will display when a call or text is made to a PicDial friend, giving the user control over the picture seen by friends. This defined picture can either be taken from the users camera on the phone, or pulled from their profile pictures on Facebook or MySpace. When a user changes their picture (and status message), this new image will be updated to their friends' phones.

The service also backs up contacts that reside on the mobile phone. If the phone is lost or stolen, PicDial subscribers have the capability to retrieve contact information.

PicDial is available for download on all the major US mobile networks, AT&T, Verizon, Sprint Nextel, T Mobile, Boost Mobile, Cellular South, and U.S. Cellular. The software is compatible with BlackBerry, iPhone, Java, Android, Symbian and Windows Mobile devices. It can be downloaded from various off deck sites, including Android Market, BlackBerry World, Apple Inc.'s App Store, and GetJar. Additionally, PicDial has been pre-loaded on a number of AT&T devices, including the Samsung Eternity II and Samsung Flight II.

== History ==
IQzone Inc. is a privately held company, that was founded in 2006 by a team of mobile veterans and entrepreneurs. IQzone's flagship product, PicDial, officially launched in July, 2010. The mobile application was first launched with wireless carrier AT&T on the AT&T Media Mall website. Shortly thereafter, PicDial launched with a number of carrier storefronts, including the Verizon V Cast Apps Store and Boost Mobile.

== Services ==
PicDial's mobile platform creates a social community among PicDial users, giving them the capability to:

- Text (SMS) Popup Notification with Facebook photo – Receive instant SMS popups with your friends profile picture and status. Includes quick reply capability.
- Text (SMS) Picture Carousel – Displays your friend's social network picture and status on the top half of the screen and the text thread on the bottom half.
- Full Screen Picture Caller ID – See FULL SCREEN profile pictures & status messages as caller ID every time you make or receive a call.
- Favorite Screen – Speed dial or text your friends by selecting their image from the PicDial favorite screen.
- Choose which picture of your friends that you want to see – either social network profile pic or from your phones gallery. Crop, fix, or change any picture.
- Address Book Backup – contacts are automatically backed up to the cloud
- Full SMS and MMS support coupled with integrated spell checking and additional message composition tools.
- Support for vCards (contact cards) allowing you increased MMS functionality.
- Speech to Text button
- Landscape Mode texting

== Privacy ==
PicDial is a registered mark of IQzone, Inc. More details on Terms of Use and Privacy Policy can be found under the legal section on PicDial's privacy policy pages.
