= Mobile social address book =

A mobile social address book is a phonebook on a mobile device that enables subscribers to build and grow their social networks. The mobile social address book transforms the phone book on any standard mobile phone into a social networking platform that makes it easier for subscribers to exchange contact information. The mobile social address book is the convergence of personal information management (PIM) and social networking on a mobile device. While standard mobile phonebooks force users to manually enter contacts, mobile social address books automate this process by enabling subscribers to exchange contact information following a call or SMS. The contact information exchange occurs instantaneously and the user's phonebook updates automatically. Mobile social address books also provide dynamic updates of contacts if their numbers change over time.

== History ==
The first Mobile social address book appeared in 2007 by a company called IQzone Inc., which was founded by John Kuolt. It was the first company to integrate social networking sites like Facebook, Myspace, Linked in and integrate them with the address book (PIM) of a mobile device. Mobile social address books sought to bring the connectivity of social networking to the in-the-moment experience of the mobile phone. Users can easily exchange contact information regardless of their handset, mobile carrier, or social networking application they use.

Examples of emerging companies providing technology to support mobile social address books include: PicDial (which dynamically augments the existing address book with pictures and status from Facebook, MySpace and Twitter, integrates with the call screen so during every call you see the latest picture and status of whoever is calling. It is a network address book so everything can be managed from Windows or Mac as well and lastly you can also set your one callerID picture and status for your friends to see when you call them) FusionOne (whose backup and synchronization solutions lets users easily transfer and update mobile content, including contact information, among different devices); Loopt (whose Loopt service provides a social compass alerting users when friends are near); OnePIN (whose CallerXchange person-to-person contact exchange service lets users share contact info with one click on the mobile phone); and VoxMobili (whose Phone Backup and Synchronized Address Book solutions let users safeguard and synchronize their contact information among different devices).

In 2007, the Rich Communication Services communication protocol was formed. RCS combines different services defined by 3GPP and Open Mobile Alliance (OMA) with an enhanced phonebook with broad implications for the mobile social address book. In a February 2017 Wired Magazine article, RCS was quoted as "...infected with bureaucracy, complexity, and irrelevance," by industry analyst Dean Bubley in 2015, calling RCS a zombie: dead, but somehow still ambling around. The same active goes on to say: "Google sees it differently. For the company with seemingly thousands of messaging platforms, each one with different features and different audiences, RCS presents an opportunity."
