= Industrial National Bank Building =

Skyscraper in Providence, Rhode Island

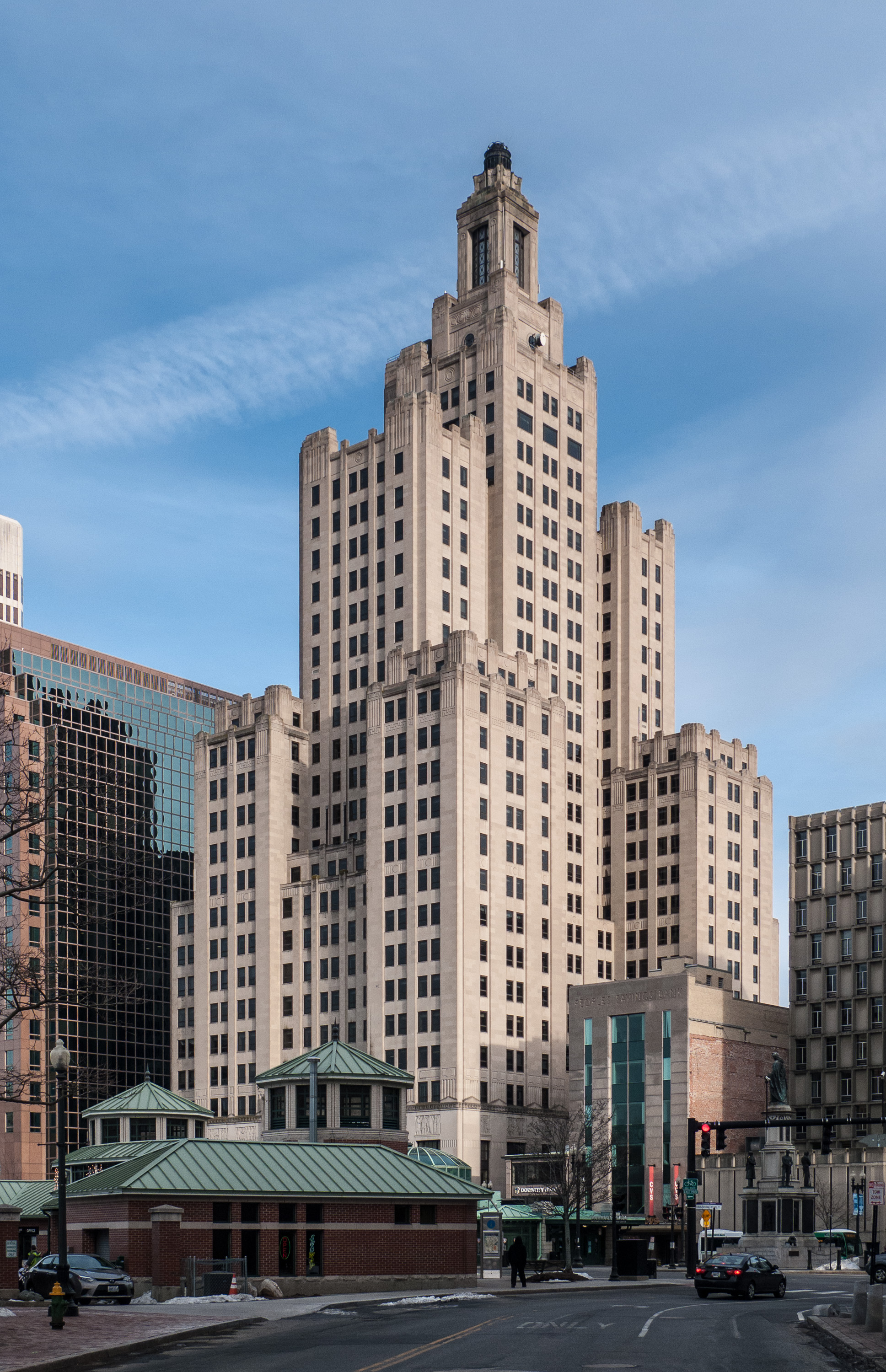
- The Industrial National Bank Building in 2017
- Former names: Industrial Trust Tower, Fleet Bank Building, Bank of America Building
- Alternative names: Superman Building, Industrial Trust Building

General information
- Status: Vacant since 2013
- Location: Kennedy Plaza, Providence, Rhode Island, United States, 111 Westminster Street
- Coordinates: 41.824553°N 71.410696°W
- Construction started: 1925
- Completed: 1928
- Owner: High Rock Development

Height
- Roof: 428 ft (130 m)

Technical details
- Material: Limestone exterior/steel framework
- Floor count: 26

Design and construction
- Architects: Walker & Gillette; George Frederic Hall
- Developer: Industrial Trust Company

The Industrial National Bank Building is a disused office building at 111 Westminster Street or 55 Kennedy Plaza in downtown Providence, Rhode Island, United States. It was built in 1928 as the Industrial Trust Co. Building, and was designed by the New York firm of Walker & Gillette. At 428 feet (130 m) with 26 floors, it is the tallest building in Providence and the state of Rhode Island, and the 28th tallest in New England; when it was completed it stood several stories higher than the recently finished Biltmore Hotel nearby.

Known through the years as the "Fleet Bank Tower", the "Bank of America Building", and, most recently, "111 Westminster", locally it is commonly referred to as the "Superman Building", supposedly because of its visual similarity to the headquarters of the Daily Planet newspaper as represented in The Adventures of Superman TV series of the 1950s.

The building has been vacant since Bank of America moved out in April 2013. An estimate in 2016 was that it would take $115 million to rehabilitate the building. Requests for public financing were rejected in 2017. Work began in November 2023 to renovate the building for residential use, with a promised 285 residential units, including 57 affordable units.

== Early history ==
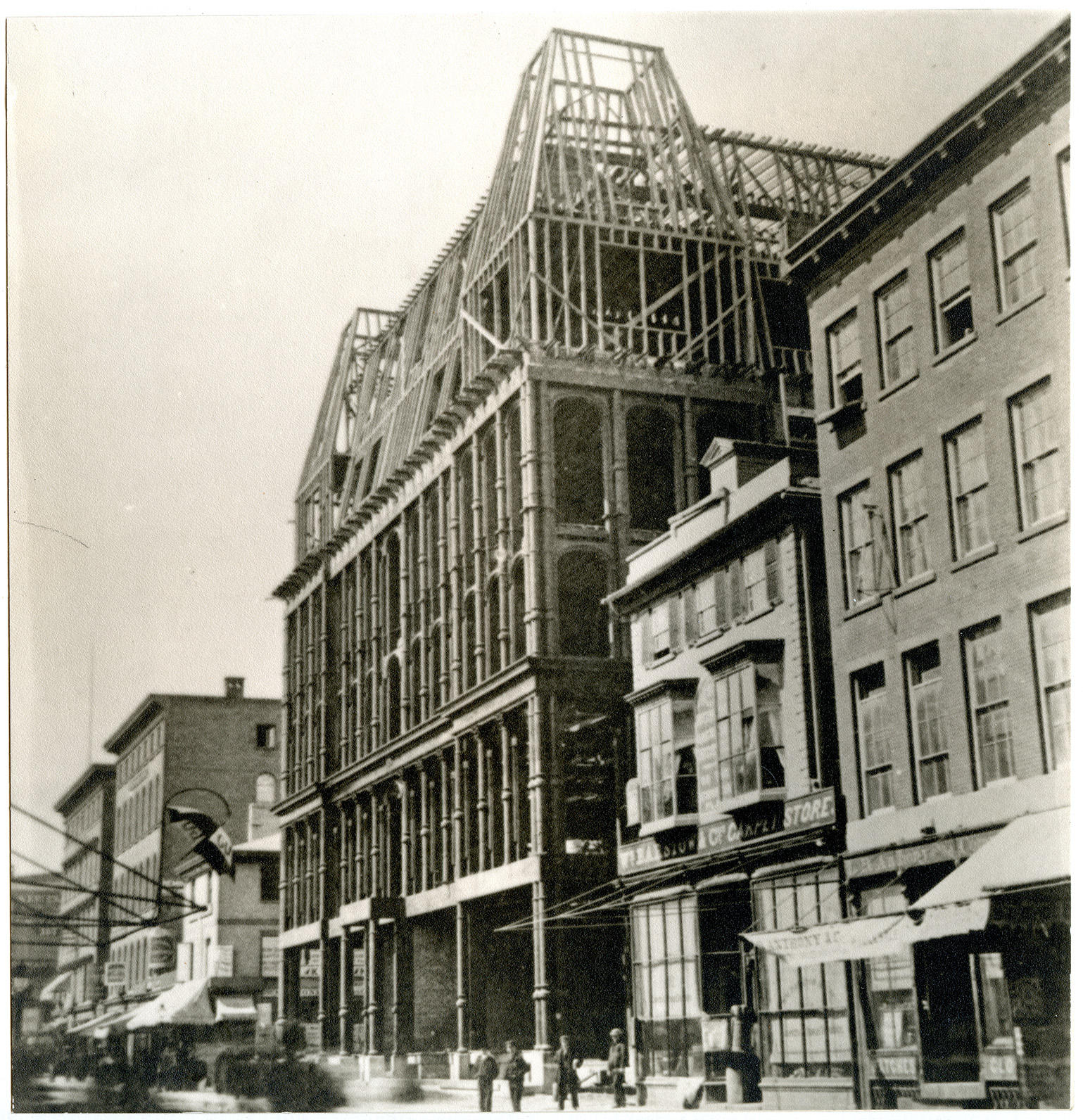
The Butler Exchange Building under construction (1872)

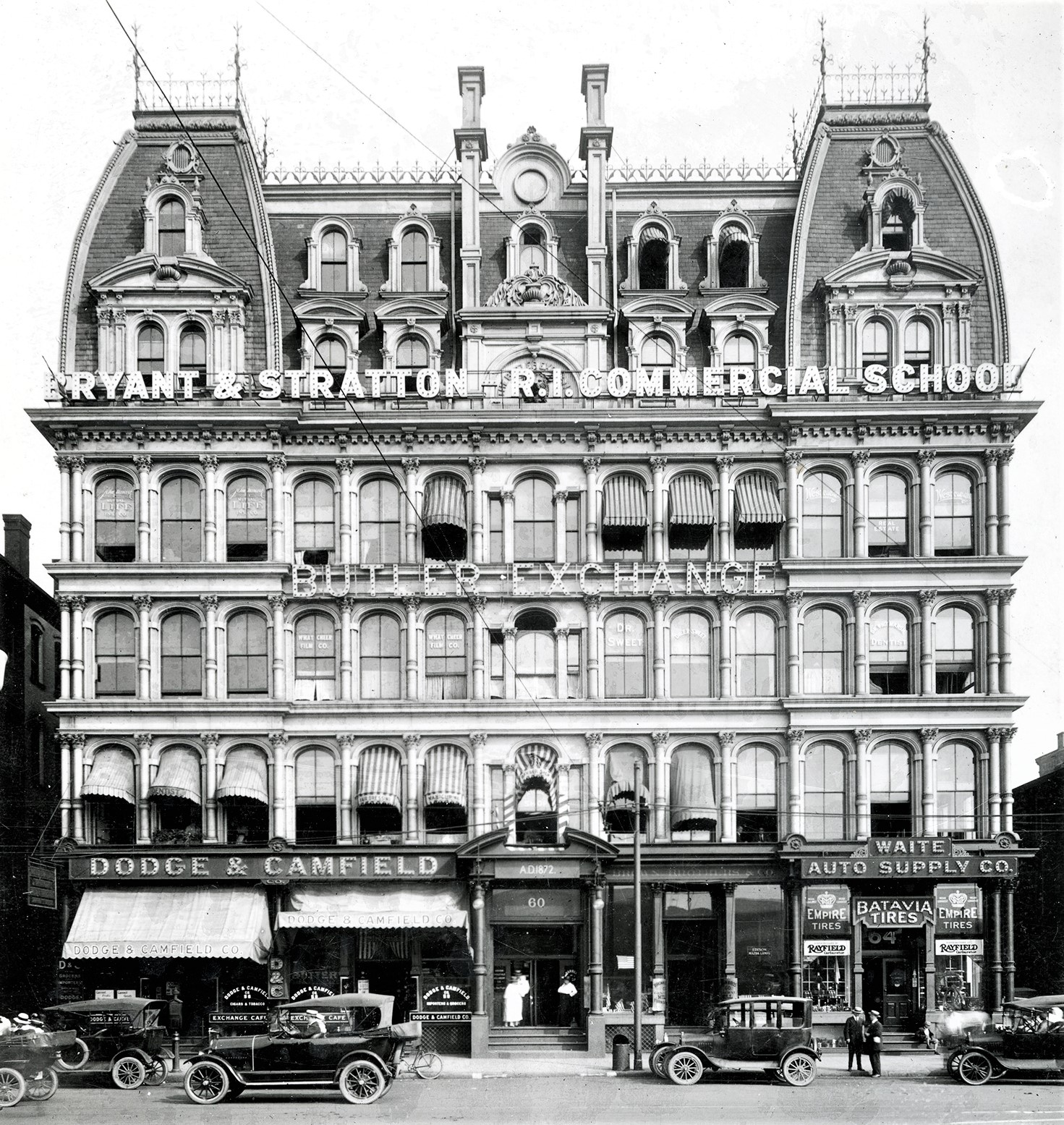
The Butler Exchange Building (c. 1920)

=== Butler Exchange Building ===
Before the current building was erected, the site was the location of the six-story Butler Exchange Building. Located at 55 Exchange Place and constructed in 1872, the land was purportedly deeded by the heirs of the original Samuel Butler. Due to address changes across the city, by 1913 it bore the address 123 Westminster. The 1872 building housed the Rhode Island Commercial School which was purchased and merged into Bryant & Stratton College in 1916, the forerunner of Bryant University. It housed many retail businesses such as Dodge and Camfield, importers and grocers; A. & L. Tirocchi Gowns; and the Waite Auto Supply Company. The Providence Ladies' Sanitary Gymnasium was also a tenant. After a devastating fire, the Butler Exchange Building was demolished in 1925, to make way for a new tower, though the community did not like the plans for the building because of its height, construction materials, and design.

=== Industrial Trust Company ===
Commissioned in 1925 by the Industrial Trust Company – founded in 1886 by Samuel P. Colt – the current building was constructed in 1927–1928. During the inter-war boom period as the Industrial Trust Tower. Designed in the Art Deco style popular at the time, the building opened for tenants on October 1, 1928.

It was renamed the Fleet Bank Tower when Industrial Trust changed its name to Fleet Financial Group in 1982. It remained Fleet's headquarters until Fleet merged with Shawmut National Bank in 1995 and moved to Boston. Fleet retained ownership of the building even after it merged with BankBoston as FleetBoston Financial in 1998.

In 2004, FleetBoston Financial was acquired by Bank of America, and the building became the Bank of America Building. In 2007, Bank of America invested $7 million in a new sprinkler and fire safety system. The building was purchased in 2008 by High Rock Development of Massachusetts for $33.2 million. At the time, Bank of America was the building's sole tenant and utilized about half the building. David Sweetser, who led High Rock Development, initially anticipated that he would be able to use the building as an office skyscraper and lease out the other space.

== Vacancy and redevelopment ==
In 2011, media reports speculated that Bank of America would move out at the end of its ten-year lease. In 2012, Bank of America, still the sole tenant, decided not to renew its lease, at which point it used only 20% of the building. The bank vacated the building in 2013, leaving it empty; the move took Sweetser by surprise, since he expected the bank to renew its lease. An independent appraisal was completed in 2012, and in 2014 the Providence group Scotti and Associates used that appraisal to decide that the building had "no value." The Wall Street Journal wrote in 2025 that the building's prolonged abandonment had negatively impacted economic activity around Providence City Hall.

=== Lawsuit ===
In 2013, High Rock sued Bank of America for millions of dollars, claiming that the bank had neglected upkeep of the building and left it in a deteriorating state. The building is pockmarked with gaps of missing limestone, and is surrounded by scaffolding to prevent injuries to passers-by. High Rock brought suit in the United States District Court for the District of Rhode Island, claiming that the bank failed to meet its repair and replacement obligations under a long-term lease, rendering the building unleasable. High Rock sought up to $54 million in damages. The bank brought a counterclaim seeking recovery of monies spent removing furniture from the building after the lease expired. The counterclaim was subsequently dismissed by the court (Smith, J.), and the case was scheduled for trial in May 2017. Shortly after jury empanelment, the bank settled the suit on confidential terms.

=== Redevelopment efforts ===
==== Initial efforts ====
When Bank of America moved out, High Rock initially wanted to convert the building to apartments. In 2013, it requested up to $15 million in tax credits from the city and $39 million in funding from the state. High Rock's request was turned down, in part because an unprofitable loan to 38 Studios in 2012 had turned public sentiment away from public funds. Sweetser tried to lease the Industrial Trust Building to companies such as Samsonite or Citizens Bank, both of which declined the offer after seeing the building's dilapidated condition.

The next redevelopment proposal came in 2016 after Sweetser unsuccessfully spent a year negotiating with Citizens Bank. This alternative four-year plan that would require $40 million in new funding for the rehabilitation of the tower into a mix of uses that include retail, business and 285 residential units. The proposals were met with mixed reaction with several individuals noting High Rock Development has $200 million available to put toward rehabilitation but has declined to do so. It was estimated that at least $115 million would be needed to rehabilitate the building. The building opened to the public for limited free tours during mid-2016.

In December 2017, Paolino Properties and Gilbane Development announced a plan that would involve demolishing the building and replacing it with a new 36-story building housing Hasbro's headquarters. There was still no definite plan for the building by the next year. A representative of High Rock said in February 2019 that the owners were maintaining the building, even though drone footage from a local news source showed that the facade was visibly deteriorating. Due to the building's continued abandonment, the National Trust for Historic Preservation placed the building on a list of America's Most Endangered Places in 2019. The Industrial Trust Building also appeared on the Providence Preservation Society's list of most endangered places multiple times.

==== 2020s efforts ====
The building was nearly auctioned off in 2021 after High Rock failed to pay back taxes, but the auction was averted after High Rock pledged to pay the taxes. That year, High Rock reportedly submitted plans to the Rhode Island government to convert the building into a 285-unit apartment structure. In April 2022, officials including Governor Dan McKee announced plans to convert the Industrial National Bank Building into 285 residential units, at a cost of $220 million. One-fifth of the units would be affordable. Though the building would be mostly residential, it would also include community space, 8,000 square feet (740 m^{2}) of offices and a banking hall covering 26,000 square feet (2,400 m^{2}). That October, a panel of the Providence City Council approved a proposed tax treaty that would allow High Rock to save $29 million over a 30-year period. The full City Council approved the tax treaty the next month. The city government also offered to give the developers a $5 million grant and $10 million loan, and the state government offered $26 million, all conditional on a certificate of occupancy being issued.

In October 2023, High Rock Development requested building permits from the Providence city government, in preparation for an apartment conversion. Consigli Construction was selected as the general contractor for the project. The first phase, which entailed interior demolition and asbestos abatement, would cost approximately $25 million and would take six to nine months. This phase would not involve the use of any public funds, and noted that their plans were to be carried out as a "top-down process beginning on the upper floors of the building". Work began the next month to renovate the building for residential use. The cost of renovation had increased to $270 million by late 2024 due to inflation, increased interest rates, and increases in construction expenses. Early the next year, the United States Department of Transportation determined that the building qualified for a federal loan of up to $236 million.

High Rock and Providence Mayor Brett Smiley requested in May 2025 that the Rhode Island General Assembly modify the state's tax code. The modification was approved shortly afterward, exempting the project from $4.6 million in sales taxes for construction materials. Sweetser died that July, creating uncertainty over whether the project would proceed, since High Rock did not have a clear leader or any other properties in Providence. The next month, Michael Crossen of High Rock took over the conversion.

== Architecture ==
The building alongside other Providence structures

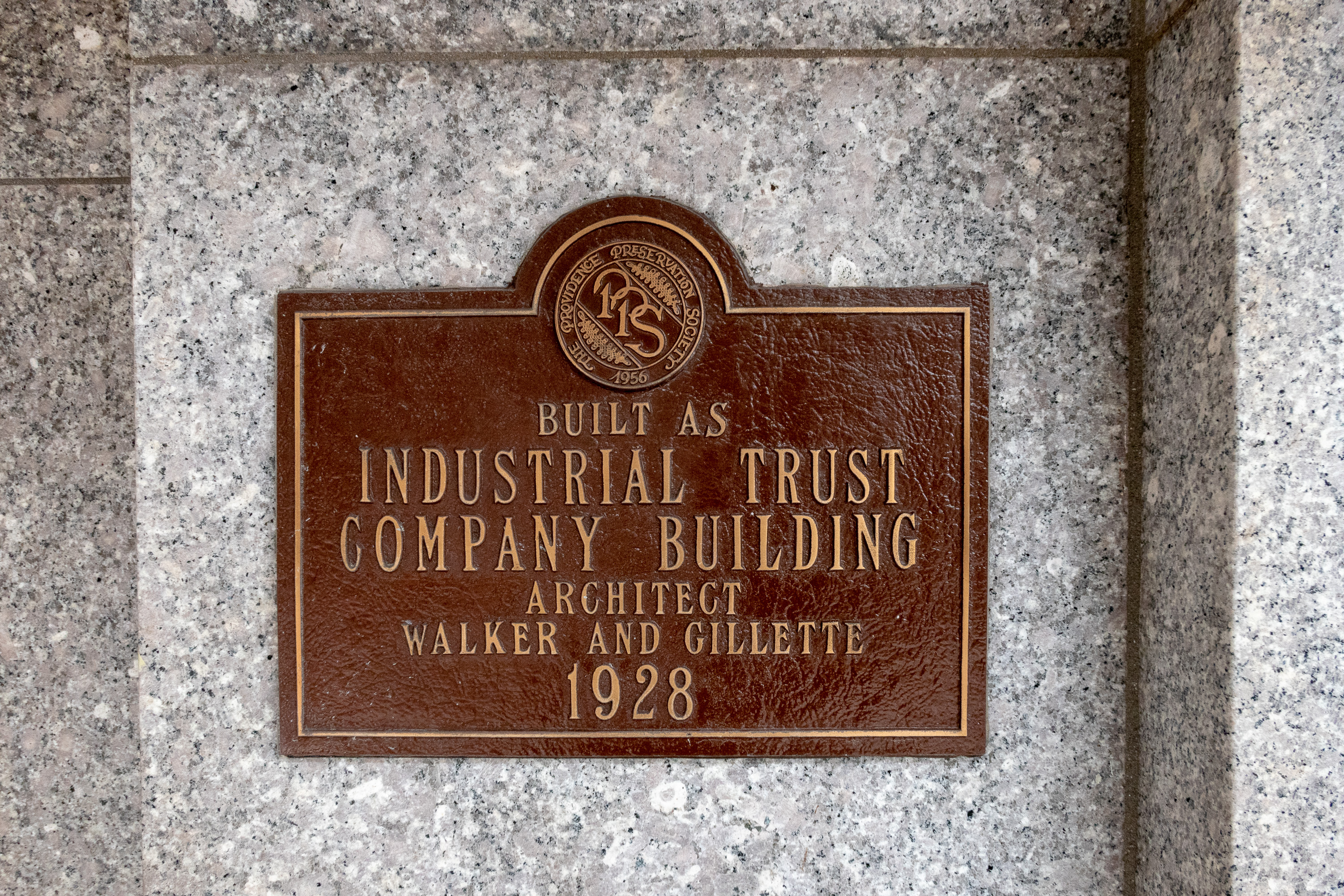
Historic plaque

The building is a steel-frame structure sheathed in Indiana limestone, with Deer Isle granite at its base. The tower was advertised as "A Business Building for Building Business". It has six wings stemming from a central tower.

=== Form and facade ===
The Industrial Trust Building rises 26 stories ans measures 428 feet (130 m) tall. It has setbacks at floors 5, 12, 14, 17, 18, 26 and 30, which form the building's distinctive profile. The setback style originated in Manhattan, New York City, in response to the 1916 zoning law which sought to increase the amount of air and light in downtown Manhattan, but when this building was being planned in late 1925 or early 1926, very few buildings of this type had been built elsewhere in the U.S. There were no such zoning restrictions in Providence. Nevertheless, New York architects Walker & Gillette chose to include the innovative symmetrical stepped massing, with the assistance of local architect George Frederic Hall. Starrett Corporation was the general contractor.

The base and the trim at the base's top were built to match the cornice height of existing adjacent (now gone) four-story buildings. It was among the tallest buildings in New England when completed, and ranked third after its construction to the 1919 Travelers Tower (at 527 feet/161 m) in Hartford, Connecticut, and the 1915 expansion of the Custom House Tower, at 496 feet (151 m), in Boston. The majority of relief art is found on the cornice of the tower's base, where there are 16 carved panels and depictions of the Providence and Rhode Island seals.

=== Interior ===
A ground-level hall runs through the building from Westminster Street to Fulton Street. Staircases at either end of the hall descend to the first basement level, while a wide marble staircase ascends to a three-story-high banking room on the first floor, just above ground level. The first basement had offices for the Rhode Island Safe Deposit Company, and a second basement below it included a safe-deposit vault. designed by Frederick S. Holmes. The first-floor banking room had black-marble pillars, counters with bronze grilles, and 40 tellers' windows. A balcony ran across the banking room, leading to men's and women's lounges with fireplaces at either end. The banking room had white-and-gray floors and walls, with red and black squares embedded into the floor. The ceiling had red and gold decorations and three domes, each with an elaborate chandelier. A multicolored frieze with medallions surrounded the top of the walls.

The upper-story offices were accessed from the southeast. The 26th floor hosted the executive office of Industrial Trust Company. The suite contains secretary staff common areas, dining room and offices. A stairway leads to the higher north-face 29th level private 'dining car' or Gondola room designed to resemble the gondola of an airship; the room contains a wine closet and dark leather details. A peregrine falcon nest box is located in the area. The 28th and 29th floors contain a gravity water-service system; two large tanks on these levels feed the building. The 29th floor contains a lavatory for service to the Gondola rooms and adjoining balconies.

The metal doors and trim were manufactured by Dahlstrom Metallic Door Company of Jamestown, New York. Some of the street-level doors possess relief art of eagles in brass. The original glass of the beacon was of a green hue, and topped with a decorative globe, surrounded by a circle of stone eagles weighing 7.5 tons (6.8 tonnes). In 1932, it was damaged and repaired after a lightning strike.

== Gallery ==
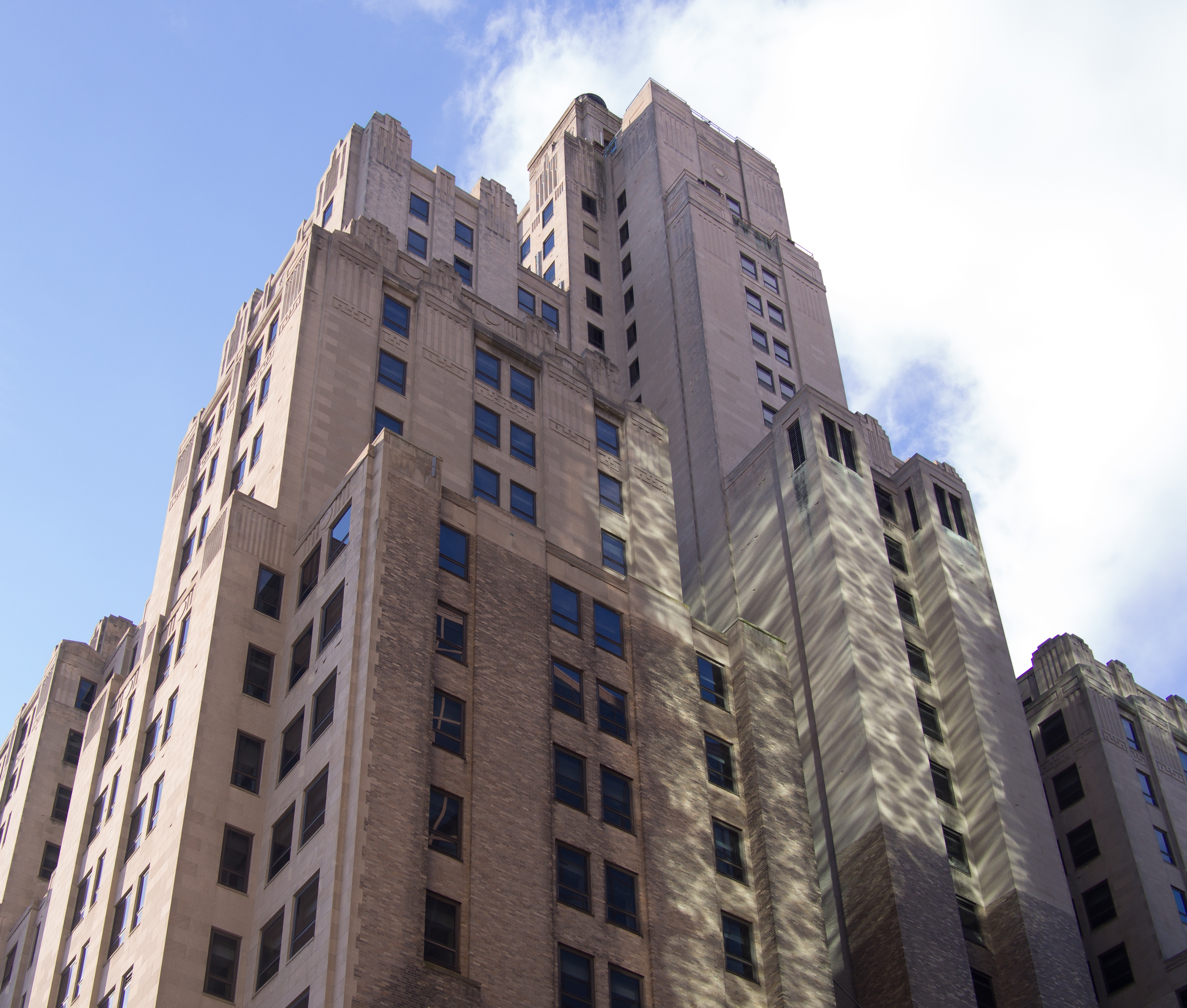
An upwards facing view of the building

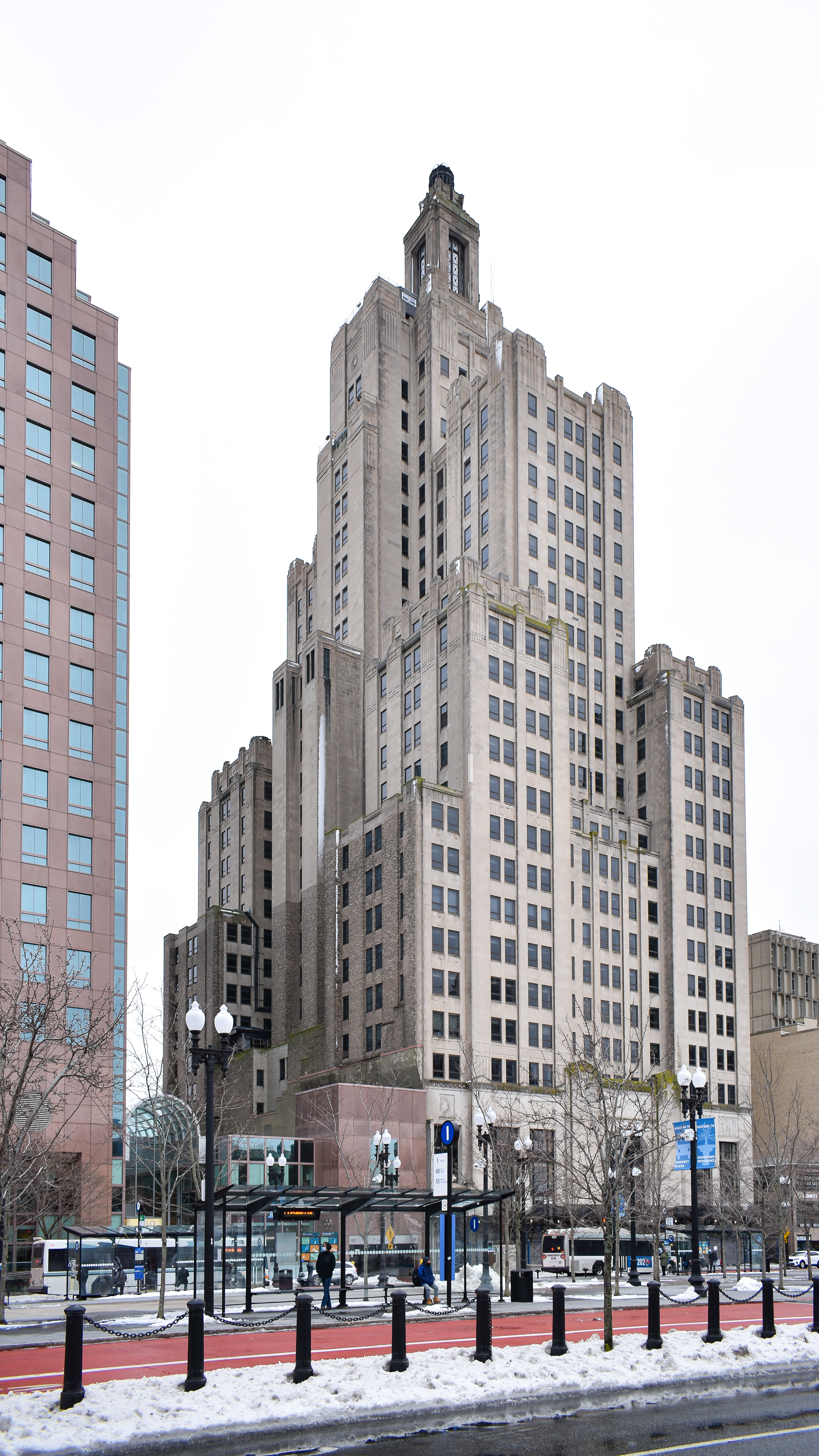
The building from Kennedy Plaza

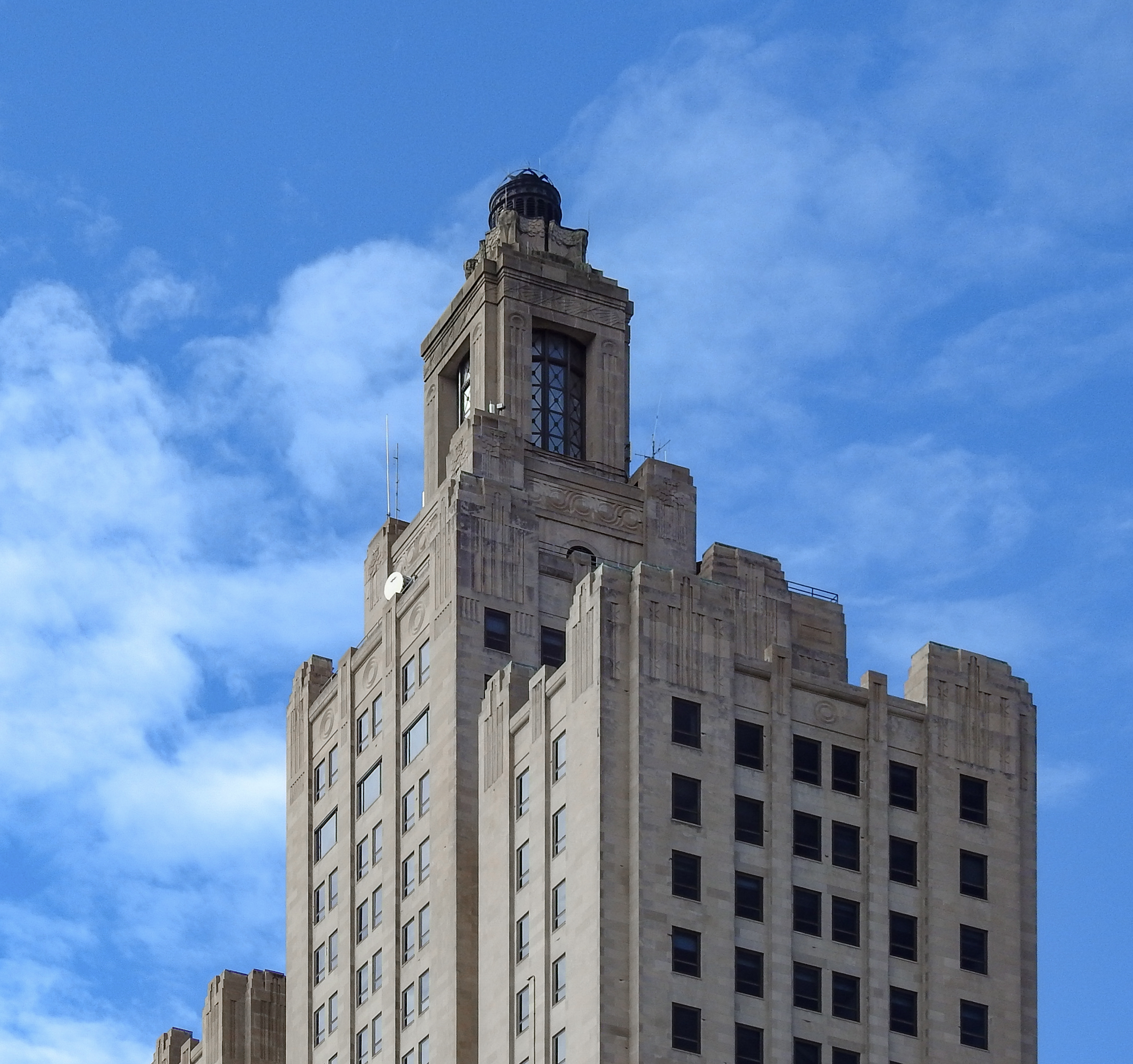
The top of the building

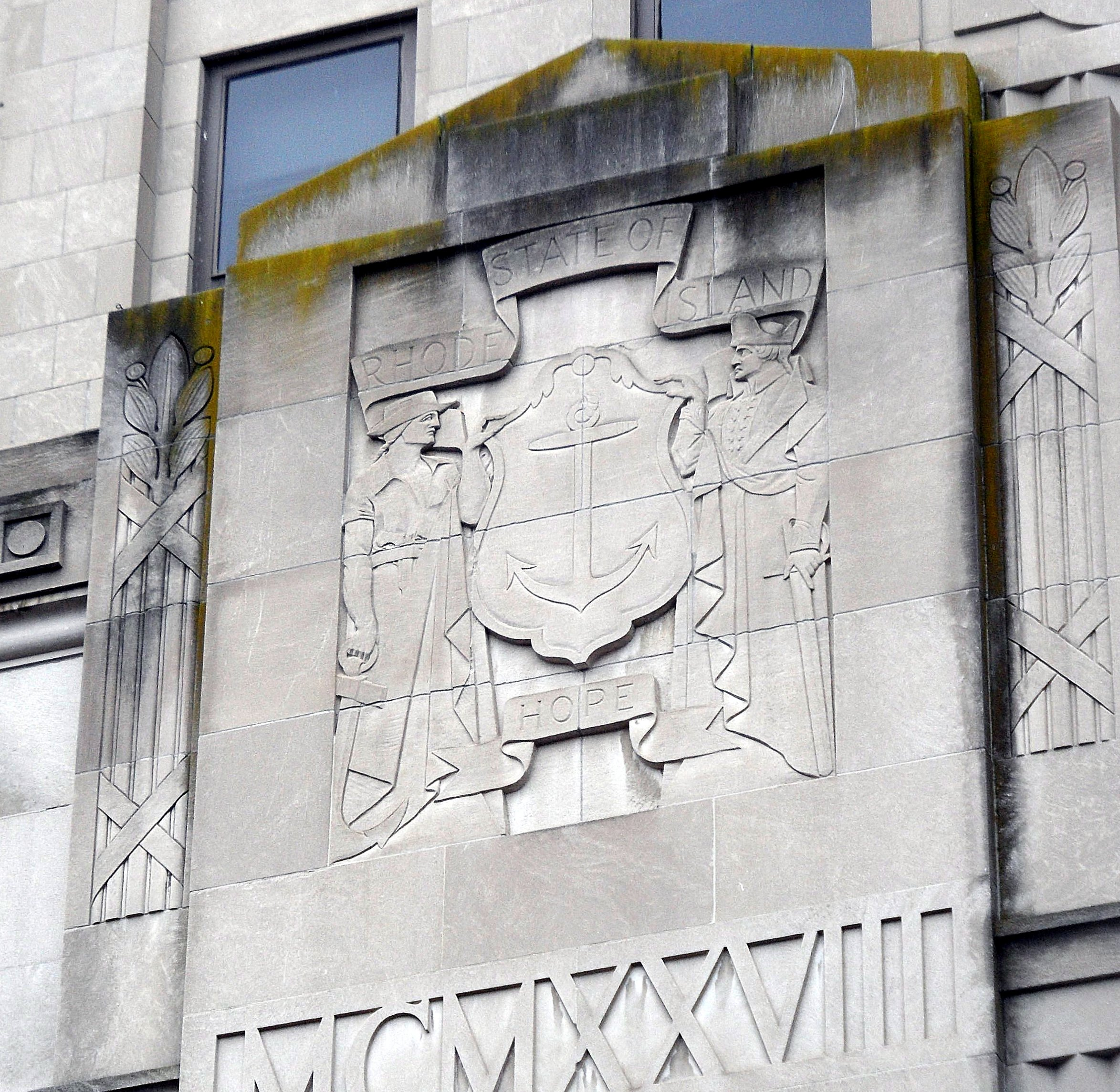
Relief on facade

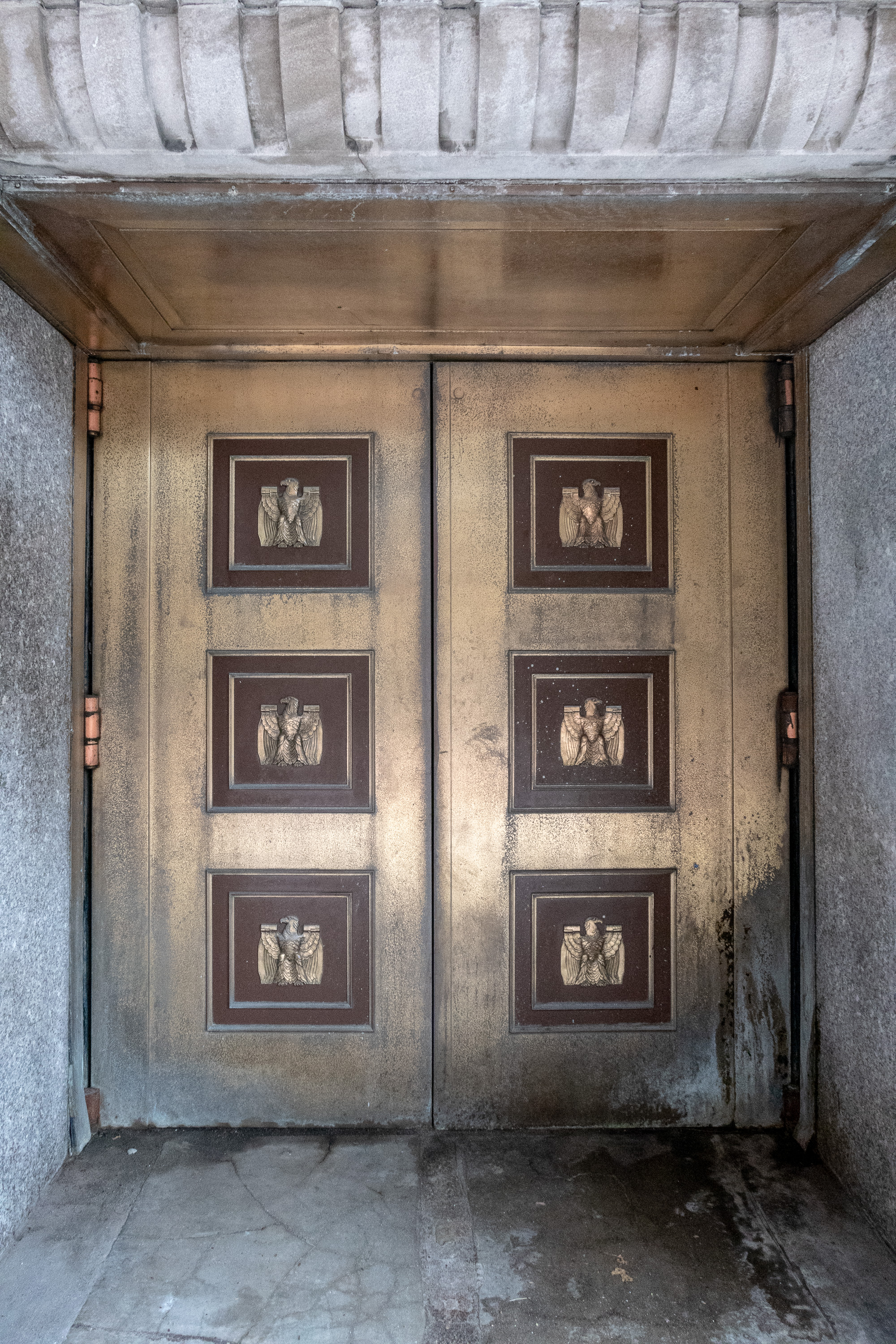
Main doors

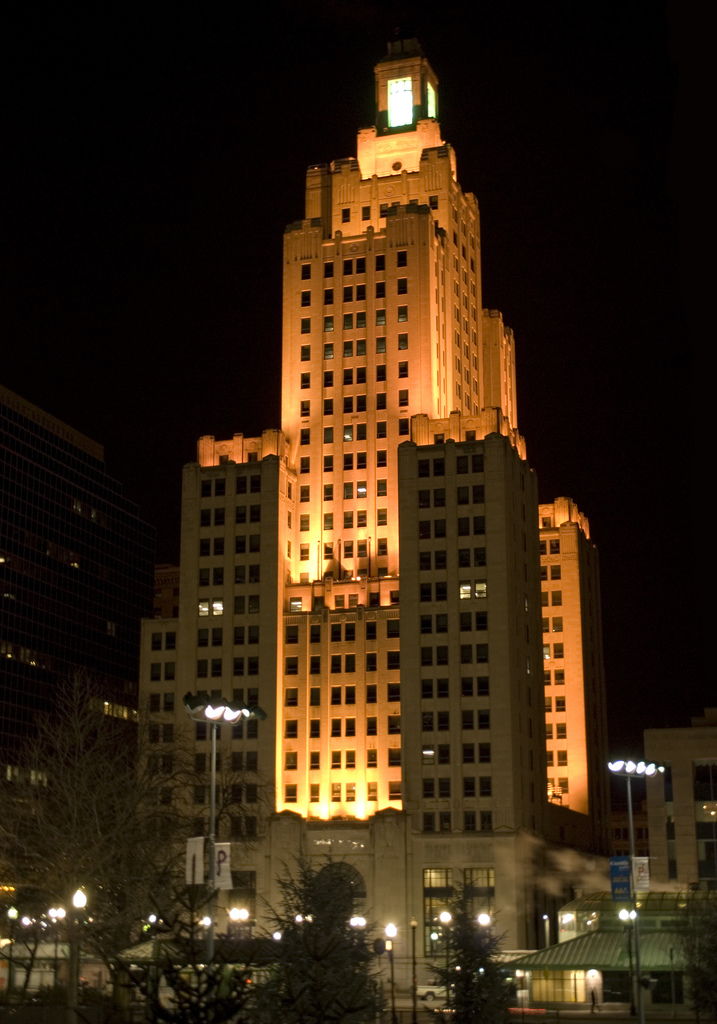
The building at night

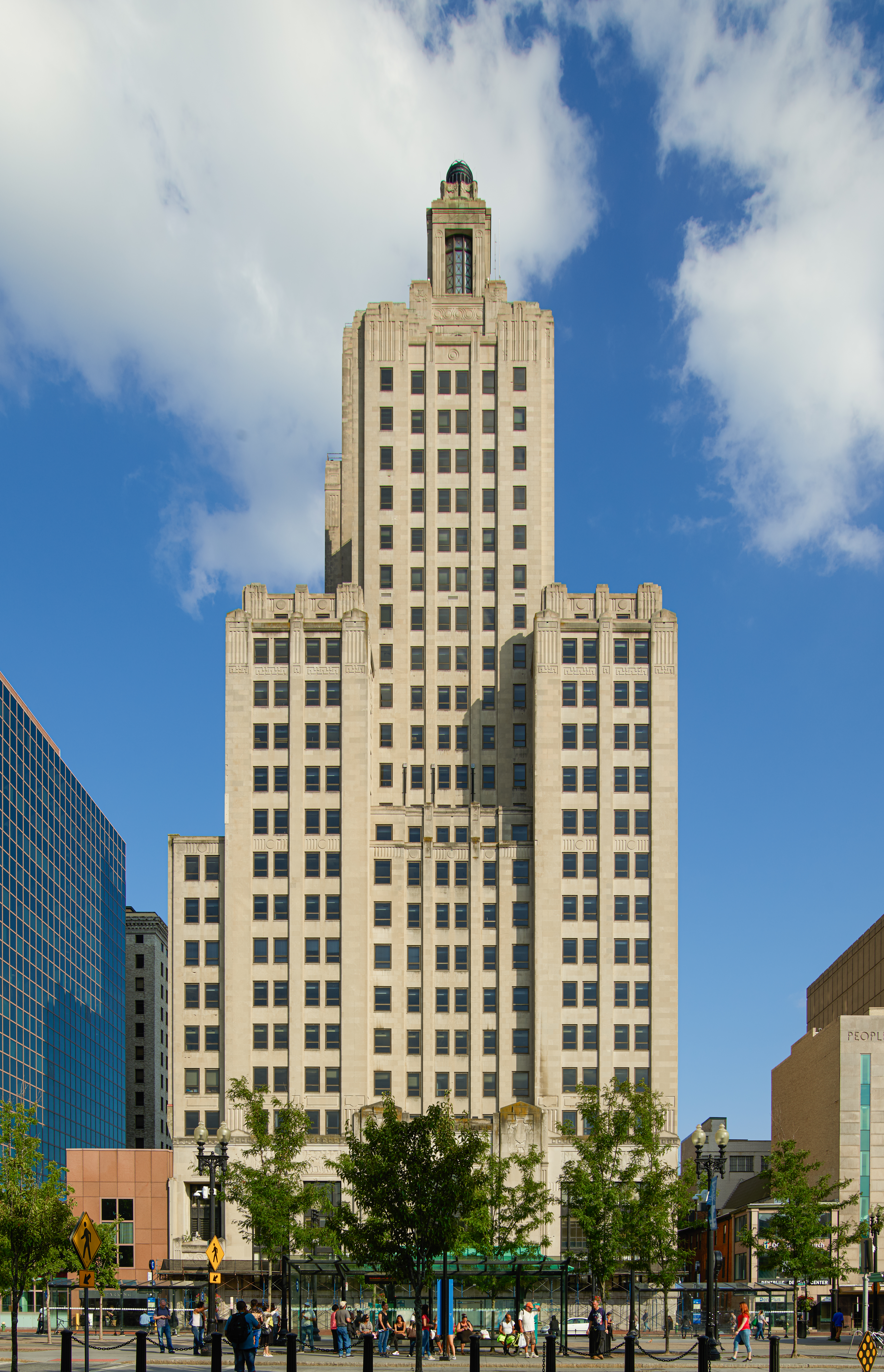
The structure in 2018 from Kennedy Plaza

== In popular culture ==
- Despite its resemblance to the Daily Planet building in the Superman comic book, Superman co-creator Joe Shuster claims he drew his inspiration not from the Providence building (nor the also rumored AT&T Huron Road Building in Cleveland, Ohio, where Shuster was living at the time), but rather from his home city of Toronto (such as the Commerce Court North and the Fairmont Royal York). The building shown in the Adventures of Superman television program, however, is the Los Angeles City Hall.
- The Industrial Trust building is featured in H. P. Lovecraft's final story, "The Haunter of the Dark" (1935), where the narrator mentions that the red beacon at the top of the building "had blazed up to make the night grotesque." In his personal letters, Lovecraft compared the Industrial Trust building to the Lighthouse of Alexandria.
- The building and its neighbors are displayed prominently on the skyline of the fictional City of Quahog, Rhode Island, the setting of the American adult animated sitcom Family Guy.

== See also ==
- List of tallest buildings by U.S. state

Preceded by Rhode Island State House	Tallest Building in Providence; 1927–present 130 m	Succeeded by None
