= Frederick S. Peck =

Rhode Island businessman and politician

Frederick Stanhope Peck
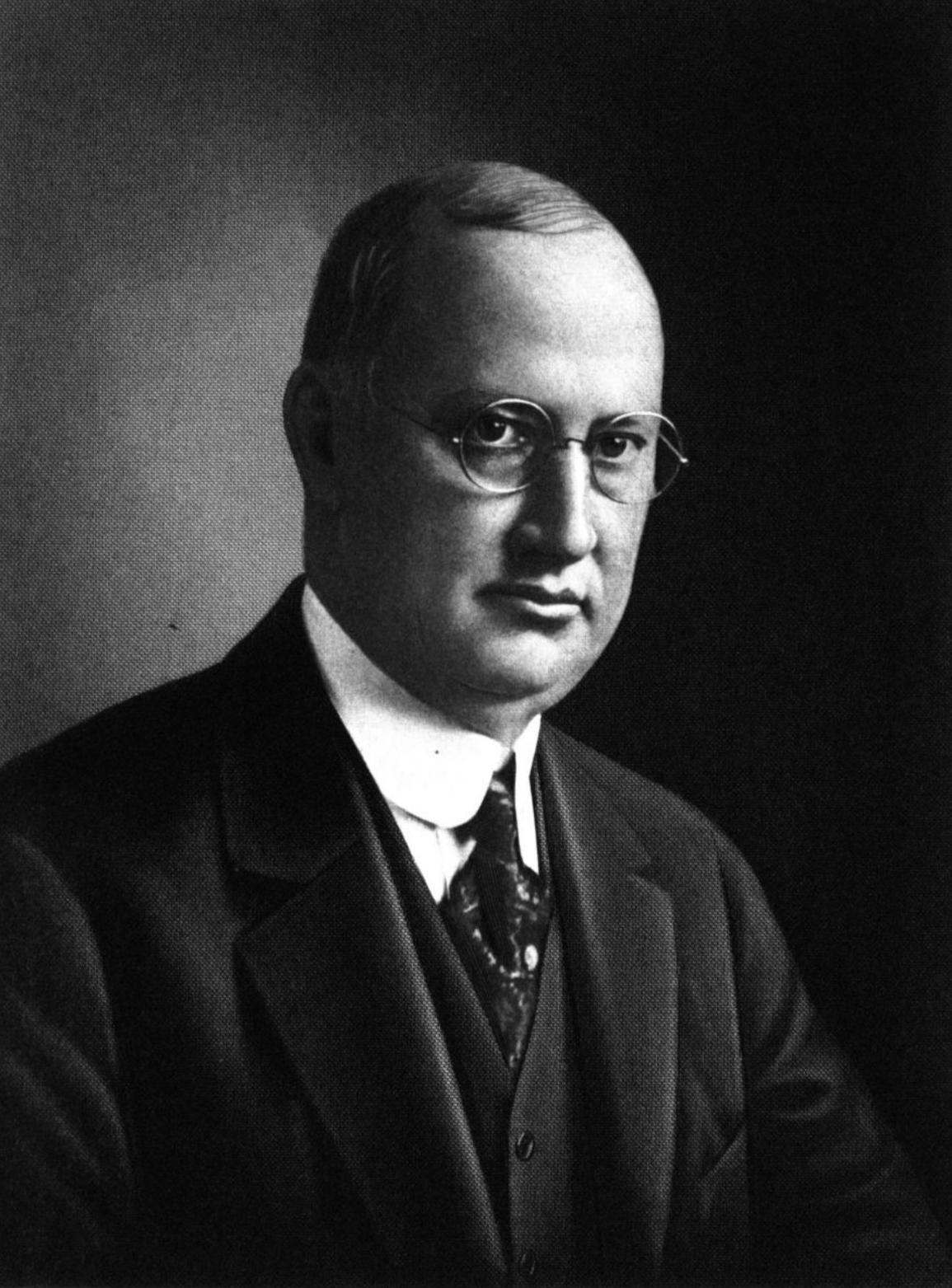
- Frederick Stanhope Peck
- Born: December 16, 1868; Providence, Rhode Island
- Died: January 20, 1947 (aged 78); Providence, Rhode Island
- Occupations: Businessman, politician, industrialist, philanthropist
- Known for: Belton Court estate
- Political party: Republican Party
- Spouse: Mary Rothwell Burlingame Peck
- Children: Helen Peck
- Parents: Leander Remington Peck (father); Sarah Gould Cannon Peck (mother)

Frederick Stanhope Peck (December 16, 1868 – January 20, 1947) was an American businessman and political figure during the early twentieth century. After growing his father's business, Peck expanded his interests and became a prominent figure within Republican politics in the state of Rhode Island. Throughout his political tenure, Peck would serve as a Republican National Committeeman, a member of the Rhode Island House of Representatives, and the State Commissioner of Finance.

Notably, Frederick Peck commissioned the Belton Court mansion which served as his private residence from 1905 to 1947; the 72,000 square-foot gothic-inspired mansion was constructed on his 800-acre estate in Barrington, Rhode Island.

== Ancestry ==
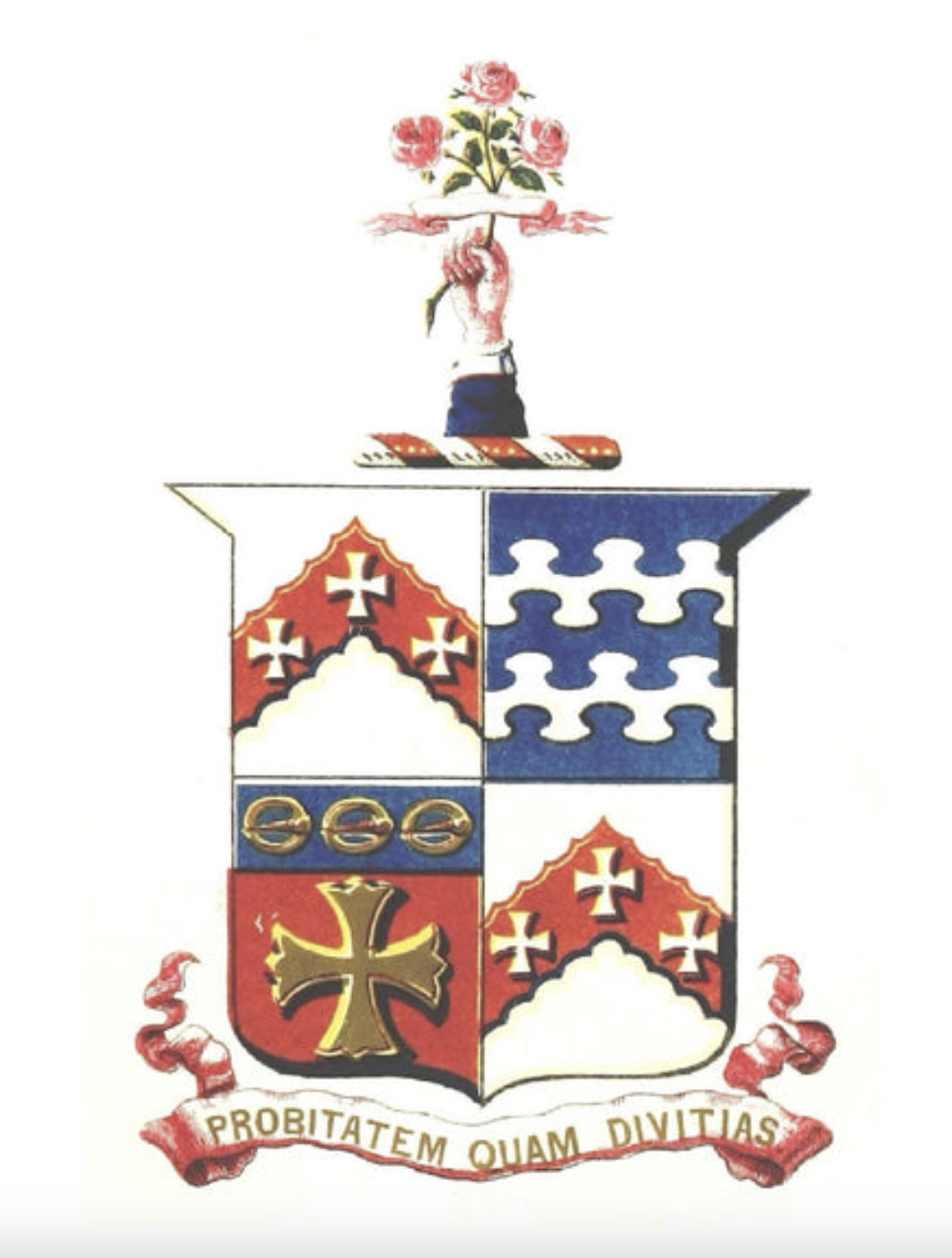
Peck Coat of Arms

The lineage of Frederick Peck traces back to Joseph Peck, his first American ancestor, who played a pivotal role in the early colonization of Hingham, Massachusetts, arriving from Hingham, England, in 1636. Joseph Peck, brother to the Reverend Robert Peck, a disaffected Puritan who fled his Hingham church in England following a crackdown by Archbishop Laud, acquired substantial land holdings situated between Narragansett Bay and the Taunton River from the Native Seacunke people (who later lent their name to Seekonk and the Seekonk River). Collaborating with notable figures such as Myles Standish and Governor William Bradford, the sale of these tracts was facilitated by the Wampanoag sachem Massasoit. In 1643, the land was officially incorporated as the town of Rehoboth.

Within the bounds of present-day Barrington, Rhode Island, Joseph Peck's son Nathaniel Peck established Ousamequin Farm. Following Joseph Peck's death in 1697, the farm passed to his son Samuel Peck. Samuel Peck would go on to serve as Deputy to the General Court at Plymouth and became the first representative from the town of Rehoboth after the union of the Plymouth Colony and the Massachusetts Bay Colony. Ousamequin Farm would continue to serve as the Peck family homestead into the early twentieth century.

== Business ventures ==
Frederick Peck's formative years were spent at public schools in Providence, Rhode Island. In 1885, Frederick S. Peck started work as an office boy at Asa Peck and Company, a woolen business founded by his grandfather in 1866; the company was incorporated in 1903 with Frederick and his father, Leander Remington Peck, as the principal stockholders. Walter Asa Peck, Frederick's uncle, had been admitted as a partner in 1880 but retired from the business upon its incorporation in 1903; this transition solidified Leander and Frederick Peck's position as the principal stockholder. Frederick's ascent within the company continued as he took on the role of treasurer; following the death of his father in 1909, Frederick assumed the position of executive director for the company.

In addition to managing his family's business, Frederick Peck also served leadership positions for the following firms:

- Lymansville Company (worsted manufacturers), president
- National Exchange Realty Company, president
- Belton Corporation, president
- Anthracite Super Fuel Company, president
- Industrial Trust Company, vice president
- Felter Company and Metal Textile Corporation, vice president
- Waldorf Lunch, Rhode Island, director
- Rhode Island Insurance Company, director
- United Electric Railway Company, director
- Coated Textile Mills, director
- Second Investors Corporation, director
- Providence Gas Company, director
- Morris Plan Company of Rhode Island, director
- Terminal Warehouse Company of Rhode Island, director
- Peck Realty Company, director
- Old Colony Co-operative Bank, director
- Industrial Safe Deposit Company, director
- Investors Trust Company, director

In addition, Frederick Peck collaborated & financially backed Harry T. Bodwell in the development of Bonnet Shores in Cranston. One of Peck's most notable undertakings involved the establishment of the Eastern Film Corporation; with offices in New York and studios in Florida, as well as a studio at the remodeled Park Brewery on Elmwood Avenue in Providence, the corporation operated from late 1914 until its destruction by fire in 1917. The Providence studio specialized in a diverse range of movies and mainly focused on commercial films; notably, Peck invested $300,000 of his own money into this business venture. The Eastern Film Corporation's most notable film was called "The Reward Of Courage" (1921) commissioned by the American Society for the Control of Cancer, now known as the American Cancer Society. This silent film is credited as being the first ever cancer awareness film created to educate the public.

== Political career ==
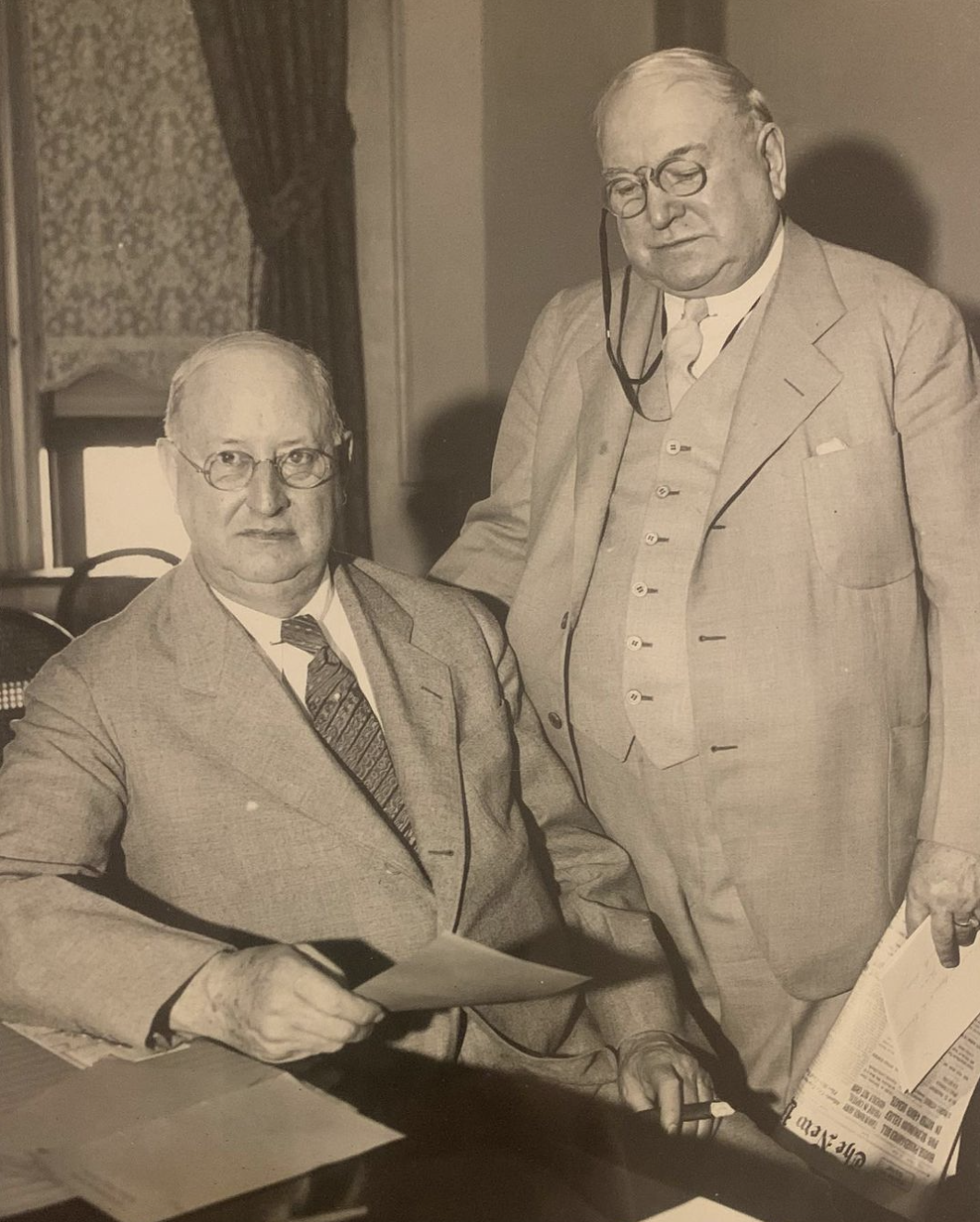
Frederick S. Peck & Lafayette Gleason discussing GOP National convention plans at the Congress Hotel, Chicago 1932

Frederick Peck's foray into politics commenced in 1909 when he secured a seat on the Barrington Town Council. Two years after his initial entry into politics, Peck ascended to the Rhode Island House of Representatives, where he served from 1911 to 1926. Peck's commitment to Republican politics was further exemplified by his appointment as Chairman of the Committee on Finance in 1915; this position allowed him to wield increased influence in shaping financial policies and decisions. Additionally, he served as a Republican National Committeeman from 1918 to 1932, contributing to the party's strategies on a national level.

Governor Aram J. Pothier appointed Frederick Peck to the position of Commissioner of Finance, a role specifically created for Peck, making him the sole individual to ever hold this position. During his initial four-year term, Peck faced with managing a state treasury burdened by a $250,000 debt against $12,900 in assets; Peck reversed the debt, transforming the state treasury into a surplus exceeding $6,000,000.00.

In 1920, Peck was involved in efforts to secure women's voting rights in Rhode Island. A contemporary newspaper account identified him as the author of an enabling act concerning women's participation in elections and described him working alongside several women who had long been active in the suffrage movement, including members of the Rhode Island Equal Suffrage Association and the Women's Republican Committee. Peck, then serving as a Republican National Committeeman, was involved with the group as the measure was developed and presented to Governor R. Livingston Beeckman. Beeckman signed the enabling act on April 22, 1920.

A Democratic victory in 1932 induced the end of Peck's political career; in 1935, the sitting Rhode Island governor Theodore Green eliminated the finance commissioner position, in turn removing Peck from Rhode Island state politics.

== Belton Court & private collections ==
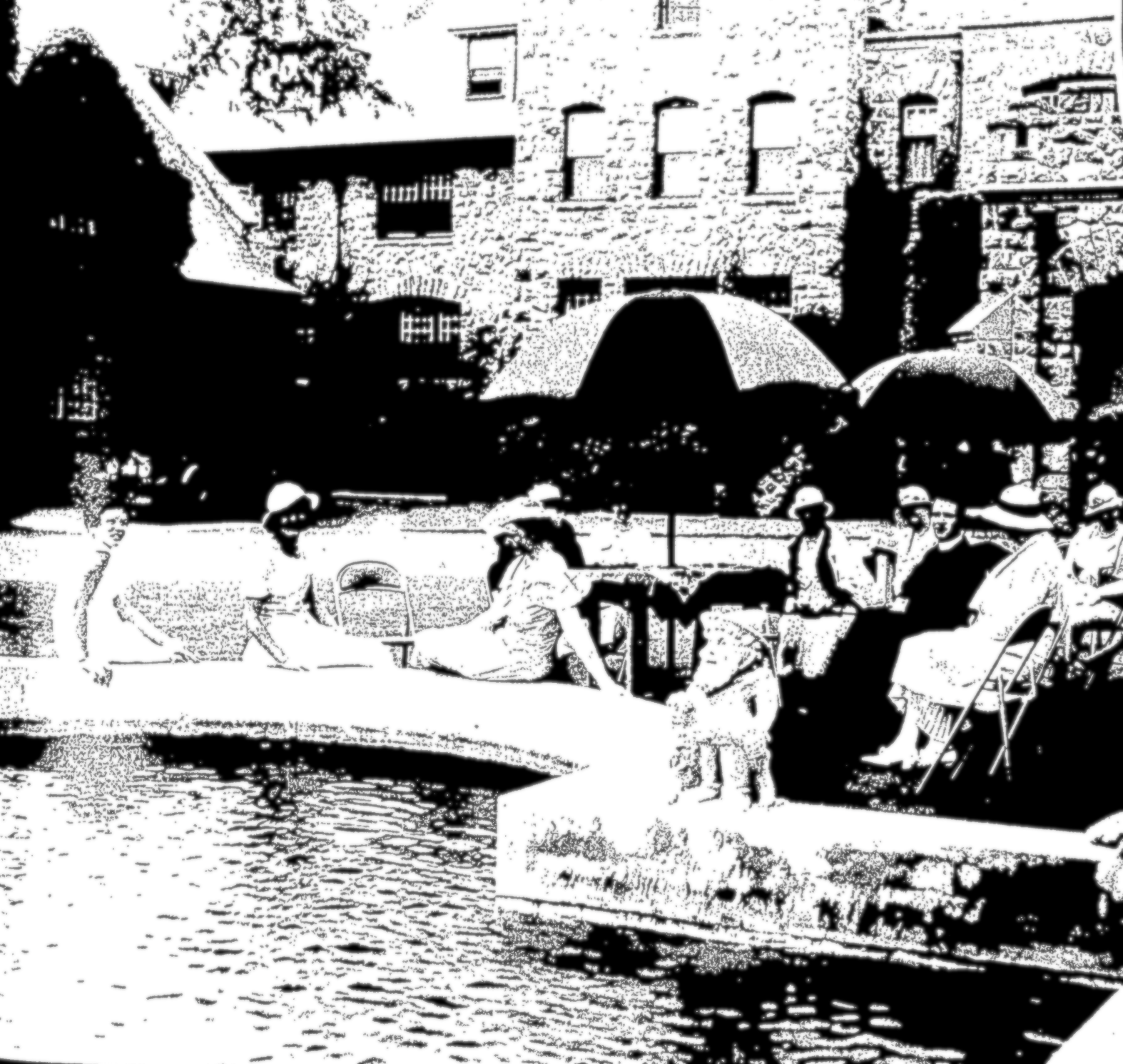
Intimate garden party at Belton Court: June 25, 1933

Before the Ousamequin Farm homestead descended to Frederick Peck on his father's death, Frederick had purchased an adjacent piece of land with the intention to erect a stone residence for which he would name Belton Court for the early home of the Pecks in England. The first wing of the building was constructed between 1905 and 1906, with its main elevation facing east onto Middle Highway. Two-and-a-half stories in height, the house was built of rough masonry granite with segmental relieving arches over the windows and doors. With Peck's expanding interests and activities, a larger residence was constructed between 1927 and 1928 north and west of the original section, forming a U-shaped court facing south; this major addition was more medieval in appearance but maintains the basic massing, height, and materials of the 1905 unit. By 1928, the home expanded to a staggering 72,000 sqft.

=== Book & signature collection ===
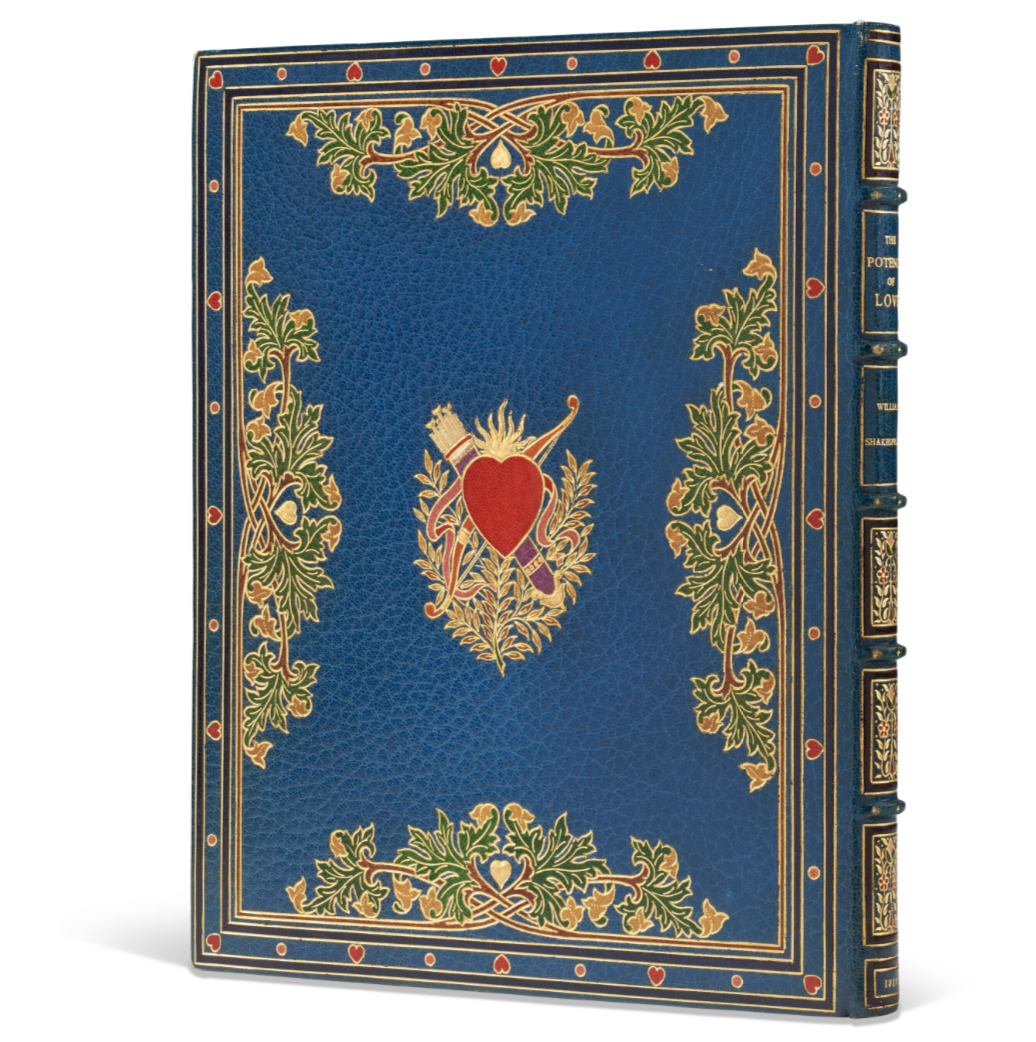
Shakespeare Poems on Love, Sangorski & Sutcliffe, circa 1919

Frederick Peck became a prominent figure in the realm of American autograph collecting and had garnered notable recognition in literary works such as "Word Shadows of the Great" by Madigan and "Autographs, a Key to Collecting" by Miss Benjamin. Peck's personal collection stands out as one of the most comprehensive assemblies of autographs from the signers of the Declaration of Independence; notably, some of these letters, such as those by Benjamin Rush and William Whipple, directly pertain to the Declaration itself. The collection also encompassed correspondence between various signers.

In addition to the array of signers' autographs, Peck's collection featured an extensive presidential section. Spanning from the earliest presidency to the early 1930s, the compilation includes letters from every U.S. President during their time in office. Beyond the signers and presidents, Frederick Peck's collection included letters from Benedict Arnold during his days as an American patriot before Quebec, letters from George Washington in his capacities as both president and commander-in-chief, and an assortment of letters and documents from various Revolutionary War Generals, including luminaries such as General John Stark and Joseph Warren. Peck's literary collection extended beyond manuscripts, encompassing first-editions books; this included the Lord Leigh set of the first four folio editions of Shakespeare, a copy of the first issue of Walt Whitman's "Leaves of Grass," and a first edition of the Rubaiyat presented in an exhibition binding by Sangorsky & Sutcliffe.

=== Artwork & artifacts ===
In addition to his manuscript and literature collection, Frederick curated a personal collection of historical artwork and artifacts. Frederick held a vast collection of Native American artifacts such as beadwork and ceremonial items, which was a notable personal interest of his. Excavated Greek and Roman artifacts such as glasswork and pottery complemented an extensive bronze Koro collection. Peck also collected vast amounts of Chinese porcelain from the Tang Dynasty to the Ming Dynasty as well as 18th and 19th century Chinese imperial clothing. Belton Court had over 10,000 square feet of the Persian rugs and hundreds of lustreware.

Frederick collected paintings ranging from the 15th century to the early 20th century which were hung in the limestone and marble gallery corridors of Belton Court that connect the 1905-06 built section to the 1927-28 built section. Many other notable paintings were hung in the ballroom, reception hall, and foyer.

== Later years & death ==
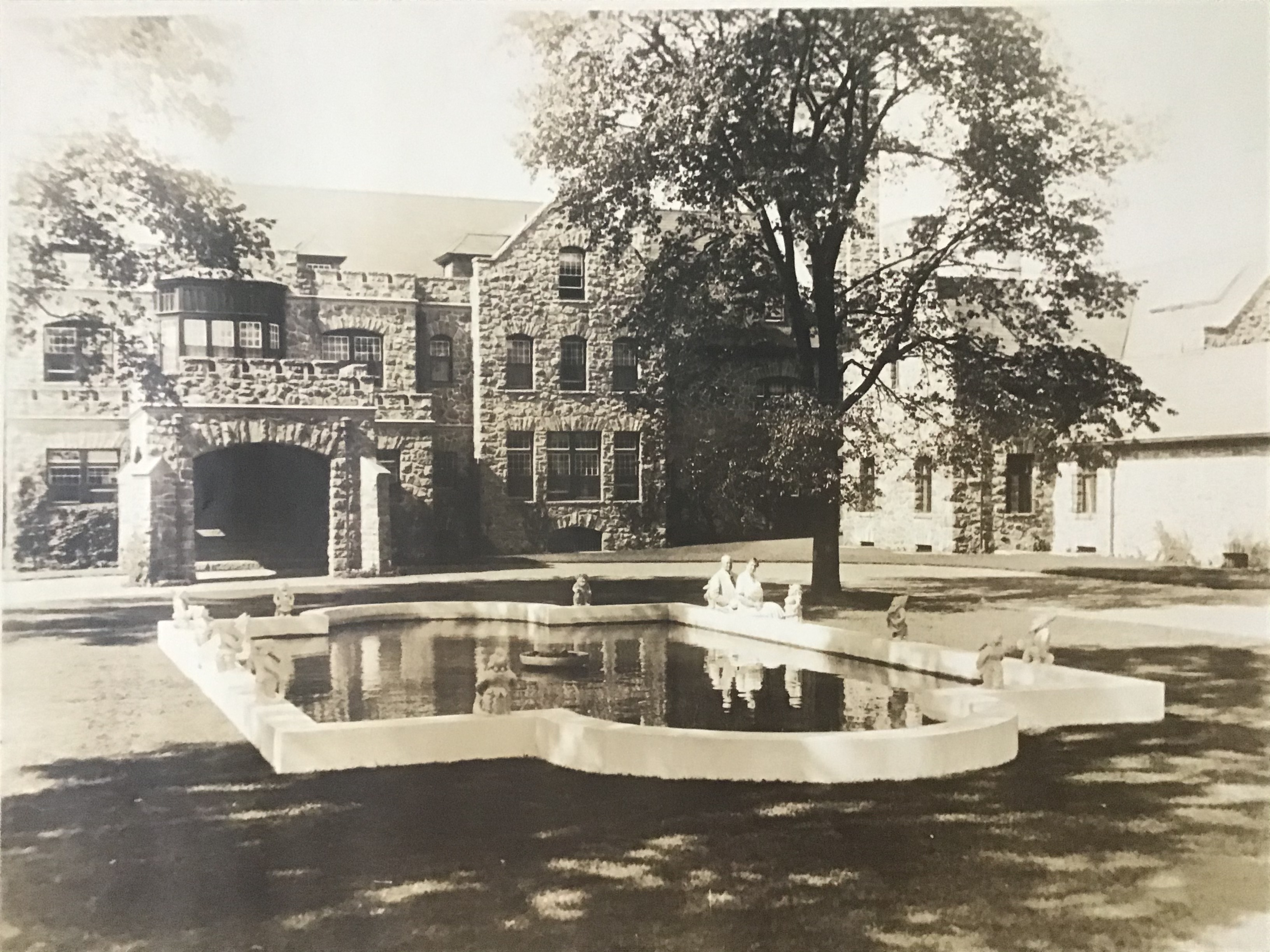
Frederick & Mary Peck seated on the reflecting pool wall circa 1930

Following his departure from the political arena, Frederick Peck redirected his focus towards the meticulous curation of books, art, antiques, and the cultivation of orchids. The early 1940s marked a decline in Peck's health, attributed to a series of strokes. In 1944, confronted with the realities of his health, Peck auctioned half his book collection; this took place at the Parke Bernet Galleries in New York City, a precursor to Sotheby's auction house. Frederick Peck would die at the Providence Homeopathic Hospital on January 20, 1947, with his wife, Mary, and daughter, Helen, by his bedside.

The funeral took place within the ballroom of Belton Court and attendance exceeded 500 individuals. Attendees congregated in the mansion's ballroom, reception hall, and reception room; to ensure comprehensive participation, strategically positioned speakers transmitted the service throughout the entire residence. Dignitaries from diverse political roles, including United States Senate members and state governors, were in attendance; in a gesture of respect, flags on public buildings in Barrington and select state establishments were lowered to half staff. The Barrington town hall closed at noon, affording town officials the opportunity to attend the service at Belton Court; additionally, the Leander R. Peck School observed closure at noon as a mark of homage. Frederick Peck was buried at Princes Hill Cemetery, alongside his parents.

=== Legacy ===
In present day Rehoboth, Peck's Corner is named for the early Peck family. The Leander R. Peck school (now the Barrington Public Library) is still extant. Peck Street in Providence is named for Frederick Peck.

Following Frederick Peck's death, Belton Court changed hands and underwent subsequent transformations during the remainder of the twentieth century; it became the property of Barrington College and later the Zion Bible Institute. In 2011, the mansion was put up for auction and is currently in a state of abandonment.

== See also ==
- Belton Court
