= Belton Court =

Historic house in Rhode Island, United States

Coordinates: 41°45′43.19″N 71°19′59.98″W

- U.S. National Register of Historic Places
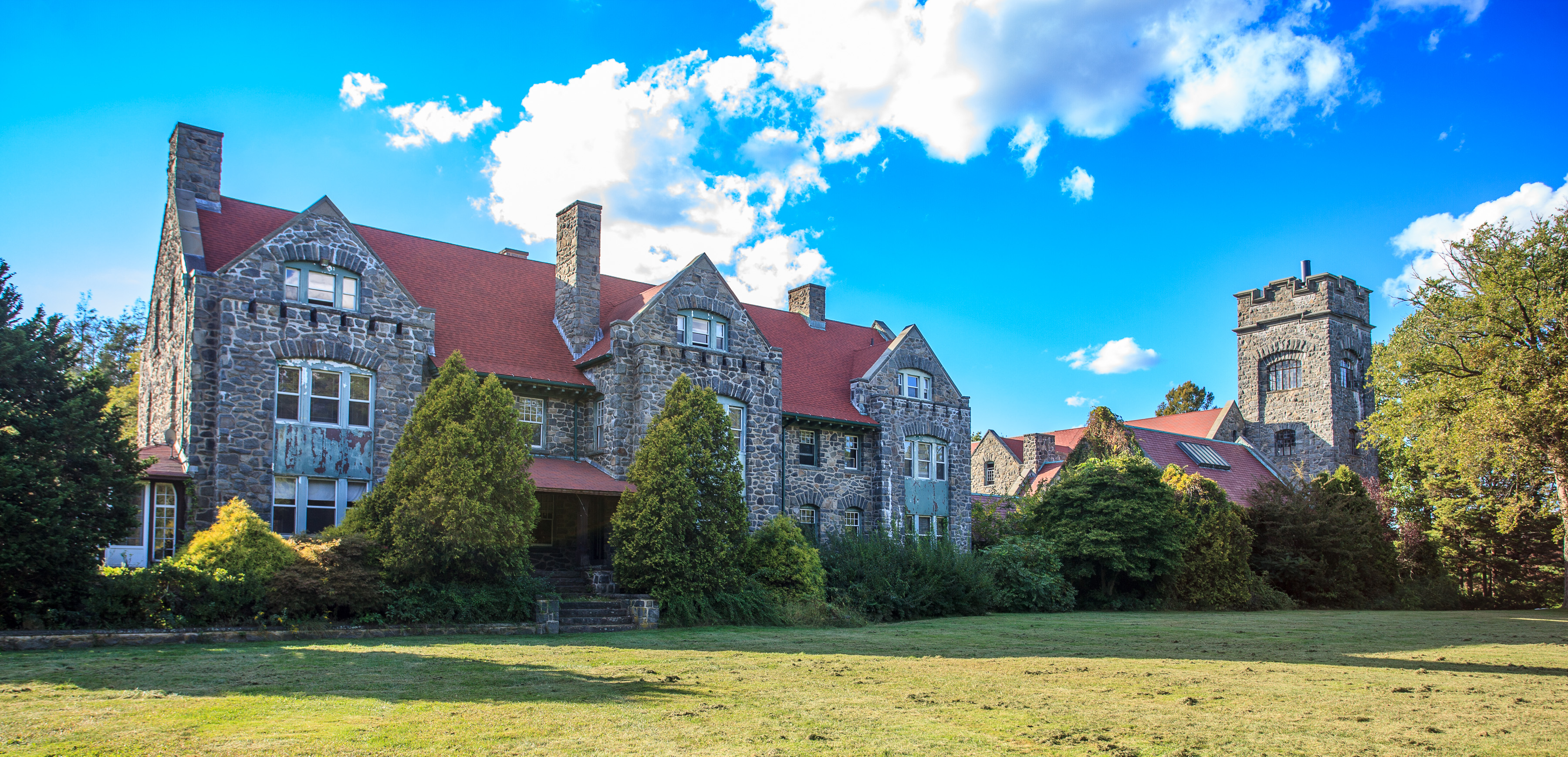
- Belton Court in 2012

- Location within Rhode Island
- Location: Barrington, Rhode Island, United States
- Built: 1905
- Architect: Martin & Hall; George Frederic Hall
- Architectural style: Medieval inspired
- NRHP reference No.: 76000037
- Added to NRHP: June 30, 1976

Belton Court (also known as Ferrin Hall, Barrington College, Gibson Memorial Building, and Peck Mansion) is a historic estate on Middle Highway in Barrington, Rhode Island. The mansion was built for Frederick Stanhope Peck, a businessman, socialite, and Rhode Island political figure. Later in the twentieth century, the mansion and surrounding property served as the campus for Barrington College and the Zion Bible Institute. At its peak, Belton Court served as the mansion for the 800-acre Peck estate. Encompassing 72,000 sqft, the mansion was constructed over the course of 2.5 years from 1905-1906 & 1927-1928. The initial 1905 segment (the current eastern wing) was designed by Martin & Hall, an esteemed Providence architectural firm. The expansive 1927–1928 north and west additions were designed by George Frederic Hall, that firm's successor.

Notably, the entire mansion was constructed using granite quarried directly from the Peck estate itself, a testament to both the scale of the property and the resources invested in its creation.

The building was added to the National Register of Historic Places in 1976. Since 2011, Belton Court and the surrounding structures have been predominantly vacant.

== History ==
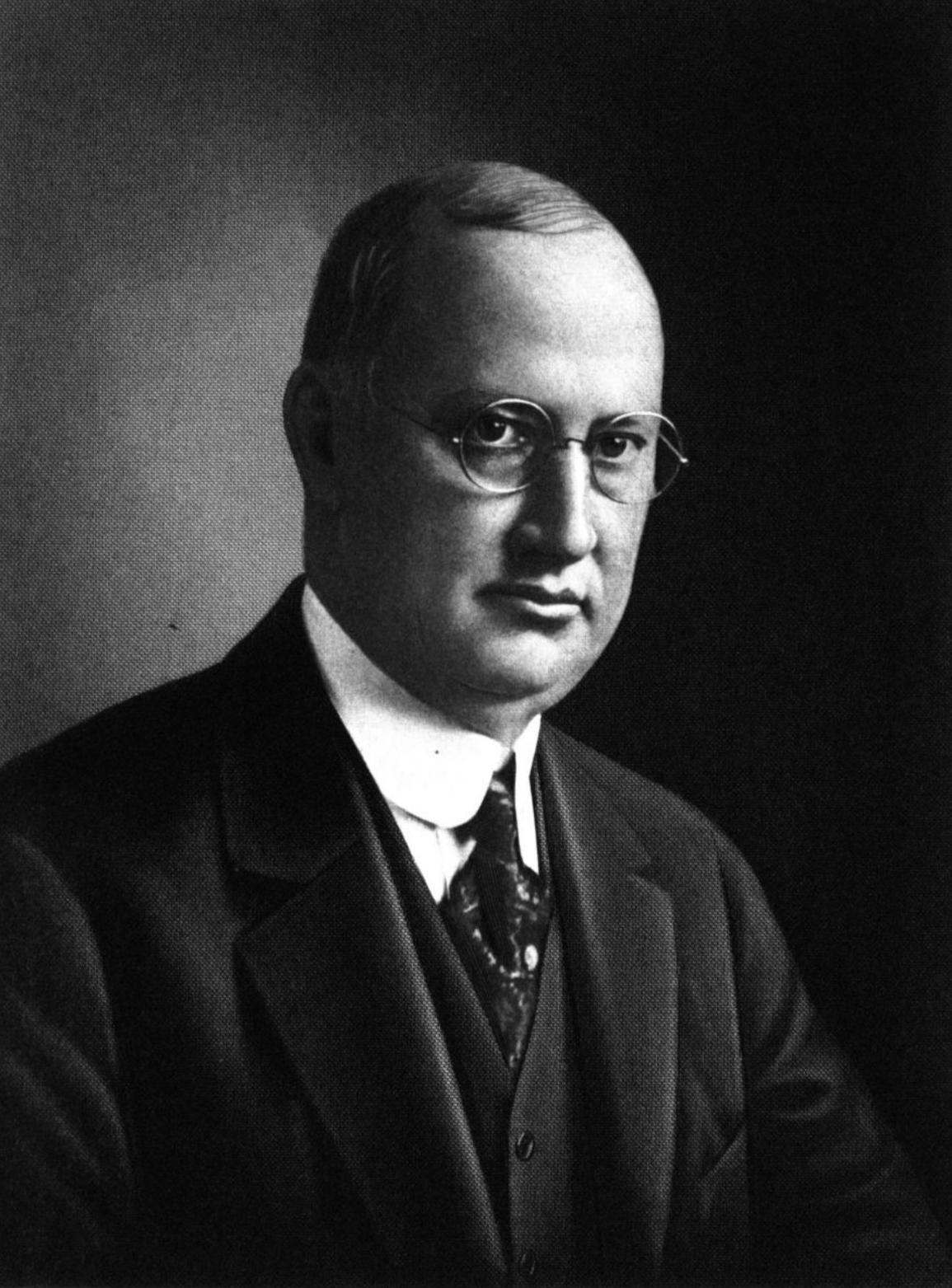
Frederick Stanhope Peck

Frederick Peck's first American ancestor was Joseph Peck who immigrated to Hingham, Massachusetts in 1636. With captain Myles Standish, Governor William Bradford and others, Joseph Peck purchased a tract of land located between Narragansett Bay and the Taunton River in 1641 from Massasoit (or Ousamequin Sachem). Nathaniel Peck, Joseph's son, settled on part of this land in Barrington which he called Ousamequin Farm. This property remained in the family homestead into the twentieth century. Before Ousamequin Farm descended to Frederick Peck on his father's death, he purchased an adjacent piece of land with the intention to erect a stone residence for which he would name Belton Court for the early home of the Pecks in England.

=== Architecture ===
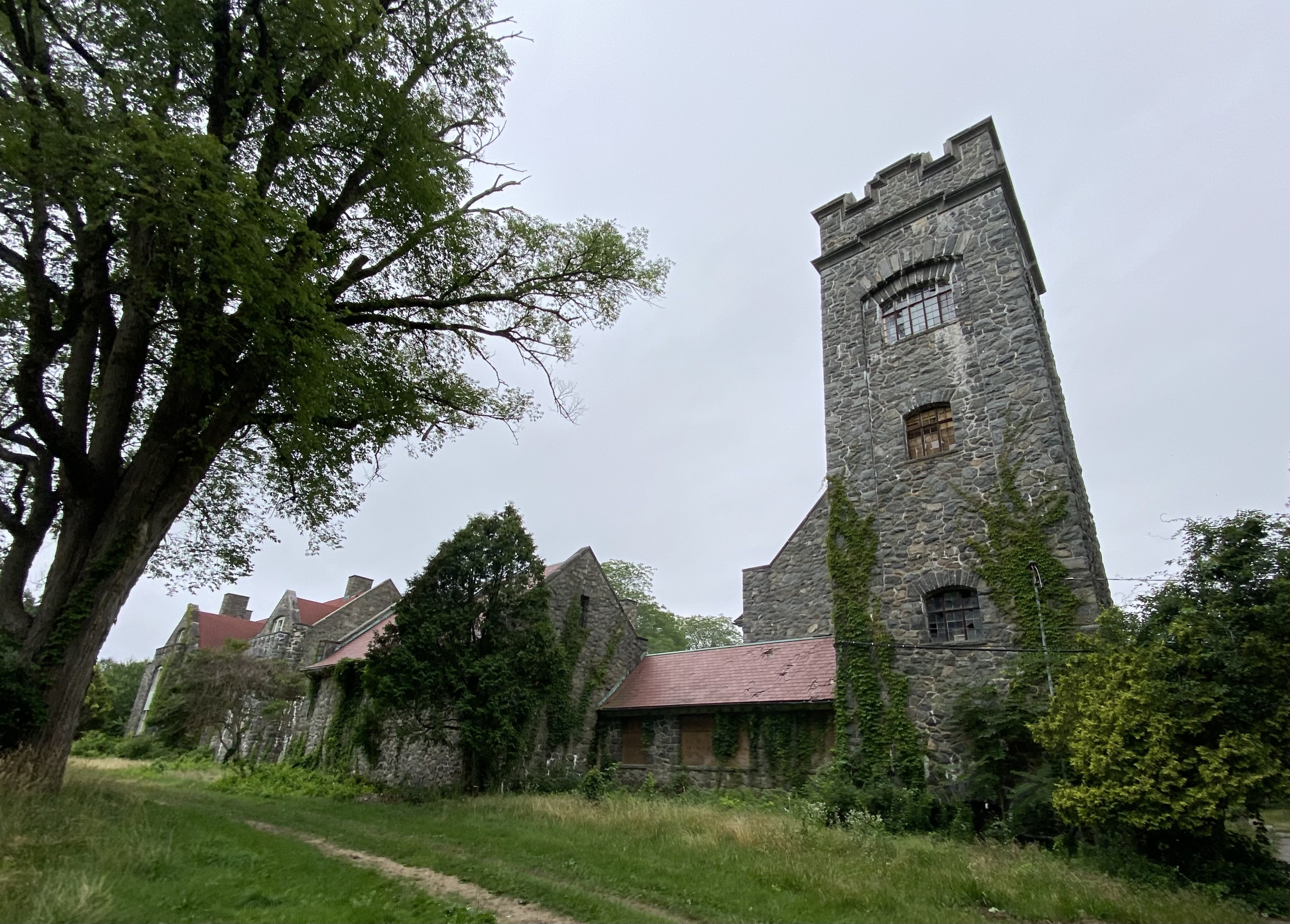
Eastern side view of the 1928-built crenellated tower in 2021

The first wing of the building was put up between 1905 and 1906, with its main elevation facing east onto Middle Highway. Two-and-a-half stories in height, the house was built of rough masonry granite with segmental relieving arches over the windows and doors. With Peck's expanding interests and activities, a larger residence was constructed between 1927 and 1928 north and west of the original section, forming a U-shaped court facing south; this major addition was more medieval in appearance but maintains the basic massing, height, and materials of the 1905 unit. At the northeast corner, a four-story, crenellated tower, formerly containing a water tank, dominates the complex to this day. As of 2022, the tower currently houses an AT&T transmitter that is powered by an external cable.

=== Art and collections ===
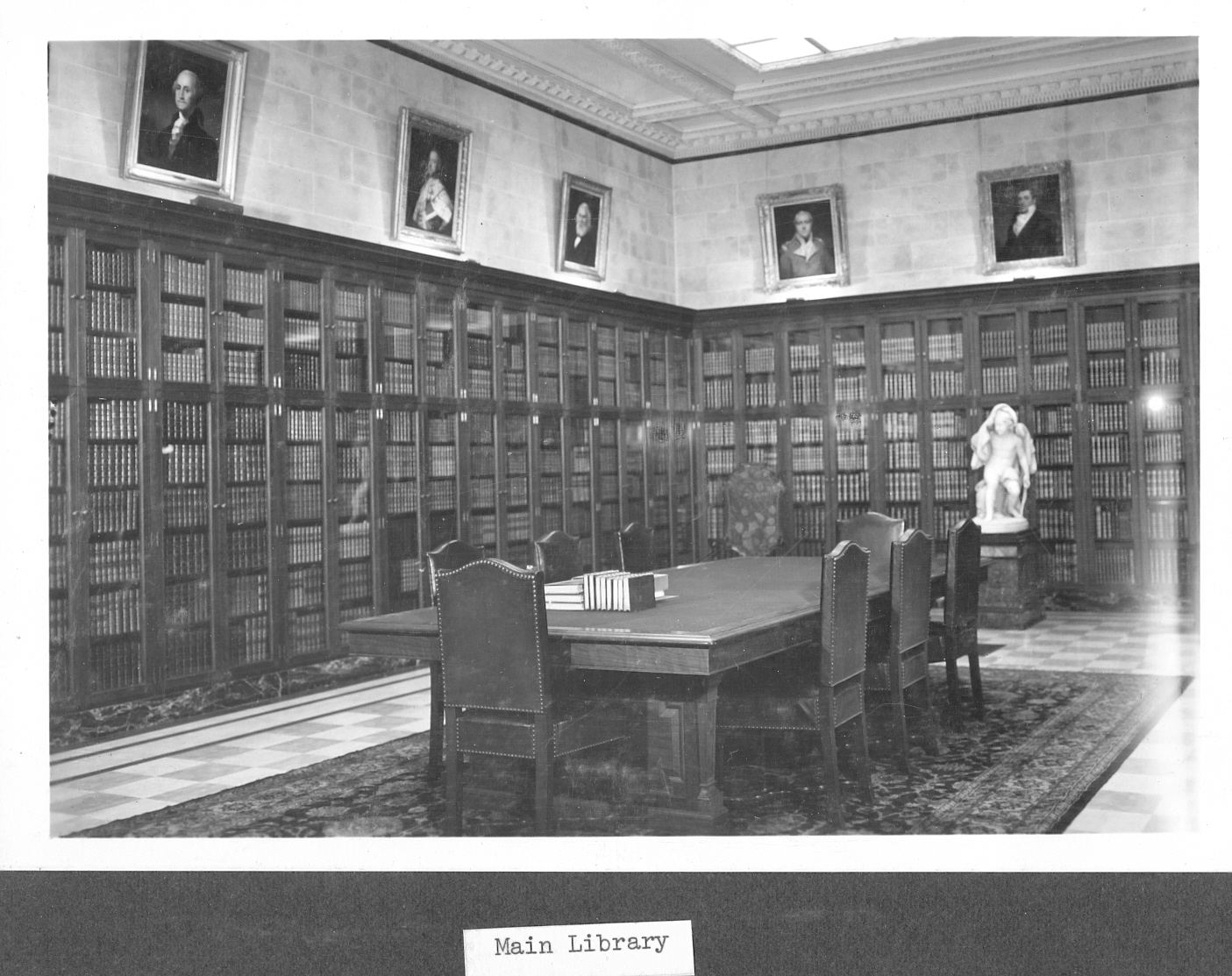
Belton Court's Black Walnut Library circa 1929-30

Belton Court was as much of a museum as it was a private residence. Peck devoted as much energy to his avocation of book and manuscript collecting as to his business and political career; he was deeply interested in New England history. When sold at auction in 1944, his book collection numbered 8,000 volumes, expensively bound and in excellent condition. Representative high points were the first four folios of Shakespeare's plays and a first edition of Shakespeare's sonnets.

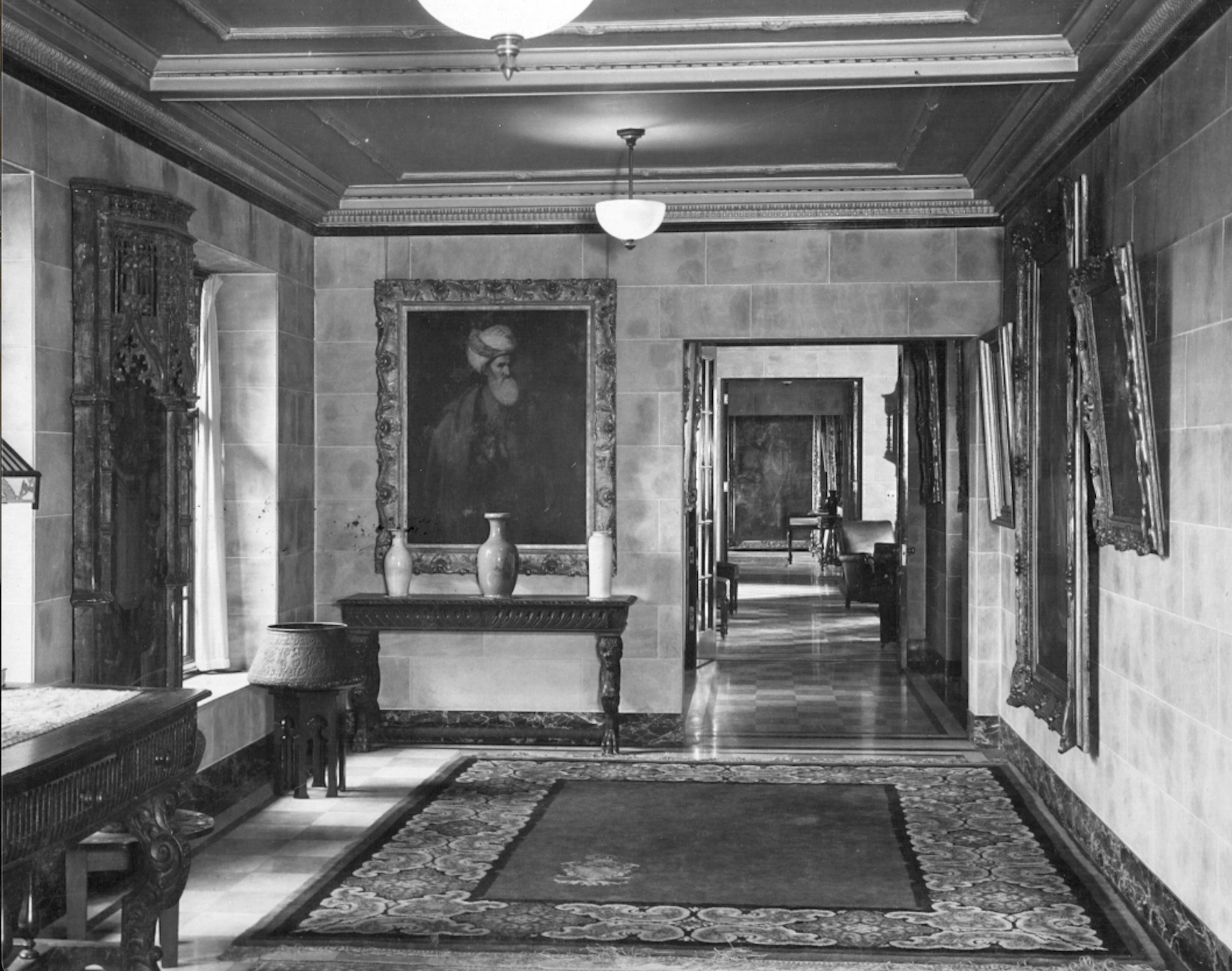
Belton Courts Limestone Gallery looking towards Library & 1905-06 section

Peck's manuscript library was one of the finest private collections in the country at the time, it included multiple sets of signers of the Declaration of Independence, two complete sets of letters signed by presidents while in office, and a more unusual collection of letters by the wives of multiple presidents. His collection also notably included a collection of the letters and papers of George Washington and documents relating to Rhode Island, including letters of Roger Williams and an undated order from President Tyler to authorize the use of federal troops in the Dorr Rebellion. Other areas of collecting interest included Roman and Phoenician glass, Native American artifacts, and eighteenth-century English portraiture.

The following list is of notable artists whose original and attributed artwork once hung within the halls of Belton Court; a majority of these paintings were hung in the limestone and marble gallery corridors connecting the 1905-06 section to the 1927-28 section while other paintings were hung in the ballroom, reception hall, and foyer:

- Sir William Beechey
- Sir Thomas Lawrence
- Sir Henry Raeburn R.A.
- William Hoare R.A.
- Thomas Gainsborough R.A.
- John Hoppner R.A.
- Gilbert Stuart
- Sir Martin Archer Shee P.R.A
- Sir Joshua Reynolds
- Johannes Lingelbach
- Sir Godfrey Kneller R.A.
- Sir Anthony Van dyck (Attributed)
- Jacques Louis David
- Ozias Humphry R.A.
- Sarkis Diranian
- George Romney R.A.
- Francis Cotes R.A.
- Giovanni Paolo Panini
- John Francis Rigaud R.A.
- James Northcote
- George Henry Harlow
- Francois Boucher
- Alberto Passini
- Frank Duveneck N.A.

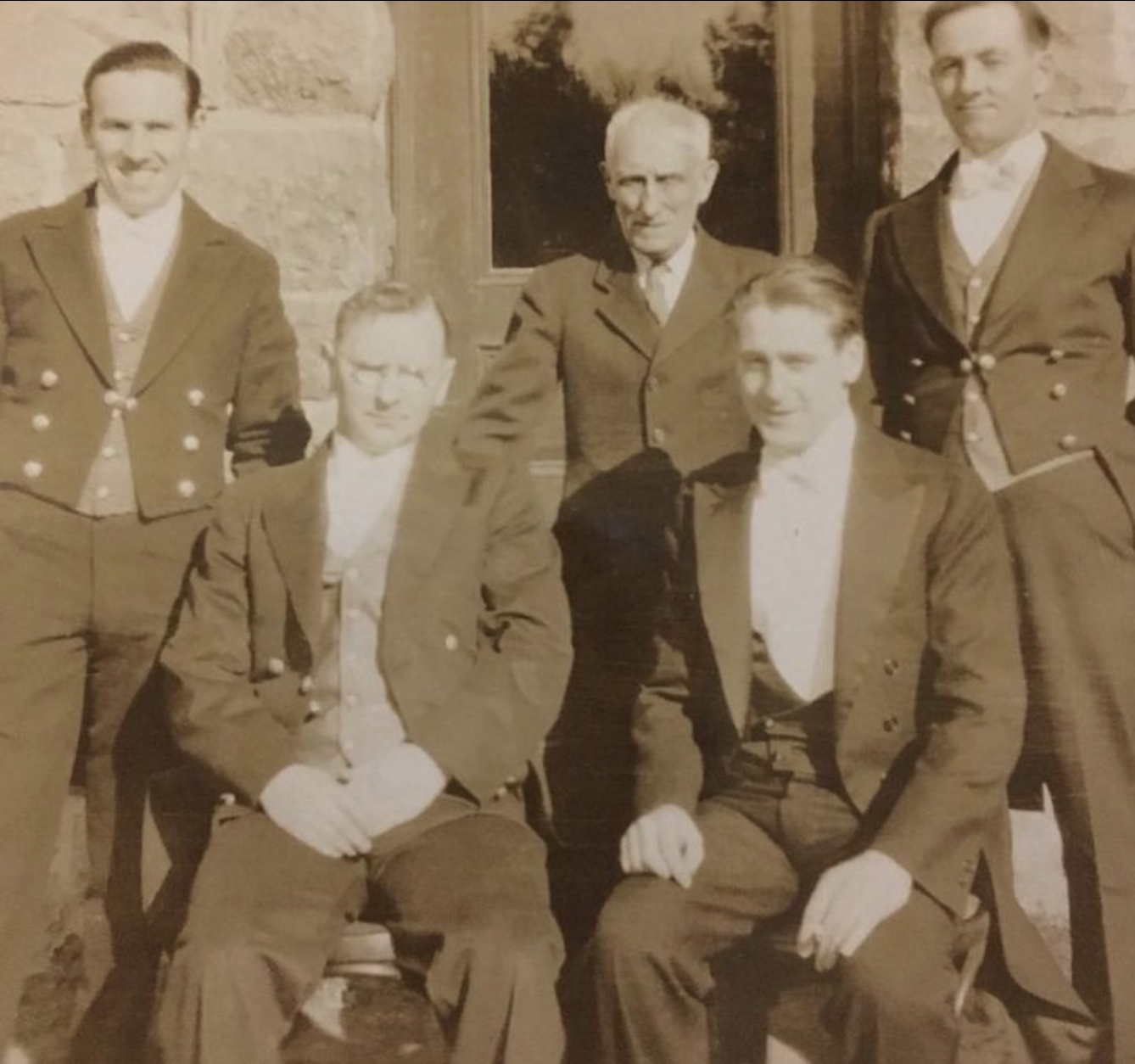
Footmen posing for photo outside service area of Belton Court

=== Grounds and staffing ===
The 800-acre estate of Belton Court featured several other structures that serviced daily life at the mansion. A fully functioning farm was located on-site, complete with cows, oxen, horses, and pigs. Not much is known about the farming aspect towards the end of the estates life; however, a large 20,000 square-foot stable complex was formerly located at the end of Primrose Road near the bank of the Hundred Acre Cove. Belton Court's greenhouse complex consisted of a central 130-foot greenhouse with three 70-foot greenhouses branching off, dedicated to orchids, chrysanthemums, and succulents. The outdoor flower beds from the cutting garden had rows of roses and gladiolus.

Over the years Frederick Peck had two superintendents to manage the estate, including one by the name of John S. Doig. Frederick employed 64 Full time Staff to maintain the grounds and home, some lived in house & others lived in a selection of 11 homes peppered throughout the property. A mechanic by the name of Axel Paulson was one of Belton Court's full time mechanics that serviced farming equipment and Frederick Peck's automobiles.

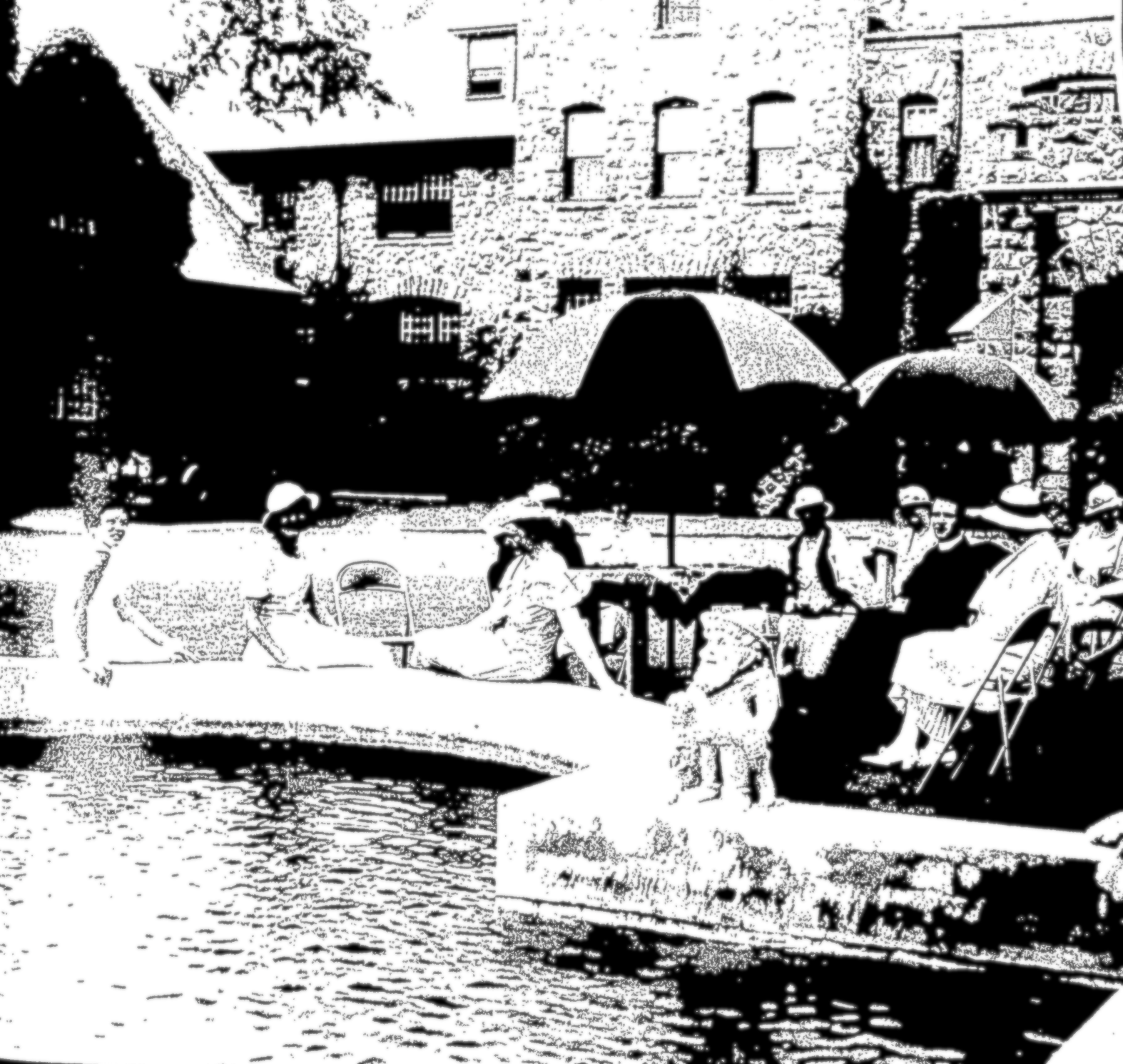
Intimate garden party at Belton Court, 1933

=== Life at Belton Court ===
Firsthand accounts from former staff recall that two to three lavish political parties were held at the mansion every week. Large and small intimate gatherings were hosted regularly at Belton Court from its construction in 1905–06 through the early 1940s. Even during Prohibition, the estate’s two wine cellars were reportedly always stocked with spirits and fine wines. The formal dining room table could be set for thirty guests, and formal china and silver services were custom-made bearing the Peck family crest—a cubit arm grasping three roses.

Notable guests included Charles Curtis (Vice President of the United States), Corinne Roosevelt Robinson (sister of Theodore Roosevelt), Ogden L. Mills (Secretary of the Treasury), Robert Livingston Beeckman (Governor of Rhode Island and close acquaintance of the Peck family), Mrs. Edward E. Gann (sister of Vice President Charles Curtis), William Henry Vanderbilt III (Governor of Rhode Island), Aram J. Pothier (Governor of Rhode Island), Henry F. Lippitt (Governor of Rhode Island), and Nicholas Longworth (38th Speaker of the United States House of Representatives).

Most notably, it is rumored that President Calvin Coolidge—and possibly President Herbert Hoover—stayed at Belton Court in the late 1920s.

== Institutional use ==
In 1944, Frederick Peck arranged to leave Belton Court to the Providence Homeopathic Hospital (now known as the Roger Williams Medical Center), of which he served as president for many years. Peck would die in Providence on January 20, 1947. The Belton Court property had been given to the Providence Homeopathic Hospital in 1944; however, the structures was considered unusable for hospital purposes and was sold to a developer. During the mid to late twentieth century, large portions of the former estate grounds that surrounded Belton Court were sold off for the development of single-family housing. The mansion complex was first used by the Edgewood School and then acquired by the Providence Bible Institute in 1950.

=== Barrington College ===
The Providence Bible Institute operated both Providence and Barrington campuses during the 1950s. In 1960, the Providence campus was sold and integrated with the Barrington campus to form Barrington College. Student housing and academic buildings were constructed on the surrounding property; the mansion was used for administrative offices and the library. Due to financial and enrollment issues, Barrington College merged with Gordon College of Wenham, Massachusetts; the campus was subsequently put up for sale in 1985.

=== Zion Bible Institute ===
The Zion Bible Institute, a Pentecostal ministry college, bought the campus for $5 million in 1985. The Zion Bible Institute would occupy the campus until moving to Bradford, Massachusetts in 2008; Zion would be the last tenant to occupy Belton Court. In 2007, the former campus was listed for sale at $13 million.

== Abandonment and future uncertainty ==
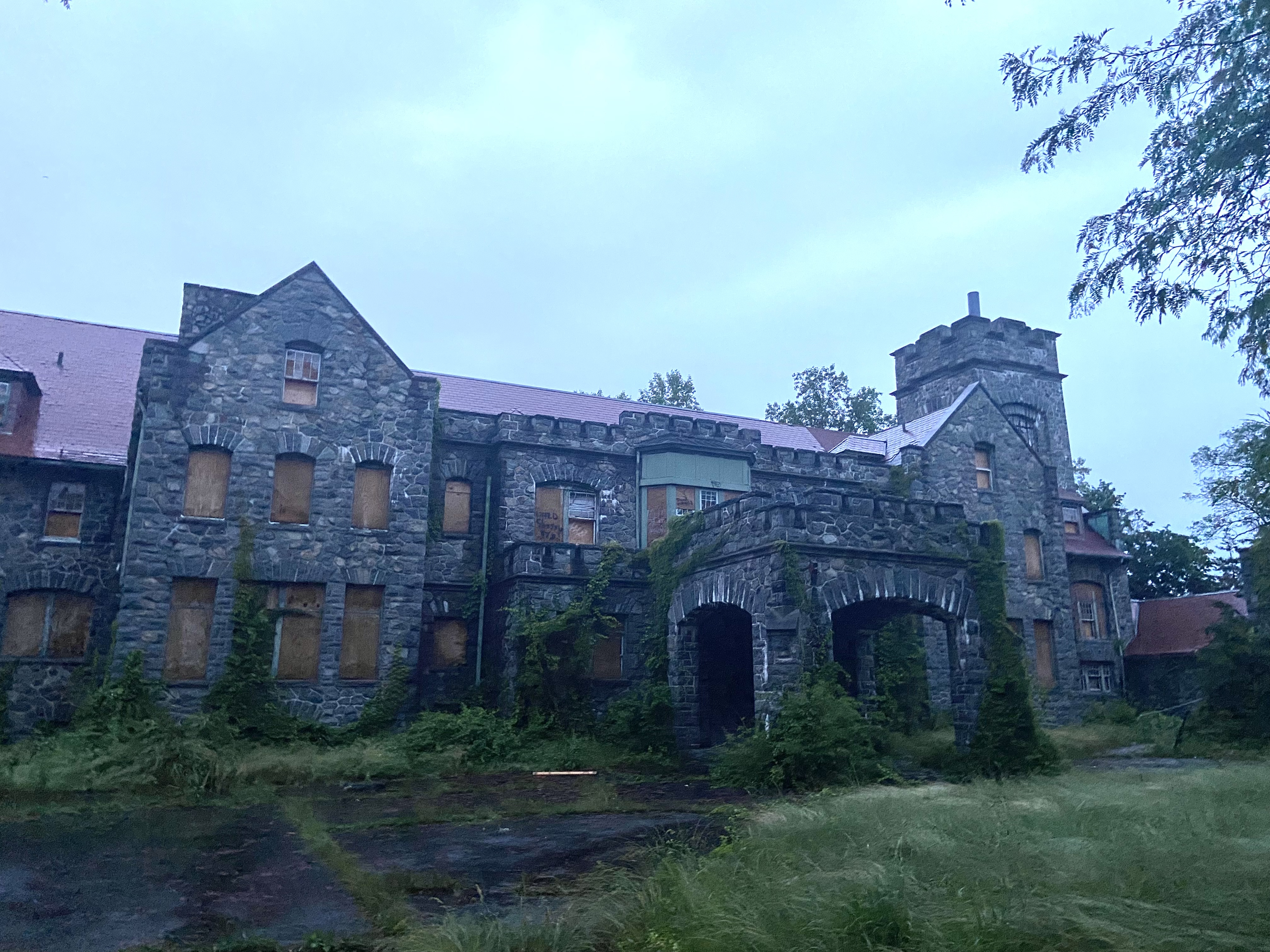
Entrance view of the 1928-built north addition in 2021; notice the overgrowth and boarded windows

In 2011 a Massachusetts-based investor, ShineHarmony Holdings LLC, won a bid for Belton Court at auction for about $3.5 million and proposed to preserve the property as adaptive reuse for elderly housing, assisted living, skilled nursing, and memory care. Despite this, development on the project was never initialized, with ShineHarmony officially abandoning the plan in 2017 and listing the property for sale. During this time, Belton Court and the campus structures had since been vacated.

Amenities were cut off to the mansion and campus structures; vandalism and neglect further damaged the buildings. With no active development on the site, many locals viewed the former campus site as a safety hazard, while preservationists called for the town of Barrington to hold the property owners accountable for the mansion's dilapidation. In 2020, many town officials expressed interest in rezoning the property for academic purposes or corporate offices.

In the Spring of 2021, demolition of a porch attached to the 1905 section took place alongside the demolition of several heavily deteriorated campus structures. ShineHarmony reinstated their development plan for the property, albeit highly altered from the initial 2011 plan. In 2022, it was estimated that restoring Belton Court would cost over $10 million. The 2021 master plan approval for the Belton Court property expired in July 2022.

In September 2022, ShineHarmony indicated plans to pursue the demolition of Belton Court; many town officials and locals expressed major concern for the future preservation of the mansion. While Belton Court is a listed structure, it does not have protections against demolition by private owners; it does not reside in a historic district. In accordance with permit filings, ShineHarmony had intended to commence demolition by late September or early October. In early October, town officials announced that the mansion would not be demolished; rather, extensive stakeholder engagement and negotiations with the owners would occur over the coming months in regard to the mansion's future preservation.

In January 2023, ShineHarmony released an updated plan that called for a large scale residential development be constructed on the 36.9-acre parcel. The plan calls for the demolition of 85% of the mansion and the construction of over 350 housing units on the property. The development- referred to as “Belton Court Village"- would also contain pocket parks, civic buildings, and small commercial spaces. The plan received overwhelming backlash from Barrington residents and town officials; preservation advocates blasted the plan for its proposed demolition of Belton Court.

In March 2023, the town of Barrington unanimously approved a proposition to sell town property at the former Carmelite Monastery and use the proceeds to offset the acquisition of the former Barrington College property. As proposed, the grounds surrounding Belton Court would be converted into new athletic fields and a recreation center; however, this would not be pursued.

On January 19, 2024, Belton Court has been abated and is being prepared for demolition; demolition would commence once the proper permits are approved by the town of Barrington. On March 5, 2024, Shine Harmony Holdings presented a revised master plan that reiterated prior proposals; this plan was once again criticized by town officials and residents. Approval of a master plan is a requisite before any demolition can take place.

As of May 5, 2025, Belton Court remains standing, and no new demolition permit has been filed. However, the most recent proposal, when submitted, would seek approval to demolish approximately 85% percent of the mansion’s most architecturally significant sections, effectively reducing the historic estate to a minor service wing and a tower intended for cellular antenna use.

== Gallery ==
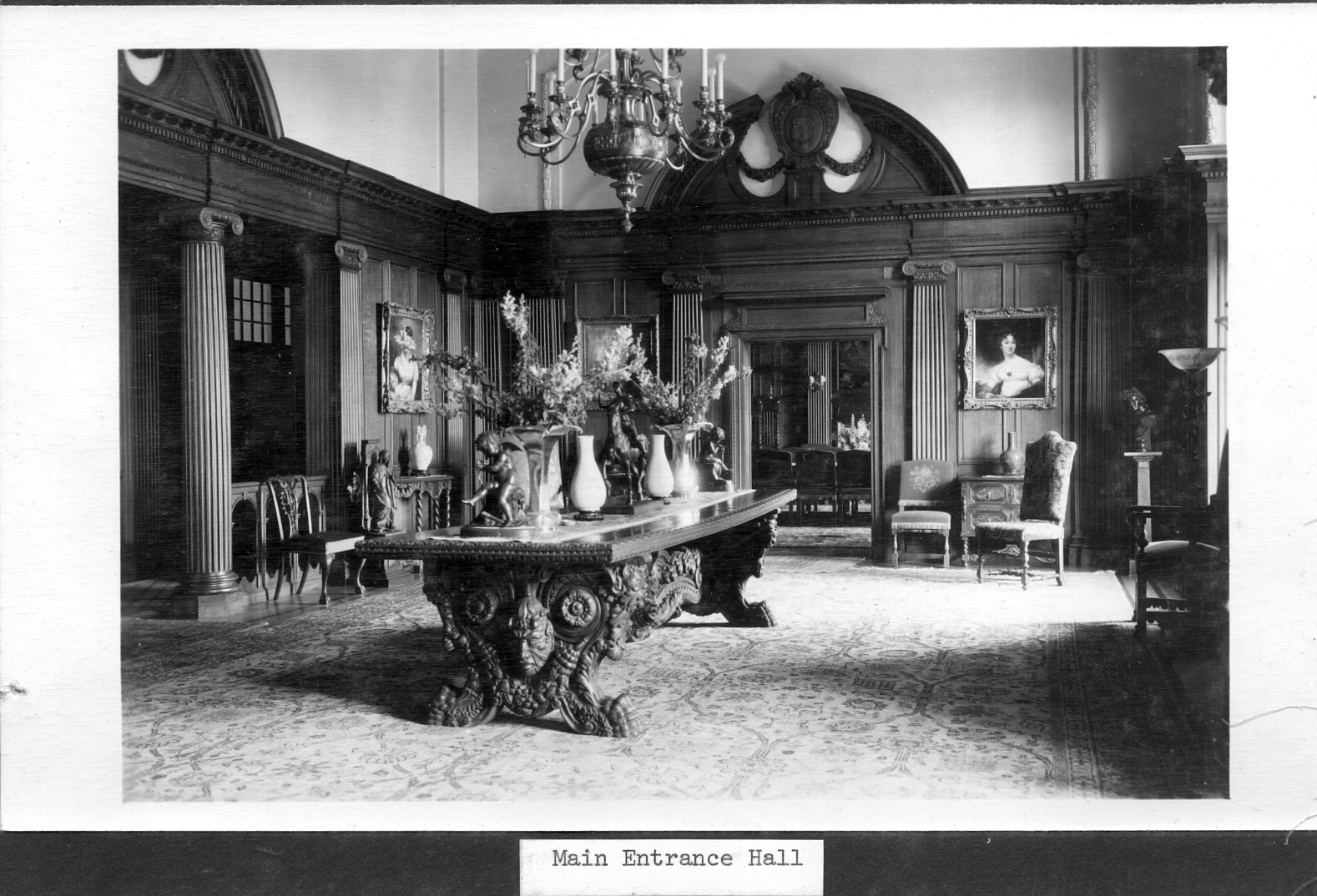
Oak Reception Hall circa 1929–30

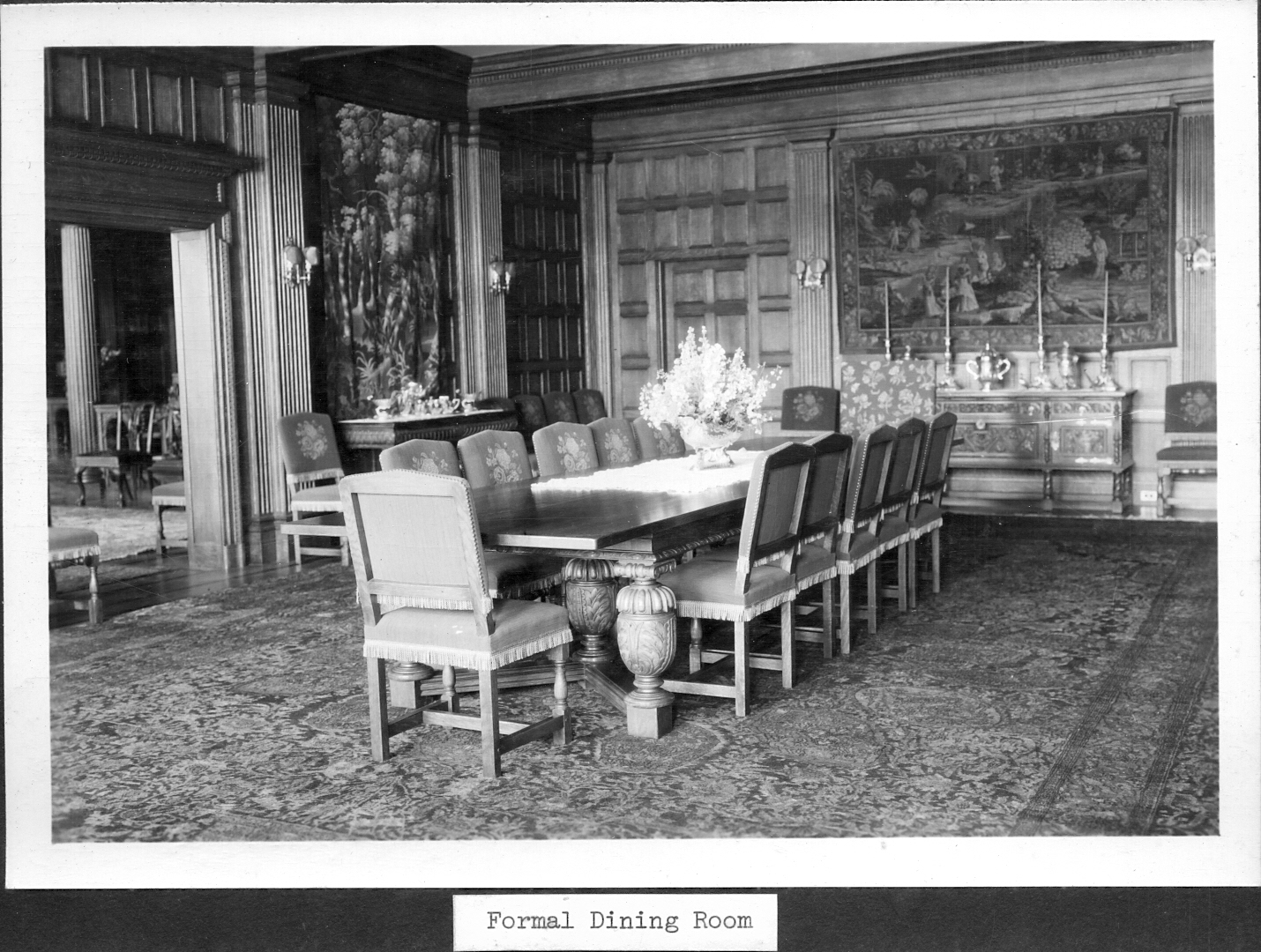
Formal Dining Room 1927-28 Section

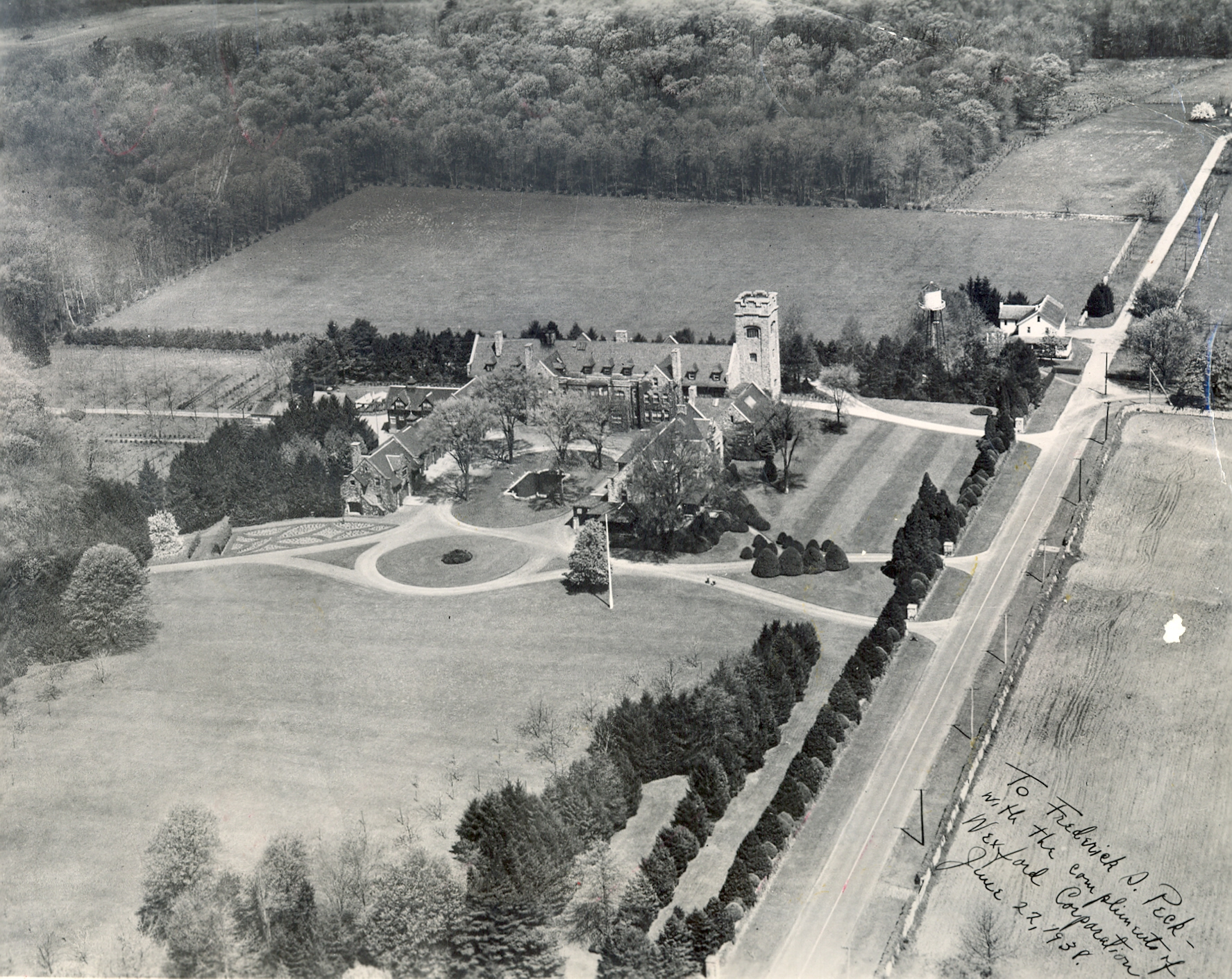
Aerial view of Belton Court circa 1938

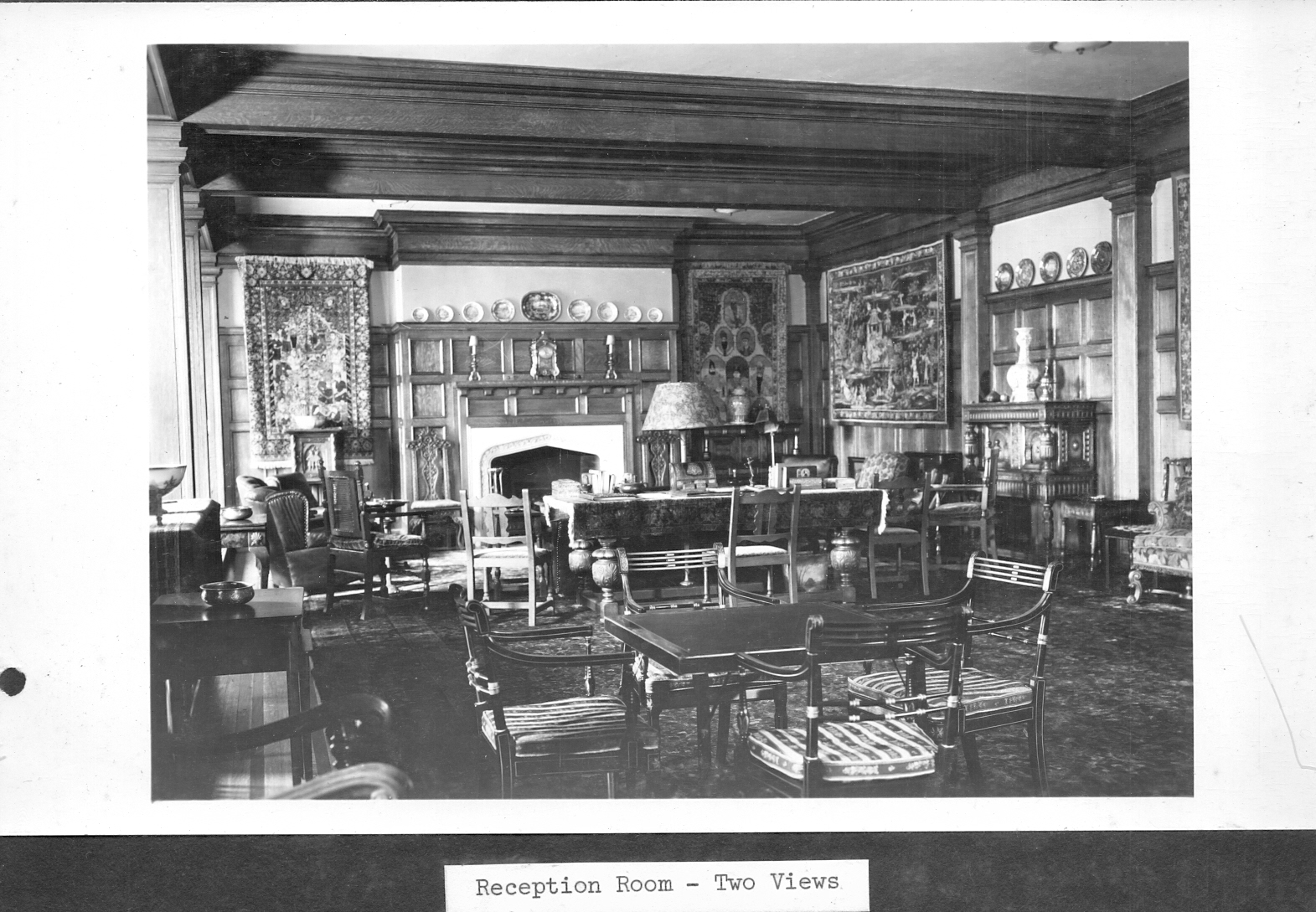
Belton Court Reception Room circa 1930s

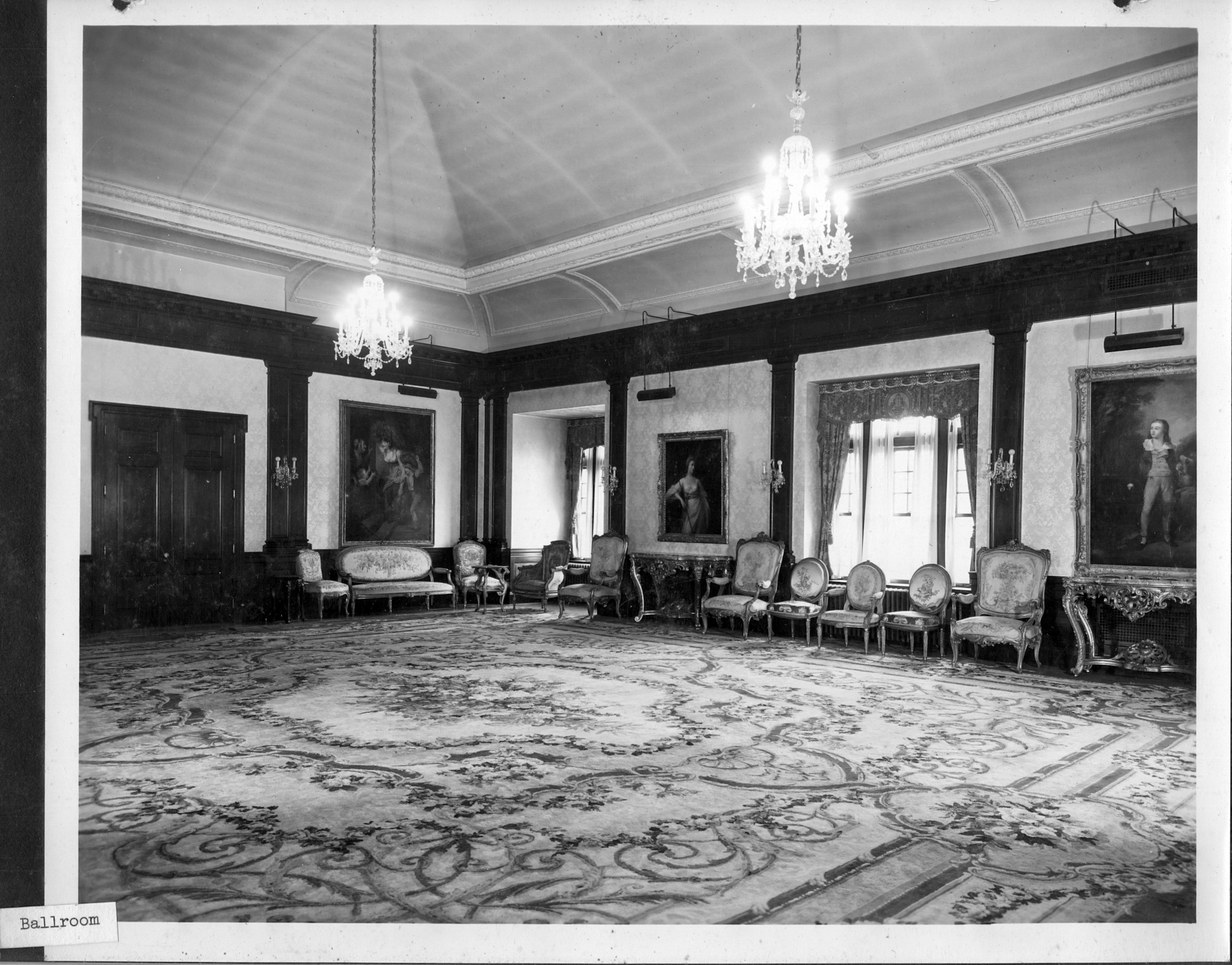
Mahogany Ballroom circa 1929–30

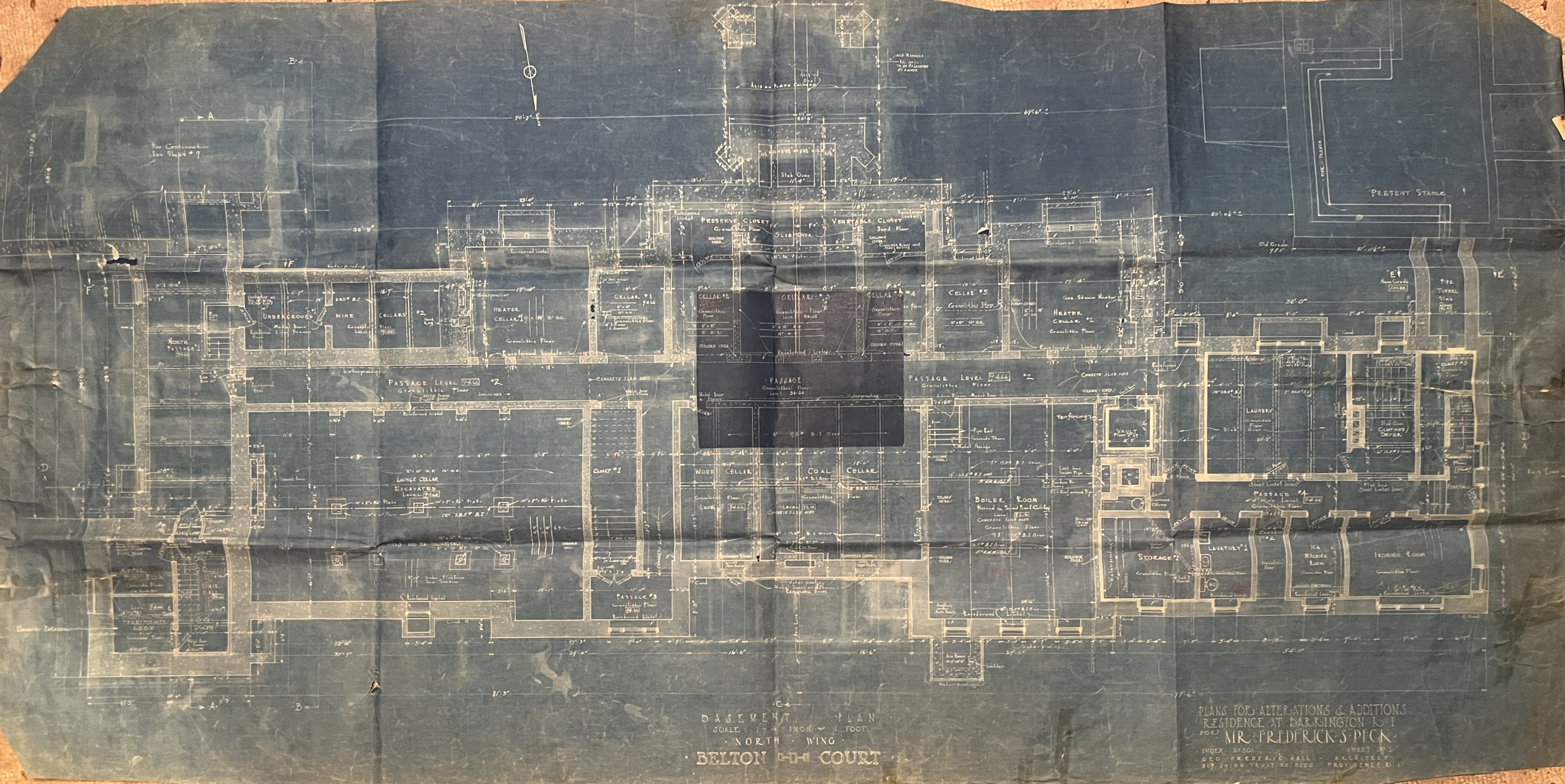

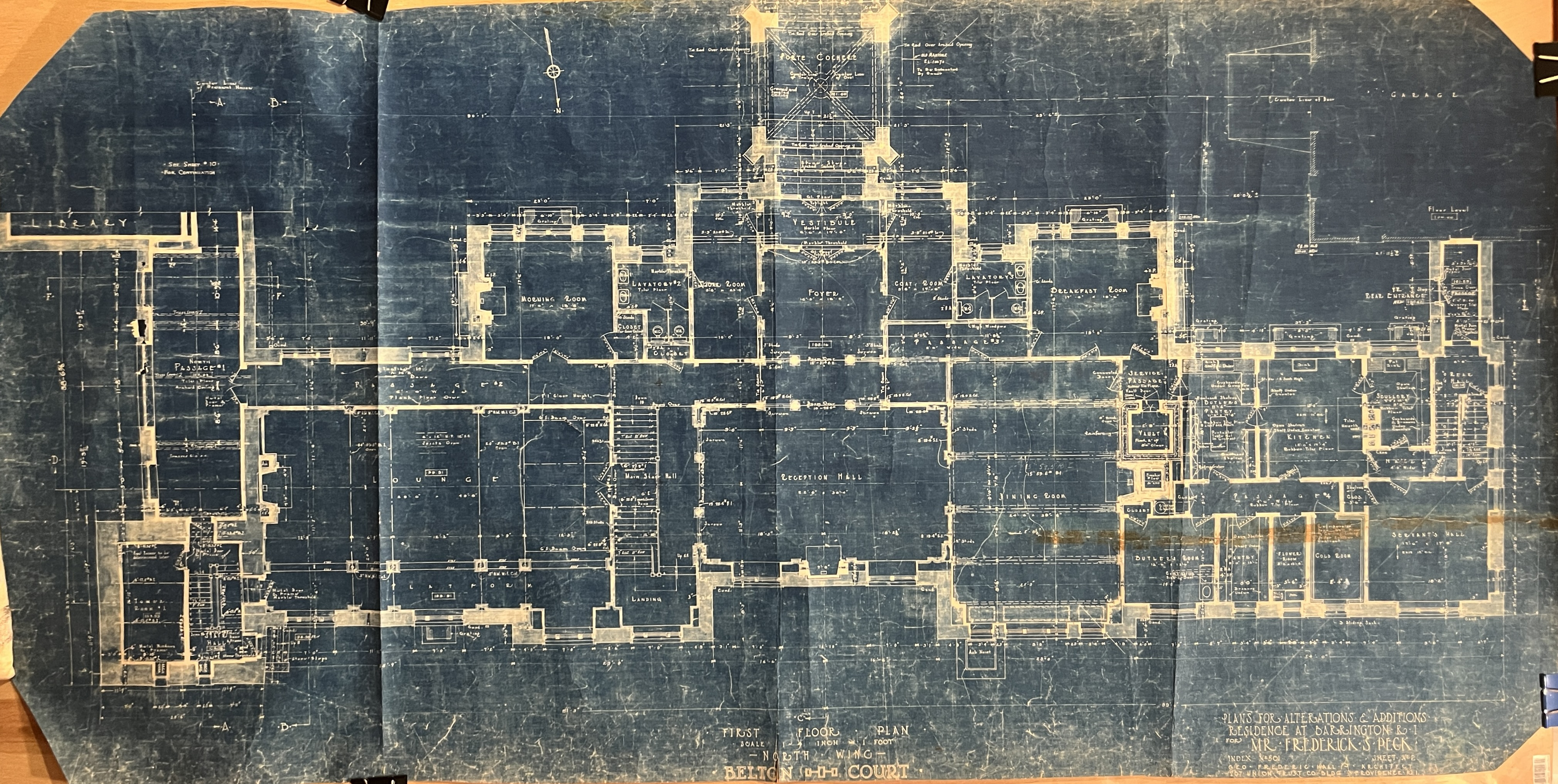

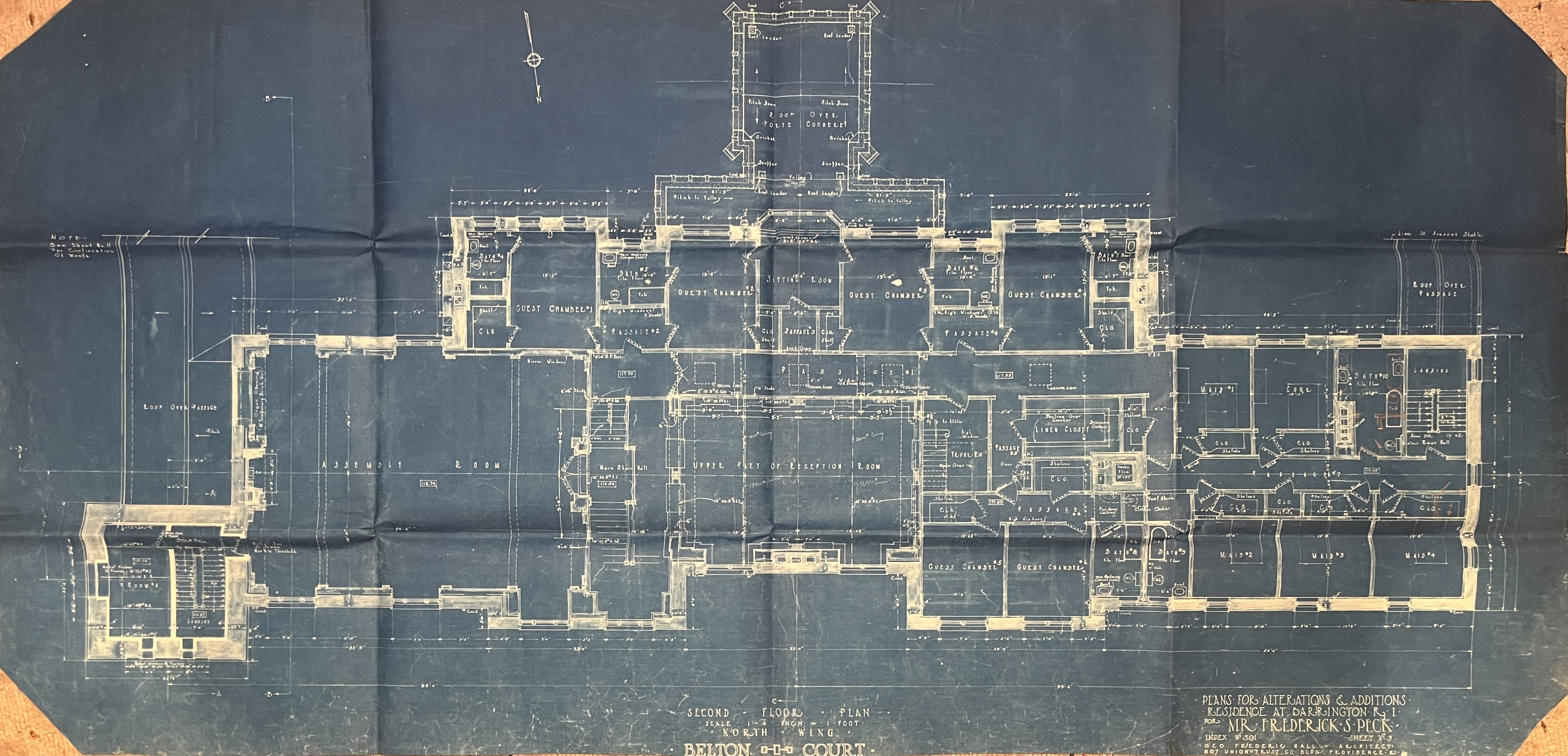

== See also ==
- National Register of Historic Places listings in Bristol County, Rhode Island
- Barrington, Rhode Island
- List of largest houses in United States
