= Bradford Common Historic District =

Historic district in Massachusetts, United States

- U.S. National Register of Historic Places
- U.S. Historic district
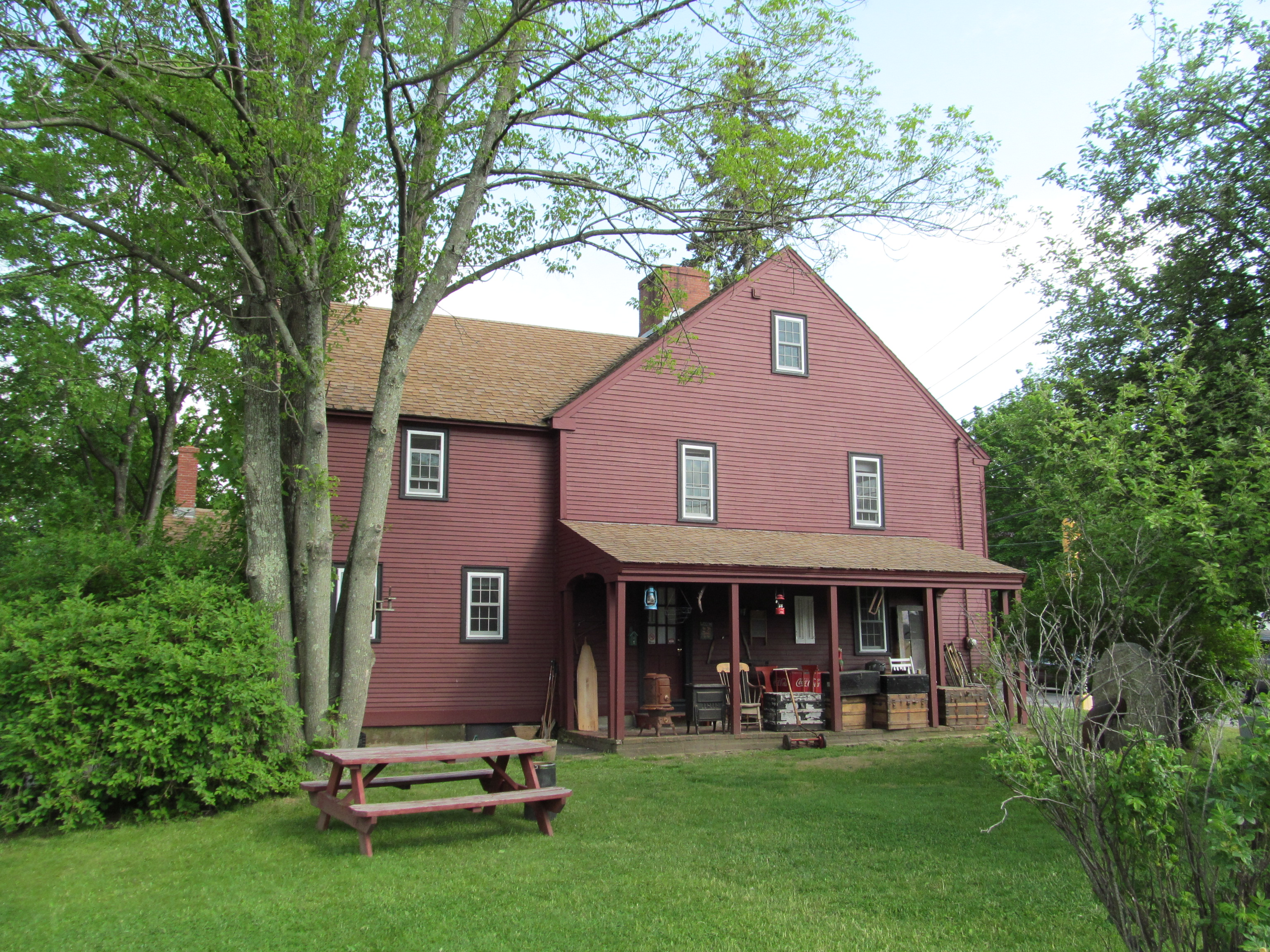
- Kimball Tavern Antiques

- Location within Massachusetts Location within the United States
- Location: Haverhill, Massachusetts
- Coordinates: 42°45′59″N 71°4′45″W
- Area: 35 acres (14 ha)
- Built: 1690
- Architectural style: Italianate, Gothic Revival
- NRHP reference No.: 77000179
- Added to NRHP: September 14, 1977

The Bradford Common Historic District is a historic district encompassing the former town center of Bradford, now a village of Haverhill, Massachusetts. Centered on the former town common at South Main and Salem Streets, the area served as Bradford's civic and commercial center from about 1750 until its annexation by Haverhill in 1897, and retains architecture from the 18th to early 20th centuries. It was added to the National Register of Historic Places in 1977.

== Description and history ==
The town of Bradford was settled in 1649, with its original town center east of the present common. In 1749 this area, located south of the ferry connecting the town to Haverhill (then limited to the north side of the Merrimack River), was given to the town by the Kimball family as a new town center. The oldest building in the district is a former tavern owned by the Kimballs, built about 1690. The village is predominantly residential in character, with the White Church (1848) a prominent fixture in the center. Former civic buildings of Bradford, including its town hall and fire house, have been repurposed; the town hall is now a public school. The largest non-residential portion of the district is the academic campus now occupied by Northpoint Bible College; this campus was originally that of Bradford College, one of the first coeducational academies to be founded.

The historic district is centered on the triangular common formed by South Main Street, Salem Street, and Church Street. South Main and Salem Streets are both early colonial routes connecting Haverhill to Boston and Rowley. The district extends north along South Main to Carleton Avenue, and south past the college campus to Kingsbury Avenue. It extends a shorter distance along Salem Street. Most of the district's buildings are wood-frame houses, 1-1/2 to 2 1/2 stories in height. They are in a diversity of styles, principally those that were popular in the 18th and 19th centuries.

== See also ==
- National Register of Historic Places listings in Essex County, Massachusetts
