= Bradford College (United States) =

Former US liberal arts college

- Bradford College seal
- Former names: Bradford Academy (1803–1932), Bradford Junior College (1932–1971)
- Motto: Surgo ut Prosim
- Type: Private
- Active: 1803–2000
- President: Jean Scott
- Faculty: 33 Fulltime
- Administrative staff: 133
- Students: 600
- Location: Haverhill, MA, USA; 42.765454°N 71.080009°W
- Campus: Suburban

Bradford College was a college in the part of Haverhill, Massachusetts, that was once the town of Bradford. Founded in 1803, Bradford College began as Bradford Academy, one of the earliest coeducational institutions in New England. In 1836, Bradford began educating women exclusively. By 1932, the school had grown from a secondary school and became Bradford Junior College. In 1971 Bradford became authorized to grant bachelor's degrees. The new Bradford College began admitting men again that same year. Bradford College specialized in the creative arts and social sciences, and had one of the oldest alum associations in the country.

On November 19, 1999, its board of trustees announced that the 197-year-old liberal arts institution would close in May 2000. The former campus was later home to Northpoint Bible College from 2008 to 2026.

== History ==
Bradford College traces its origins to Bradford Academy, which was founded in 1803. The academy was incorporated in 1804. Many of Bradford's early graduates became Christian missionaries.

In 1932, Bradford Academy became Bradford Junior College, a liberal arts junior college for women leading to a bachelor's degree. The college became coeducational, and the name changed to Bradford College in 1972.

During the 1990s, annual budget shortfalls of more than $1 million, combined with declining enrollment and revenues and resulting losses due to competition from larger regional institutions, sealed the school's fate. In 1997, the school incurred an $18 million debt when it refinanced old debt and sought funds to build new dormitories.

After 197 years, Bradford College was closed in 2000, leaving 33 full-time professors and 133 employees without jobs.

In late 2007, the remaining endowment of $3.6 million was awarded to Hampshire College, a liberal arts college in Amherst, Massachusetts.

=== Property sold ===
Bradford Academy postcard, ca. 1905

An affiliate of Hobby Lobby stores and its founder David Green, purchased the former Bradford College campus in 2007 and operated Northpoint Bible College there from 2008 until 2026.

=== Presidents ===
1. Marion Coats Graves (1918-1927)
2. Katharine Denworth (1927–1939), graduate of Swarthmore with a doctorate from Columbia
3. Dorothy M. Bell (1940–1967), degrees in classics from Oberlin and Columbia
4. Robert M. Vogel (1968–1972)
5. Jack L. Armstrong (1972–1976)
6. Arthur E. Levine (1982–1989)
7. Joe Short (1989–1998)
8. Jean Scott (1998–2000)

== Notable alumni ==
- George H. Atkinson, missionary in Oregon
- Sarah Charlesworth, artist
- Alice Blanchard Coleman, missionary society leader and writer
- Andre Dubus III, author, son of Bradford faculty Andre Dubus; attended briefly
- Esther Forbes, author of Johnny Tremain and other works
- Ann Hasseltine Judson, 19th-century Christian missionary to Asia
- John Taylor Jones, early missionary to Thailand
- Lucy Goodale Thurston, 19th-century Christian Hawaiian missionary
- Portia Washington Pittman, daughter of Booker T. Washington & the institution's first African-American graduate

== Notable faculty ==
- Douglas Huebler, artist
- Andre Dubus, writer
- Helen Augusta Whittier, taught art history
