= Sarkis Diranian =

Armenian orientalist painter

Sarkis Diranian Սարգիս Տիրանեան
- Born: 1854; Constantinople (now Istanbul), Ottoman Empire
- Died: 1938 (aged 83–84); Paris, France
- Occupation: Painter

Sarkis Diranian (Armenian: Սարգիս Տիրանեան; 1854 - 1938) was an Armenian orientalist painter. Originally from the Ottoman Empire, he was established for many years in Paris.

== Life ==
Diranian was born in 1854 in Constantinople and studied art at the school of drawing and painting opened on Hamalbaşi Street in Beyoğlu by the French artist Pierre Desire Guillemet in 1875. His painting The Enchantress was exhibited in the photography studio of the Abdullah Freres in Beyoğlu in 1883, and on the proceeds from its sale he went to Paris and worked in the studio of Jean-Léon Gérôme. In the year 1883 or 1884, while still in Paris, he was awarded the Mecidiye order by the Ottoman government, and in 1887 the Ottoman Ministry of Education began to pay him a monthly allowance. In 1889 he graduated from the Academy of Fine Arts in Paris, and until 1910 he participated in the exhibitions of the Societe des Artistes Francais in Paris. In 1892 and 1900 he won the prize of honor at the international Paris exhibitions. In 1908 he held a one-person exhibition in Paris and in 1909 participated in a mixed exhibition in Munich. He died in Paris in 1938.

== Works ==
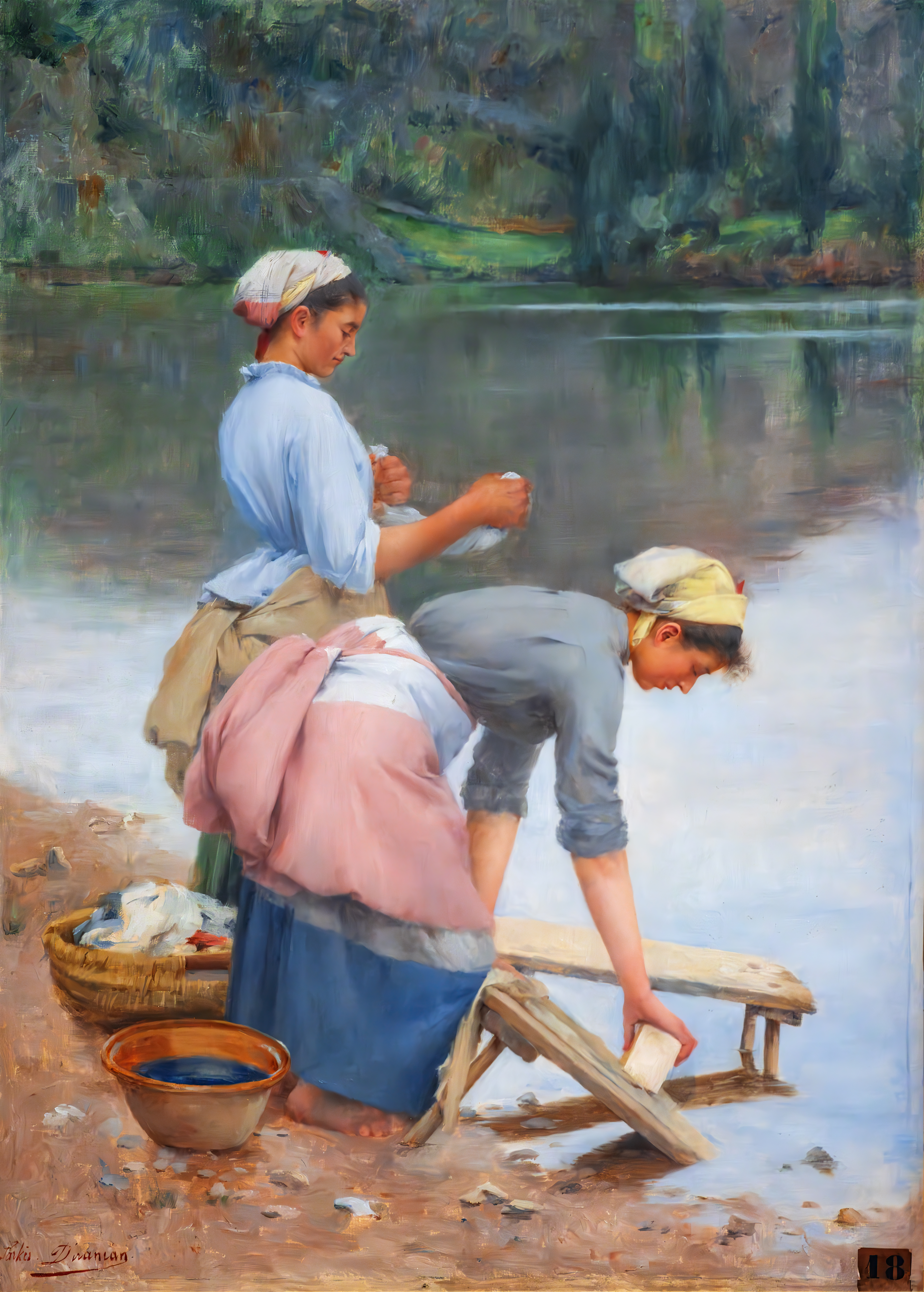
Les Laveuses au bord du Lot - Musée de Cahors

His major works include Woman Tying a Rose (1897), The Dancer and Five O'Clock exhibited in Paris in 1910, Naked Woman in the collection at the Dolmabahçe Palace, and Children Playing Knuckbones in the collection of the presidential residence in Ankara.

== See also ==
- List of Orientalist artists
- Orientalism
