= Northpoint Bible College =

Christian college in Haverhill, MA, USA

Northpoint Bible College and Seminary
- Former names: Mount Zion Bible School, School of the Prophets, Zion Bible Institute, Zion Bible College, Northpoint Bible College & Graduate School, Northpoint Bible College and Seminary
- Type: Private Bible college and seminary
- Active: 1924–2026
- Religious affiliation: Assemblies of God
- Location: Haverhill, Massachusetts, U.S. 42.7655°N 71.0800°W
- Colors: Blue & gold
- Mascot: Eagle
- Website: northpoint.edu

Northpoint Bible College and Seminary was a private Pentecostal Bible college and seminary in Haverhill, Massachusetts. The college's purpose was to teach and train students for Pentecostal ministry for the spread of the Christian gospel. It offered undergraduate and graduate degrees in Biblical Studies and Practical Theology.

Following the loss of its accreditation pursuant to long-term financial difficulties, President Tiff Shuttlesworth announced in June 2026 that the college would close its undergraduate and graduate programs and offer noncredit programs. The institution's name will also change to Northpoint School of the Bible in September.

== History ==
The School of the Prophets was founded as a volunteer-run institution in 1924 by Christine Gibson at East Providence, Rhode Island. It was also at one time named Mount Zion Bible School. Later, as the Zion Bible Institute, it was closely associated with Zion Gospel Temple, originally a Holiness congregation founded in the late 19th century by Alphaeus Cleveland and subsequently pastored by Christine Gibson. The congregation later affiliated with the Pentecostal revival and continued as an independent Pentecostal church named Zion Gospel Temple. The nearby Zion Faith Home, Inc., a retirement home for missionaries, was also connected with the school and church for many years while the campus was located in East Providence, Rhode Island.

In 1985, Zion Bible Institute relocated to the former campus of Barrington College in Barrington, Rhode Island. At the time the institute was under the leadership of N. Benjamin Crandall, president from 1985 to 2000. The centerpiece of the campus was the former Peck Mansion, a building listed on the registry of historic sites for the state of Rhode Island. Renamed as the Gibson Memorial Building in honor of the institute's founder, it housed the President's Office, a variety of additional offices, and the library.

Following Crandall, George Cope served as president from 2000 to 2005. The college became affiliated with the Assemblies of God USA in 2000. In 2001, it was accredited by the Association for Biblical Higher Education.

In 2007, Charles Crabtree, a former assistant superintendent of the Assemblies of God, accepted the position of president. Also in 2007, David Green, CEO and founder of the Hobby Lobby chain of hobby stores, purchased the former Bradford College campus in Haverhill, Massachusetts. The 18-acre (73,000 m^{2}) campus was given to Zion Bible College, and Zion was to fund the repairs and upgrades needed before commencing operations there. An estimated $5 million worth of repairs and upgrades were completed before the campus reopened for the fall semester of 2008. Enrollment doubled from 200 to 400.

In 2012, the school's trustees changed the college's name to Northpoint Bible College, effective January 1, 2013.

In 2012, J. David Arnett was elected to serve as the eighth president. The next year, the Massachusetts Board of Higher Education approved the addition of Master's Degrees and Associate of Arts Degrees. In 2017, the National Council for State Authorization Reciprocity Agreement approved Northpoint to offer postsecondary distance education courses and programs online. A Hispanic Seminary (Northpoint Universidad Bíblica y Seminario) was added in the fall of 2022.

The college lost its accreditation in 2026 due to significant financial challenges. Subsequently, college leaders announced that the college would cease offering undergraduate and graduate programs and instead offer noncredit programs. They also plan to change the institution's name to Northpoint School of the Bible in September.

== Campus ==
Campus of Bradford Academy, ca. 1905

The campus, formerly that of Bradford College, is located in the Bradford section of Haverhill at 320 South Main Street, Haverhill, MA 01835.

== Affiliations ==
NPBC was accredited by the Association for Biblical Higher Education. The institution is also endorsed by the Assemblies of God USA.

As of the fall of 2024, Northpoint Bible College remained unaccredited by the New England Commission of Higher Education (NECHE), the major regional governing body that determines and approves the academic standing of accredited Bachelor of Arts and Science degree programs.

== Student life ==
Chapel was held Monday through Thursday. Attendance was mandatory for all full-time students.

In 2016, the college was granted an exemption from some of the provisions of Title IX that forbid discrimination on the basis of sex.

== Distance education ==
Northpoint Bible College had satellite distance-education campuses in Grand Rapids, Michigan, Crestwood, Kentucky, Texarkana, Arkansas, and Los Angeles, California; these were closed in November 2025 by a decision of the Association for Biblical Higher Education.

== Gallery ==
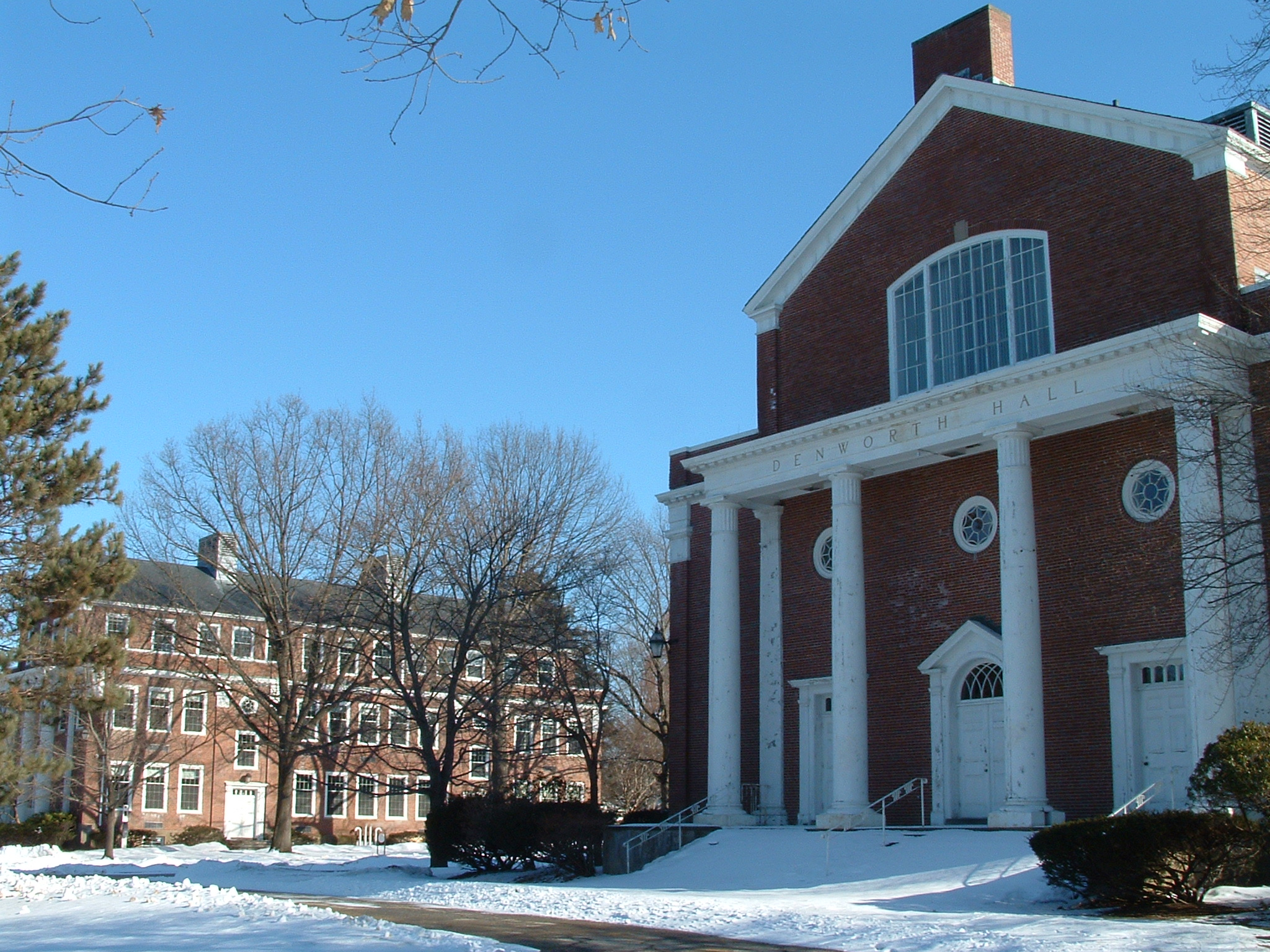
Denworth Hall

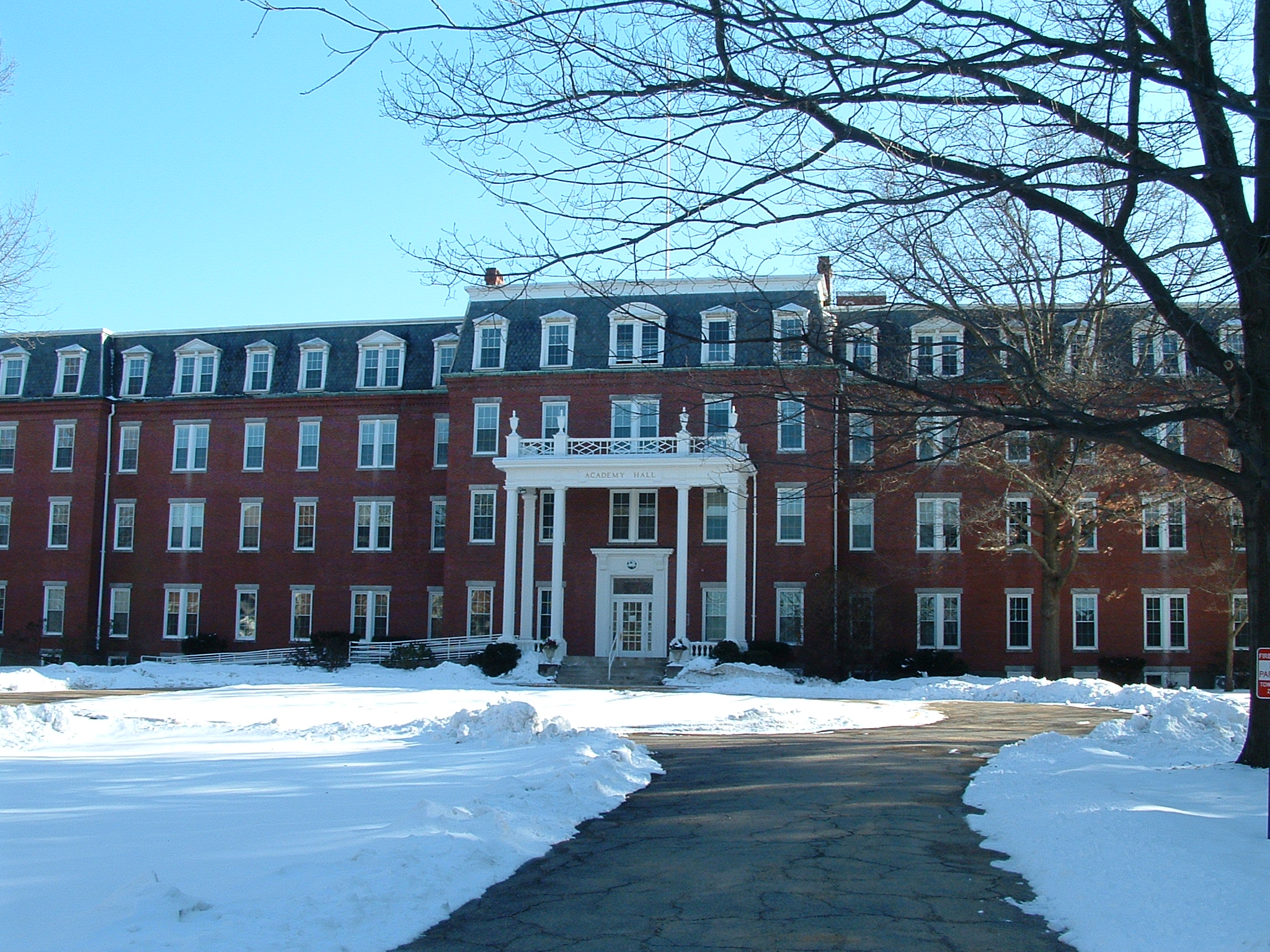
Academy Hall, administration, student services, residential

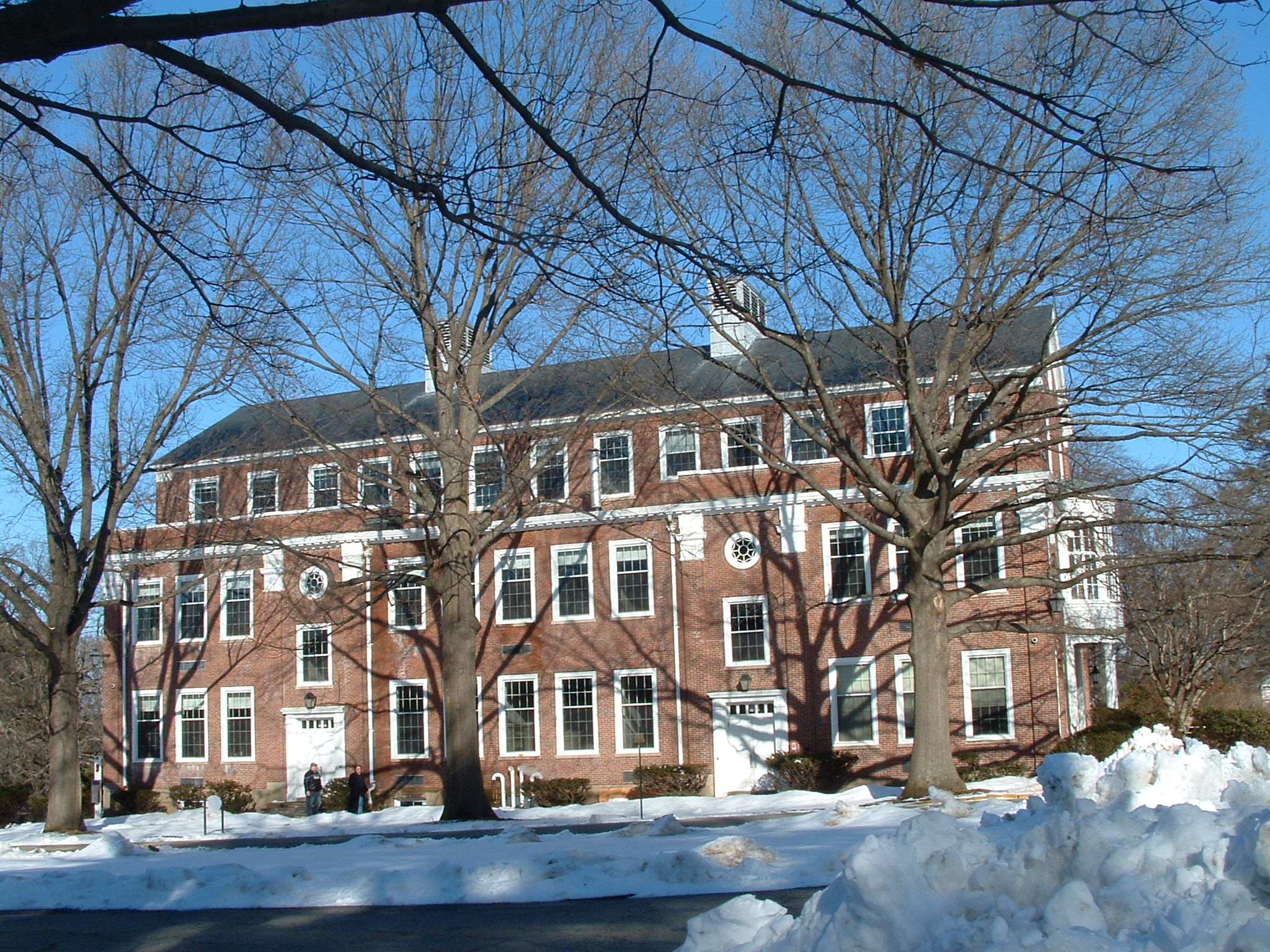
Hasseltine Classroom Building, classes, faculty offices

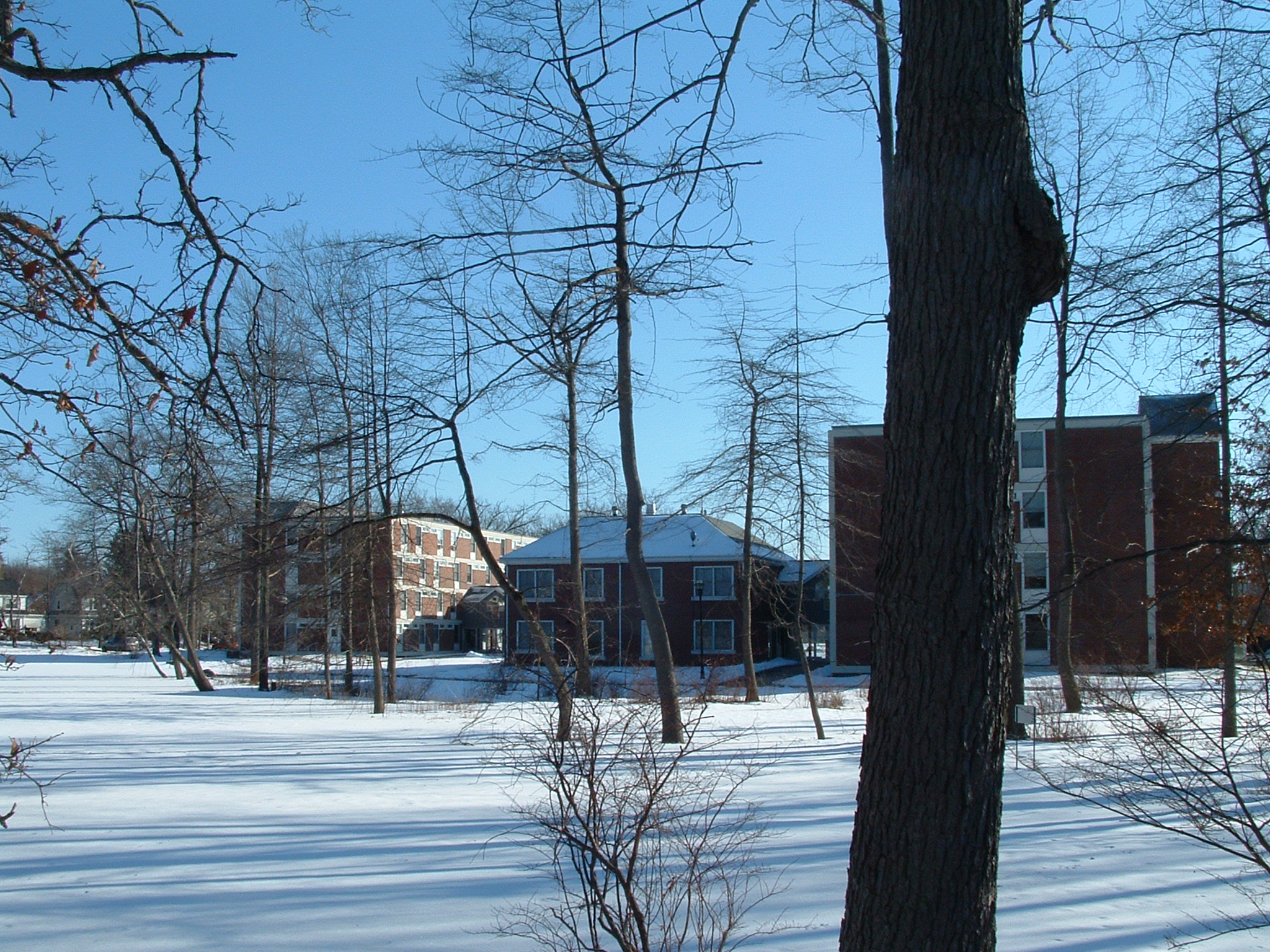
Student residence halls

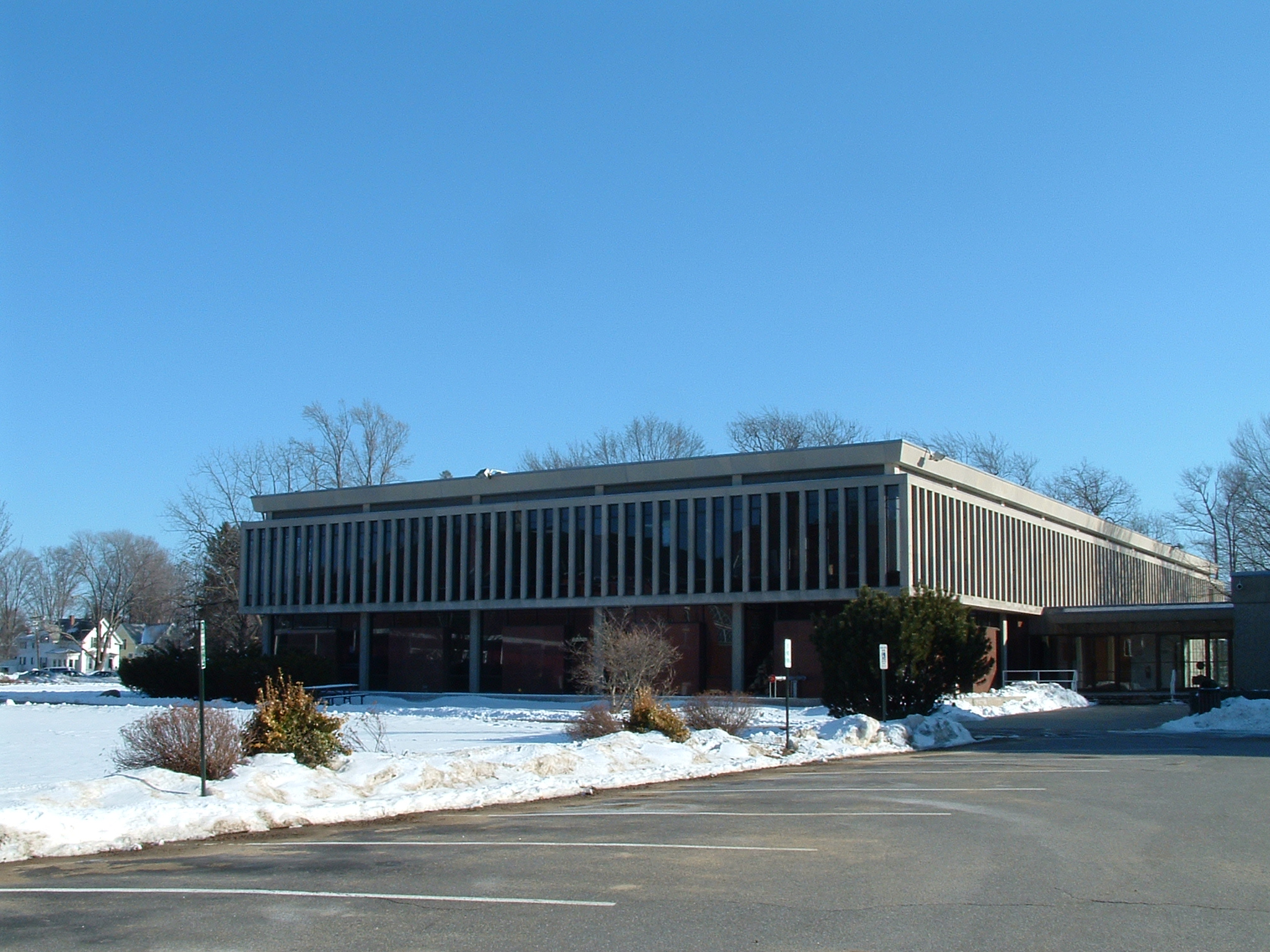
Library
