= Martin & Hall =

Defunct American architectural firm

Practice information
- Founders: Frank H. Martin; George Frederic Hall
- Founded: 1893
- Location: Providence, Rhode Island

Significant works and honors
- Buildings: Belton Court; Classical High School; Museum of Natural History; Rhode Island Normal School; Shepard Stores; Squantum Association

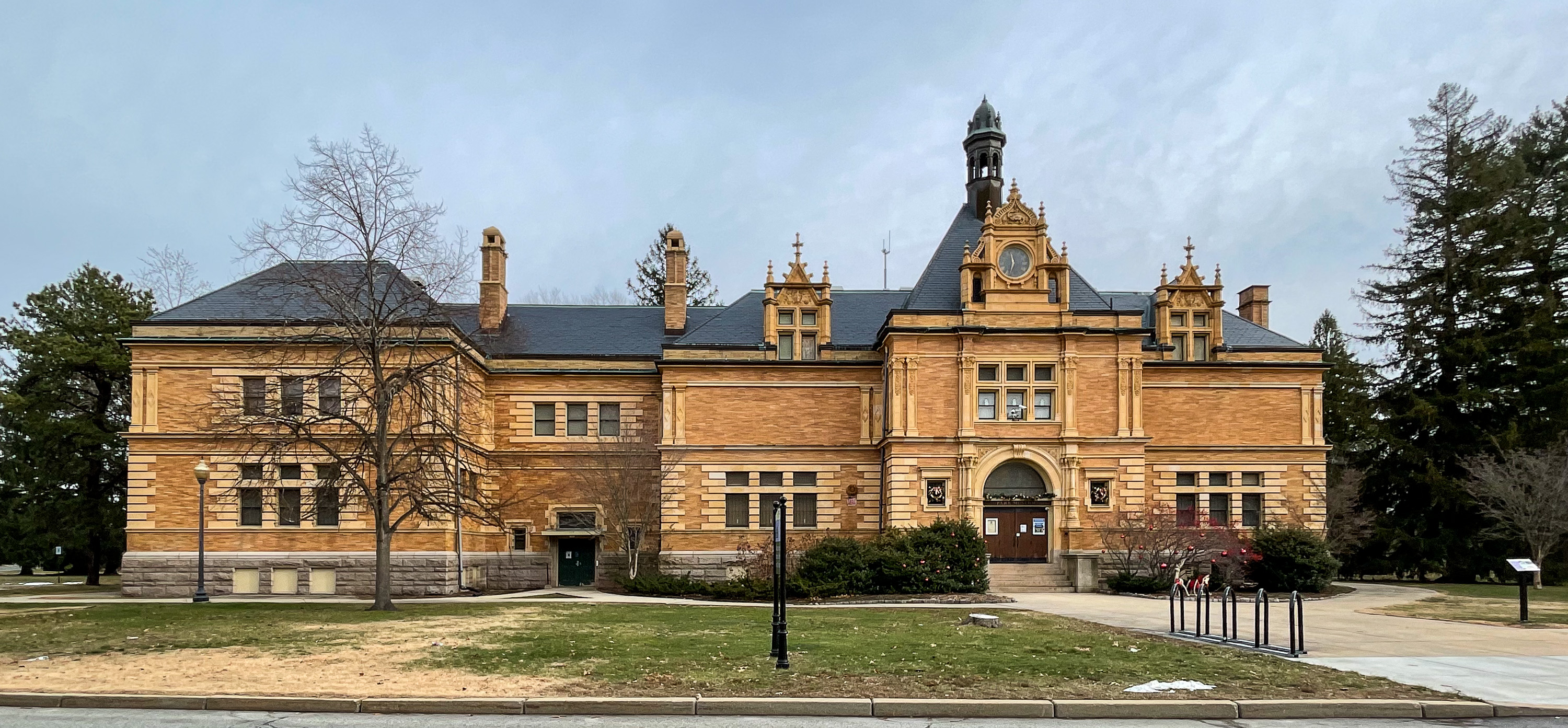
The Roger Williams Park Museum of Natural History and Planetarium in Providence, designed by Martin & Hall in the Châteauesque style and completed in 1895 with an addition in 1916.

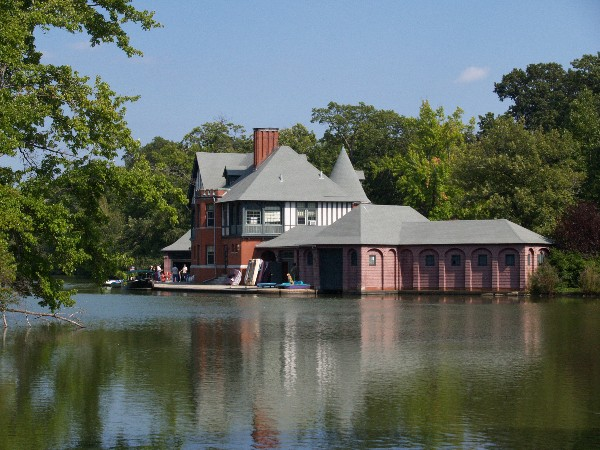
The Clark Dalrymple Boathouse in Roger Williams Park, designed by Martin & Hall in the Tudor Revival style and completed in 1896.

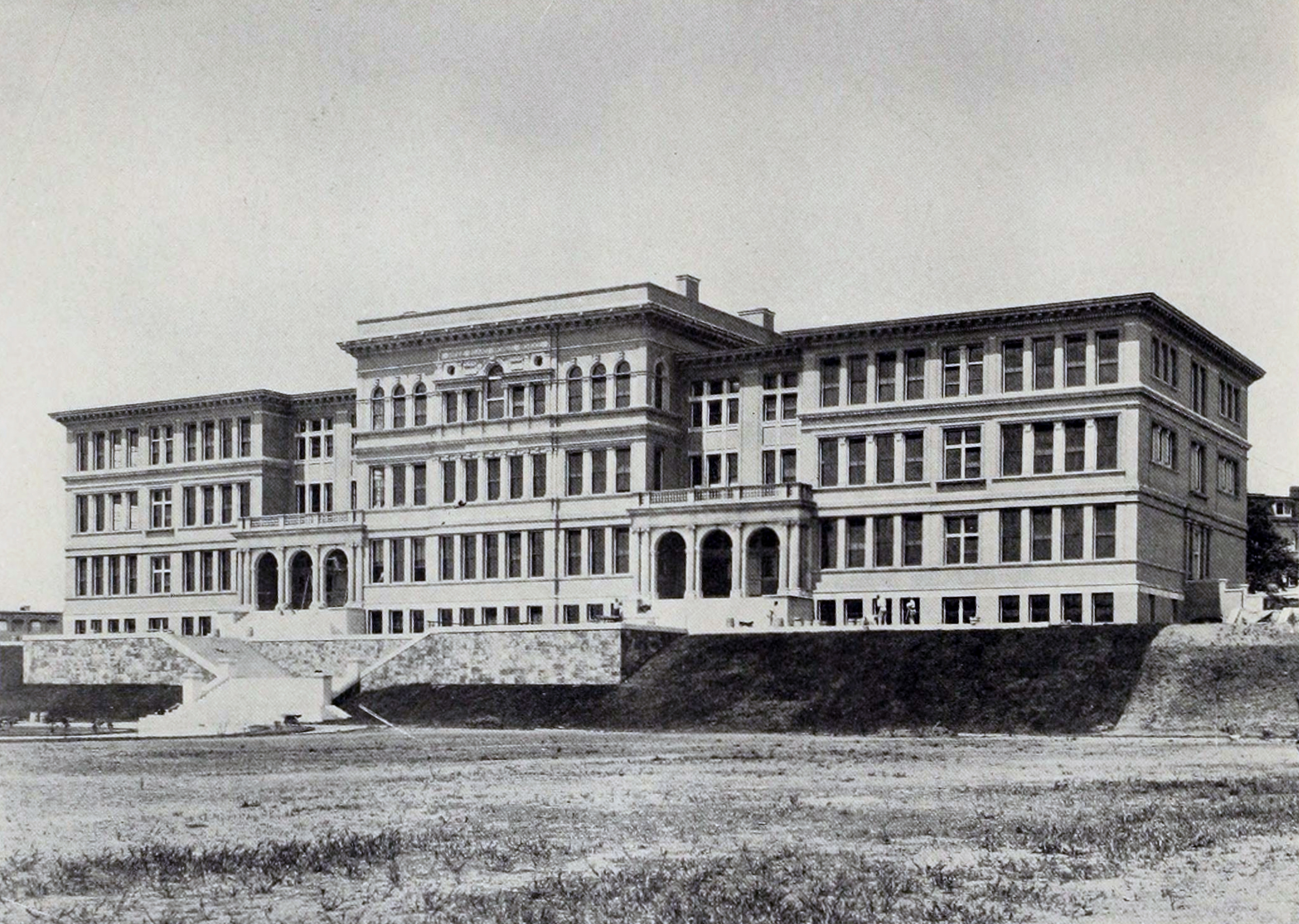
The former Rhode Island Normal School in Providence, designed by Martin & Hall in the Italian Renaissance Revival style and completed in 1898.

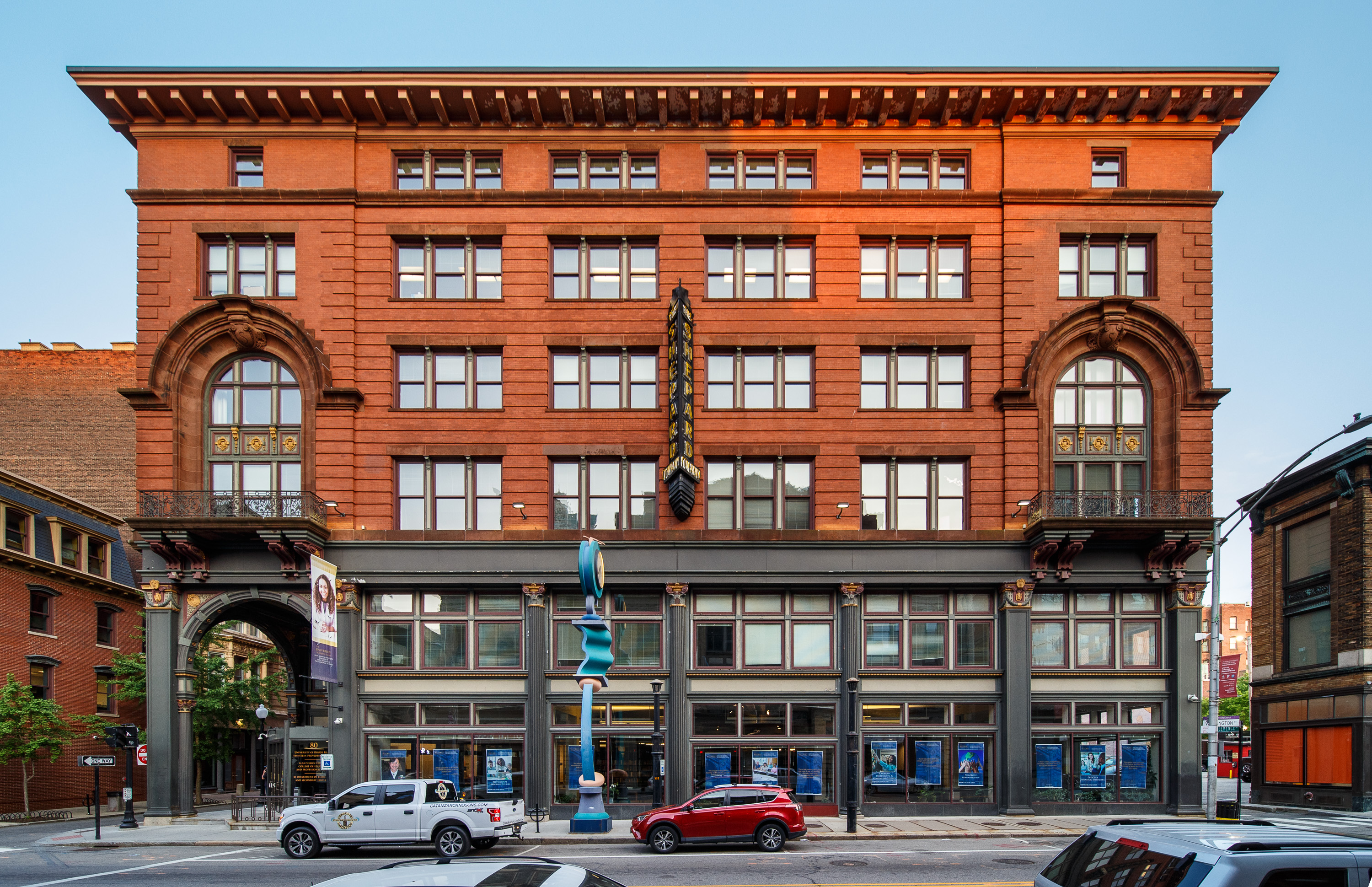
The Shepard Company Building in Providence, designed by Martin & Hall in the Italian Renaissance Revival style and completed in 1903.

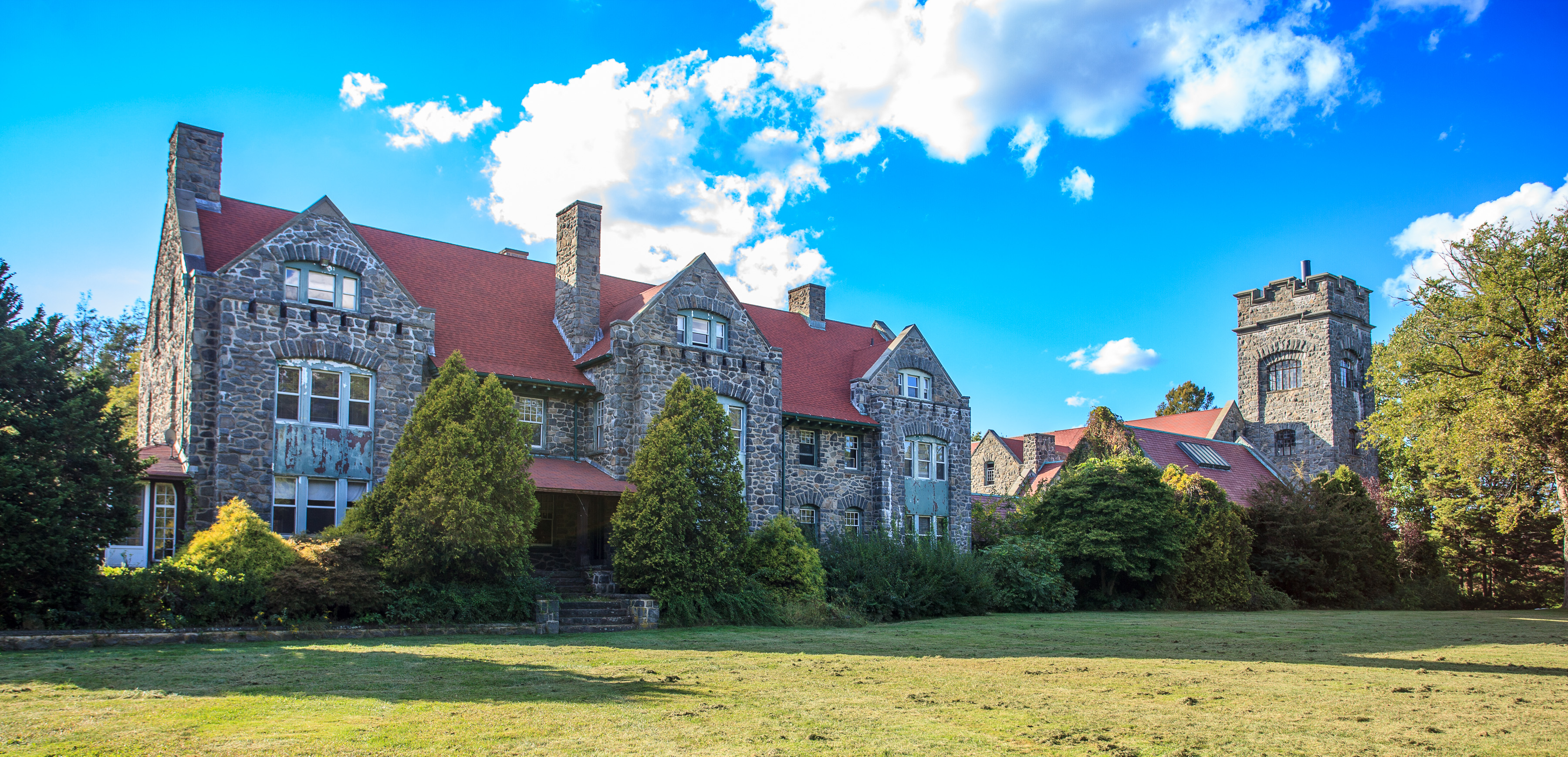
Belton Court in Barrington, designed by Martin & Hall in the Arts and Crafts style and completed in 1906. A major addition designed by Hall alone in the Tudor Revival style was completed in 1928.

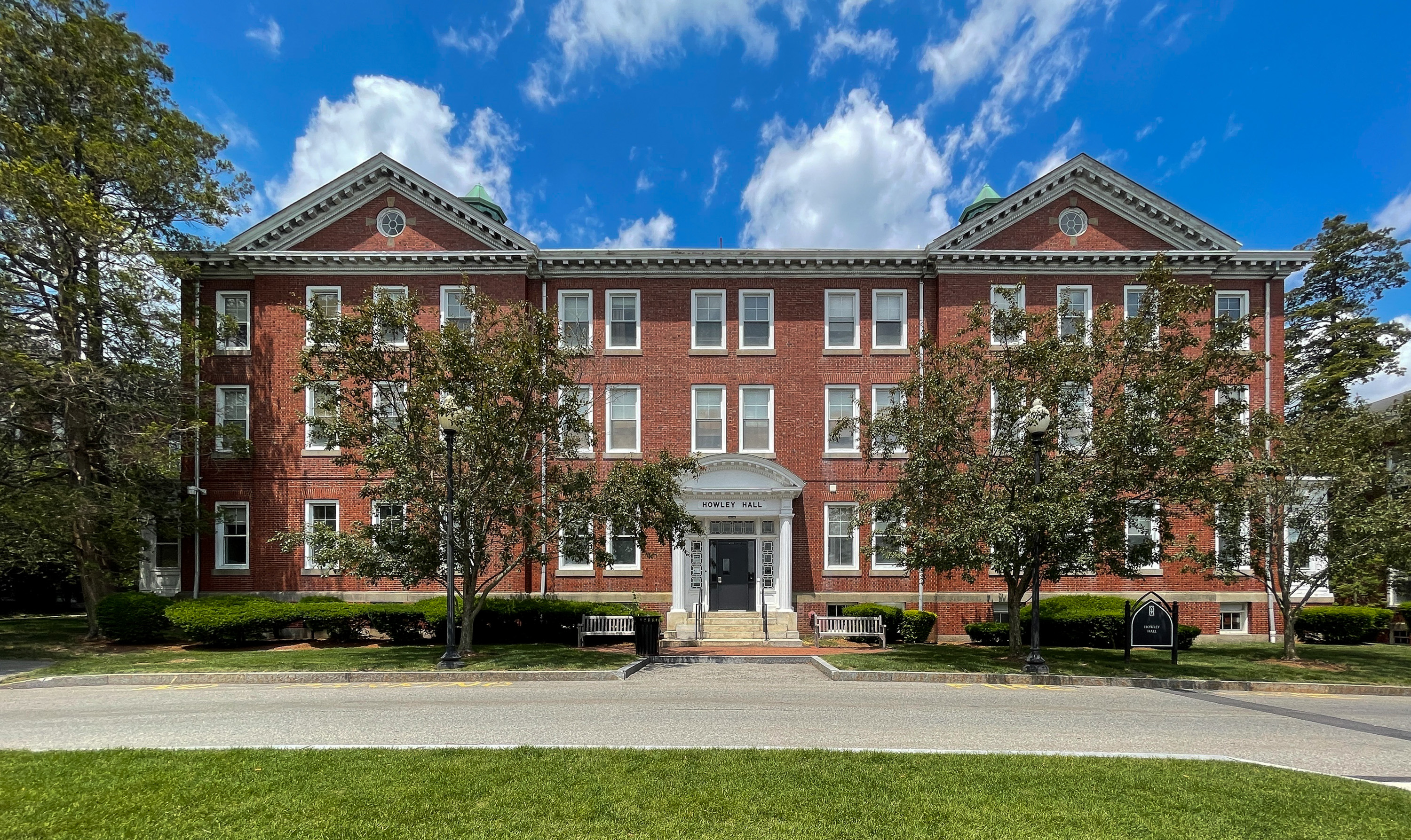
The administration building of the former Providence City Hospital, now Howley Hall of Providence College, designed by Martin & Hall in the Colonial Revival style and completed in 1910.

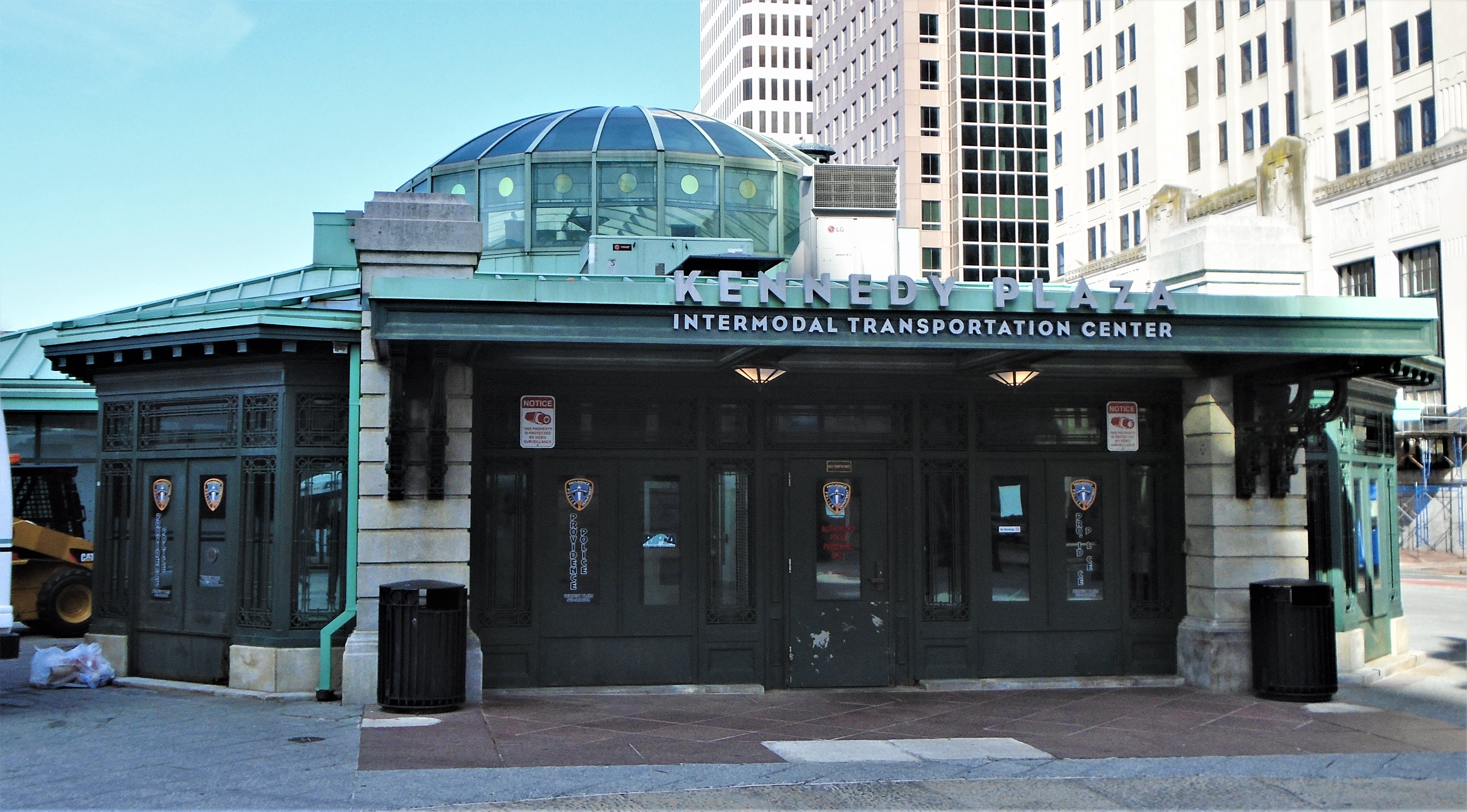
The former trolley shelter in Kennedy Plaza, designed by Martin & Hall in an Art Nouveau-inspired style and completed in 1914.

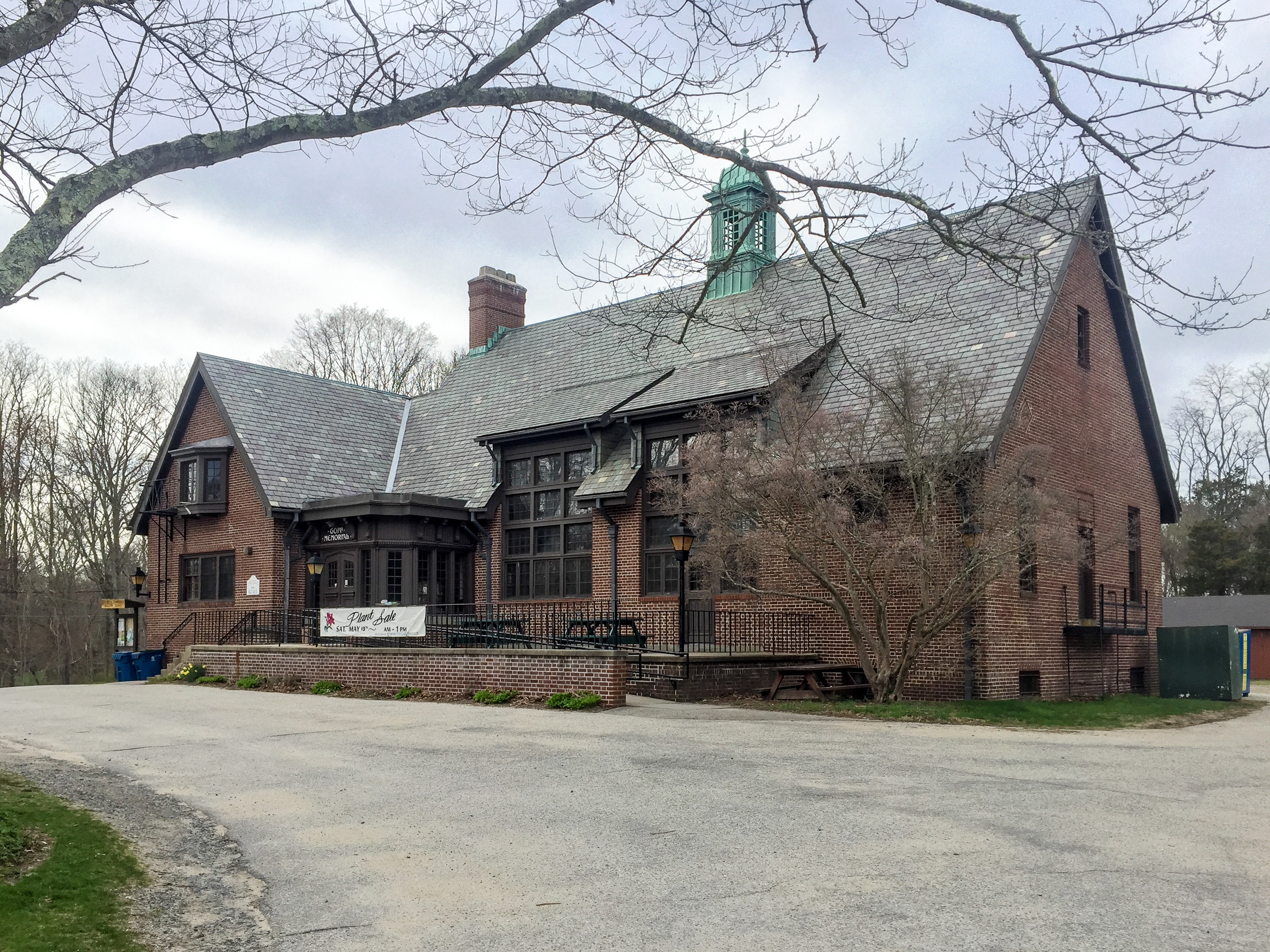
The Blanding Free Public Library and Goff Memorial Hall in Rehoboth, Massachusetts, designed by Martin & Hall in the Arts and Crafts style and completed in 1915.

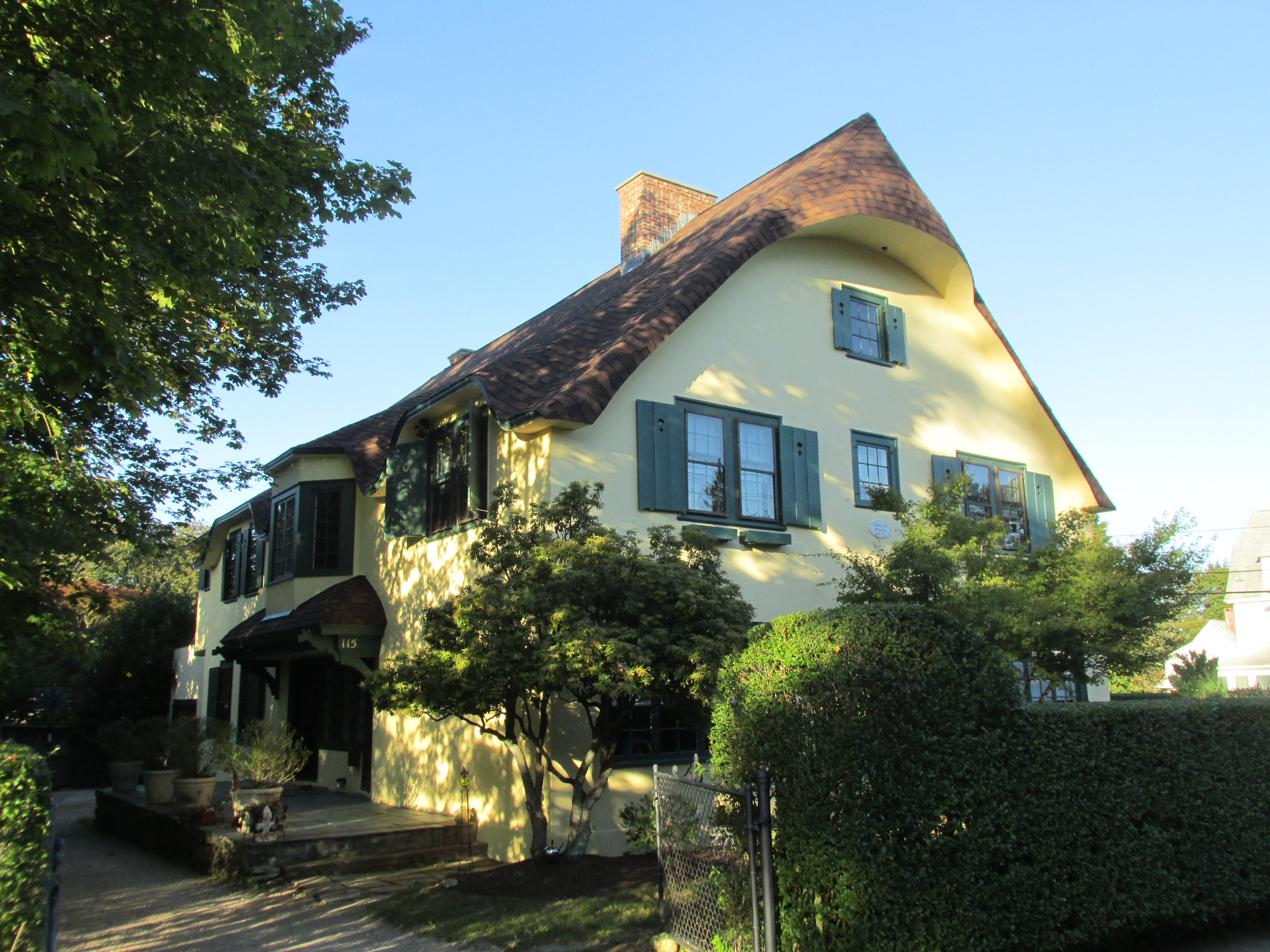
Yellow Patch in Narragansett Pier, designed by Martin & Hall in the Storybook style and completed in 1916.

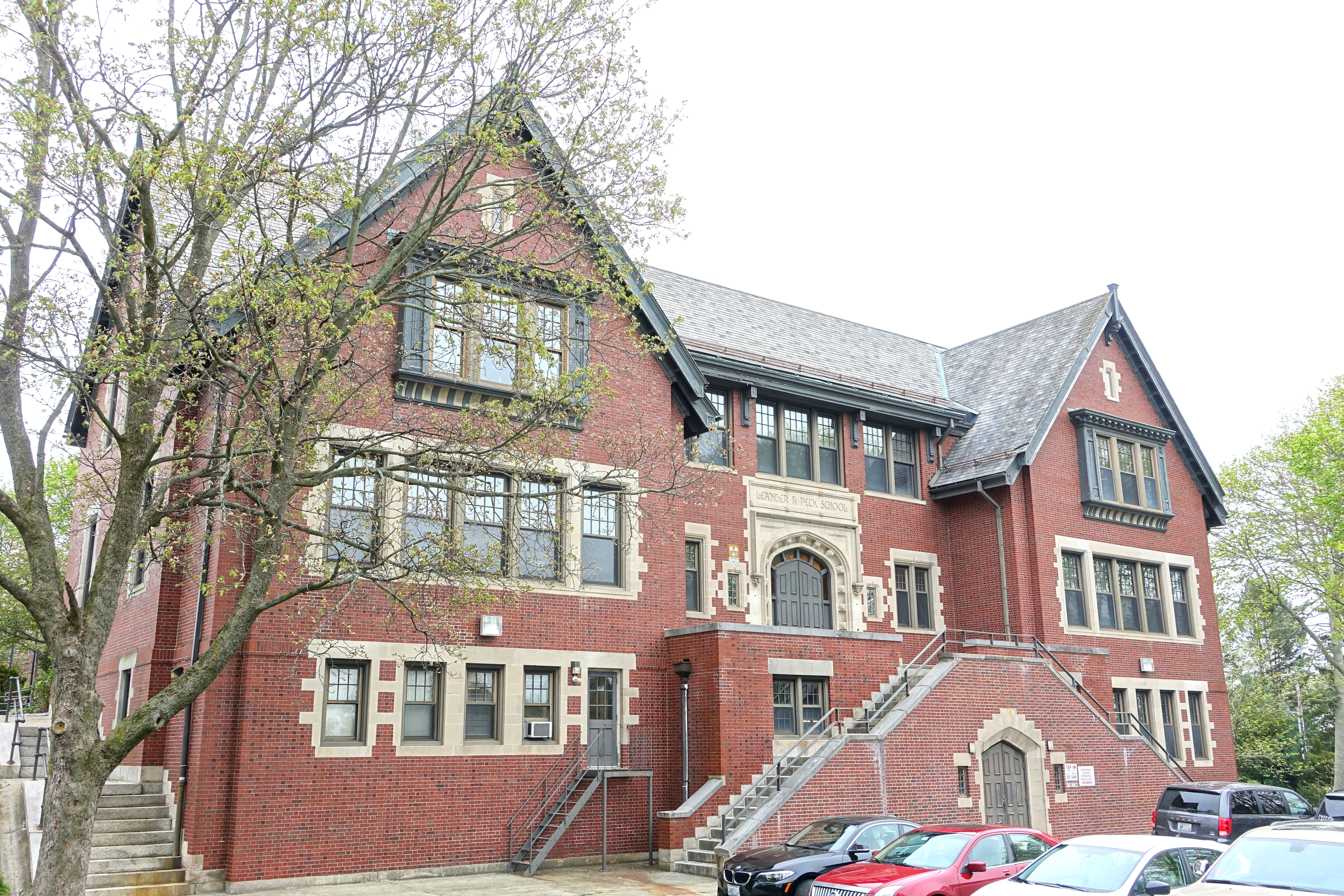
The former Leander R. Peck School in Barrington, designed by Martin & Hall in the Tudor Revival style and completed in 1917.

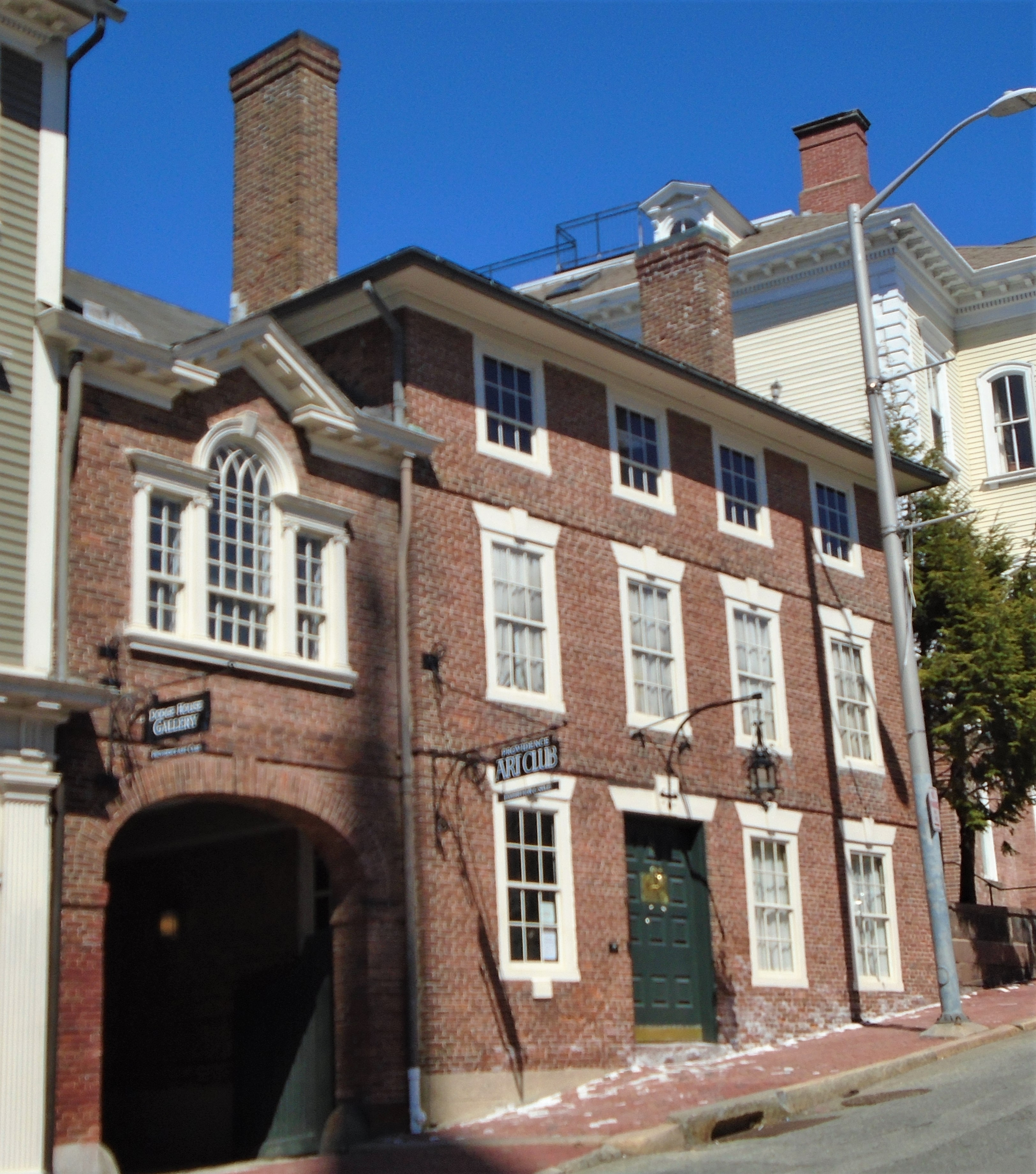
The Providence Art Club, renovated by Hall alone in the Colonial Revival style and completed in 1920.

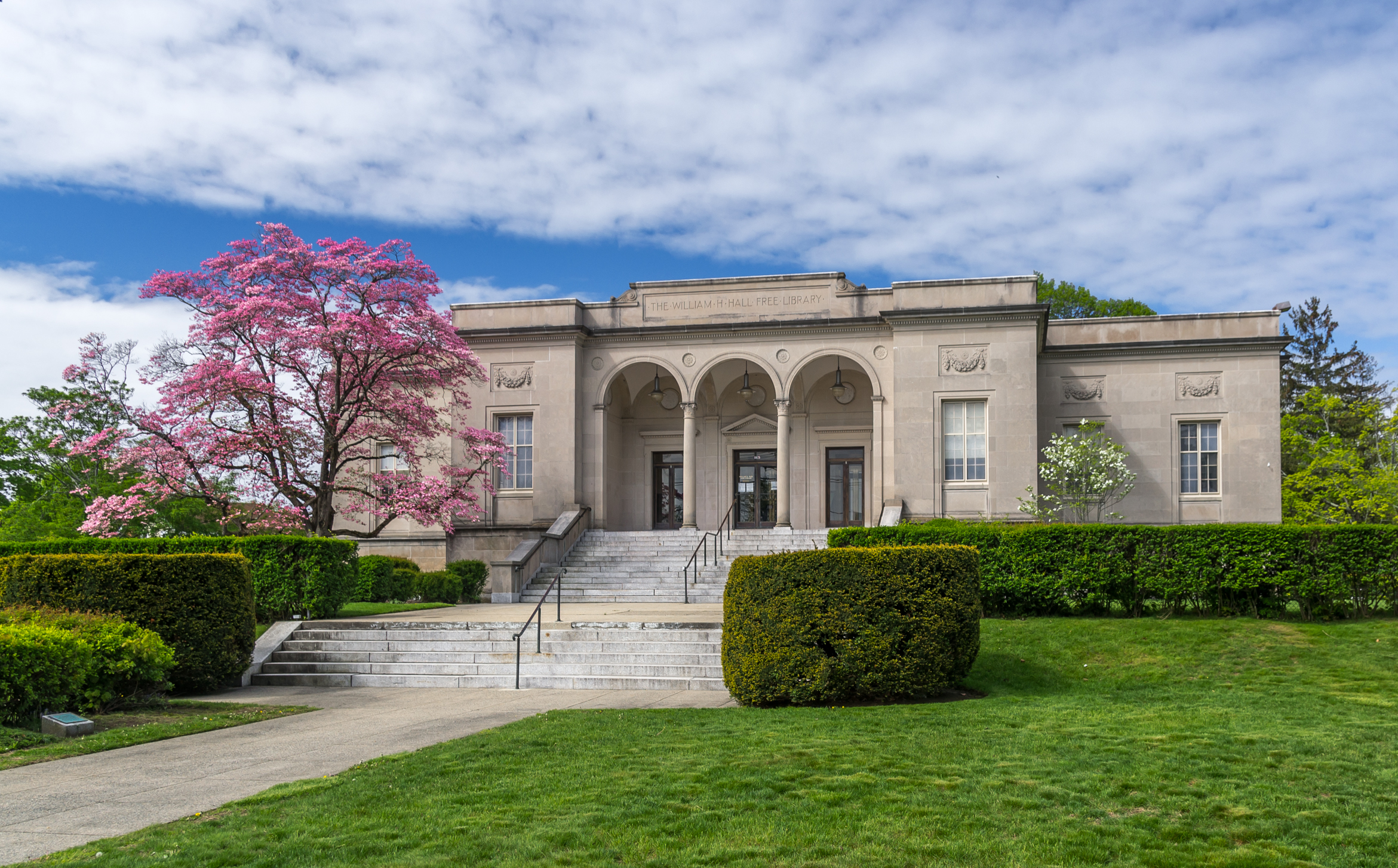
The William H. Hall Free Library in Cranston, designed by Hall alone in the Italian Renaissance Revival style and completed in 1927.

Martin & Hall was an American architectural firm based in Providence, Rhode Island. It was established in 1893 as the partnership of architects Frank H. Martin and George Frederic Hall. After Martin's death in 1917 Hall practiced alone until his own death in 1928.

== History ==
The firm was founded February 1, 1893, when the two men, who were senior employees of the leading local firm, Stone, Carpenter & Willson, opened their own practice. They took several clients with them, resulting in a rift with their former employers. Likely as a result of this, both were denied membership in the local chapter of the American Institute of Architects (AIA) until after the deaths of Alfred Stone and Edmund R. Willson. Martin & Hall developed a successful general practice and did not specialize in any one type of building. Their work was concentrated in Rhode Island with a small number of projects in other New England states and one in Texas.

The firm's first office was located on Custom House Street. In 1894 they moved into the just-completed Industrial Trust Building, now demolished. In 1901 they again moved to the new Union Trust Company Building, where they would remain. Both of these buildings were designed by their former employers, Stone, Carpenter & Willson.

Martin died unexpectedly in 1917. Hall continued the firm as a sole proprietorship until his own death in 1928.

== Partner biographies ==
=== Frank H. Martin ===
Frank Howard Martin AIA (March 9, 1863 – February 2, 1917) was born in Seekonk, Massachusetts, to Sylvester G. Martin and Susan B. Martin, née Padelford. He was educated in the Providence public schools and at the Massachusetts Institute of Technology. He then worked in New York City for architects including Renwick, Aspinwall & Russell. In 1888 he returned to Providence and joined the office of Stone, Carpenter & Willson.

Martin was married in 1887 to Annie W. Burgess of Lynn, Massachusetts. They had one child, Maude Potter Martin. In 1915 she married William Low Studley, son of J. Edward Studley of the William H. Low Estate Company, a repeat client of the firm. Martin was a member of the AIA, the Architectural League of New York and the Providence Art Club. He also served as senior warden of the vestry of S. Stephen's Church. He died at home in Providence after a brief illness at the age of 53.

=== George Frederic Hall ===
George Frederic Hall AIA (June 11, 1866 – September 6, 1928) was born in Providence to Alvin E. Hall and Martha Louise Hall, née Andrews. He was educuated in the Providence public schools before joining Stone, Carpenter & Willson. While employed by the firm he independently designed a building on the Seekonk River for the Narragansett Boat Club (1891), of which he was a member.

Hall was married in 1897 to Mary Woodbury Polleys of Providence. They had no children. Hall was a member of the AIA, the Narragansett Boat Club, the Wannamoisett Country Club and the Providence Art Club, of which he was president for six consecutive terms. In 1928 he was appointed secretary of the commission responsible for erecting a statue of Oliver Hazard Perry at the Rhode Island State House; it was dedicated about two weeks after his death. While superintending construction of the Industrial Trust Building he became ill, and died several weeks later at the age of 62.

== Legacy ==
Martin & Hall followed the architectural approach established by their former employer, Stone, Carpenter & Willson. Most of their buildings were designed in contemporary revival styles, typically the Colonial Revival, Gothic Revival and Neoclassical styles. A small group of early projects, such as their first major completed work, the Roger Williams Park Museum of Natural History (1895), are Châteauesque. They differed from Stone, Carpenter & Willson chiefly in their exaggerated approach to detail and proportion. A later group of buildings, including the Edwin A. Smith Building (1912) and their two public toilets, feature elaborate wrought-iron detail which is evocative of the Art Nouveau architecture of the 1900 Paris Exposition. The Smith building is also Rhode Island's exemplary example of the Commercial Style as it was then being developed in Chicago.

Three notable Rhode Island architects, Wallis Eastburn Howe, Norman M. Isham and Ambrose J. Murphy, worked for Martin & Hall. John Forbes Hogan also worked for Hall during the latter part of his career.

At least five buildings designed by Martin & Hall have been listed on the United States National Register of Historic Places, and others by the firm and by Hall alone contribute to listed historic districts.

== Architectural works ==
All dates are date of completion. Buildings built after 1917 are attributed to Hall alone.

- 1893 – St. Maria's Home (former), 125 Governor St, Providence, Rhode Island
- 1895 – Roger Williams Park Museum of Natural History, Roger Williams Park, Providence, Rhode Island
  - Martin & Hall completed a large north wing in 1916. A contributing resource to the NRHP-listed Roger Williams Park Historic District.
- 1896 – Clark Dalrymple Boathouse, Roger Williams Park, Providence, Rhode Island
  - A contributing resource to the NRHP-listed Roger Williams Park Historic District.
- 1896 – St. Francis Xavier Academy (former), 60 Broad St, Providence, Rhode Island
  - Now Xavier Hall of Johnson & Wales University.
- 1897 – Broad Street Grammar School (former), 1450 Broad St, Providence, Rhode Island
- 1897 – Classical High School, 124 Pond St, Providence, Rhode Island
  - Demolished.
- 1897 – William H. Low Building, 229 Westminster St, Providence, Rhode Island
  - A contributing resource to the NRHP-listed Downtown Providence Historic District.
- 1897 – St. John's Episcopal Church (former), 80 Lexington Ave, East Boston, Boston
  - Wallis Eastburn Howe, principal designer. A contributing resource to the NRHP-listed Eagle Hill Historic District.
- 1897 – St. Vincent de Paul Infant Asylum, Regent Ave and Wolcott St, Providence, Rhode Island
  - Demolished.
- 1898 – Alice Building, 236 Westminster St, Providence, Rhode Island
  - A contributing resource to the NRHP-listed Downtown Providence Historic District.
- 1898 – Hope High School, 331 Hope St, Providence, Rhode Island
  - Demolished.
- 1898 – Rhode Island Normal School, 199 Promenade St, Providence, Rhode Island
  - After Rhode Island College moved to Mount Pleasant in 1958, this building was used for state offices and courts. Demolished to build Providence Place; some ornament was salvaged and reused in the John Nazarian Center for the Performing Arts on the present college campus.
- 1900 – Squantum Association, 947 Veterans Memorial Hwy, Riverside, Rhode Island
  - NRHP-listed.
- 1901 – American Textile Mill, 250 Esten Ave, Pawtucket, Rhode Island
  - Wallis Eastburn Howe, principal designer.
- 1901 – St. Michael's Catholic Church, 251 Oxford St, Providence, Rhode Island
  - Martin & Hall were responsible for the basement church only. Ambrose J. Murphy, probable principal designer. Murphy, Hindle & Wright completed the church proper in 1915. NRHP-listed.
- 1901 – Webster Memorial Guild House of S. Stephen's Church, 114 George St, Providence, Rhode Island
  - A contributing resource to the NRHP-listed College Hill Historic District.
- 1903 – Central Fire Station, Exchange and Washington Sts, Providence, Rhode Island
  - Demolished to build the John O. Pastore Federal Building.
- 1903 – Receiving tomb, North Burial Ground, Providence, Rhode Island
  - A contributing resource to the NRHP-listed North Burial Ground historic district.
- 1903 – Shepard Company Building, 225 Westminster St, Providence, Rhode Island
  - NRHP-listed, also a contributing resource to the NRHP-listed Downtown Providence Historic District.
- 1904 – Irons & Russell Building, 95 Chestnut St, Providence, Rhode Island
  - A contributing resource to the NRHP-listed Providence Jewelry Manufacturing Historic District.
- 1906 – Frederick S. Peck house, Belton Court, 33 Middle Hwy, Barrington, Rhode Island
  - Hall completed major additions, more than tripling the size of the mansion, in 1928. NRHP-listed.
- 1909 – Esmond School (former), 50 Esmond St, Esmond, Rhode Island
  - Now home to the East Smithfield Public Library.
- 1910 – Providence City Hospital (former), 151 Eaton St, Providence, Rhode Island
  - Later known as the Charles V. Chapin Hospital and now incorporated into the campus of Providence College.
- 1911 – St. Stephen's Episcopal Church, 401 S Crockett St, Sherman, Texas
- 1912 – Kinsley Building, 330 Westminster St, Providence, Rhode Island
  - A contributing resource to the NRHP-listed Downtown Providence Historic District.
- 1912 – Reception Hospital, Eleanor Slater Hospital, Cranston, Rhode Island
  - Demolished.
- 1912 – Edwin A. Smith Building, 1 Fulton St, Providence, Rhode Island
  - A contributing resource to the NRHP-listed Downtown Providence Historic District.
- 1913 – Public toilet, Weybosset and Mathewson Sts, Providence, Rhode Island
  - A contributing resource to the NRHP-listed Downtown Providence Historic District.
- 1914 – St. Mary's Episcopal Church parish house, 81 Warren Ave, East Providence, Rhode Island
  - NRHP-listed.
- 1914 – St. Paul's Chapel, 593 Smith St, Providence, Rhode Island
  - Demolished.
- 1914 – Trolley shelter and public toilet (former), Kennedy Plaza, Providence, Rhode Island
  - Now incorporated into the Kennedy Plaza Intermodal Transportation Center. A contributing resource to the NRHP-listed Downtown Providence Historic District.
- 1915 – Blanding Free Public Library and Goff Memorial Hall, 124 Bay State Rd, Rehoboth, Massachusetts
  - A contributing resource to the NRHP-listed Rehoboth Village Historic District.
- 1916 – Kate Lane Richardson house, Yellow Patch, 115 Central St, Narragansett Pier, Rhode Island
  - A contributing resource to the NRHP-listed Central Street Historic District.
- 1917 – Kennedy Building, 142 Main St, Brockton, Massachusetts
- 1917 – Leander R. Peck School, 281 County Rd, Barrington, Rhode Island
  - A contributing resource to the NRHP-listed Barrington Civic Center Historic District.
- 1920 – Providence Art Club addition, 11 Thomas St, Providence, Rhode Island
  - Hall added the bridge connecting the club's buildings at 10 and 11 Thomas Street and renovated 10 Thomas Street for club purposes. A contributing resource to the NRHP-listed College Hill Historic District.
- 1924 – Rhode Island Maximum Security Prison additions, 1375 Pontiac Ave, Cranston, Rhode Island
  - By 1894 the prison was severely overcrowded, and Martin & Hall prepared plans for new jail for Providence County in 1896. The state appropriation was revoked while bids were being solicited and the original project was abandoned.
- 1927 – William H. Hall Free Library, 1825 Broad St, Cranston, Rhode Island
  - Hall was not related to the donor of this building.
- 1928 – Industrial Trust Building, 111 Westminster St, Providence, Rhode Island
  - Designed by Walker & Gillette, architects, with George Frederic Hall, associate architect. A contributing resource to the NRHP-listed Downtown Providence Historic District.
- 1928 – Union Trust Company Building addition, 170 Westminster St, Providence, Rhode Island
  - A contributing resource to the NRHP-listed Downtown Providence Historic District.

== Additional Links ==
- Central Fire Station
