= Roger Williams Park Museum of Natural History and Planetarium =

Coordinates: 41.78682°N 71.41322°W

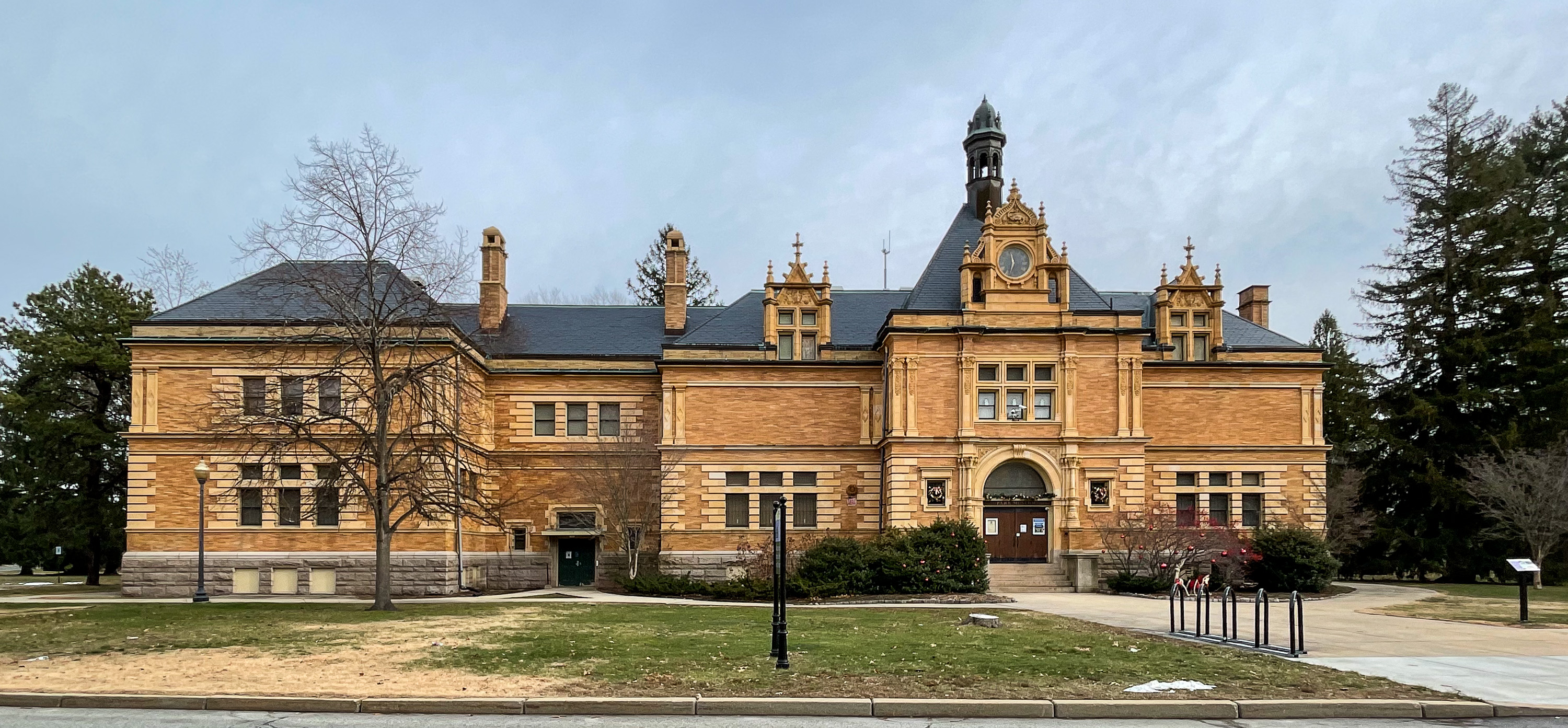
- Museum of Natural History
- Architect: Martin & Hall
- Website: Official website

Roger Williams Park Museum of Natural History and Planetarium is a natural history museum and planetarium within Roger Williams Park in Providence, Rhode Island.

== History ==
The park and museum are named after Roger Williams, the founder of Providence, Rhode Island, and are located on land donated by Williams family. The museum is part of the Providence Parks. It was founded in 1896. The building was designed in late 1893 by Martin & Hall, with construction by Gilbane Building Company beginning the following year. in 1914-15 a northern wing was added, also to the designs of Martin & Hall. Maribelle Cormack established the planetarium in 1953 while museum director and it has since been named the Cormack Planetarium.

== Exhibits ==
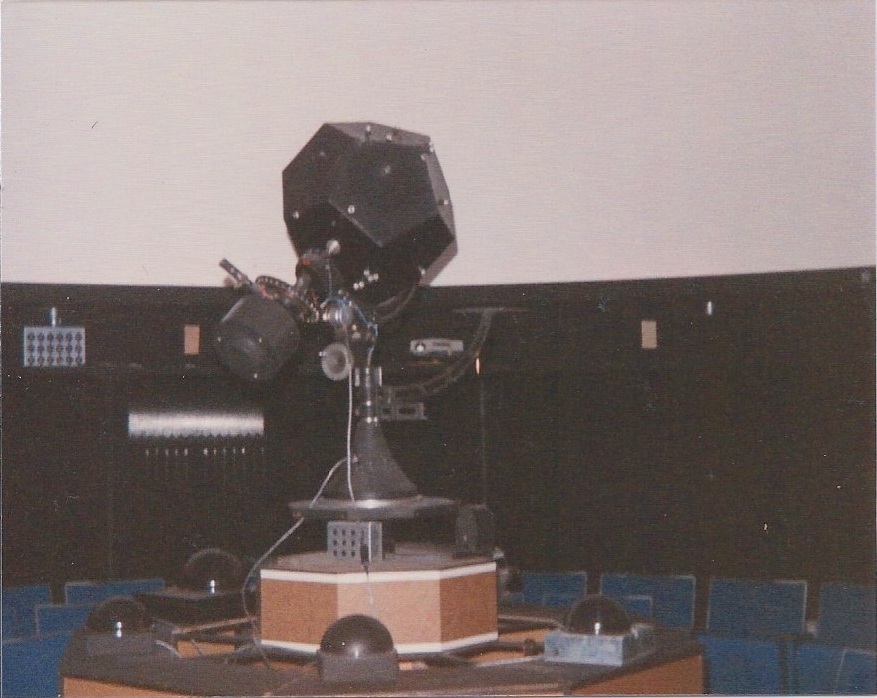
Star projector in the planetarium.

- Circle of the Sea: Re-Visited and Re-Imagined - The South Pacific Ocean.
- Seismic Shifts: Earth through Time - The museum's collections.
- Urban Wildlife: Nature at Your Doorstep - Urban wildlife
- Seismic Shifts: Earth through Time

The Cormack Planetarium offers regular showings.
