= Squantum Association =

- U.S. National Register of Historic Places
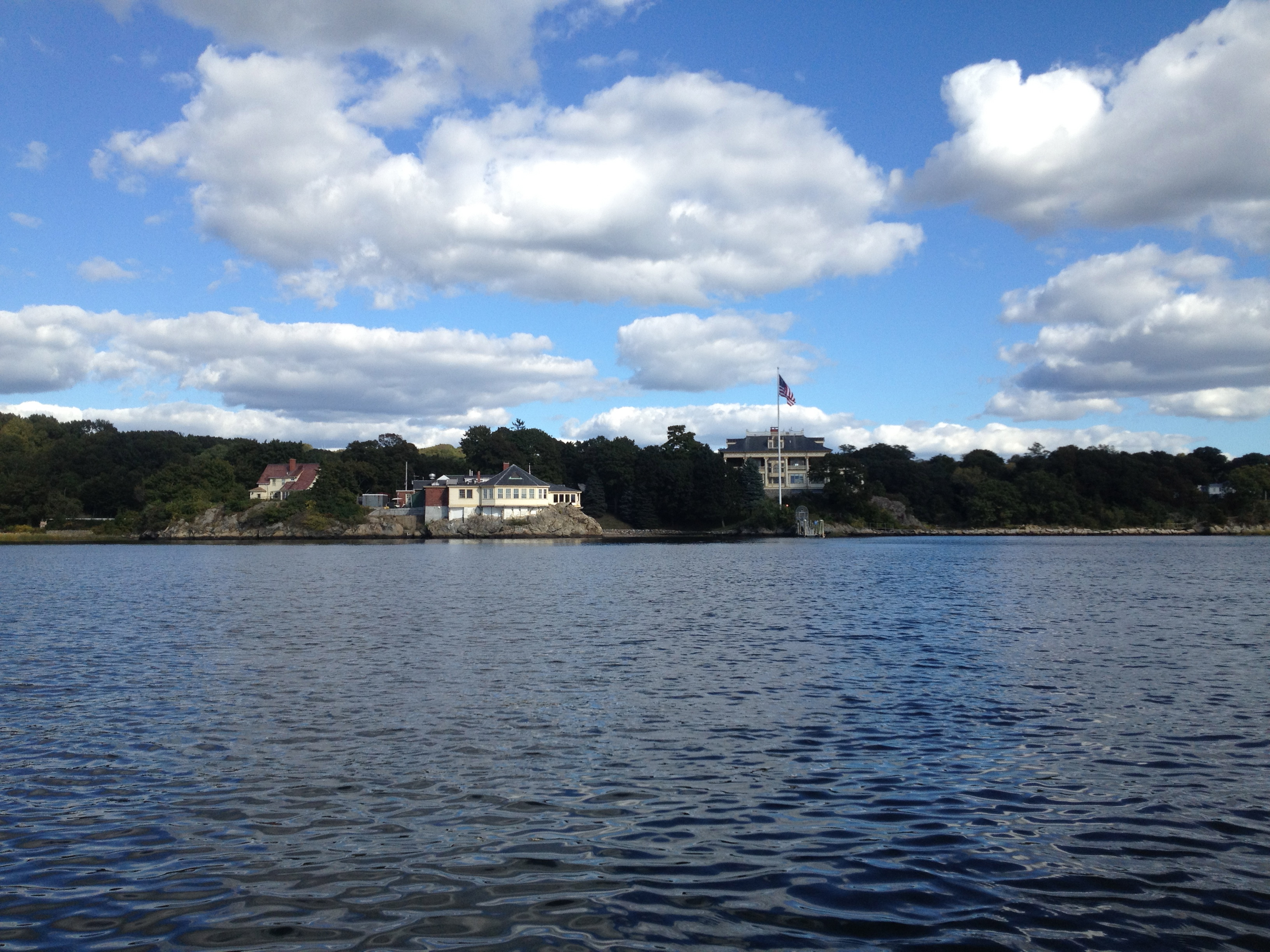

- Location within Rhode Island Location within the United States
- Location: East Providence, Rhode Island
- Coordinates: 41°47′24″N 71°22′25″W
- Area: 2.75 acres (1.11 ha)
- Built: 1870
- Architect: Martin & Hall
- Architectural style: Colonial Revival
- MPS: East Providence MRA
- NRHP reference No.: 80000010
- Added to NRHP: November 28, 1980

The Squantum Association is a private club in East Providence, Rhode Island on 947 Veterans Memorial Parkway. Its main Club House overlooks the Providence River on a rocky promontory. This Colonial Revival building was constructed in 1900 by Martin & Hall and added to the National Register of Historic Places in 1980. The brick bakehouse was built in 1899 and has weathered numerous hurricanes from its lofty perch right on the rocky coast. The "Cottage" is the oldest building on the property and was originally built as a billiard hall. Also surviving from the 19th century is the club office, formerly the manager's residence.

== History ==
As with Squantum Point in Quincy, Massachusetts, Squantum Point in Riverside was named in honor of the influential and welcoming Native American, Squanto, who was a guide and translator for the Mayflower settlers in Plymouth, Massachusetts. Squantum Point in Quincy was so-named for him in the 18th century. Additional indigenous names were given to prominent points in Rhode Island such as Nayatt Point in Barrington, Conimicut Point in Warwick and Watchemoket Cove in East Providence.

In 1870, two groups of local men purchased Squantum Point to serve as a gathering spot to perfect their clambake. In the two decades prior to this purchase, Providence merchants and sea captains would row and sail from Providence to a small island just south of Squantum Point for their clambakes. When, in time, the island's owner objected, Shubael Cady, the club's first president, purchased Squantum Point. The island has had various names (Huckleberry Island, Whortleberry Island, but early maps have it named Scopulous Island, which is Greek in origin and means "place of rocks". The Squantum Association purchased the island in 1912, and built the causeway to the island in 1914 and constructed the pagoda on the island in 1916.

The first clubhouse, built in June 1871, was a simple open-framed pavilion. In 1872 the Squantum Association was incorporated and permanent clubhouses were erected with the richness of detail that characterized fine period architecture. The large current club house is the third.

The Main Club House, built in 1900 overlooking the entrance to the Providence River, features ornate woodwork, polished brass, luxuriant drapery, an artisan stone foundation and a sunroom with southerly views of the bay. The Bakehouse was built out over the rocky coastline in 1889, and provides views of the Providence River and Narragansett Bay.

The membership of the Squantum Association is diverse and has been traditionally drawn from leaders in business, law, medicine, and education from Rhode Island and Massachusetts.

Of note, the small cove to the south and east of the Squantum property and Huckleberry Island is called Windsor Cove. Prior to the train trestle being built by the Providence, Warren & Bristol Railroad, in 1855, this cove had open access to the Providence River. It was from a small shipyard on the north shore of the cove that the first steamship built in America was launched. It was built by Elijah Ormsbee from a whale boat and a large whiskey still he borrowed from friends. Ormsbee sailed it up and down the Providence River into the Seekonk River to Pawtucket for one summer. But as it was very slow (2-3 mph) it was not commercially viable and was dismantled after one summer. The "way", or rail that was used to launch the boat out into the cove is still visible at the neap low tides a couple of times a year. Paul R. Williams, the Squantum Association Club Historian is conducting additional research into this event. Ormsbee's son and grandson later were among the first members of the Squantum Association.

== See also ==
- National Register of Historic Places listings in Providence County, Rhode Island
