= Union Trust Company Building (Providence, Rhode Island) =

- U.S. National Register of Historic Places
- U.S. Historic district – Contributing property
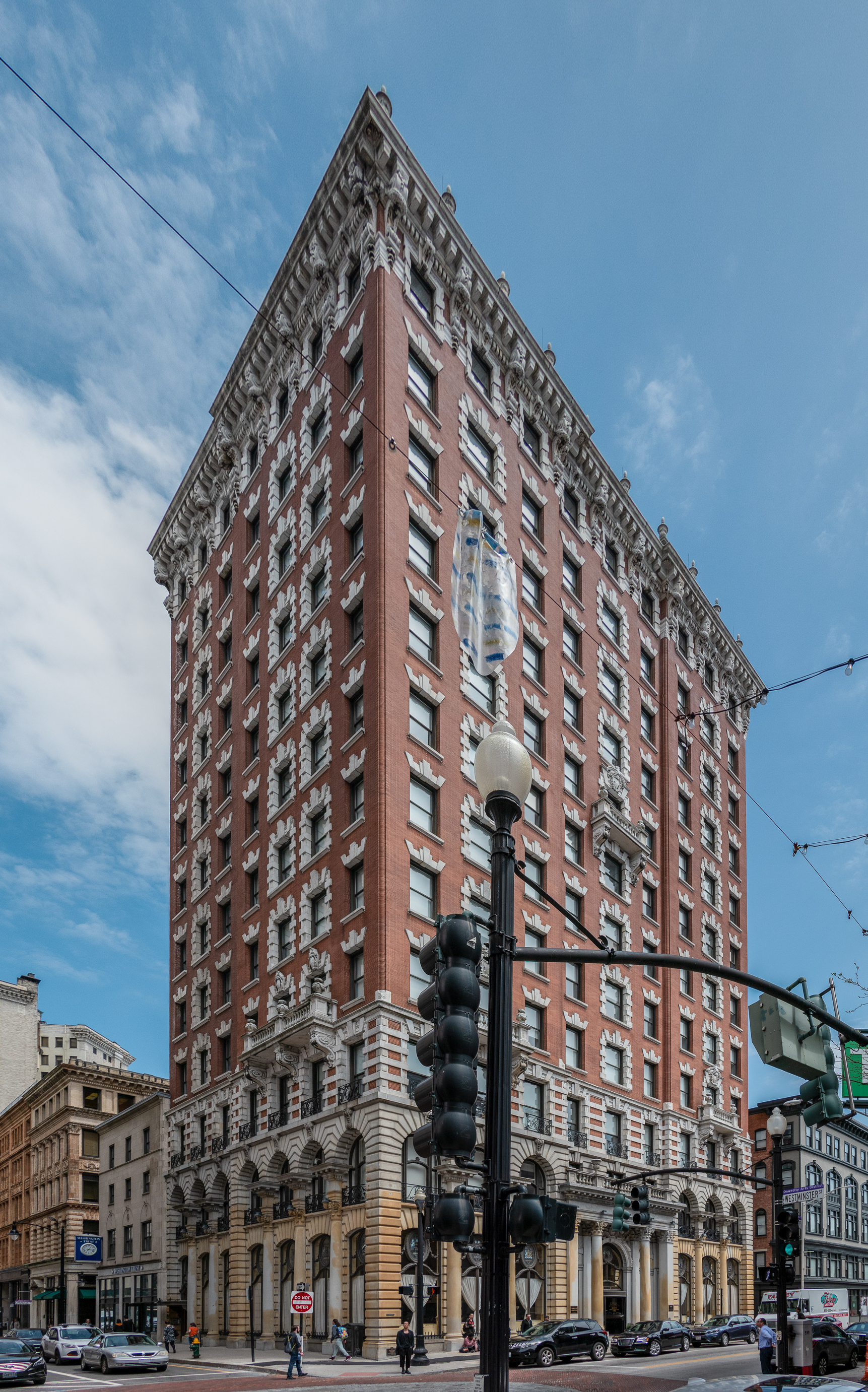

- Location within Rhode Island Location within the United States
- Location: Providence, Rhode Island
- Coordinates: 41°49′24″N 71°24′42″W
- Built: 1901
- Architect: Stone, Carpenter & Willson; George Frederic Hall
- Architectural style: Classical Revival
- Part of: Downtown Providence Historic District (ID84001967)
- NRHP reference No.: 73000004

Significant dates
- Added to NRHP: March 1, 1973
- Designated CP: February 10, 1984

The Union Trust Company Building is a historic building at 170 Westminster Street and 62 Dorrance Street in downtown Providence, Rhode Island. Built as the headquarters of the bank of the same name, it is now occupied primarily by apartments and is known as the G Reserve.

== Union Trust Company ==
The predecessor of the Union Trust Company was the Bank of America, organized in 1851. The early presidents of the bank were Adnah Sackett and Zechariah Chafee. In 1889 Chafee was succeeded by William S. Hayward, a director of the bank since 1872. Hayward and director Marsden J. Perry then embarked on a period of aggressive expansion. The bank was renamed the Bank of America Loan and Trust Company in 1890 and the Union Trust Company in 1894. In 1900 Perry succeeded Hayward as president, and in 1901 he inaugurated the bank's new building. Perry was a monopolist and rapidly consolidated several other Providence banks into his own. The Panic of 1907 revealed that the bank was overextended, causing its temporary closure and the resignation of Perry.

In 1950 the bank merged with the Providence National Bank to form the Providence Union National Bank. In 1953 the bank merged with the Industrial Trust Company to form the Industrial National Bank. This combined bank was the largest in the state.

== History ==
The Union Trust Company Building was completed in 1901 as a twelve-story, four-bay skyscraper. It was designed by architect Walter G. Sheldon of Stone, Carpenter & Willson at the direction of Marsden J. Perry. The first floor and basement were reserved for the bank with the remainder for lease. Notable original tenants of the building included the Narragansett Electric Company (another Perry-controlled company), the General Fire Extinguisher Company (predecessor of SimplexGrinnell), lawyers Edwards & Angell (predecessor of Edwards Wildman Palmer) and architects Martin & Hall. Perry's private offices were located on the twelfth floor. The main banking hall at the base of the building was not completed until 1902. This room and its windows were designed by Clarence Sumner Luce of New York City.

Not long after the building was completed expansions were considered. In August 1907, shortly before the panic, preliminary plans were revealed for a major addition which would extend the building to Orange Street and more than triple it in size. Sheldon was again the architect and completion was estimated for 1909. The panic quickly caused these plans to be canceled. Sheldon did complete some alterations in 1918. Ultimately expansion was not undertaken until 1928, when the building was extended by three bays down Westminster Street. The expansion was designed by architect George Frederic Hall, an original tenant.

After the bank's mergers, most operations were consolidated at other locations and all upper floors were leased to tenants. The banking hall in this building was, however, retained as the home of the combined bank's trust department. In 1964 it was remodeled to serve as the primary retail branch of the Industrial National Bank, with trust operations relocated to the main Industrial National Bank Building. The building was listed on the National Register of Historic Places in 1973. In 1977 the branch was closed and briefly used as a waiting room for vanpool commuters. It returned to banking uses in 1980 when the Greater Providence Deposit Corporation moved in, and in 1981 the building was substantially restored. This bank was closed during the Rhode Island banking crisis and did not reopen after its assets were acquired by the Northeast Federal Corporation of Hartford, Connecticut. Since 1996 the banking hall has been occupied by a series of restaurants. The first of these, "The Federal Reserve," was short-lived but has lent its name to the building.

In 2016, a New York developer signed a contract for $2.5 million in state historic preservation tax credits. The developer planned to "convert the building to a mix of business and restaurant on the first two floors and rooftop, and apartment use on all other floors." The project was completed in 2019 to designs by architects Studio MEJA, now SignalWorks, and is named the G Reserve, for the building's common name and for the nearby Providence G complex with which it is associated.

== Description ==
It is a twelve-story steel-framed structure, faced in brick and stone. The exterior of the first two floors is treated differently than the upper floors, with a tall first floor whose windows are separated by stone pilasters, and heavily quoined corners. Above the entrance to the banking hall on Dorrance Street are two sculptures, Indian and Puritan, by Daniel Chester French. The two figures recline against the frame of the entrance, not unlike Michelangelo's Night and Day in the side tomb of the Sagrestia Nuova. The second floor windows are set within round-arch openings with elaborate keystones. The upper levels are finished predominantly in brick, with marble trim; the third story receives a somewhat more elaborate treatment. The first floor banking hall is noted for its particularly sumptuous decoration.

== Gallery ==
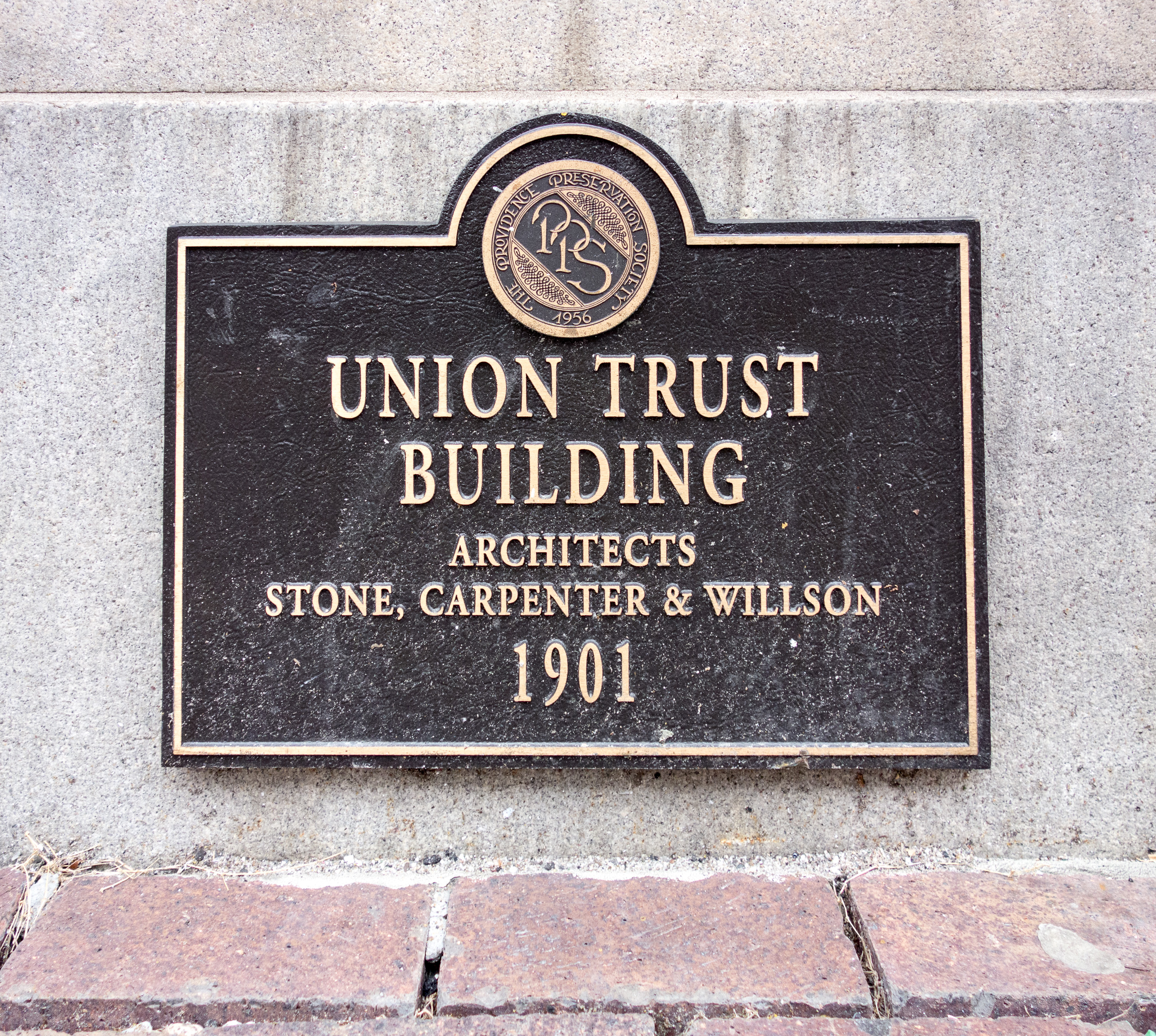
A plaque affixed by the Providence Preservation Society

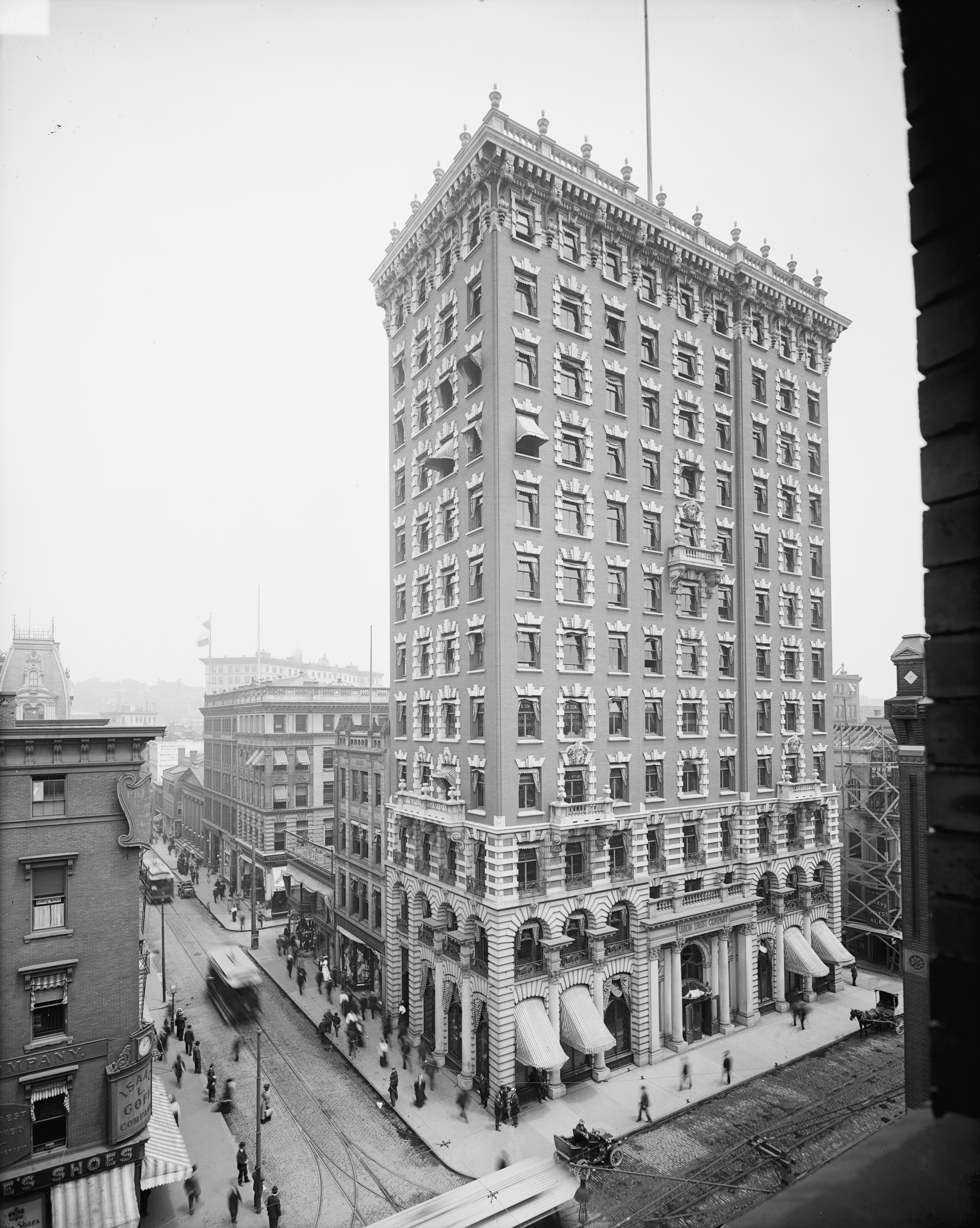
The building in 1906, prior to the addition of three bays.

== See also ==
- National Register of Historic Places listings in Providence, Rhode Island
