= Maribelle Cormack =

American author (1902–1984)

- Born: 1902; Buffalo, New York
- Died: 1984 (aged 81–82)
- Education: Cornell University, Brown University, Rhode Island College
- Occupations: Museum director, author
- Years active: 1923–1972
- Organization: Roger Williams Park Museum of Natural History

Maribelle Cormack (1902–1984) was an American museum director, planetarium director, and author. She established the planetarium at the Roger Williams Park Museum of Natural History in Providence, Rhode Island, which has since been named the Cormack Planetarium in her honor.

== Early life and education ==
Cormack was born in Buffalo, New York in 1902. She received her bachelor's degree in English literature from Cornell University in 1923. After graduating, she assumed a teaching position at the Buffalo Science Museum for two years. Then, she conducted graduate research abroad at the University of Vienna and the University of Geneva, finally receiving her master's degree in botany from Brown University. She also engaged in research at the Bishop Museum in Hawaii.

In 1966, Cormack received an honorary doctorate from Rhode Island College, for her continued involvement at the Roger Williams Park Museum of Natural History.

== Career ==
Cormack had been involved with the Roger Williams Park Museum of Natural history since 1927. She often taught after school lessons and created interpretive content and theater intended for children of all ages. In 1947, she accepted the position as the Museum's director. As director, she facilitated the opening of the Museum's planetarium in 1953. After 25 years of service as director, she retired in 1972.

In addition to her work at the Museum, Cormack was also a prolific writer. She wrote at least 20 books over the course of her career. Many of these books were intended for younger audiences, however she also wrote nonfiction intended for adults. Her books spanned topics such as nature, history, and museology.

== Legacy ==
Providence's planetarium was named after Cormack, and despite renovations, it still maintains her name to this day.

In 2020, the Rhode Island Council for Humanities awarded a $2,000 grant to fund an exhibition series on Cormack at Roger Williams’ Park Museum of Natural History and Planetarium.

== Bibliography ==
The following is a partial list of books authored or co-authored by Maribelle Cormack:

- Cormack, Maribelle; Alexander, William (1931). The Museum Comes to Life.
- Cormack, Maribelle (1935). Runner of the Trail: A Mystery of the Hudson Bay Country.
- Cormack, Maribelle (1937). Wind of the Vikings: A Tale of the Orkney Isles.
- Cormack, Maribelle (1938). Jacques the Goatherd: a Story of the High Alps.
- Cormack, Maribelle (1938). Bruce and Marcia, Woodsmen.
- Cormack, Maribelle; Alexander, William (1939). Land for My Sons: A Frontier Tale of the American Revolution.
- Cormack, Maribelle; Alexander, William (1940). Last Clash of Claymores: A story of Scotland in the time of Prince Charles.
- Cormack, Maribelle; Alexander, William (1941). The Luck of the Comstocks: The Story of Block Island.
- Cormack, Maribelle (1942). Harper, Wilhelmina (ed.). Wings of Courage and Other Stories for Girl Scouts.
- Cormack, Maribelle (1943). A Recruit for Abe Lincoln.
- Cormack, Maribelle (1944). Road to Down Under.
- Cormack, Maribelle (1946). Underground Retreat.
- Cormack, Maribelle; Bytovetzski, P.L. (1948). Swamp Boy: A story of the Okefinokee Swamp in Georgia.
- Cormack, Maribelle (1950). The First Book of Stones.
- Cormack, Maribelle (1952). Timber Jack.
- Cormack, Maribelle (1959). The First Book of Trees.
- Cormack, Maribelle (1961). The Star-Crossed Woman.
- Cormack, Maribelle (1961). Stern Unter Segeln. Translated by Organ, Morgan.
- Cormack, Maribelle (1965). Imhotep: Builder in Stone.
