= Shepard Company Building =

Historic building in Providence, Rhode Island, U.S.

- U.S. National Register of Historic Places
- U.S. Historic district – Contributing property
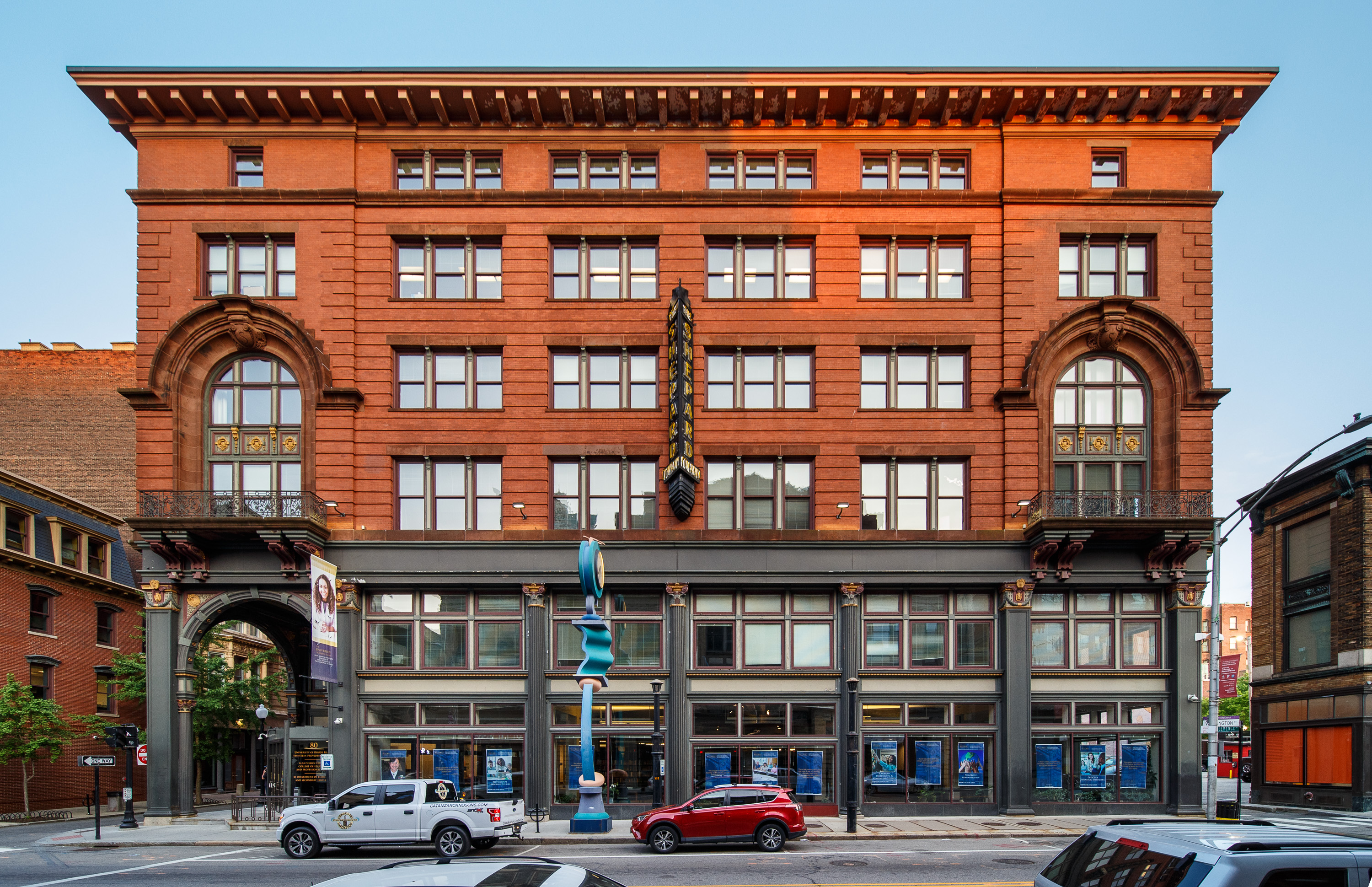
- Washington Street facade

- Location within Rhode Island Location within the United States
- Location: Providence, Rhode Island
- Coordinates: 41°49′24″N 71°24′50″W
- Architect: Martin & Hall, others
- Part of: Downtown Providence Historic District (ID84001967)
- NRHP reference No.: 76000003

Significant dates
- Added to NRHP: August 11, 1976
- Designated CP: February 10, 1984

The Shepard Company Building is a historic building at 255 Westminster Street and 72-92 Washington Street in downtown Providence, Rhode Island. A prominent landmark, it housed Shepard's, Providence's most prestigious department store, and one of the largest in New England, from 1903 to 1974, beginning as a single building built in the 1870s at Clemence and Washington and continually expanding until it occupied the entire block between Westminster, Clemence, Washington and Union Streets.

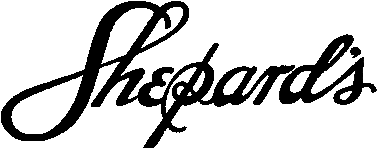
Shepard's department store logo

After Shephard's closed, the building stood vacant for almost 20 years, until the Providence Preservation Society organized a charrette to determine the building's future. As a result, the building was bought by the State of Rhode Island, and is now the location of the Providence Campus of the University of Rhode Island, the Rhode Island Department of Education, and other state offices and education-related facilities.

== History ==
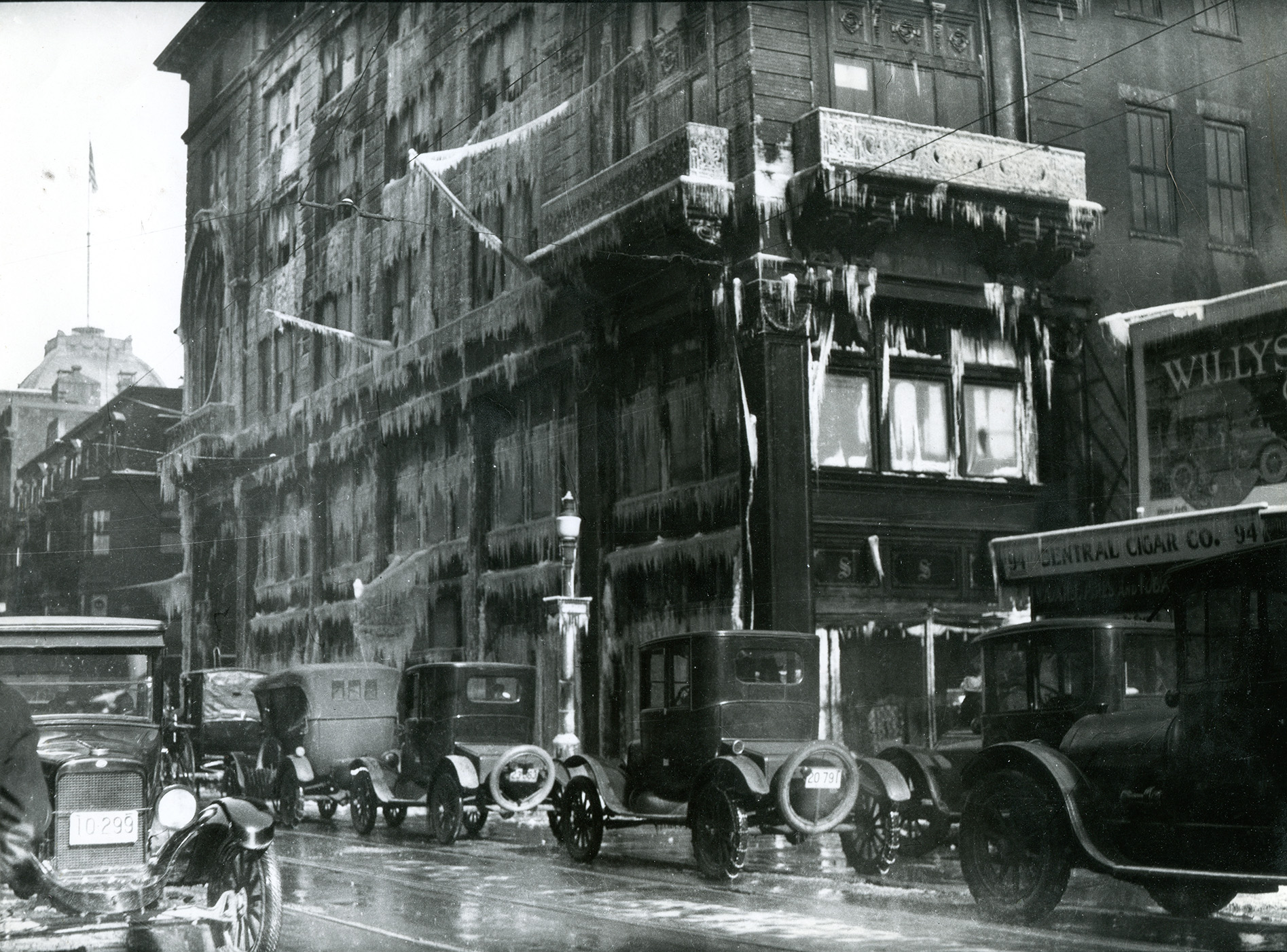
The building following a 1923 fire.

The building grew in stages, starting as a modest three-story Italianate structure at the corner of Clemence and Washington in 1880. Beginning in 1896 the company embarked on a rapid expansion, designed by Martin & Hall, which was largely completed by 1903. By 1909, the store boasted of having a restaurant which could serve 4100, a laundry, a refrigerating and ice-making plant, a fur storage room, and a complete printing plant.

The building was struck by fire in March 1923, causing over one million dollars' worth of damage, but rebuilt under Hall's supervision.

The department store's business was hurt by the development of suburbs and shopping malls in the 1960s. In 1973 the store went bankrupt and was purchased by the Eastern Dry Goods Company. A spokesperson for Eastern Dry Goods told The New York Times in September 1973 that the store "will probably have to be liquidated because of their many problems." The store closed for good in 1974. During the next few years the building was leased to various tenants, and was vacant by the early 1990s.

In 1976, the building was listed on the National Register of Historic Places.

In the 1990s the Providence Preservation Society organized a charrette to determine the building's future.

In 1993, it was announced that the landmark building was purchased by the Rhode Island Port Authority for "nearly $2.3 million." The announced plan was to open a history museum on the first two floors, to be operated by the Rhode Island Heritage Center. The remainder of the building would be used as office space for up to 500 state workers, including the state Environmental Management Department, the Council on the Arts, and the Library Services department.

When the University of Rhode Island faced losing the space its Providence Campus was using in the Providence Place mall, it decided to move into the Shepard Company Building. The 1996 rehabilitation and renovation of the building to accommodate the school was designed by David Presbrey, and included another sidewalk clock on Washington Street.

The building is currently owned by the State of Rhode Island and houses not only URI's Alan Feinstein Campus, but also the Rhode Island Department of Education, and other state offices.

== Gallery ==
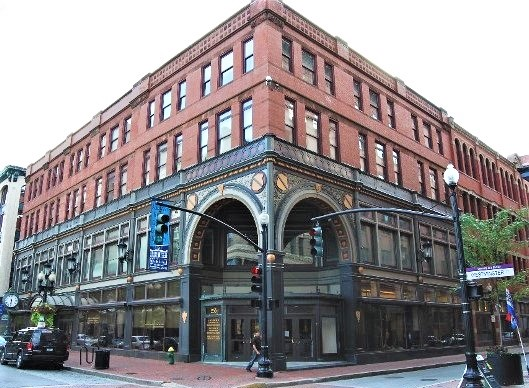
A general view of the building

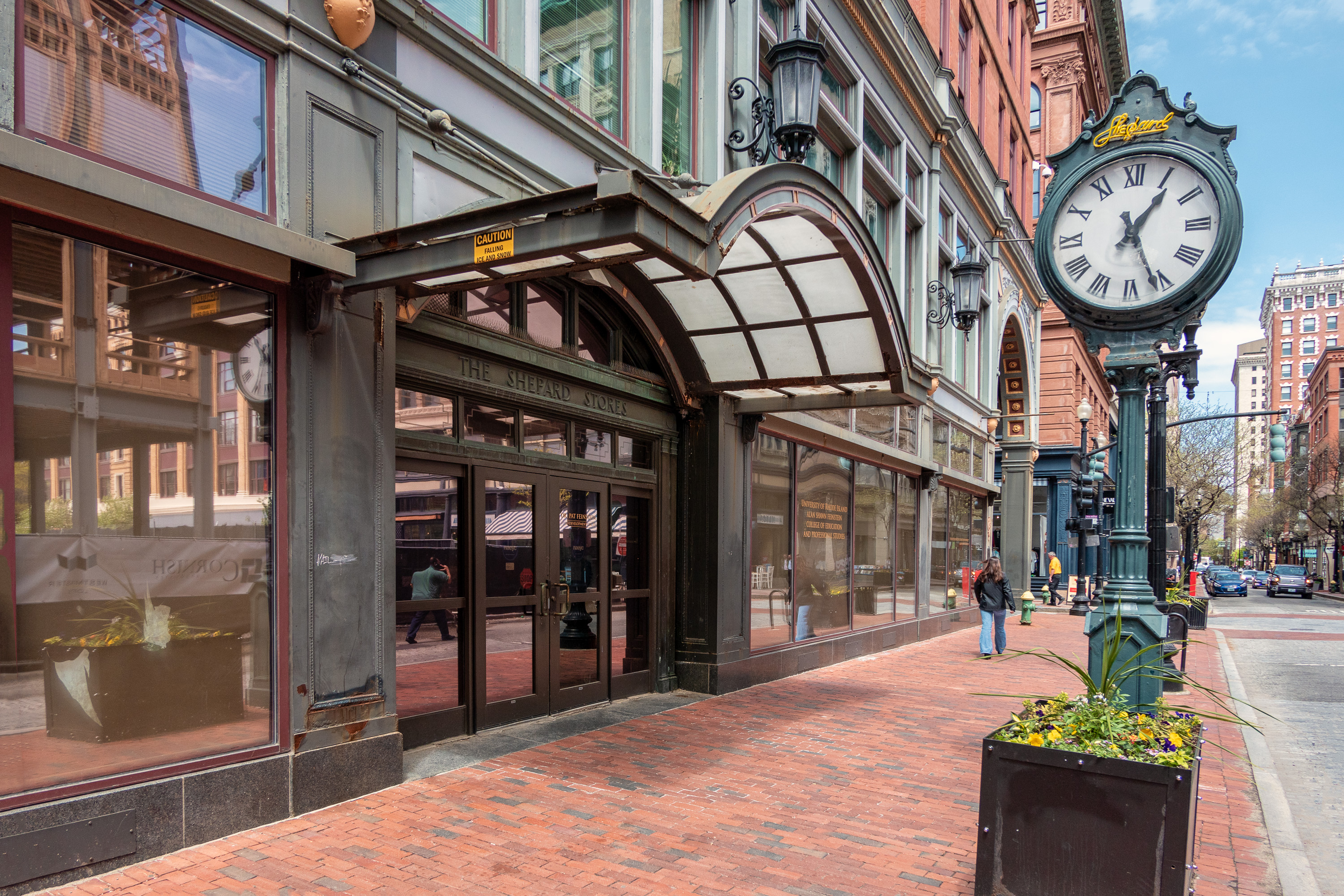
The Westminster Street entrance and clock in 2019

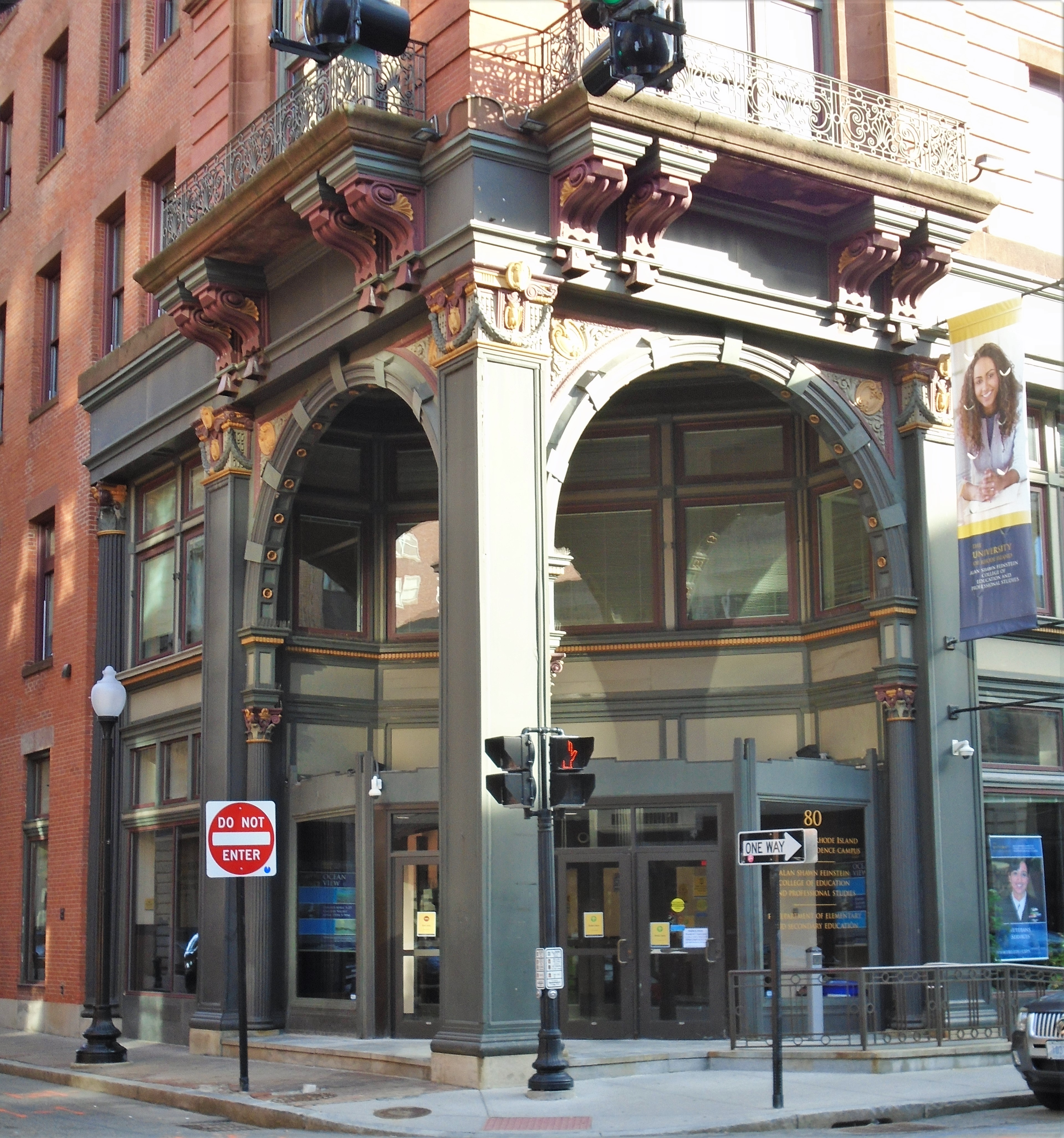
A close-up of the arched entrance at Westminster and Union

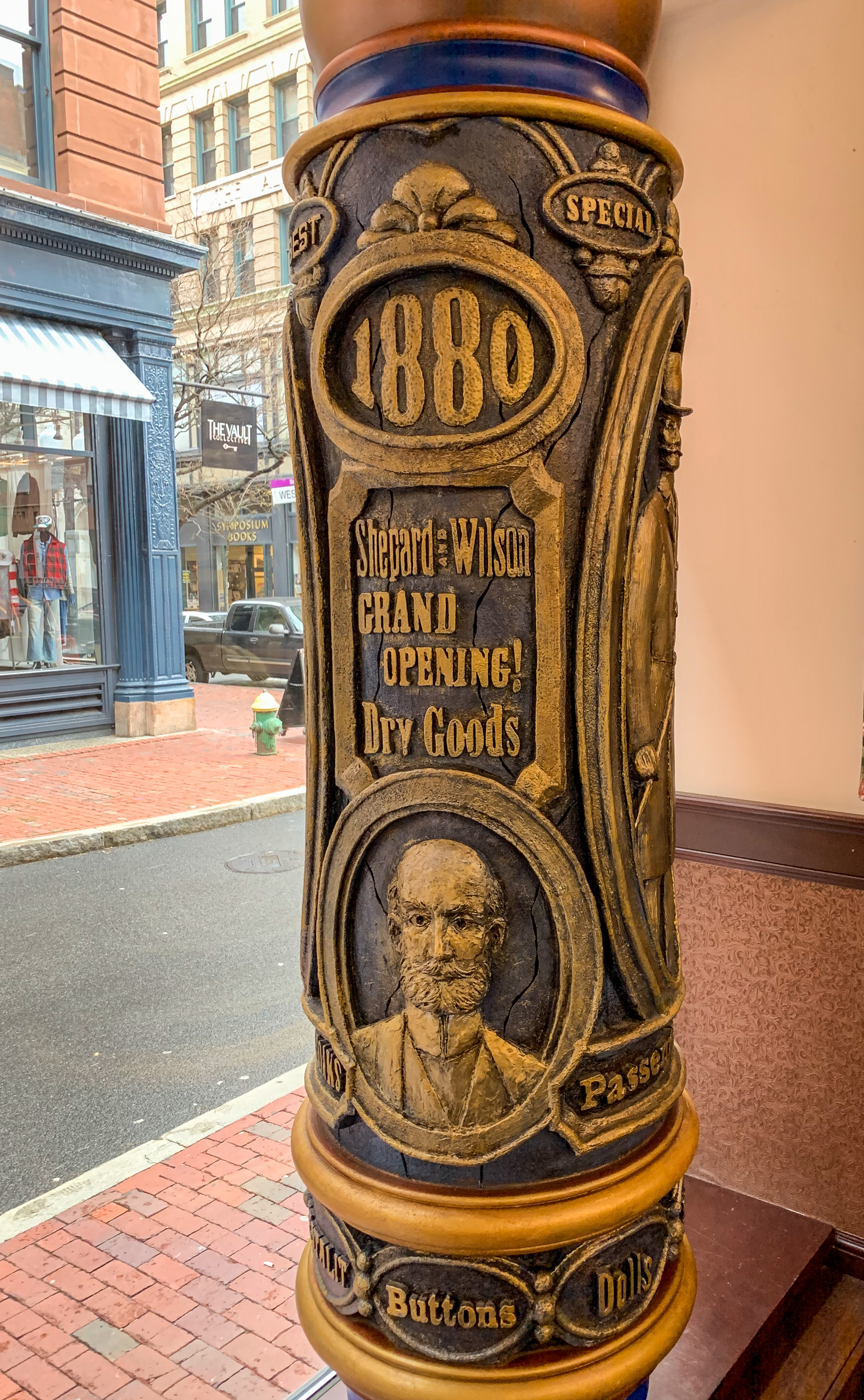
A decorative column

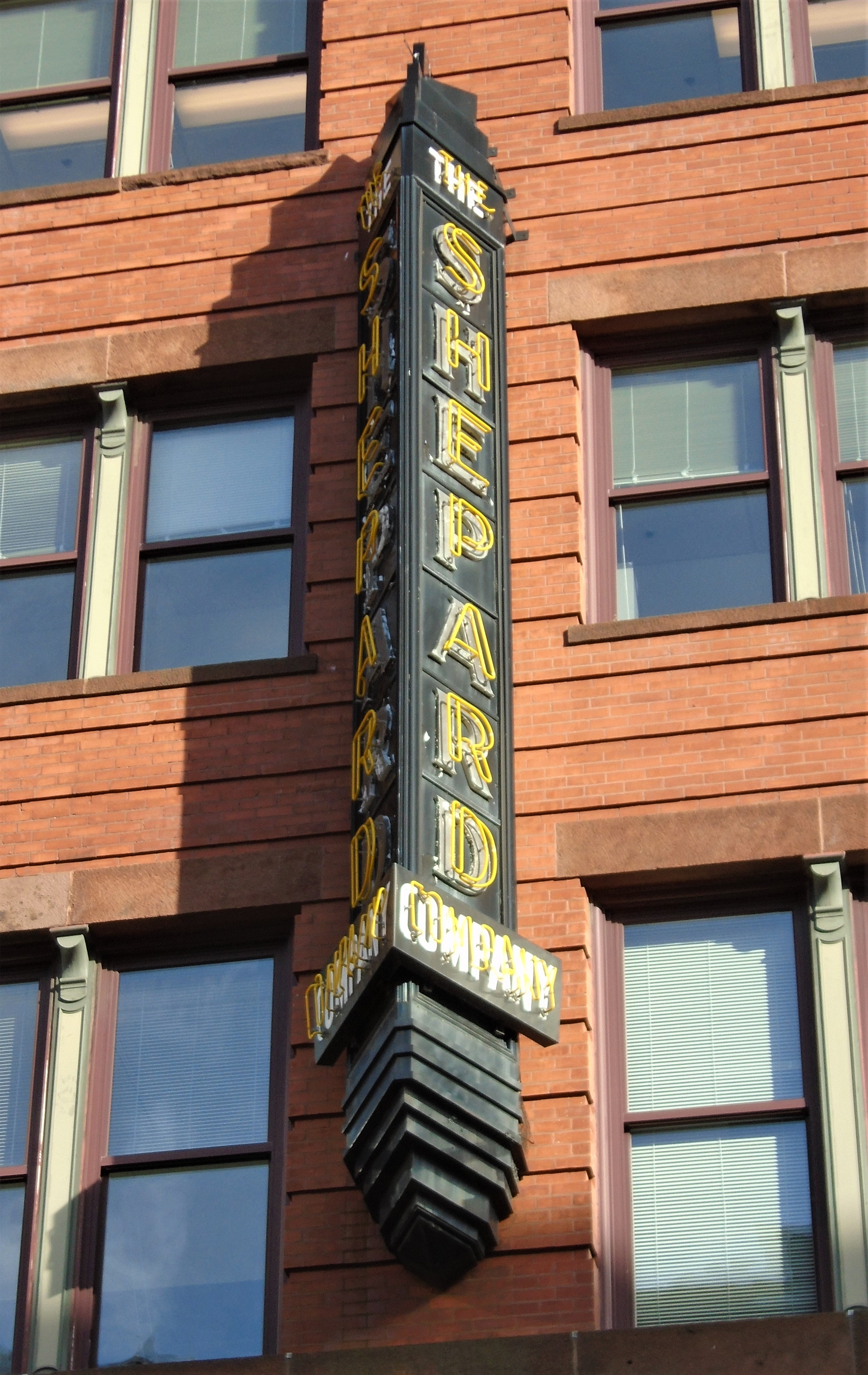
The Shepard sign

== See also ==
- National Register of Historic Places listings in Providence, Rhode Island
