= Rehoboth Village Historic District =

Historic district in Massachusetts, United States

- U.S. National Register of Historic Places
- U.S. Historic district
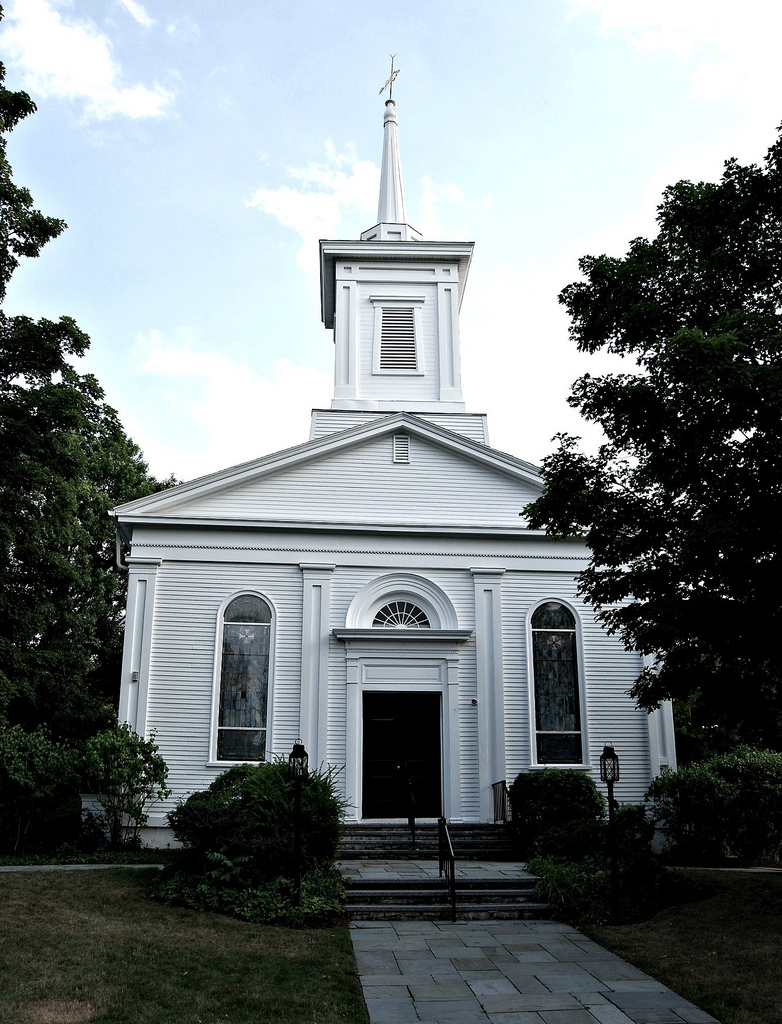

- Location within Massachusetts Location within the United States
- Location: Rehoboth, Massachusetts
- Coordinates: 41°50′26″N 71°15′9″W
- Area: 12 acres (4.9 ha)
- Built: 1700
- Architectural style: Late 19th and 20th Century Revivals, Greek Revival, Late Victorian
- MPS: Rehoboth MRA
- NRHP reference No.: 83000707
- Added to NRHP: June 6, 1983

The Rehoboth Village Historic District is a historic district encompassing the historic rural village center of Rehoboth, Massachusetts. The village grew around an industrial site located on the Palmer River, whose waters powered several mills nearby. A modest rural village grew in the area between about 1750 and 1850, with the current church being built in 1839. Later in the 19th century institutional buildings, including Goff Hall and Blanding Library, were added. The village is centered at the junction of Bay State Road and Locust Street.

The district was listed on the National Register of Historic Places in 1983.

== Goff Memorial Hall and Blanding Library ==
=== Current Uses ===
Located on Baystate Road in Rehoboth, Massachusetts, Goff Memorial Hall, and Blanding Library can be easily accessed from both Routes 44 and 118 North. Currently, a member of the Sails Library Network, this library provides services both to the members of the Rehoboth community and to card-carrying members of other libraries within this network. The building now acts as one of the major cultural heritage institutions found within the historic district.

=== Construction & Design ===
The Goff Memorial Hall and Blanding Library structure are one of the major cultural heritage sites located in the small, agricultural town of Rehoboth, Massachusetts on the state's south shore. First constructed in 1886, the original wooden structure stood as an impressive feat of Victorian age architecture within the heart of the town's Historic District. The idea and funding for this project came from Thomas W. Bicknell who donated several hundred dollars to the town in memory of his wife Amelia's parents, Chloe and Christopher Blanding. For 25 years, Goff Hall acted as almost a proto-community building for Rehoboth with the building including spaces for educational and recreational use.

=== Destruction & Rebuilding Efforts ===
During the summer of 1911, while a storm passed over the town, the original structure was struck by lightning. Since Goff Hall at this time was primarily constructed out of wood, the building was completely lost in the disaster. Subsequently, there was an immediate push by members of the community to rebuild the original site. This resulted in a 4 year-long construction project whose result is the Goff Memorial and Blanding Library building still in use today.

=== References ===
[FEATURED PROJECT] HISTORIC REHOBOTH LIBRARY ADDITION

Sails Library Network

Rehoboth Antiquarian Society

== Gallery ==
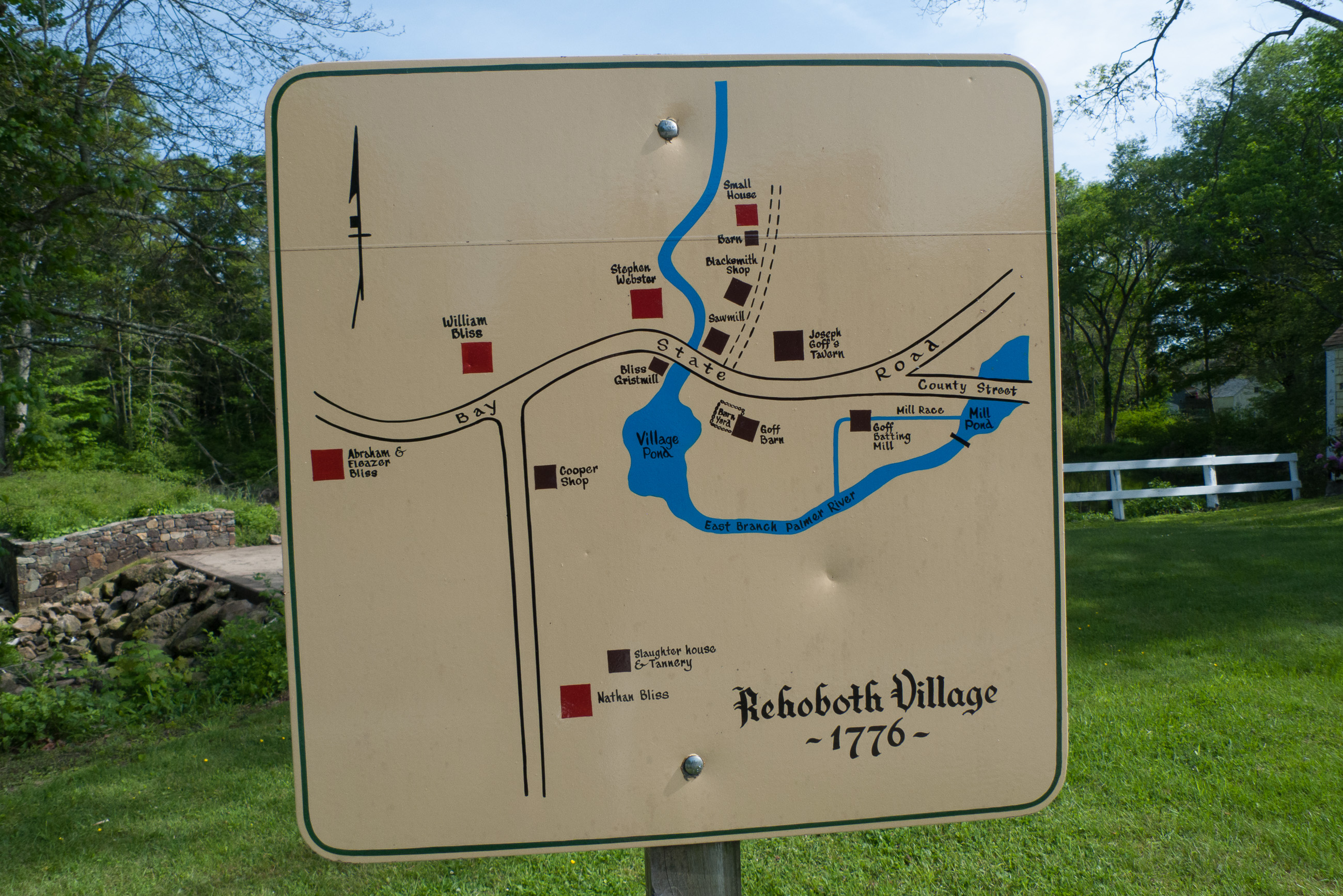
Sign outlining part of the historic district

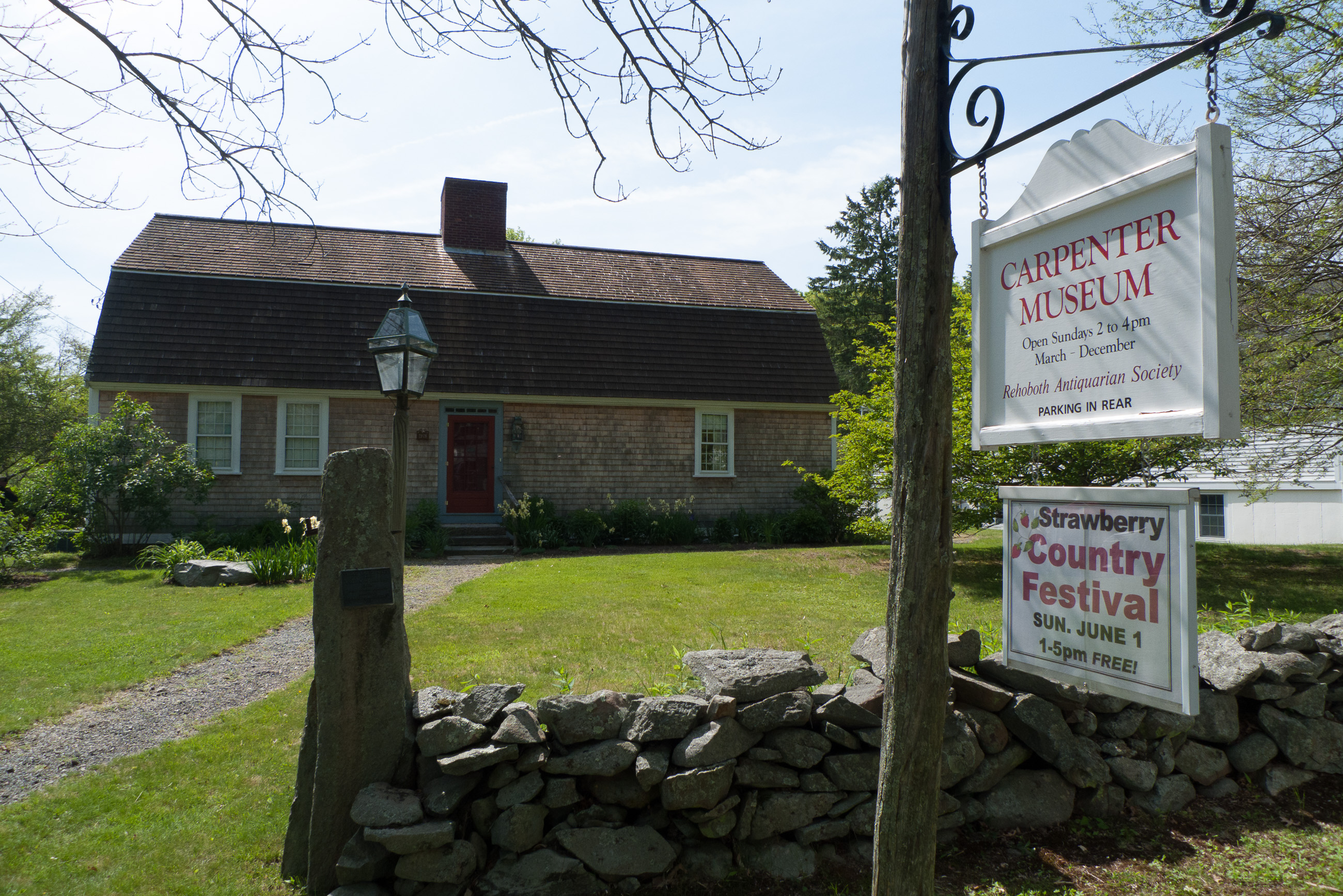
Carpenter Museum at 4 Locust Street

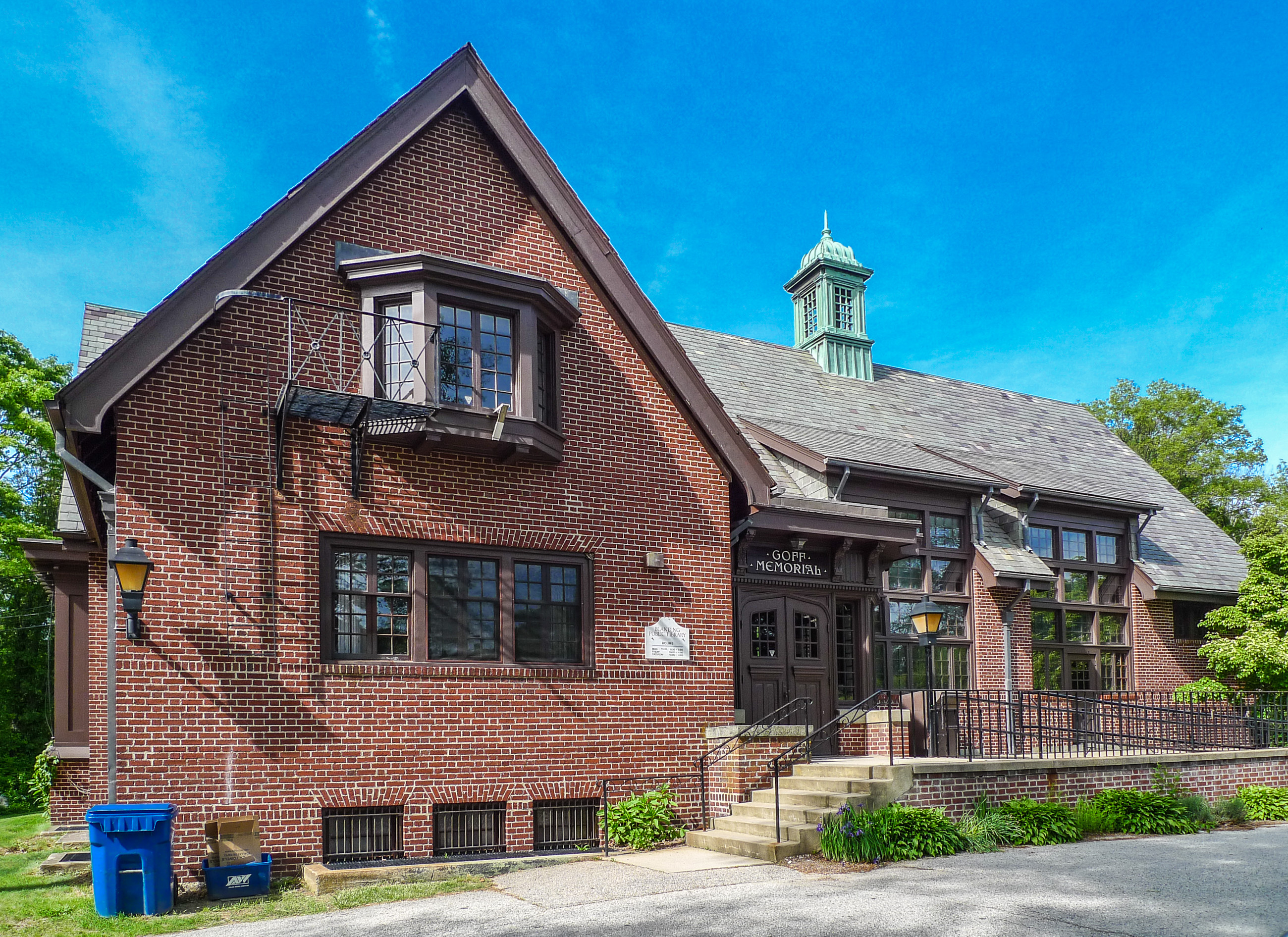
Goff Memorial Hall and Blanding Library

== See also ==
- National Register of Historic Places listings in Bristol County, Massachusetts
