= Wallis Eastburn Howe =

American architect

Wallis E. Howe
- Wallis E. Howe, circa 1930s
- Born: September 12, 1868; Philadelphia
- Died: September 15, 1960 (aged 92); Bristol, Rhode Island
- Occupation: Architect
- Awards: Fellow, American Institute of Architects (1923)
- Practice: Clarke & Howe; Howe & Church; Howe & Prout; Howe, Prout & Ekman

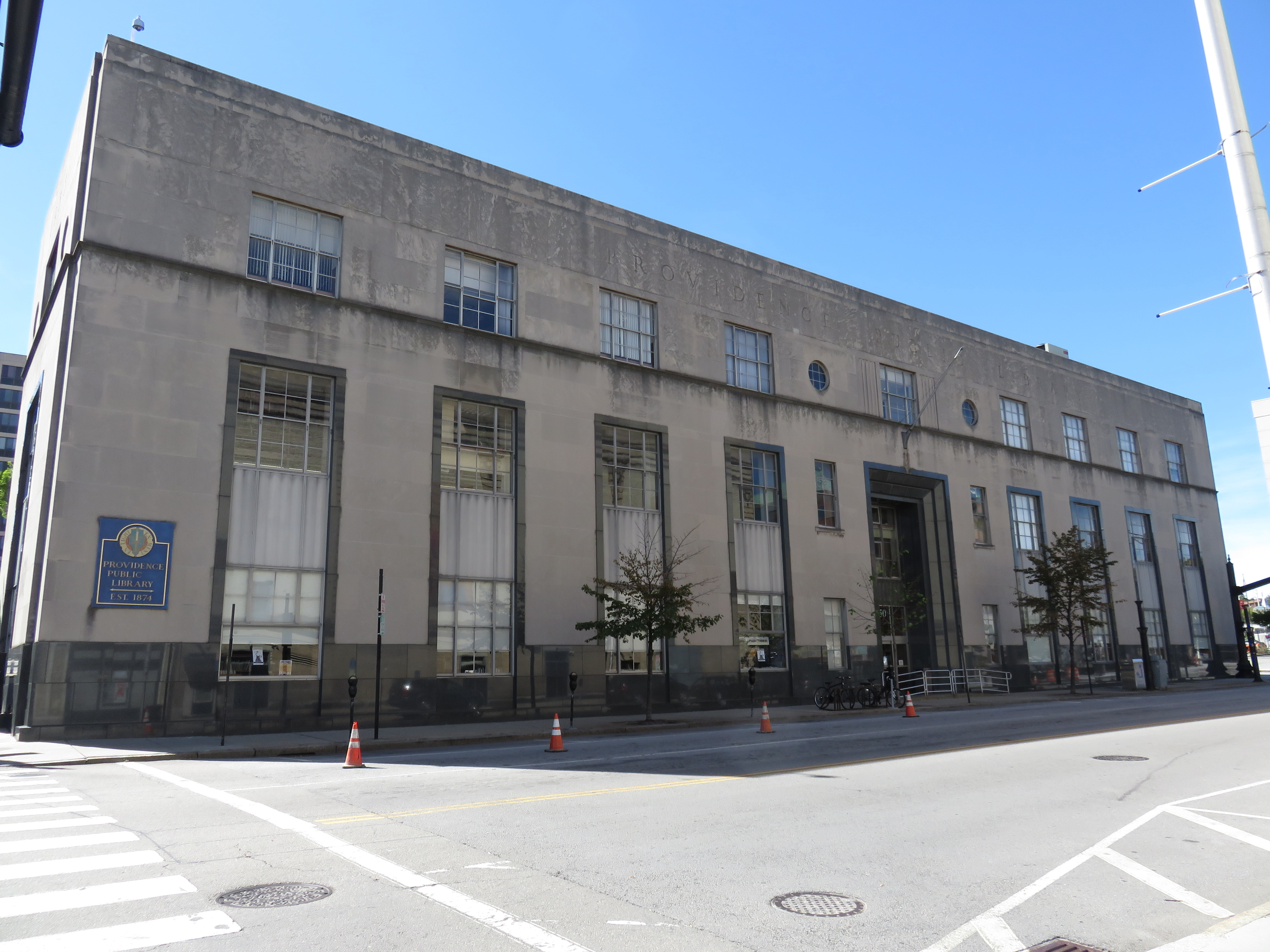
The 1953–54 addition to the Providence Public Library, by Howe, Prout & Ekman.

Wallis Eastburn Howe FAIA (September 12, 1868 – September 15, 1960) was a notable American architect from Rhode Island. Howe became a partner in the Providence architectural firm of Clarke & Howe in 1901 and was senior partner of that firm's successors from 1928 until his death in 1960.

== Biography ==
Howe was born in Philadelphia in 1868 to a family with deep roots in Bristol, Rhode Island. He was the 18th and last child of Mark Antony De Wolfe Howe, a great-great-nephew of James De Wolf. Howe's father began his duties of bishop of the Episcopal Diocese of Central Pennsylvania in January 1872, and moved his family to Reading the following year.

He first attended Reading's Selwyn Hall, the diocesan school. After graduation, he attended Lehigh University ('89) and the Massachusetts Institute of Technology ('92). Howe went to Bristol (and opened an architect's office) by 1894. In about 1896 he joined the office of Providence architects Martin & Hall, though he continued to accept commissions in Bristol. He quickly gained a high level of responsibility in the office, and was given design duties on several projects. He remained with Martin & Hall until 1901, when he joined the office of Clarke & Spaulding. The firm became Clarke, Spaulding & Howe very briefly, but became Clarke & Howe a few months later upon Spaulding's retirement.

Clarke & Howe became one of Rhode Island's leading firms, beginning in 1903, when they won the commission for the U. S. Federal Building in Providence. By the time the building was completed in 1908, they had gained the commissions for many academic and public buildings. Eleazer B. Homer, another MIT alumnus, was partner from 1907 to 1913. Clarke retired in 1928, and the firm became Howe & Church. Samuel W. Church had been with the firm since at least 1908, when his family had the firm design the Benjamin Church Home in Bristol. Church retired in 1938, and Earle F. Prout, the firm's chief draftsman, became partner. In 1946 the partnership was expanded to include Edward O. Ekman, as Howe, Prout & Ekman. Ekman had been an associate with Howe & Church from 1928 to 1931, after which he had opened his own office. Ekman left in 1959, and the firm reverted to Howe & Prout in 1960. Donald J. Prout was substituted for Earle Prout, who died the same year. Howe also died that year, and the firm was succeeded by Donald J. Prout & Associates. Prout was only 29 years old at the time. Prout moved the office to Cranston in 1973, where he lived for the remainder of his life.

Howe was the father of George L. Howe, the architect, author and Office of Strategic Services officer.

== Architectural work ==
=== Private practice, c.1894–1896 ===
Wallis Howe's first known design is the old Bristol Armory of 1894, on Thames Street. It is unknown how he gained the commission, but it was probably through family connections. Howe chose a Romanesque Revival style that gave a medieval flavor to the armories built at that era. In 1895 he designed a house (60 Church) for Frank M. Dimond, and in 1896 one (40 Woodlawn) for Andrew Lynch. Both were comfortably in the Queen Anne mainstream.

=== With Martin & Hall, 1896–1901 ===
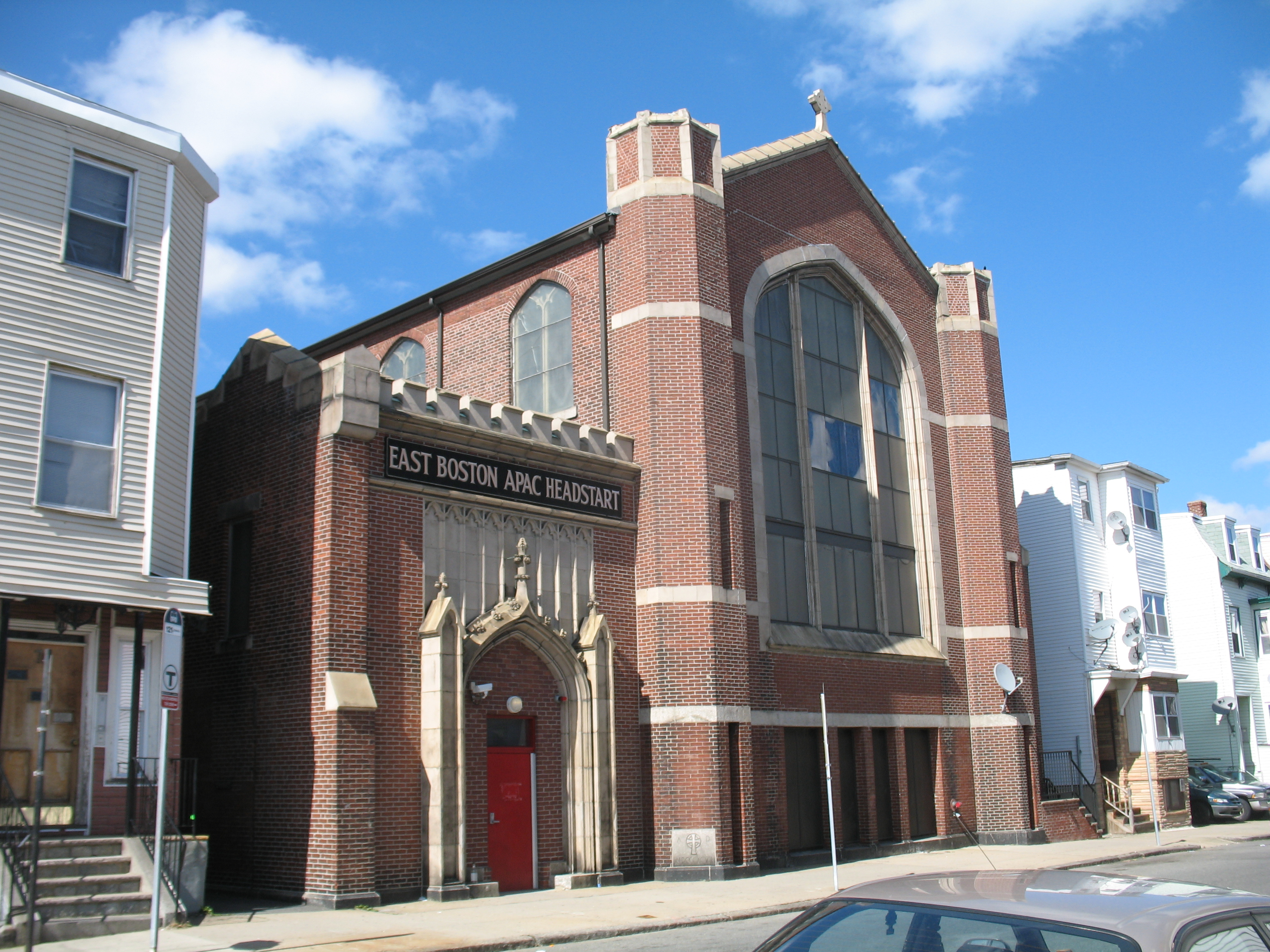
St. John's, East Boston, 1897.

Circa 1896, Howe joined the Providence office of Martin & Hall as a designer where he quickly gained a high level of responsibility. He could act on behalf of the firm, apply for building permits, and execute designs under his own name. He began stewardship for several Martin & Hall buildings in the Bristol area. There, he designed the Y. M. C. A. Building on Hope Street in 1898. The following year he also designed a harborside residence called Wyndstowe, for Isoline and Hattie Barns. Howe later inherited the house, at 221 Hope Street, from the sisters.

- 1896 – Alfred Harrison House, 260 Olney St, Providence, Rhode Island
- 1897 – St. John's Episcopal Church, 80 Lexington St, East Boston, Massachusetts
- 1901 – Walter Hidden House, 150 Meeting St, Providence, Rhode Island

=== Clarke & Howe, 1901–1928 ===
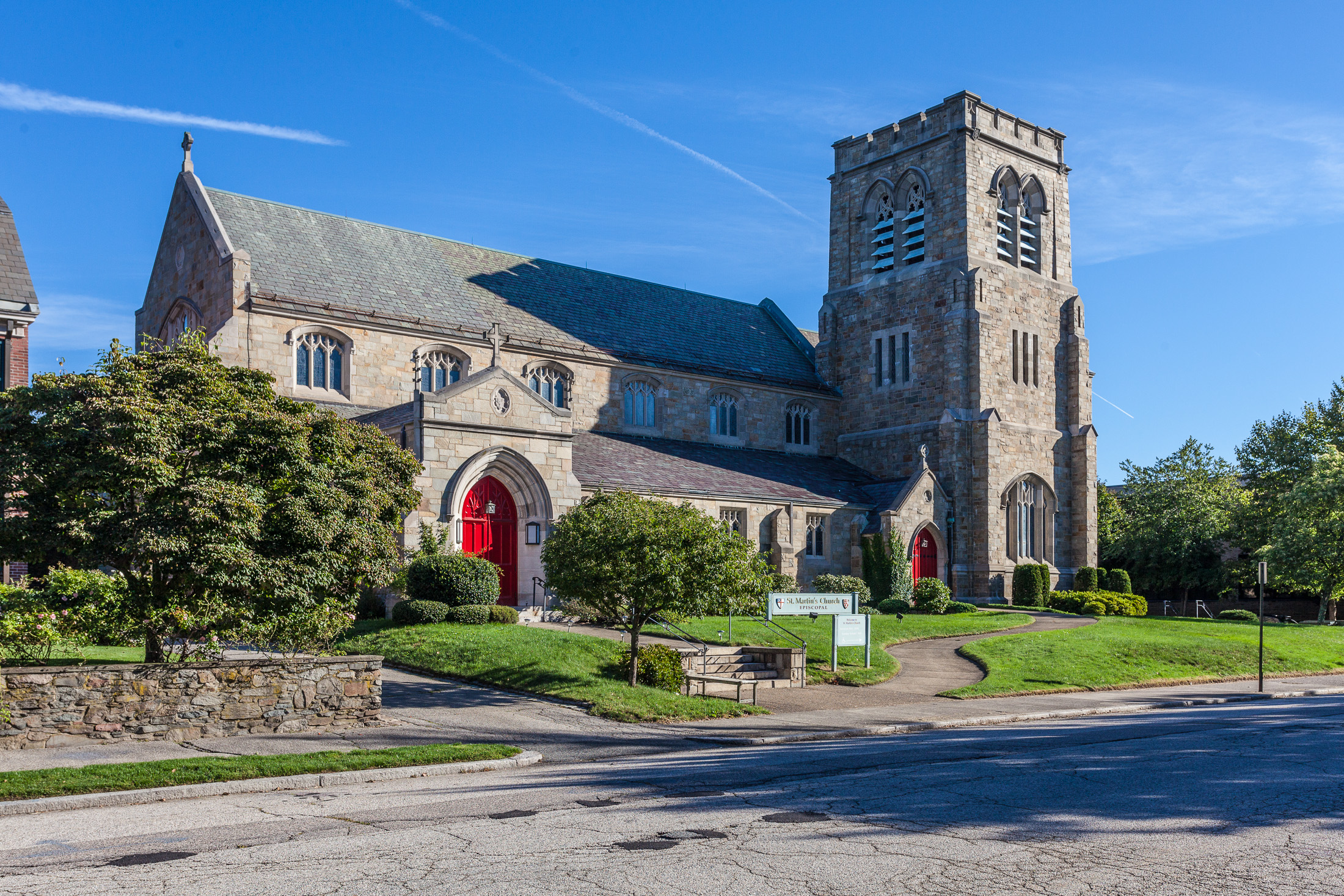
Saint Martin's Church

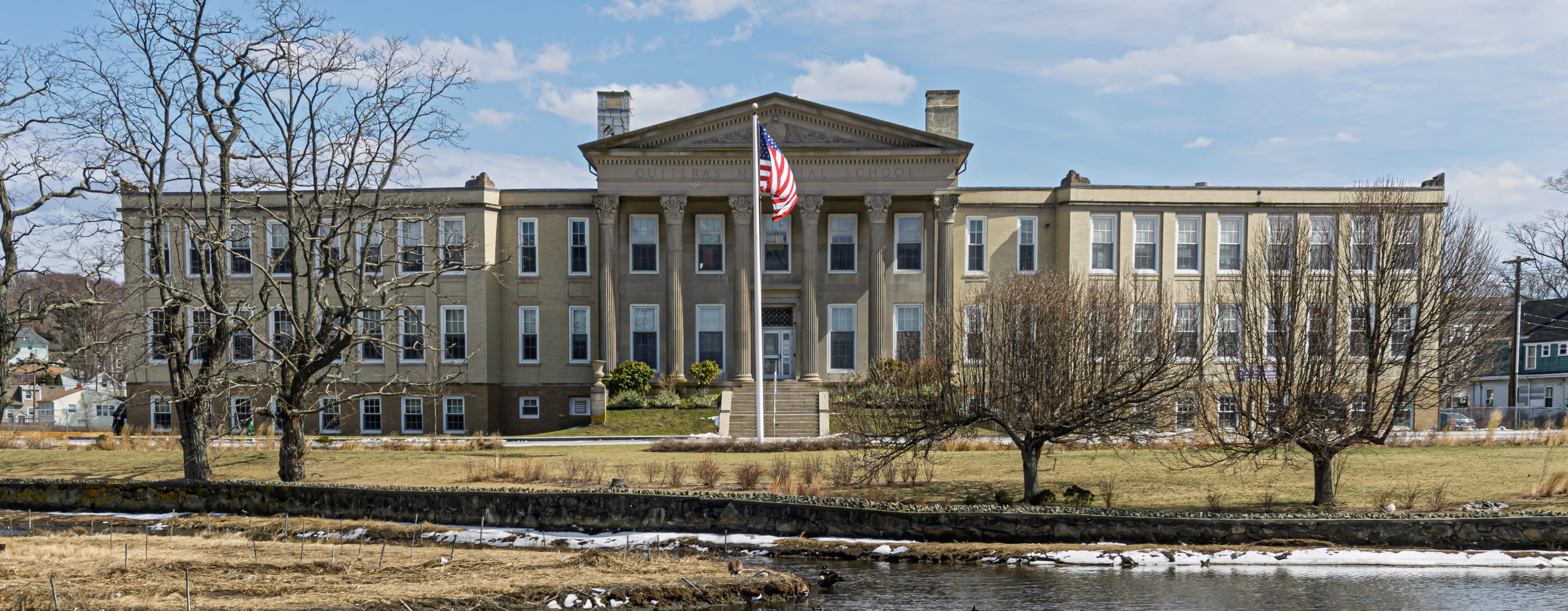
Guiteras Memorial Building

Howe was associated with Prescott O. Clarke, another MIT graduate, for 27 years. During this period, Clarke & Howe emerged as one of the city's chief architectural firms, with Jackson, Robertson & Adams as their biggest competitor.

Designs include:

- 1916–1917 – Saint Martin's Church, 50 Orchard Avenue, Providence, Rhode Island, "an unknown masterpiece of early twentieth-century Gothic".
- 1925 – Parish House at St. Martin's Church, 50 Orchard Avenue, Providence, Rhode Island.
- 1925 — Guiteras Memorial Building, Bristol, Rhode Island. A large school building; closed in 2025 due to declining enrollment.

== Summary ==
=== Howe & Church, 1928–1938 ===
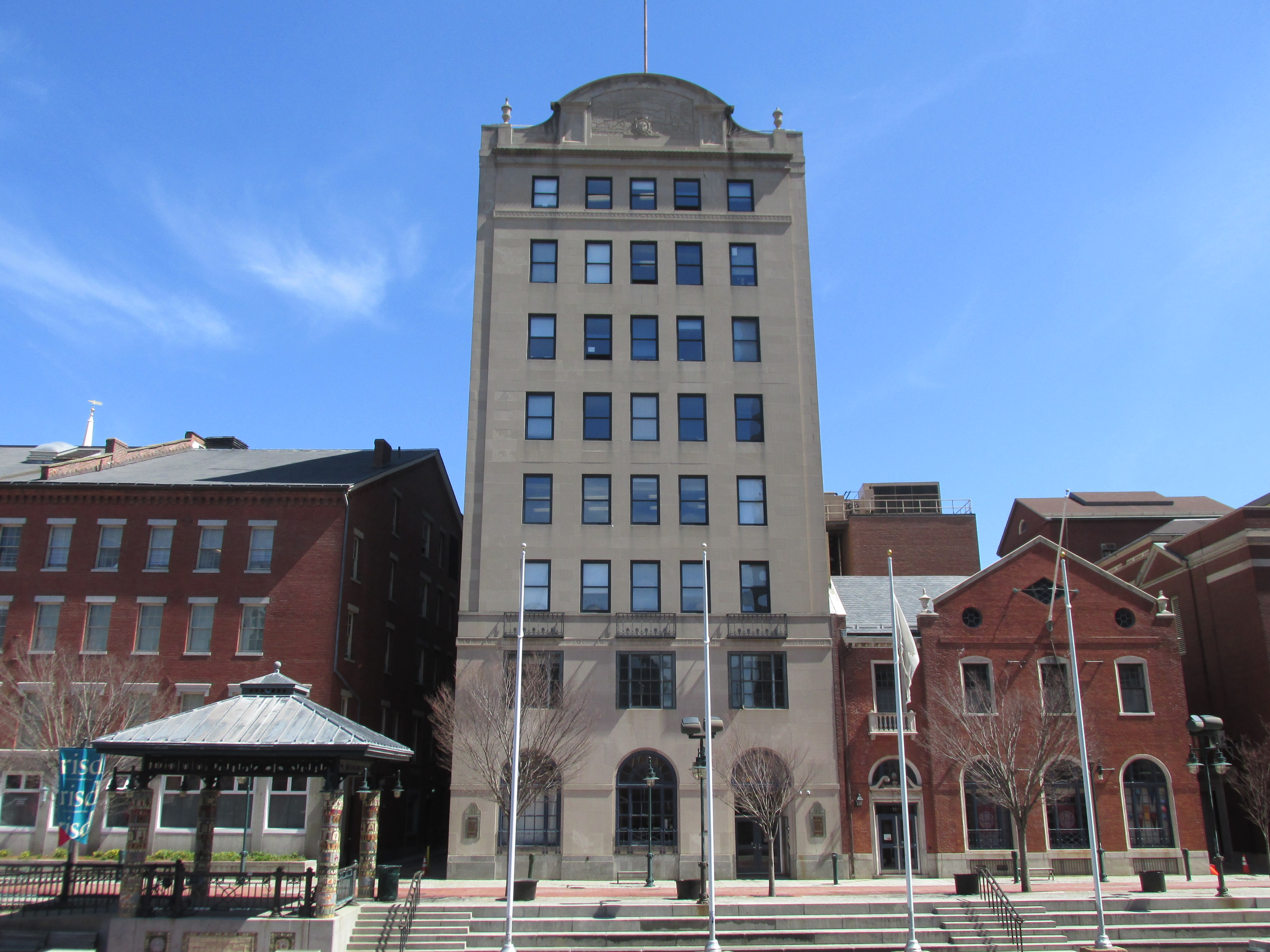
Insurance Building, Providence, 1929. It conforms to the neighboring Morris Plan Building, by Jackson, Robertson & Adams. Both are owned by RISD.

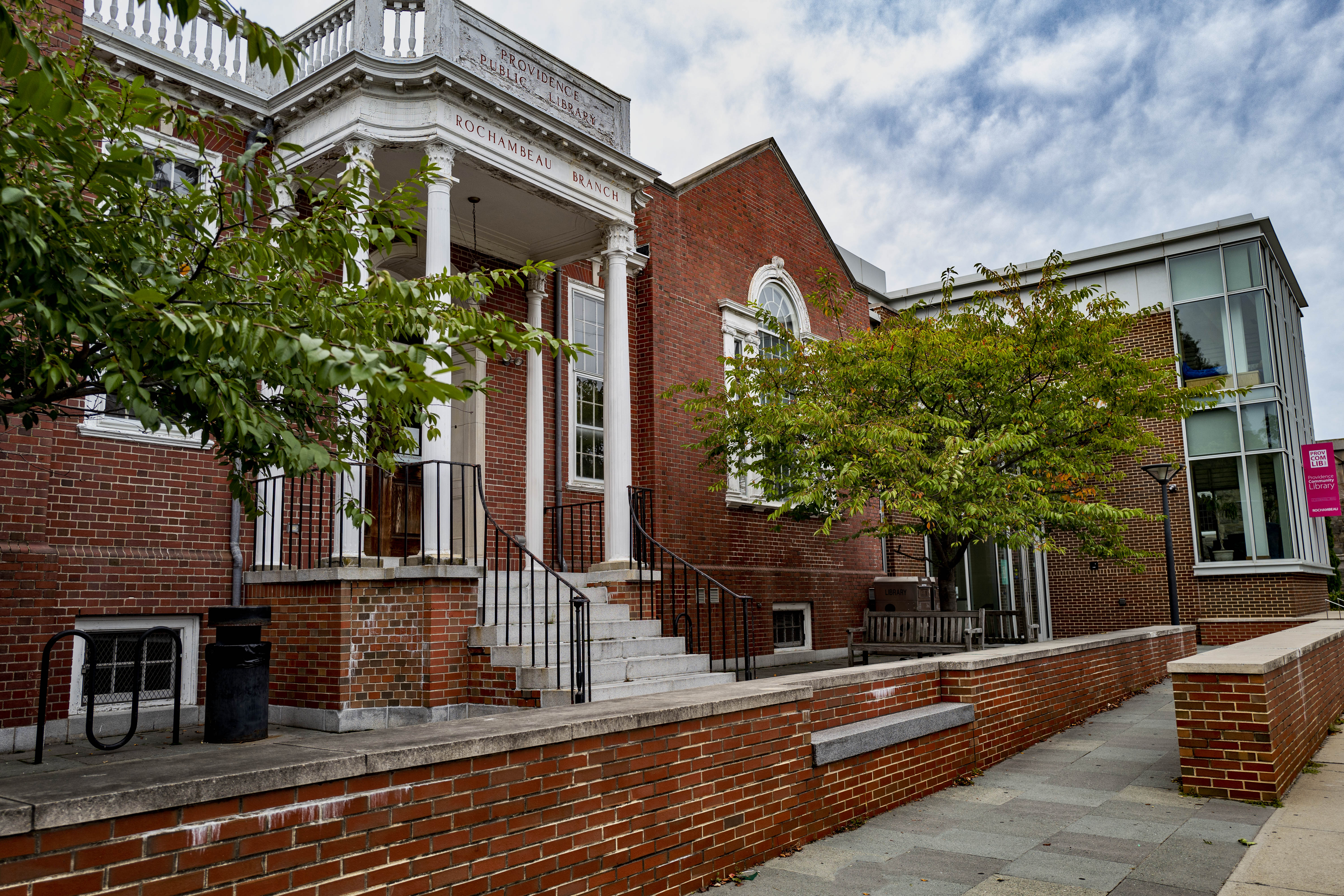
Rochambeau Branch Library, Providence, 1930. The addition on the right was added in 2003 by Ann Beha Architects.

In 1928 Prescott Clarke retired and was replaced by long-time employee Samuel W. Church. The newly established firm had few opportunities to design commercial buildings, due to the Great Depression. With the exception of three buildings in 1929, no such commissions came into the office until World War II. The first of these was the Insurance Building, on Canal Street. It was built to house two insurance companies, the Rhode Island Insurance Company and the Merchants Fire Insurance Company. For this, the last tall building built until the 1950s, Howe chose to reuse one of his favorite motifs, the ogee gable. With the exception of this distinctive element, the building is otherwise a plain, conservative example of the Colonial Revival in limestone. The next building was the Empire Street headquarters of the Old Stone Safe Deposit and Trust Company, a newly established subsidiary of the Providence Institution for Savings. It uses a much more ornate Classicism than many of the firm's contemporary works. Most of the neighboring buildings are plain, and this building may be considered the "visual highlight" of the block. The third commercial building, now lost, was the Providence National Bank at 90 Westminster Street. It was a standard neo-Georgian work, though it was noted for its expansive use of glass. In 1937, it was called out as one of the best modern commercial buildings in the state. In 2005 it was demolished for the 110 Westminster project, which was never built.

Civic and academic buildings composed much of the firm's output for many years. This was kicked off in 1929 with Howe & Church being commissioned to design the new Emma Pendleton Bradley Hospital in East Providence, a children's psychiatric hospital. The building was, like many of Howe's designs, was in the neo-Georgian style, again reusing the ogee gable. The following year the architects designed the Rochambeau and South Providence libraries for the Providence Public Library. These were to be based on the prototype Clarke & Howe had developed in the '20s, but that design proved impractical for the chosen sites. Rochambeau was a distinctive H-plan structure, featuring neo-Georgian motifs heavily. South Providence, on a narrow mid-block site, was very plainly built. In 1932 Howe designed a new building for the Roger Williams Baptist Church, at a time occupying an 1855 building by Thomas A. Tefft. Due to the building's declining condition and the depression, the church decided to consolidate some of its operations with the Cranston Street Baptist Church. The Cranston Street church offered to pay for much of the building's cost, with the stipulation that they could use the new building's community facilities. The church built its new building in a Byzantine revival style, at Cranston and Ford Streets. In 1935 Howe planned a second major hospital, the main building at the Rhode Island State Sanitorium at Wallum Lake. Known as Wallum Lake House, it replaced Thornton & Thornton's deteriorating building, built in 1903. Howe's design was modeled on his Bradley Hospital, on a much larger scale. While that was under construction, Howe designed the new Cranston City Hall, which replaced a 19th-century building that was considered a firetrap. The new building, built in 1936, was large but otherwise unremarkable.

Howe & Church also built a number of private residences, mostly by 1931. The largest of these was a house in 1929 for William S. Tully at 132 Nayatt Road in Barrington. In 1930 in Providence, the architects designed a house for Elizabeth G. Wood, Samuel Church's widowed daughter. At 72 Manning Street, it is a good example of neo-Federal work inspired by the work of John Holden Greene. In 1938, they designed a large mansion for Charles B. Rockwell Jr. at Bristol, on Poppasquash Road. Known as Point Pleasant, it is a simple but large example of rural English revival.

Other designs include:

- 1929 – Faunce House Annex, Brown University, Providence, Rhode Island
- 1930 – Frederick A. Hallworth House, 330 Freeman Pkwy, Providence, Rhode Island
- 1930 – Theodore L. Sweet House, 5 Stadium Road, Providence, Rhode Island
- 1931 – Astor Hall, St. George's School, Middletown, Rhode Island
- 1931 – William Dixon House, 20 High St, Bristol, Rhode Island
- 1933 – Nurses' Home, Providence Lying-In Hospital, 50 Maude Street, Providence, Rhode Island
- 1934 – Bristol County Courthouse (Restoration), 240 High Street, Bristol, Rhode Island
- 1935 – Simpson Hall, Rhode Island State Hospital for Mental Diseases, Howard, Rhode Island
- 1938 – Barrington Public Library (Old), 283 County Road, Barrington, Rhode Island
- 1938 – Weaver Memorial Library, 41 Grove Avenue, East Providence, Rhode Island

=== Howe & Prout, 1938–1946 ===
Samuel Church retired from the firm in 1938, and head draftsman Earle F. Prout became a partner. During this period of Howe's career, the firm lost individual residential commissions, but regained commercial work. 1940 marked the beginning of the firm's relationship with the New England Telephone and Telegraph Company, a Boston-based utility. NET&T had bought out the Providence Telephone Company, for which Clarke & Howe had designed a major office building, and now were in charge of designing telephone exchanges for the company. The first of these, built in 1940, was the Fall River exchange. At 326 North Main Street, it is vaguely neo-Georgian, but contains modernist influences. Next, in 1941, was a replacement for the company's South Providence/Edgewood exchange. At 1096 Broad Street, it is a plain but unexpectedly monumental building in the neo-Georgian style. Parts of the building have been altered, and it has been vacated by the telephone company.

Howe & Prout are known to have designed two churches, in 1941 and 1945. The first of these is St. Martin's, at Newport & Hughes in Pawtucket. Like Clarke & Howe's much earlier St. Martin's in Providence, it was based on a typical English village church, a common source for American church architecture. The second was the parish house of the Riverside Congregational Church, at Riverside. Howe & Prout were commissioned to design the whole complex, but the original architects were dead by the time funds were raised. What was built is a simple neo-Colonial building, domestic in scale. The church itself was built in 1967 and designed by Michael Traficante of East Providence.

Howe & Prout also designed two military housing complexes. The first of these, at Quonset Point in 1942, was part of the large expansion of the base there. Known as Hoskins Park, it was a group of low-slung, Minimal Traditional, multi-family residences. The entire site was demolished in 1994 for more modern housing. The area is now referred to as Wickford Point. The second one, at Newport in 1944, had a similar fate. Called Tonomoy Hill, it was built on a much larger scale. Here, the houses were arranged along crescent-shaped streets. After the navy left Rhode Island, the neighborhood became poverty- and crime-ridden. It was demolished and redeveloped in its entirety in 2006.

=== Howe, Prout & Ekman, 1946–1959 ===
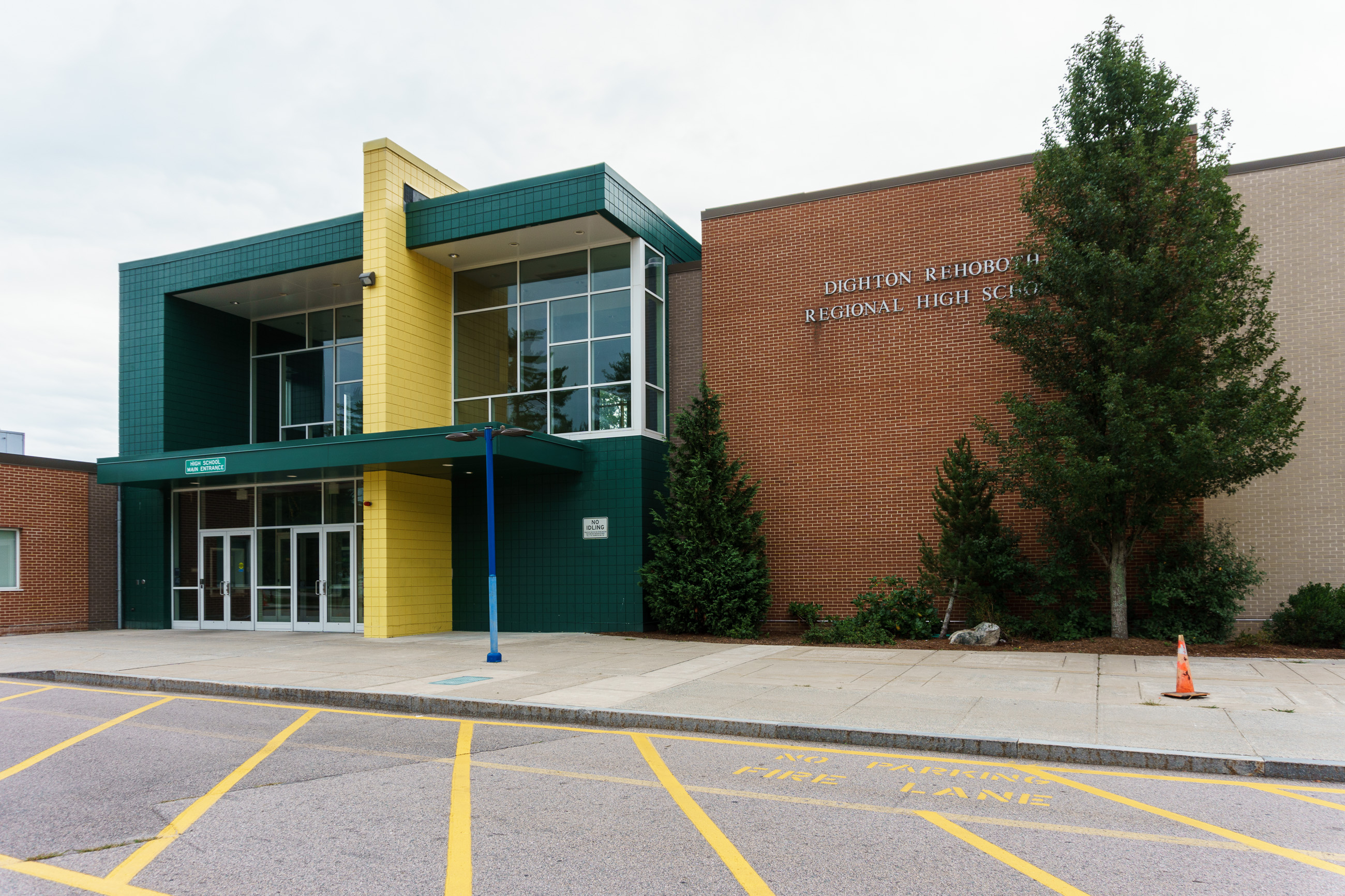
Dighton-Rehoboth Regional High School, Dighton, 1959.

In 1946, Edward O. Ekman rejoined the firm. He was a member of Howe & Church from 1928 to 1931, when he established his own office. Ekman began to trickle modernism into his work, and brought this to the Howe office. The firm gradually adopted modernism gradually, but did not design any more neo-traditional buildings after Howe's retirement from active practice circa 1955. At this time, Ekman and Prout's younger son, Donald J. Prout, took control of design.

During this period the firm continued to work for New England Telephone. In 1946 they built one on Pleasant Street in Taunton. This was followed in 1947 by one in Warren, on Everett Street. This was probably the first fully modernist building to be designed in the office. In 1948 they designed a much larger building in Brockton, at 65 Crescent Street. It is a full three stories, but has much in common with the Providence building. As Howe, Prout & Ekman they also received several commissions from financial institutions. In 1950 the Providence National Bank had them design an annex to their 1929 building, at 35 Weybosset Street. All but the façade of the building was demolished for the 110 project. The following year they built the headquarters of the Providence Mutual Fire Insurance Company on Mutual Place. It contrasted with their usual Colonial work, in that it used only a minimal amount of ornament. Also in 1951, they completed a major expansion to the Telephone Building downtown, which was the culmination of their New England Telephone work. They also built the clubhouse at the Rhode Island Country Club in Barrington that year.

As early as 1944 the architects had planned a new church complex for the Phillips Baptist Church in Cranston, and construction finally began in 1947. In 1950 they designed what was then known as Kent County Memorial Hospital in Warwick. A fully International Style building, it would receive awards for its planning. In 1953 they began construction on the addition to the Providence Public Library. It originally had been proposed by Clarke & Howe in 1919, but fund-raising took over three decades. The new building was one of the largest examples of modernist architecture in Providence at the time. In 1954 they completed the Memorial Union at the University of Rhode Island in Kingston. It, too, was indicative of the firm's adoption of modernism. In later years it was remodeled beyond recognition. In 1956 they began designing a new campus for Rhode Island College, in northern Providence. Completed in 1958, it would later be expanded by Prout & Associates. In 1959 they designed the new Dighton-Rehoboth Regional High School, in Dighton.

Other works include:

- 1952 – Gladstone Street School, Gladstone St, Cranston, Rhode Island
- 1953 – Newman Congregational Church (Parish House), 100 Newman Ave, Rumford, Rhode Island
- 1954 – Primrose Hill School, Middle Hwy, Barrington, Rhode Island
- 1958 – William D'Abate Memorial School, Kossuth St, Providence, Rhode Island

=== Howe & Prout, 1960 ===
In 1959 Ekman left to reestablish his own practice. The firm name reverted to Howe & Prout the following year. However, Earle Prout died that same year, and his son, Donald Prout, age 29, became the sole active partner.

The two known Howe & Prout projects are both International Style hospital buildings. The first of these was a new building for the Josiah B. Thomas Hospital in Peabody, Massachusetts. The hospital had outgrown its old, Colonial Revival building, since demolished. The 1960 building is at present known as Kindred Hospital. The second project was an addition to the Roger Williams Hospital in Providence. Published in 1961, it made exceptional use of glass curtain walls.

When Howe died, the office was reestablished as Donald J. Prout & Associates.
