= Nathaniel Pearce House =

Historic house in Rhode Island, United States

- U.S. National Register of Historic Places
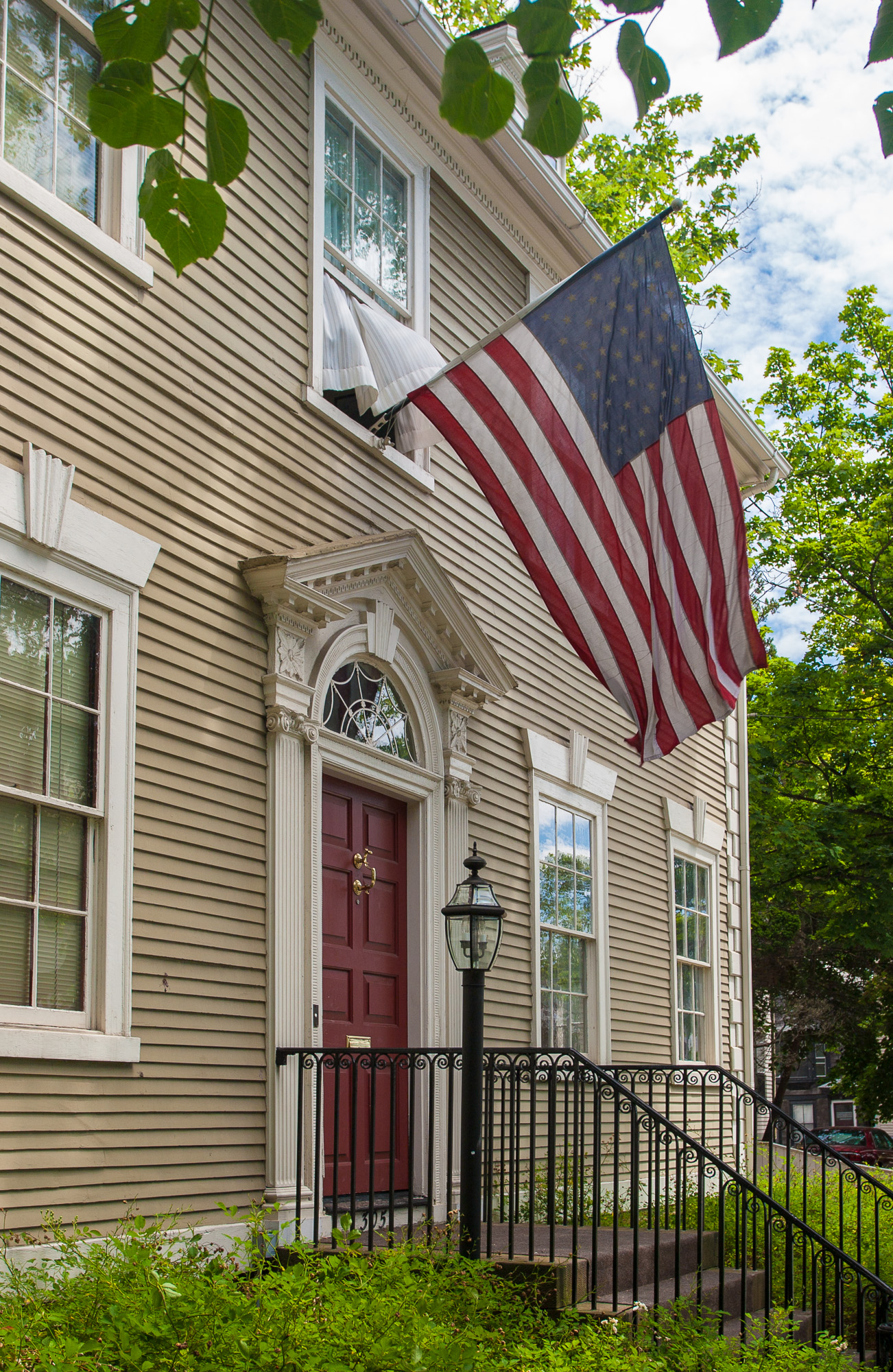

- Location within Rhode Island Location within the United States
- Location: Providence, Rhode Island
- Coordinates: 41°49′31.1226″N 71°23′55.5966″W
- Built: 1801; 1915
- Architect: Clarke & Howe
- Architectural style: Early Republic
- NRHP reference No.: 72000002
- Added to NRHP: May 19, 1972

The Nathaniel Pearce House is an historic house at 305 Brook Street in Providence, Rhode Island. This Early Republican house is an "archetype of domestic design of its period". It was built in 1801 at 41 George Street on Brown's Main Green facing University Hall, where it enjoyed a view of Narragansett Bay. Nathaniel Pearce, a ship-master and ship-owner, purchased it circa 1780, doubled its size with a central hallway and new ornamental entrance and re-oriented to George Street in 1800. By 1888 it was owned by the Goddard family, who sold the George Street land to Brown University. Conditions of the sale required the house be either demolished or moved. John J. DeWolf bought the house and moved it to Brook Street in that year. In 1915, his nephew Halsey DeWolf, MD inherited the house and commissioned an expansion and colonial revival enhancements by his wife's cousin, architect Wallis E. Howe of Clarke & Howe. Landscape architects Searle & Searle refurbished the rear garden in the mid-1990s.

It was added to the National Register of Historic Places in 1972.

== See also ==
- National Register of Historic Places listings in Providence, Rhode Island

== Notes ==
- Cawley (1971), National Register of Historic Places Inventory - Nomination Form
