= Benjamin Church House =

Benjamin Church House may refer to:

- Benjamin Church House (Bristol, Rhode Island), listed on the National Register of Historic Places in Bristol County, Rhode Island
- Benjamin Church House (Shorewood, Wisconsin), listed on the National Register of Historic Places in Milwaukee County, Wisconsin
