= Anthony–Kinney Farm =

- U.S. National Register of Historic Places
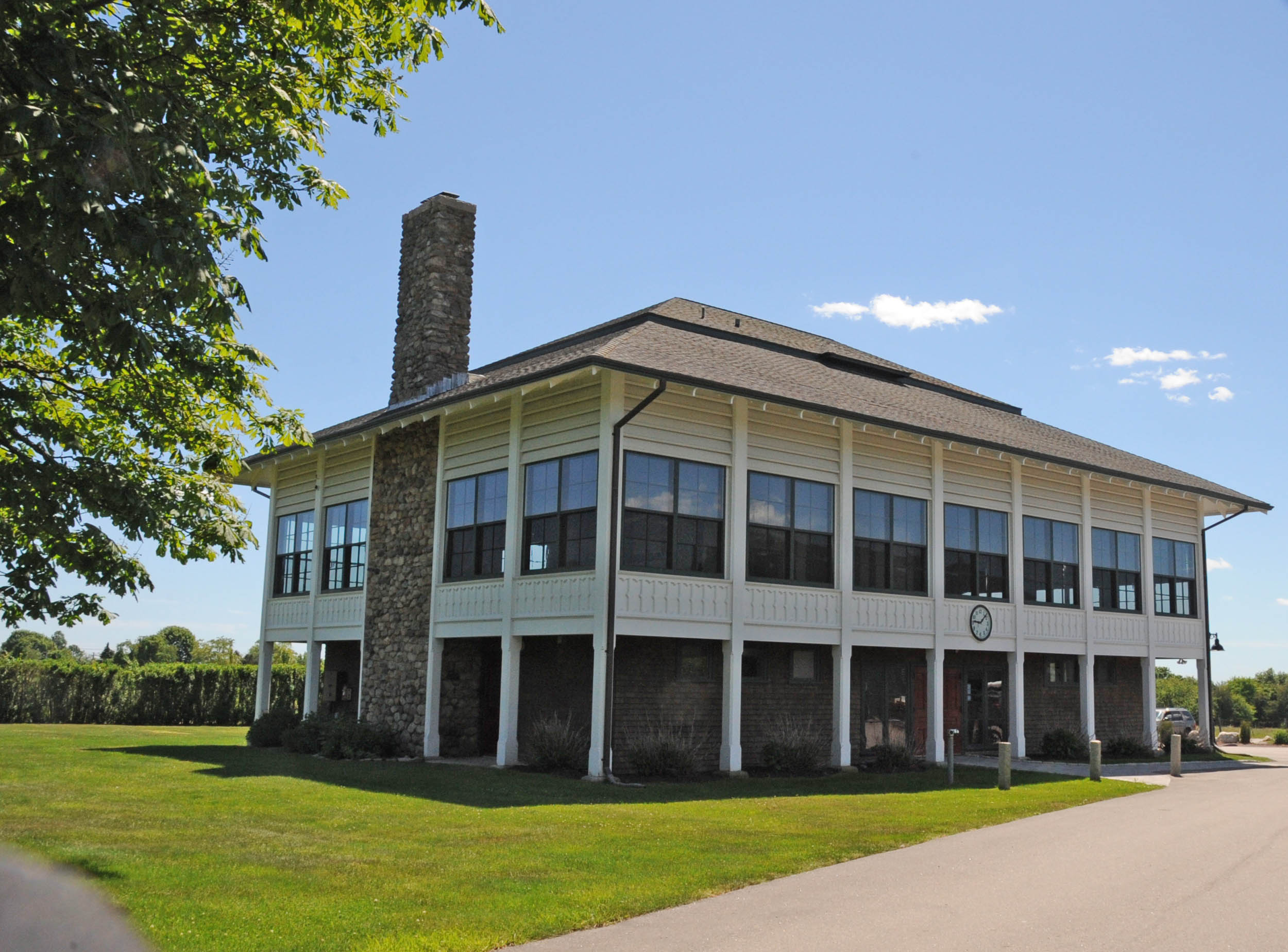

- Location within Rhode Island Location within the United States
- Interactive map showing the location for Anthony-Kinney Farm
- Location: 505 Point Judith Road, Narragansett, Rhode Island
- Coordinates: 41°24′26″N 71°28′44″W
- Built: 1899
- Architect: Clarke & Spaulding
- Architectural style: Bungalow
- NRHP reference No.: 13000178
- Added to NRHP: April 17, 2013

The Anthony–Kinney Farm is a historic farm and resort complex at 505 Point Judith Road in Narragansett, Rhode Island. The property, now a town-owned recreation area known as Sunset Farm, saw agricultural use for over 300 years, and was converted into a private resort around the turn of the 20th century. The Point Judith area was among the first in Rhode Island to be purchased from the local Narragansett people, in 1657. The farm was acquired by James E. Anthony in 1850, who sold it to Francis Kinney in 1897. Kinney maintained much of the land in agricultural use, but built an extravagant resort complex, including a distinctive East Indian bungalow as a clubhouse, and built a private nine-hole golf course. Kinney died in 1908, and the property was owned by the Chase family until 1991, when most of it was purchased by the town. It is managed by the town as an active farm, and the restored clubhouse is available for rent as function space.

The farm was listed on the National Register of Historic Places in 2013.

== See also ==
- National Register of Historic Places listings in Washington County, Rhode Island
