= Moran Shipping Agencies =

Moran Shipping Agencies, Inc.
- Type: Private company
- Industry: Maritime
- Founded: 1937
- Headquarters: Providence, Rhode Island, US
- Key people: James A Black, CEO; Michael T. Black, Chairman, F. Robert Black, Chairman Emeritus
- Website: Moranshipping.com

Moran Shipping Agencies, Inc. is a U.S. based steamship agency company, with its corporate office in Providence, Rhode Island. Moran Shipping Agencies is the largest independently owned shipping agent in the U.S.; providing full agency attendance and ship husbandry services for over 5000 port calls per year, as well maritime port and vessel security services, in over 100 ports in North America.

== History of Moran Shipping Agencies Inc. ==
Moran Shipping Agencies, Inc. was founded by James F. Moran in 1937. It began as a Rhode Island–based corporation operating in Providence and nearby Fall River, Massachusetts. By the time James F. Moran died in 1959, he had expanded and established additional ship agency offices in Boston, Massachusetts, and Portland, Maine, but Moran Shipping always remained a Rhode Island company. Edward Moran succeeded his brother in the ownership of Moran Shipping Agencies. During Edward Moran’s tenure, F. Robert Black joined the Company and acquired ownership in 1974. F. Robert Black was joined by his brother James A. Black; together they continued efforts to expand the company further. In 1975 a full service office was opened in Houston shortly followed by offices in Port Arthur and Corpus Christi, Texas. In 1976, Kurz-Moran of New Jersey was formed in partnership with the Chas Kurz Company. During the 1980s Moran continued their expansion across the US Gulf opening offices in New Orleans, Louisiana, and Tampa, Florida.

Michael T. Black joined his brothers in 1982 working in an administrative and sales capacity from Moran’s Headquarters Office in Rhode Island. Upon F. Robert’s retirement in 1985, James and Michael acquired ownership of the company and continued the efforts of expanding its presence throughout North America. The decade of the 1990s marked significant growth and expansion for Moran Shipping. Moran Shipping Agencies acquired ownership of the Boston based Patterson & Wilde Steamship Agency and full ownership of Kurz-Moran Agencies in New Jersey and Philadelphia. Moran Shipping Agencies has continued its expansion: in the Gulf, Lake Charles, Louisiana, Galveston, Texas, Freeport, Texas; in the South Atlantic; South Carolina; Florida and the West Coast. Currently the Company has 20 full service offices serving nearly 100 ports in North America.

In 2005, Michael T. Black resigned from his position as Chief Executive Officer. He continues to retain his partnership interest in the Company and serves as its Chairman. James A. Black now serves as President and CEO of Moran Shipping Agencies; over the last decade leading Moran to become a knowledge economy company, based on geographic expansion and a diversification of services. Moran Shipping Agencies continues to be a family owned and operated company, second generation family employees include, Exec. V.P. Jason E. Kelly, In-house Legal Counsel Gavin R. Black, and vessel agent Andrew Black. Moran shipping agencies continues to be an ISO 9001:2000 certified company. Today, Moran Shipping has more than 150 full-time employees in 22 offices in the United States and Europe, and provides assistance at more than 100 ports along the East, Gulf and West Coasts for all sizes and types of vessels.

== Agency services offered by Moran ==
- US Government Compliance: U.S. Customs and Border Protection / Coast Guard and all other government regulations that affect ships, crews, and cargoes.
- Hub Agency Solutions: In particular, crude and clean product tankers, LNG, LPG, chemical, dry-bulk, cruise and container vessels.
- AMS and ENOA/D submission services.
- Web-based voyage accounting and finance services.
- ISO certified Port Vendor Management services.
- Maritime Management of Information Systems including online, detailed local marine and port facility information, electronic daily port updates and real-time port information alerts.
- Maritime and Port Security Services.

== Moran's corporate headquarters building ==

Moran shipping’s corporate headquarters building is the Historic 13,000-square-foot (1,200 m^{2}) former Rhode Island Medical Society Building at 106 Francis Street, Providence, Rhode Island. The building was built in 1911 by Clark, Howe and Homer in a colonial revival style and added to the National Register of Historic Places in 1984. Moran like many other Knowledge Economy companies took advantage of Rhode Island's Historic tax credit program to renovate a historic building into a modern business office. The Building's renovation was completed in 2010, and is designed to provide a new LEED certified corporate headquarters for the Moran Shipping Agency. A Gold LEED certification will be the first for a building in the U.S. individually listed on the national register of historic places, earning the project the Rhody award in 2010 for green preservation and the 2010 adaptive reuse award from the Providence Preservation society. The building features several private offices, a glass-walled conference room that is suspended within the former library stacks, an operations’ center, an administrative area in the large vaulted former auditorium, and a new glass and brick enclosed stairwell addition. This building is the site of the first geothermal system in Downtown Providence. The system employs two 1,500-foot (460 m) wells drilled in the narrow space between the building and the sidewalk. Jason Kelly (of Moran Shipping) says that the two wells have provided all the energy that was needed to completely heat and cool the building. During the coldest month last winter, his utility bill was $31, and that was to heat hot water, a separate system. The well will provide a constant source of water ranging from 46 to 50 degrees that will be pumped up to at a rate of 78 gallons per minute to a heat exchanger, and then recycled back into the building. ground.

.
