= Clarke & Howe =

American architectural firm

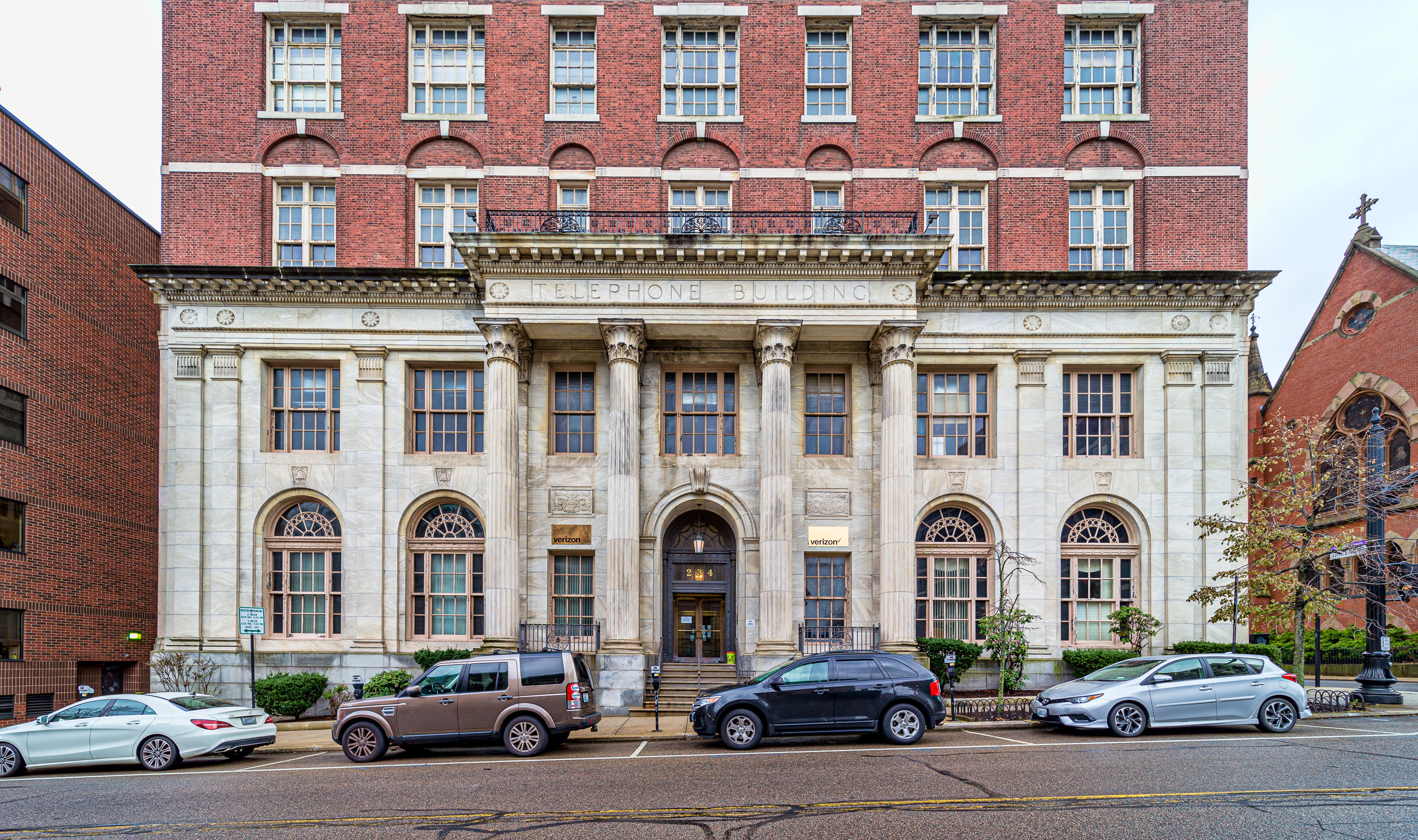
Telephone Building (1917), Providence

Clarke & Howe was an American architectural firm from Providence, Rhode Island that was active from 1893 to 1928.

The firm was established in 1893 as Clarke & Spaulding, with Prescott O. Clarke and Arthur R. Spaulding. Wallis E. Howe was added as a partner in 1901, with the firm becoming Clarke, Spaulding & Howe. This association was short-lived, as Spaulding retired from architecture later that year. From 1907 to 1913 the firm was known as Clarke, Howe & Homer, with Eleazer B. Homer, a former Massachusetts Institute of Technology professor of architecture. Clarke & Howe was dissolved upon Clarke's retirement in 1928, with Howe continuing the practice as Howe & Church.

== Partner Biographies ==
=== Prescott Orloff Clarke ===
Prescott Orloff Clarke was born in Providence on March 10, 1858. He attended private schools, and graduated from Brown University, class of 1880. He then worked for Brown & Sharpe, and was later with Clarke, Black & Co., of which his father, George L. Clarke, was the senior partner.

George Clarke died in 1890, and Prescott decided to pursue architecture. He moved to Boston, where he attended Massachusetts Institute of Technology. Soon after his return in 1893 he partnered with Spaulding. They continued in partnership together until 1901, Spaulding's retirement. Clarke himself retired in 1928, and died on November 18, 1936.

=== Arthur R. Spaulding ===
The life of Arthur R. Spaulding is unknown.

=== Wallis Eastburn Howe ===
Wallis Eastburn Howe was born in 1868 in Bristol, as the youngest of 18 children. Howe attended Lehigh University and Massachusetts Institute of Technology. He returned to Rhode Island by 1894, and may have established his own office. In 1895 he began working for Martin & Hall, noted Providence architects. There he attained a high rank, and was permitted to accept his own commissions. He remained with Martin & Hall until 1901, when he was accepted into the partnership of Clarke, Spaulding & Howe. He remained with Clarke until his 1928 retirement. After 1928, he embarked on a series of successful partnerships, beginning with Howe & Church and ending with Howe & Prout. He died in 1960.

=== Eleazer Bartlett Homer ===
Eleazer Bartlett Homer was born in Somerville, Massachusetts in 1864. He graduated from Massachusetts Institute of Technology in 1885. For a few years he worked for Hartwell & Richardson, and opened his own practice in 1889. From 1887 to 1900 he was a professor at MIT, and was a lecturer there from then until at least 1915. He was also the director of Rhode Island School of Design from 1900 to 1907. That year he associated himself with Clarke and Howe as Clarke, Howe & Homer. In 1913 he reestablished his own practice in Providence, maintaining it until his death in 1929.

== Architectural works ==
=== Clarke & Spaulding, 1893-1901 ===
Soon after their 1893 formation, Clarke & Spaulding began publishing their designs in the American Architect and Building News. These are best represented by a series of four Tudor Revival designs. The first of these was the "Proposed Inn at Nayatt, RI", published in January 1894. Apparently not built, what is shown is a sprawling seaside resort complex, positioned somewhere in southern Barrington. In 1896, Prescott Clarke built himself a large house at 203 Blackstone Boulevard in Providence. Already well off from his prior industrial pursuits, the house was one of the largest then built in that part of the city. It was published in 1897. In June 1897, a design for a residence for Dr. Frederick Danne in Bristol was published. This house, built in 1896 near the foot of Smith Street, showcased a hybrid mix of the Tudor Revival as well as the Shingle Style. It no longer stands. In 1897 the architects designed a large double house at 184-186 Upton Avenue in Providence. It was commissioned by Courtney Langdon, a Brown University professor of languages. The two halves are designed to contrast enough to be seen as different residences, but still cooperate as a single building. This design was published in 1898.

Another important commission was the Fletcher Building (1895), at Union and Westminster in downtown Providence. It is a large, Classical Revival building, built for the Fletcher heirs. Originally a three-story building, in 1902 Clarke & Howe were commissioned to add three additional floors. Later, in 1900, the architects designed a large clubhouse for Francis Kinney in Narragansett. Known as Kinney's Casino, it was based on an East Indian bungalow.

Other designs include:

- William Binney Duplex, 100 Meeting Street, Providence (1898)
- Irving P. Eddy House, 306 Olney Street, Providence (1898)

=== Clarke, Spaulding & Howe, 1901 ===
The association of the three architects together was extremely short, lasting only for part of a year. When Howe arrived from Martin & Hall, he brought a commission for a mill in Pawtucket. This, the American Textile Mill at 250 Esten Avenue, is noted especially for its Renaissance Revival tower. The other known commission from this period is St. George's School in Middletown. It came to the firm because the school's founder and headmaster, John B. Diman, was Clarke's cousin. For the school, the architects designed a reserved red brick building, which used elements from both the Colonial and Dutch Renaissance revivals. Clarke would design for the school until 1927, and Howe until at least 1957.

=== Clarke & Howe, 1901-1907 ===
Before 1903, Clarke & Howe were known primarily for their residential designs. This changed that year, when they won the commission for the U. S. Federal Building on Kennedy Plaza in downtown Providence.

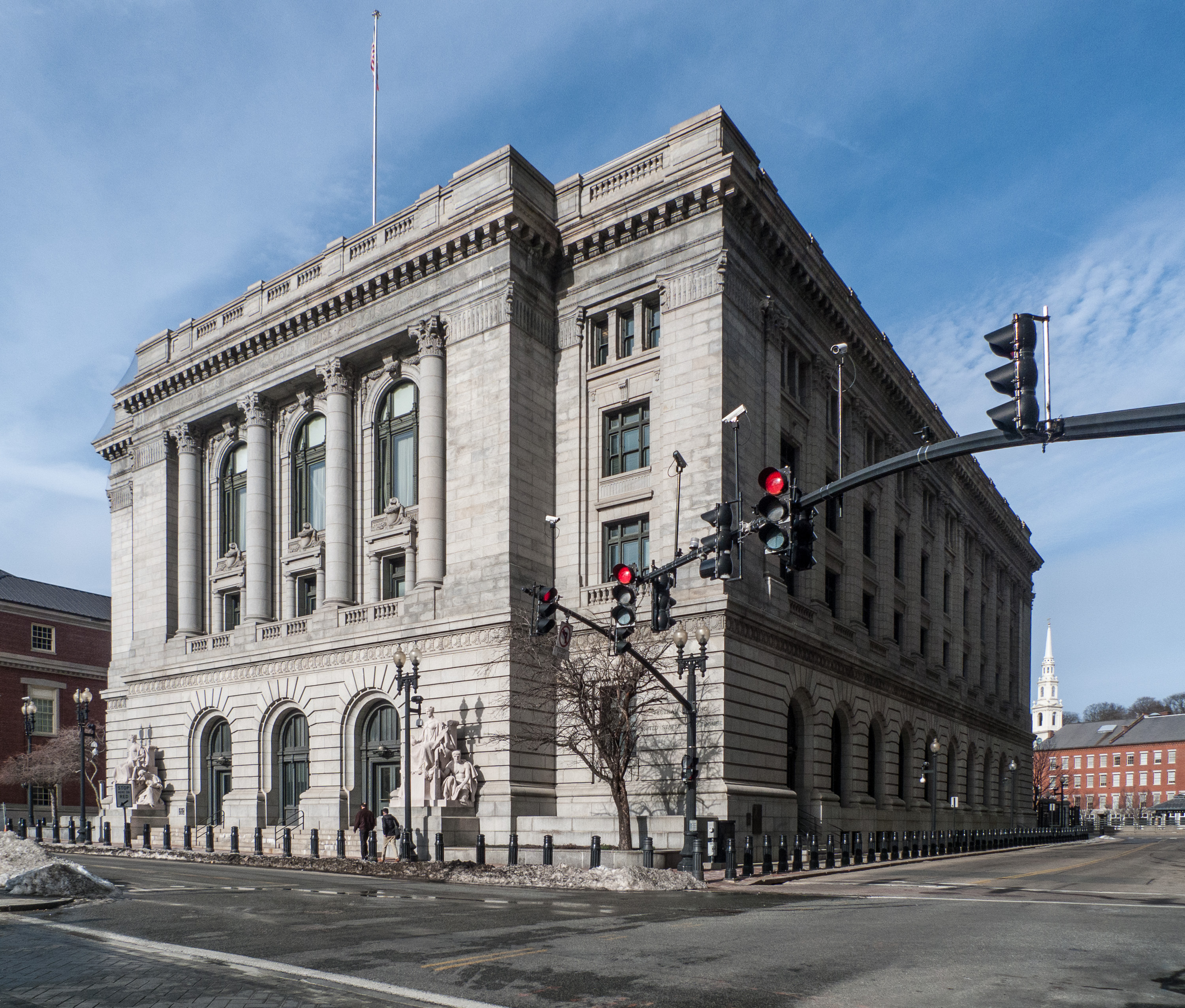
U. S. Federal Building (1904–08), Providence

Construction began on this major Beaux-Arts building in 1904, and it was completed four years later in 1908. The design competition attracted ten entries, from New England and New York, but this design by a local firm was selected unanimously. Clarke & Howe was assisted in the design by Harvey Wiley Corbett, who had been working in their office after returning from Europe.

Also in 1903, the firm completed two other non-residential designs. The first of these was the Portsmouth Savings Bank in downtown Portsmouth, New Hampshire. Begun in 1902, this was actually an overhaul of a much earlier bank building, and the resulting design was typical of temple-front twentieth century banks. The other was for the Engineering Building at Brown University. Unlike the other two buildings, this is a plainer Colonial Revival building. Today, known as the Lincoln Field Building, it is home to the department of geological science.

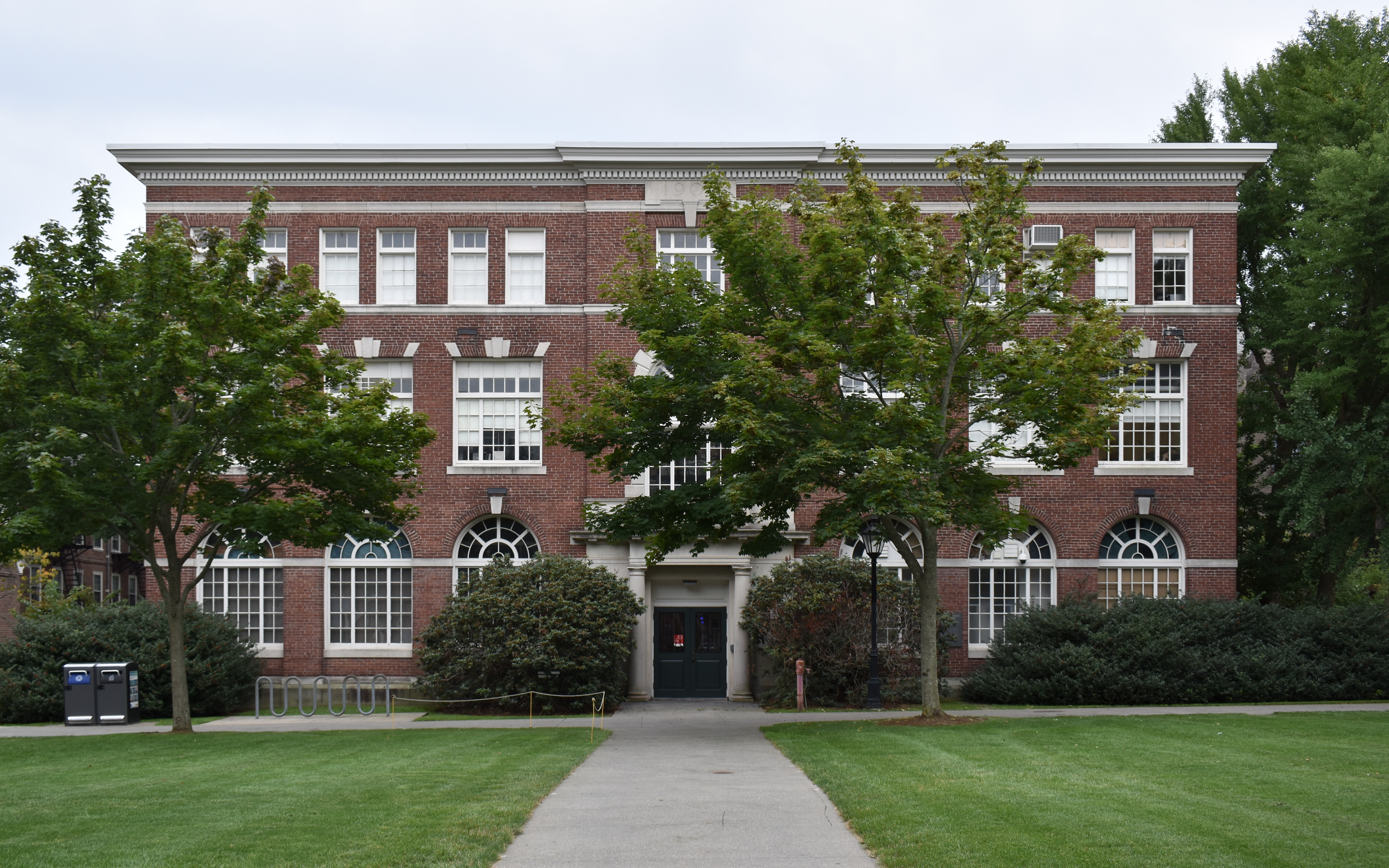
Engineering Building (1903), Brown University, Providence, Rhode Island

They also designed many residences during this period, most prominent of which are a 1903 house at 102 Prospect Street in Providence, built for Dr. Henry A. Whitmarsh, and another at 140 Blackstone Boulevard for Charles D. Dunlop in 1907–08.

Other designs include:

- Farm Group, The Oaks (R. H. I. Goddard estate), Potowomut, Rhode Island (1902) - Demolished.
- Richard W. Comstock, Jr. House, 203 Governor Street, Providence (1905)
- H. Anthony Dyer House, 170 Blackstone Boulevard, Providence (1906) - Altered.

=== Clarke, Howe & Homer, 1907-1913 ===
Concurrent to the addition of Eleazer B. Homer, the architects began receiving commissions for more civic structures. The first of these was the Benjamin Church Home for Aged Men on Hope Street in Bristol. The building was commissioned by the family of Samuel W. Church, a draftsman with the firm who would become a partner upon Clarke's retirement. Built to a residential scale, it is considered a "very pure example" of Colonial Revival architecture.

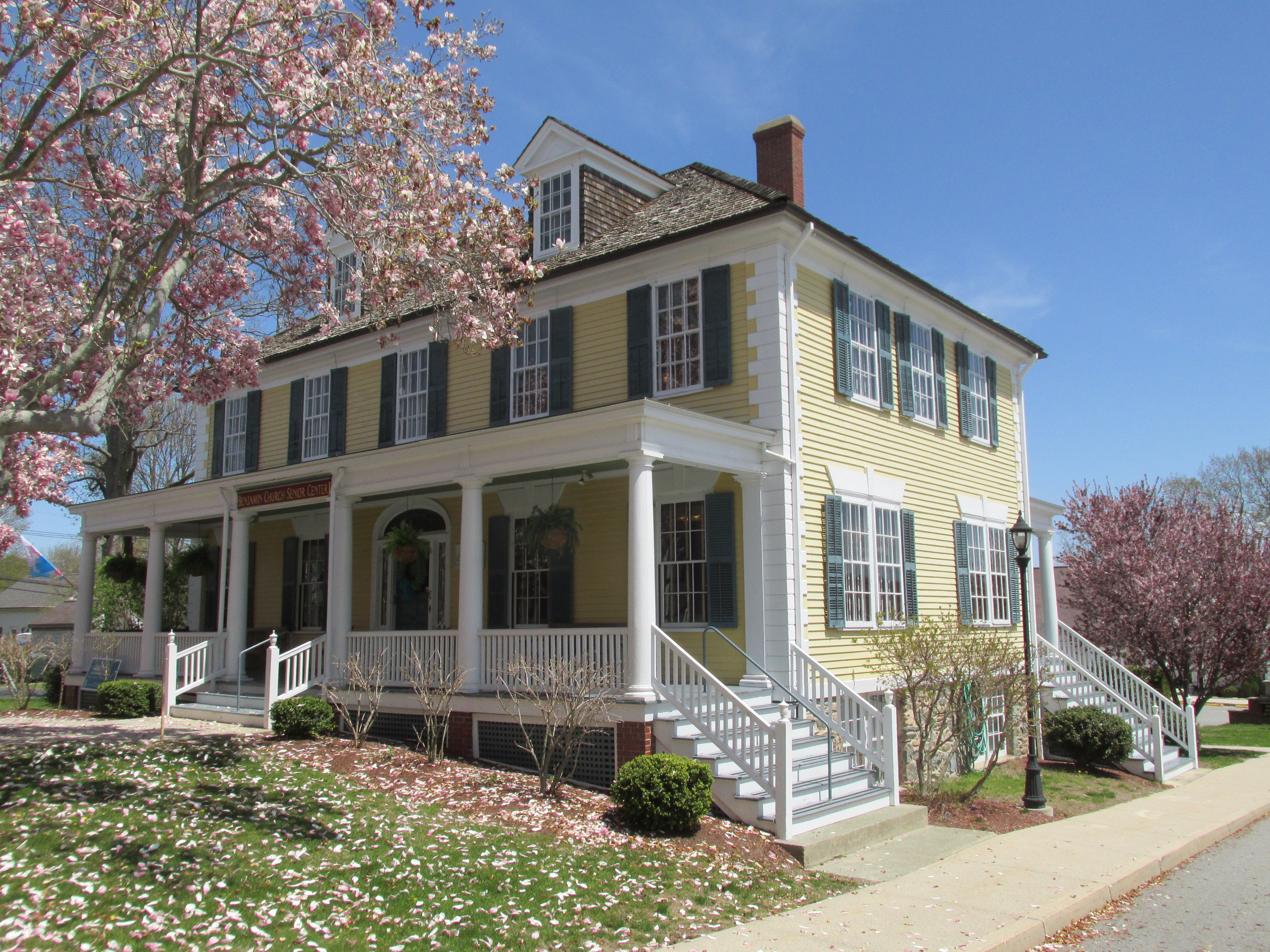
Benjamin Church Home for Aged Men (1908–09), Bristol

In 1909, they designed the Veazie Street Grammar School, at Veazie and Douglas Avenue in Providence. Now an elementary school, it was designed by Homer in the Jacobethan style. This was followed the following year by the former South Kingstown High School in Wakefield. This was a more purely Tudor Revival design. Donated by the Hazard family of Peace Dale, it is now named for them. In 1912, the architects were commissioned to design Ranger Hall on the campus of the University of Rhode Island. It is a large but plain academic building, vaguely Jacobethan in design. Completing this group of educational commissions was McVickar Hall at St. Andrew's School in Barrington. This, the administration building for a former industrial school, is based on the Wakefield school, but uses a more rural English vocabulary.

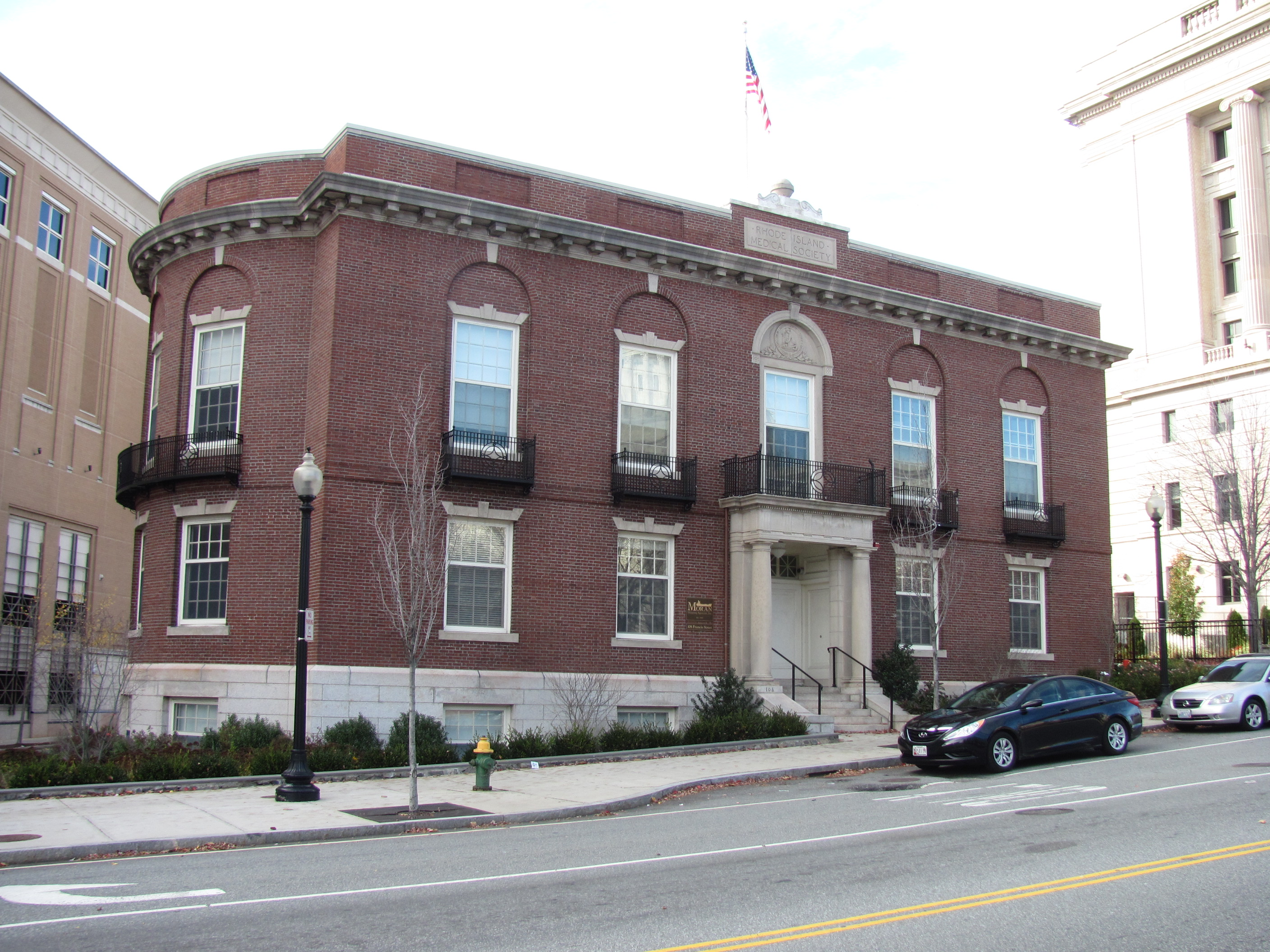
Rhode Island Medical Society (1911), Providence

They also designed several buildings more commercial in nature. In 1911 they built the Blackstone Hotel on Westminster Street in Providence. Like many early twentieth century hotels, it is designed in a red brick Beaux-Arts manner. It is today known as the Hotel Providence. That same year, they built a library and clubhouse for the Rhode Island Medical Society. It has been occupied as commercial space for several years. In 1912, they designed a building for the Peoples Savings Bank on Market Square. This building, now owned by Rhode Island School of Design, is a typical Classical, temple-front bank. It was completed in 1913. In 1949, the bank moved to a new building on Kennedy Plaza, designed by Cram & Ferguson.

Residential commissions remained an important part of the firm's work. Two important houses are that for Ella R. M. Phillips (1909, 236 George Street) and Mary B. L. Steedman (1912, 271 Angell Street), both Colonial Revival houses on Providence's east side. Also, in 1911, Eleazer Homer built himself a house at 270 Blackstone Boulevard. That house, like other known Homer designs, is heavily influenced by English architecture. This one, specifically, looks to the Arts and Crafts movement.

Other designs include:

- William McDonald, Jr. House, 188 Blackstone Boulevard, Providence (1907)
- Frank M. MacLeod House, 290 Irving Avenue, Providence (1909–10)
- Annie C. Barker House, 44 Orchard Ave., Providence (1910–11)
- George L. Miner House, 276 Blackstone Blvd., Providence (1910)
- Otis Randall House, 65 Weymouth St., Providence (1912)

=== Clarke & Howe, 1913-1928 ===
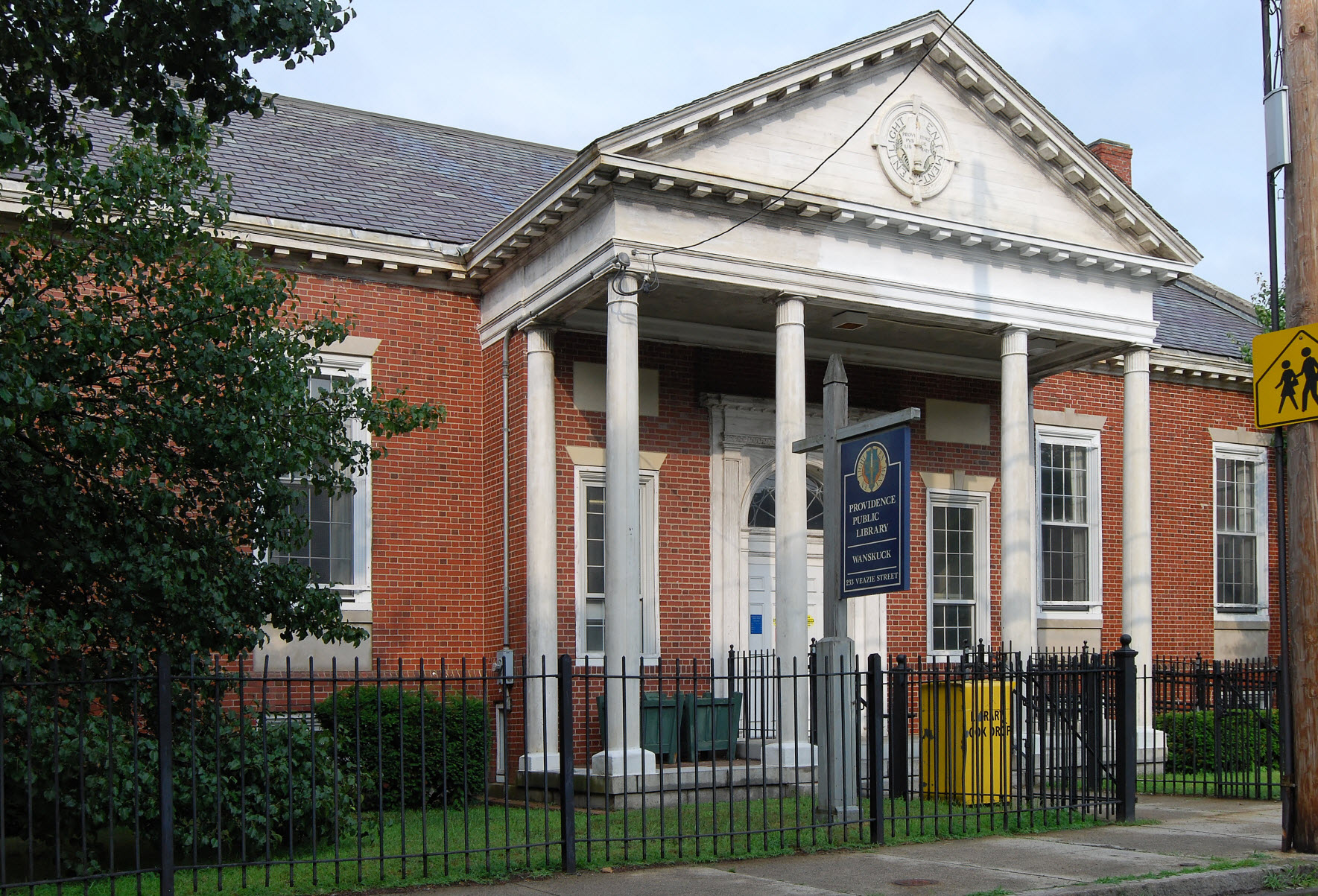
Wanskuck Branch Library (1926–28), Providence

Before the breakup of Clarke, Howe & Homer, the Newport Public Library hired the firm to design their new quarters. As Clarke & Howe, the firm remodeled the noted Edward King House, a large Italianate mansion designed by Richard Upjohn. The library later moved into a purpose-built building, and the King house is now a senior center. Two years later, in 1915, they designed St. Elizabeth's Home on Melrose Street in Providence, another Jacobethan production. Also in 1915 they were hired to design a house for Howe's old fraternity at Lehigh University in Bethlehem, Pennsylvania. The resulting building, Briarfield House, is a Tudor Revival design, complemented by a wooded site. It was completed in 1922. In 1925, they designed the Guiteras Memorial School in Bristol. The conservative Classical design was based on a Greek Revival house that had recently burned. During the 1920s, Clarke & Howe was commissioned by the Providence Public Library to design a standard design for the city's branch libraries. Only the Wanskuck Branch Library (1926–28) on Veazie Street was built to that original plan. Howe later designed several other branches, but to different designs each time. Also in 1926, they designed for St. Andrew's School a new building called Gardner Hall. The architects also designed the now-demolished Marvel Gymnasium for Brown University in 1927.

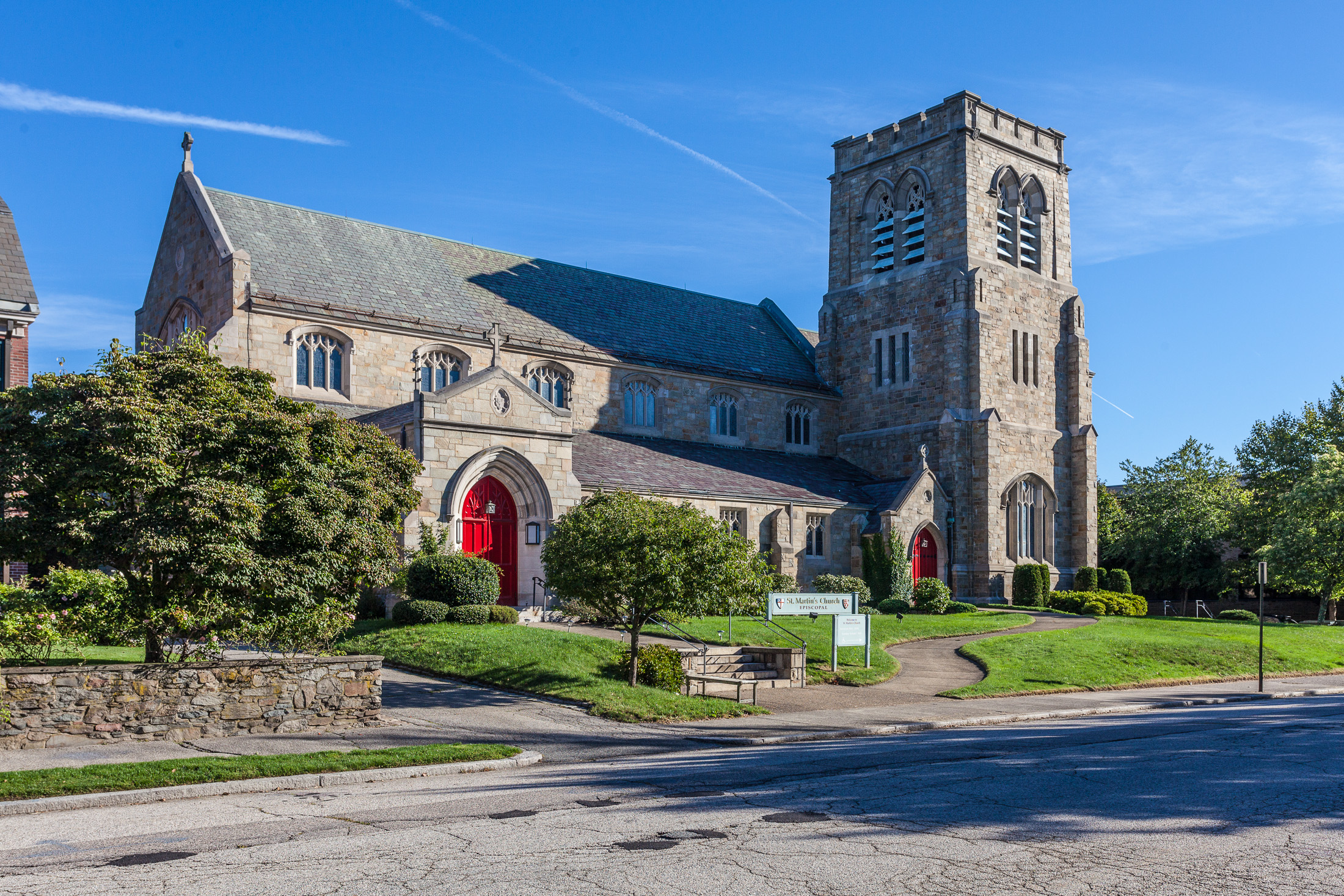
St. Martin's Episcopal Church (1916–17), Providence

During this latter period, they designed several churches. In 1916 they built St. Martin's Episcopal Church, all told one of their most important commissions. The prototype for the church was a typical English village church, a common source for a great deal of American churches. In 1925, they would add a parish house to the rear of the church. They designed another Providence church, the Church of the Redeemer, on Hope Street in 1917. In 1920, they completed the spire of St. Luke's in East Greenwich. The church itself was designed in 1878 by A. R. Esty. In 1922–23, they built St. George's on Clinton Street in Central Falls. Their final church commission was in 1928, when they designed a new sanctuary for the Fourth Baptist Church of Providence. The new building was built on Hope Street, placed alongside the old church, which became a parish house. The church is now occupied by the Mt. Hope Community Baptist Church.

The firm continued to receive several commissions for commercial buildings, including one of Providence's first skyscrapers: the Telephone Building. Built in 1917 as the headquarters of the Providence Telephone Company. it is eight stories tall, and was the tallest commercial building outside of the financial district. In 1920, they designed the central branch of Citizens Savings Bank at Hoyle Square. A third large building was the Providence Gas Company Building, at 100 Weybosset Street, built in 1924. This office building is especially noted for its distinctive ogee gable, first used in Rhode Island on the Joseph Brown House.

Clarke & Howe also designed many large residences during this period. The first of these was that for Edward I. Watson (1915), at 140 Nayatt Road in Barrington. This was a large, Colonial Revival summer residence for a Providence businessman. In the 1920s, they continued to design large houses, including a large number in Providence. These included those for Thomas A. Francis (1922, 156 Hope Street), Frank B. Lisle (1923, 59 Manning Street), Archie W. Merchant (1924, 48 Barberry Hill), and Paul C. DeWolf (1925, 25 Freeman Parkway). These all showed different variants of Colonial Revival design as it developed through the 1920s. Also, in 1926, they designed a stern, brick Jacobethan house for Alfred M. Coats at 175 Upton Avenue.

Other designs include:

- James Davenport House, 25 George Street, Providence (1914)
- Arnold Laboratory, Brown University, Providence (1915)
- Irene M. Butler House, 59 George Street, Providence (1915)
- Laurel Hill Avenue Grammar School, Laurel Hill Ave. & Cleveland Street, Providence (1916)
- John Post Reynolds School, High & Court Streets, Bristol (1916)
- Farm Group, Colt Farm (Samuel P. Colt estate), Bristol (1917)
- Hugh F. MacColl House, 152 Grotto Avenue, Providence (1918)
- Charles B. Rockwell, Jr. House, 2 High Street, Bristol (1924)

== Gallery ==
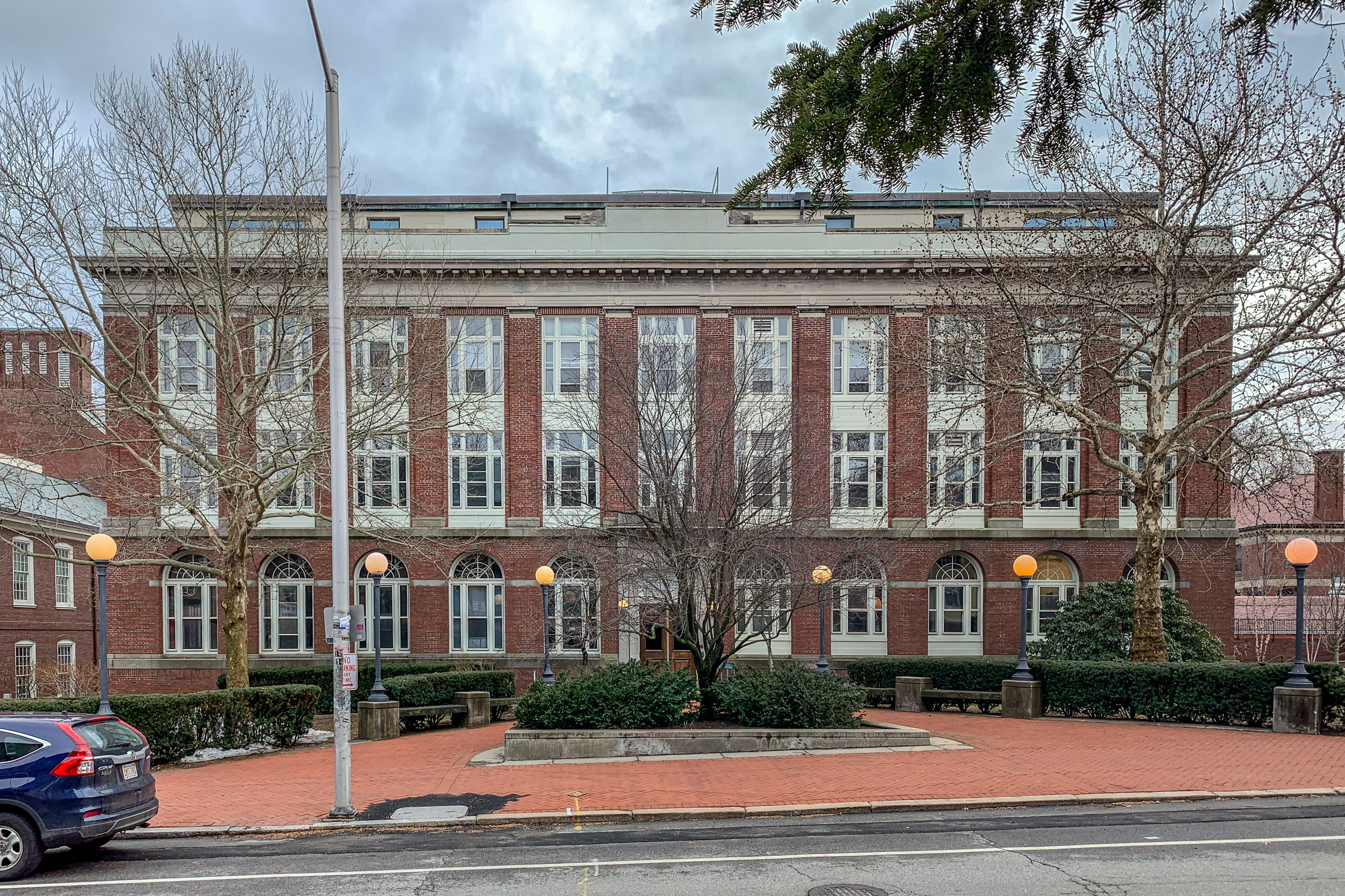
Arnold Laboratory (1915), Brown University, Providence

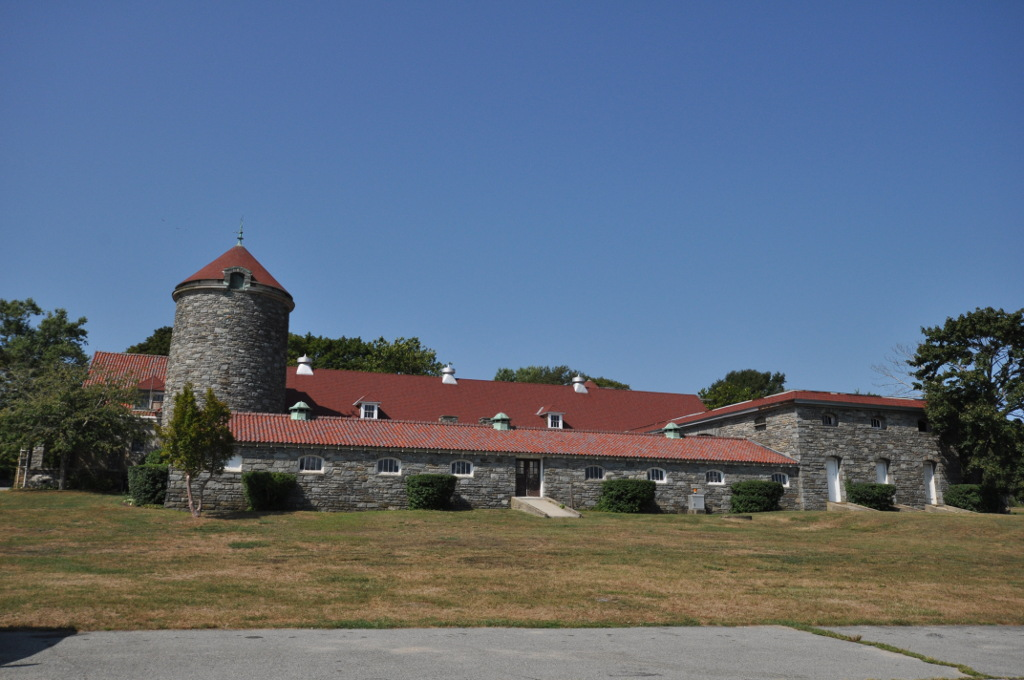
Farm Group (1917), Colt Farm, Bristol

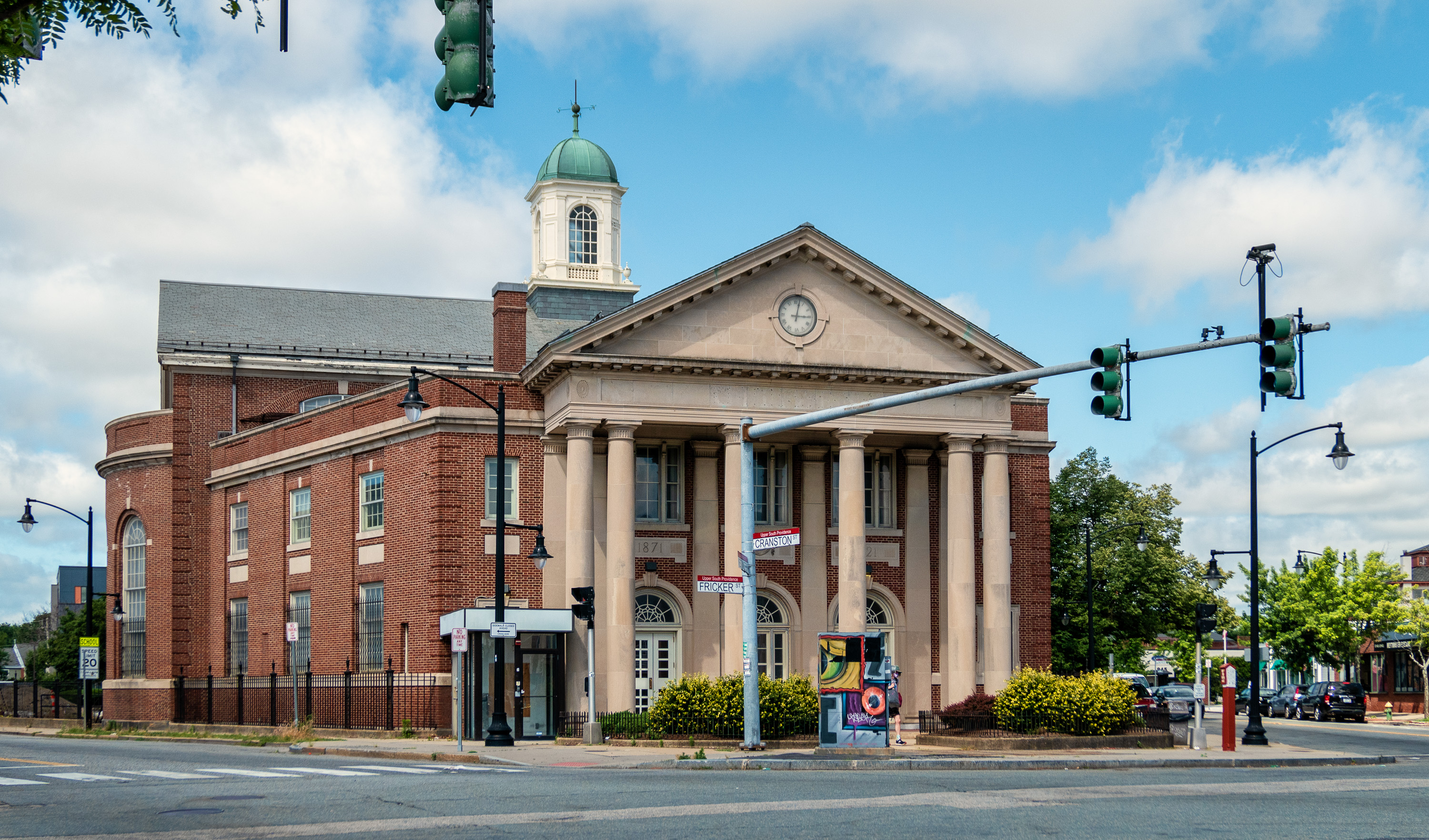
Citizens Savings Bank (1921), Providence
