= Rhode Island Medical Society Building =

- U.S. National Register of Historic Places
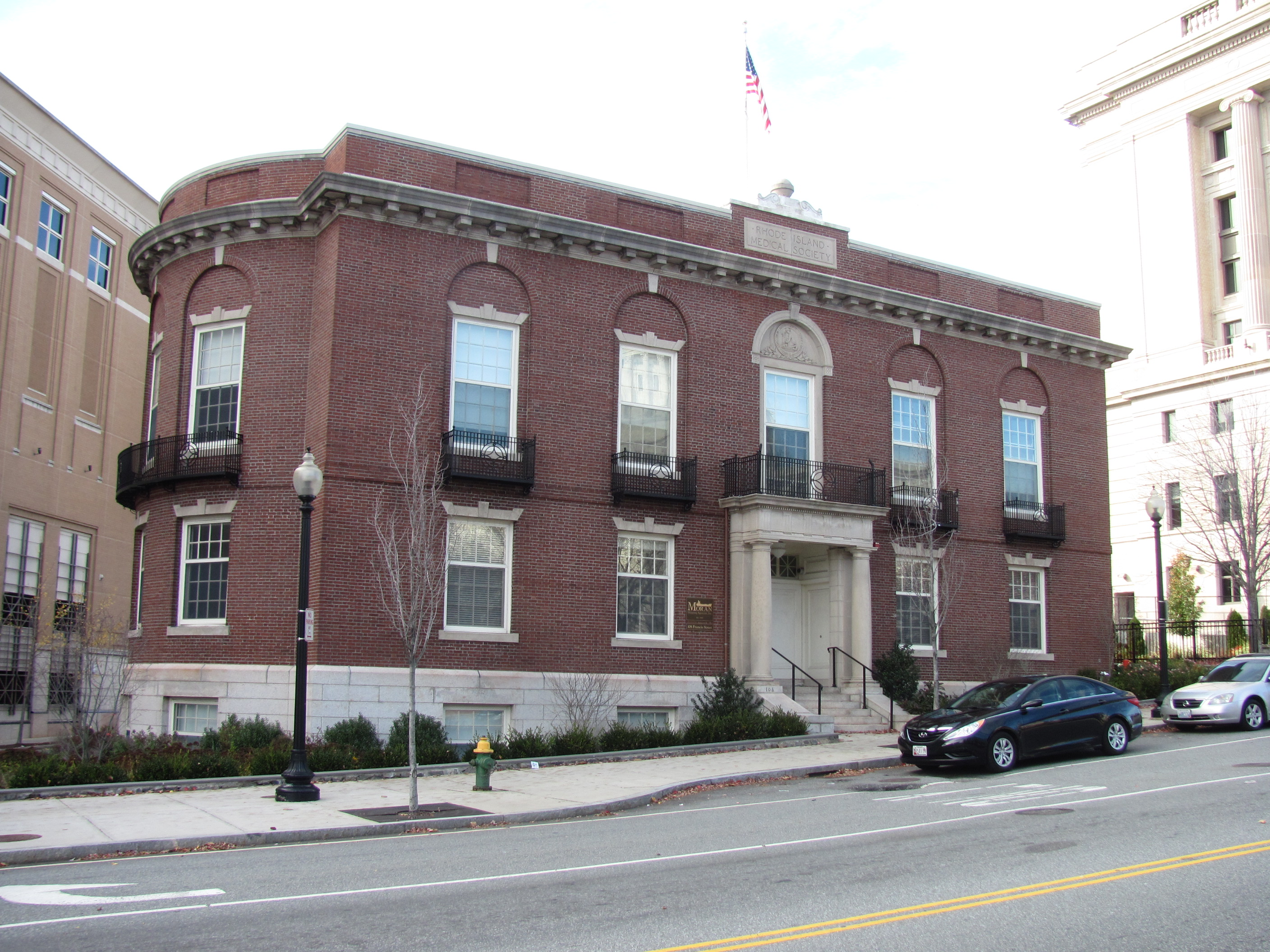
- Rhode Island Medical Society Building

- Location within Rhode Island Location within the United States
- Location: 106 Francis Street, Providence, Rhode Island
- Coordinates: 41°49′46″N 71°25′0″W
- Built: 1911
- Architect: Clarke, Howe & Homer
- Architectural style: Colonial Revival
- NRHP reference No.: 84002043
- Added to NRHP: June 4, 1984

The Rhode Island Medical Society Building is a historic commercial building in Providence, Rhode Island. It is a two-story brick Federal Revival building, designed by Clarke, Howe & Homer, and built in 1911–12. It has a five-bay main facade and a bowed south-facing bay. The main entrance is recessed under a cast-stone entryway. The Rhode Island Medical Society was founded in 1812, and is one of the oldest medical societies in the nation. The building served as their headquarters from 1912 to 2002. The building was renovated in 2010 and is now occupied by Moran Shipping Agencies Inc.

== See also ==
- National Register of Historic Places listings in Providence, Rhode Island
