= Rhode Island Medical Society =

- Abbreviation: RIMS
- Formation: 1812
- Founder: Amos Throop
- Location: Providence, RI
- Coordinates: 41.829793°N 71.424875°W
- President: Sarah Fessler
- Website: www.rimedicalsociety.org

Rhode Island Medical Society is a medical society founded in 1812. It is the eighth oldest state medical society in the United States.

They have published the Rhode Island Medical Journal since 1917.

From 1912 to 2002, their headquarters was located in the Rhode Island Medical Society Building in Providence, Rhode Island.
