= Saint Martin's Church (Providence, Rhode Island) =

Historic church in Rhode Island, United States

- U.S. National Register of Historic Places
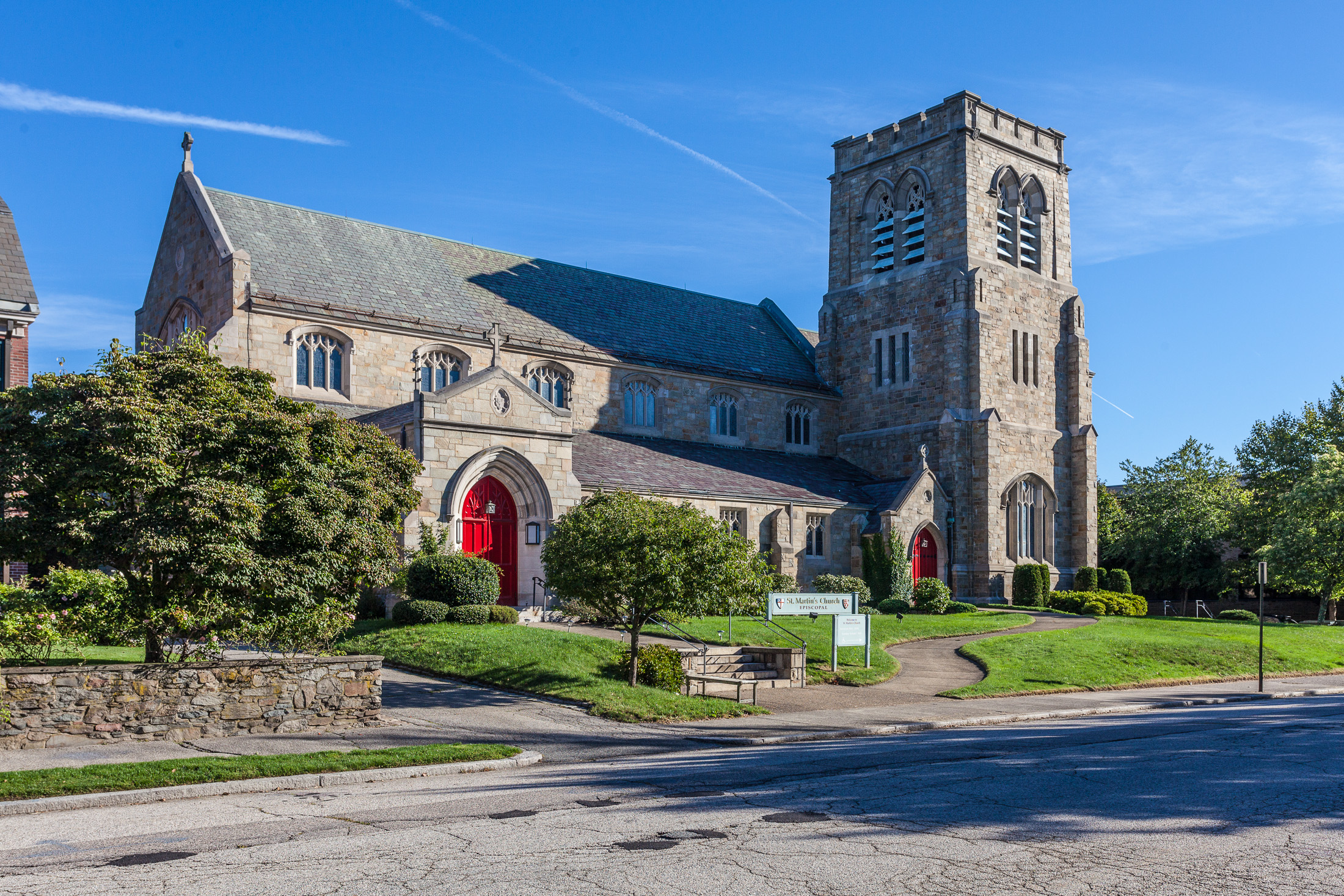

- Location within Rhode Island Location within the United States
- Location: Providence, Rhode Island
- Coordinates: 41°49′55″N 71°23′10″W
- Built: 1917; 109 years ago
- Architect: Clarke & Howe
- Architectural style: Late Gothic Revival
- NRHP reference No.: 96000571
- Added to NRHP: May 16, 1996

St. Martin's Church is a historic Episcopal Church (United States) church at 50 Orchard Avenue in Providence, Rhode Island. It is located next door to Temple Beth-El, a Reform Synagogue. The church reported 598 members in 2015 and 318 members in 2023; no membership statistics were reported nationally in 2024 parochial reports. Plate and pledge income reported for the congregation in 2024 was $505,515. Average Sunday attendance (ASA) in 2024 was 101 persons.

The congregation was established in 1885 and the Gothic Revival church building was constructed in 1917 to a design by Clarke & Howe to replace an earlier wooden building. It is a granite structure with a squat square three-stage tower at its southeast corner. The parish house, attached to the main building's northeast corner, is a Tudor Revival structure added in 1925.

The church was added to the National Register of Historic Places in 1996.

== Stained glass ==
The church features a stained glass window scene of namesake St. Martin cutting off half of his cloak to give to a beggar. The windows of the church were designed by Boston window designer Harry E. Goodhue and his wife, Mary, and installed in 1919. A restoration of the windows was undertaken by an Attleboro studio, New England Stained Glass, during the winter of 2014–2015. The entire window was removed from the wall, then individual pieces were removed, cleaned, reassembled, and re-leaded onto new metal frames.

== See also ==
- National Register of Historic Places listings in Providence, Rhode Island
