= Old Stone Bank =

Bank in Rhode Island, U.S.

Old Stone Bank Building
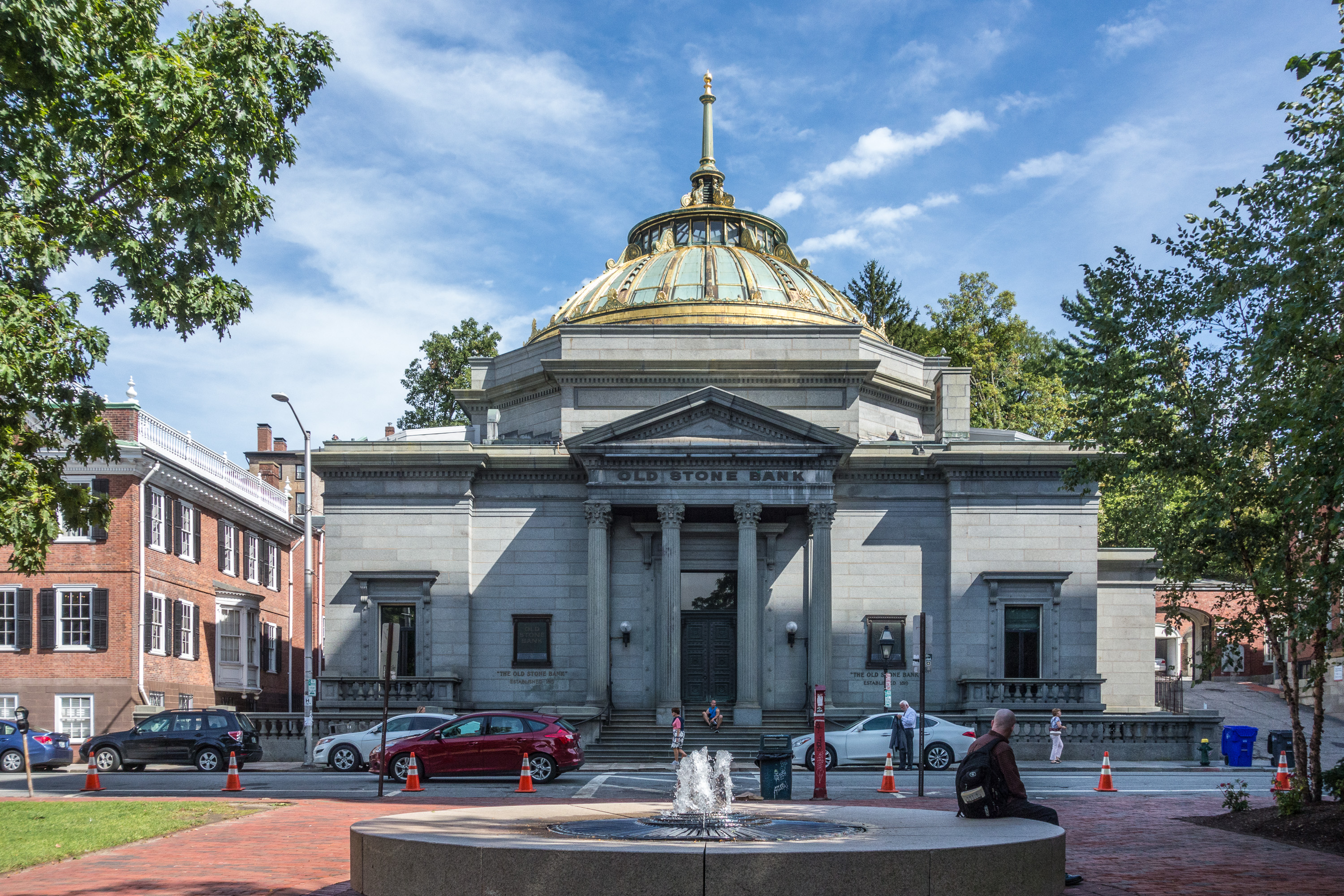
- Interactive map of the Old Stone Bank Building area

General information
- Location: 86 South Main St., Providence, Rhode Island
- Estimated completion: 1854

Technical details
- Material: Granite

Design and construction
- Architects: C.J. and R.J. Hall

Old Stone Bank
- Type: Public
- Traded as: Nasdaq: OSTN
- Industry: Savings & Loan
- Founded: 1819; 207 years ago in Providence, Rhode Island as Providence Institution for Savings
- Defunct: January 29, 1993; 33 years ago
- Fate: Insolvency
- Successor: Citizens Financial Group
- Headquarters: Providence, Rhode Island, US
- Area served: Rhode Island
- Parent: Old Stone Corporation

Old Stone Bank was a popular Rhode Island banking institution that was founded in Providence in 1819 as a mutual savings bank that was called Providence Institution for Savings.

The savings bank was the fourth largest bank in Rhode Island when it was declared insolvent by the Office of Thrift Supervision on January 29, 1993. Providence-based Citizens Bank acquired all of the savings bank's deposits the following year.

== History ==
In 1969, Old Stone Corporation was formed as the holding company for the savings bank.

In the early 1970s the bank adopted as its mascot and "spokesperson" cartoon character Fred Flintstone, who would say in commercials "Yabba-dabba-doo, love that Old Stone Bank!"

The bank's ATMs were called "Ready Freddy".

Old Stone Bank collapsed in the 1980s when the federal government convinced it to take over two failed savings and loan institutions, but reneged on its promise that it would not hurt the bank to do so.

In 1992, Old Stone filed a lawsuit against the government alleging breach of contract. They were awarded $192 million in 2004, but an appeals court reduced the award to 74.5 million, and the Supreme Court declined to hear a further appeal.

The savings bank was seized by the Office of Thrift Supervision on January 29, 1993. In July 1994, Providence-based Citizens Bank, a subsidiary of Citizens Financial Group, acquired all of the deposits and some of the offices of Old Stone from the Resolution Trust Corporation for $133.6 million. As a result of the merger, Citizens closed 11 of the 28 of the former Old Stone branches along with 7 Citizens branches since there was extensive branch overlaps with the two banking organizations.

=== Interstate expansion ===
In its first expansion move, Old Stone Corporation acquired the ailing Seattle, Washington-based Citizens Federal Savings and Loan Association for an undisclosed amount with the assistance of the Federal Savings and Loan Insurance Corporation. This federal bailout had cost the tax payers $78.7 million. The new acquisition was renamed Old Stone Bank of Washington. Five years later, Old Stone sold its Washington savings bank to Washington Mutual in June 1990 for $10 million.

== Old Stone Bank Building ==
The landmark Old Stone Bank Building, from which the bank derived its popular nickname and which housed the bank's flagship branch, is located on South Main Street in Providence. The granite edifice with a distinctive gold leaf, spired dome was designed by C.J. and R.J. Hall in 1854 and is a prime example of the style of bank architecture, prevalent from the mid-19th to the mid-20th Century, which communicated stability, strength and permanence.

It was sold by the Resolution Trust Corporation to Brown University for $1.15 million in 1995 to house the Haffenreffer Museum of Anthropology's collection of Native American artifacts. In 1999 Brown decided it was unfeasible to house the collection in the building as the necessary alterations would have altered the historic character of the building. In April 2009 Brown sold the building to Gold Dome Properties, LLC for $2.14 million. The building was converted into a single-family residence between 2015 and 2017.

=== Gallery ===
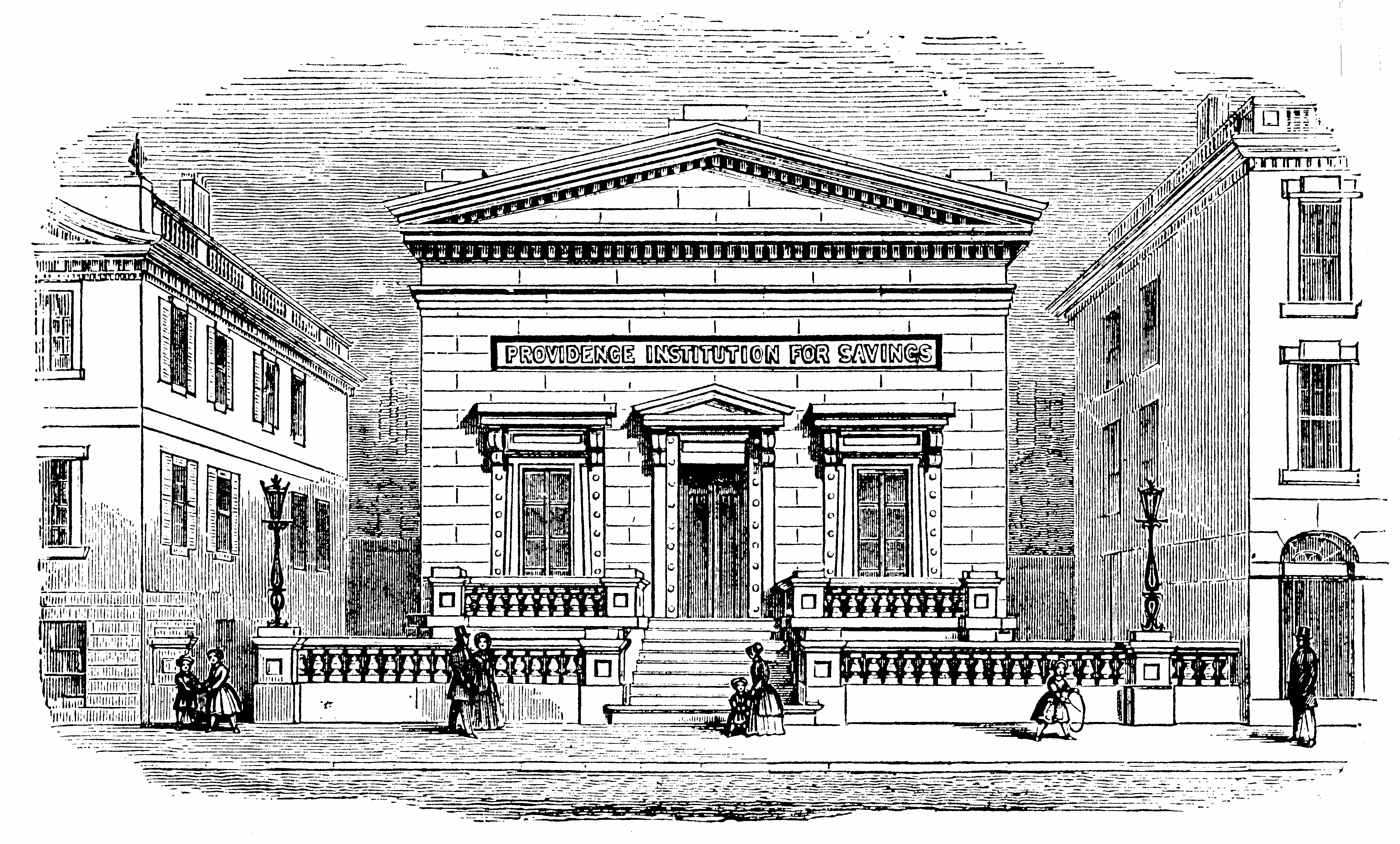
The building was originally constructed 1854

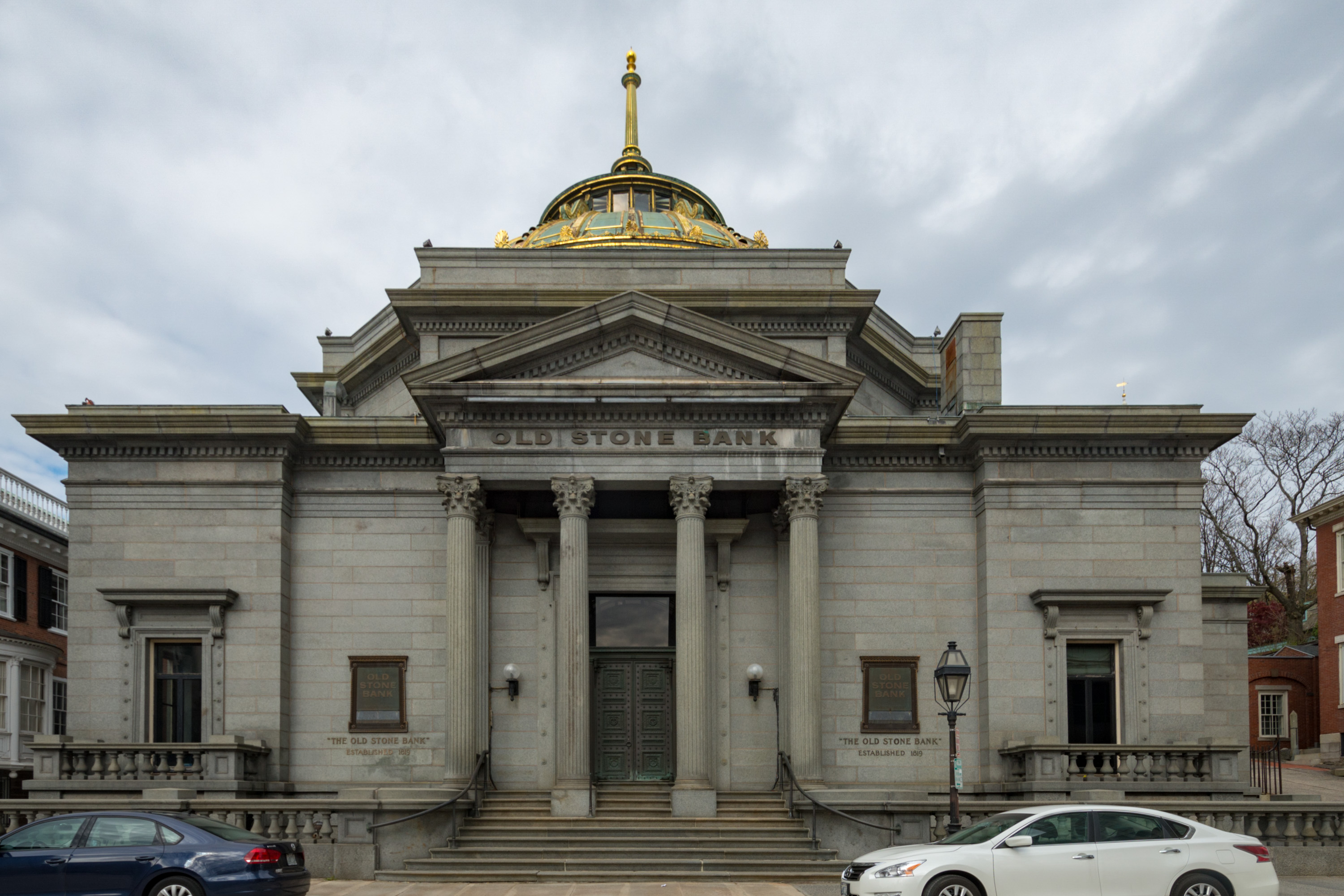
The structure as it appears today.
