= Poppasquash Farms Historic District =

Historic district in Rhode Island, United States

- U.S. National Register of Historic Places
- U.S. Historic district
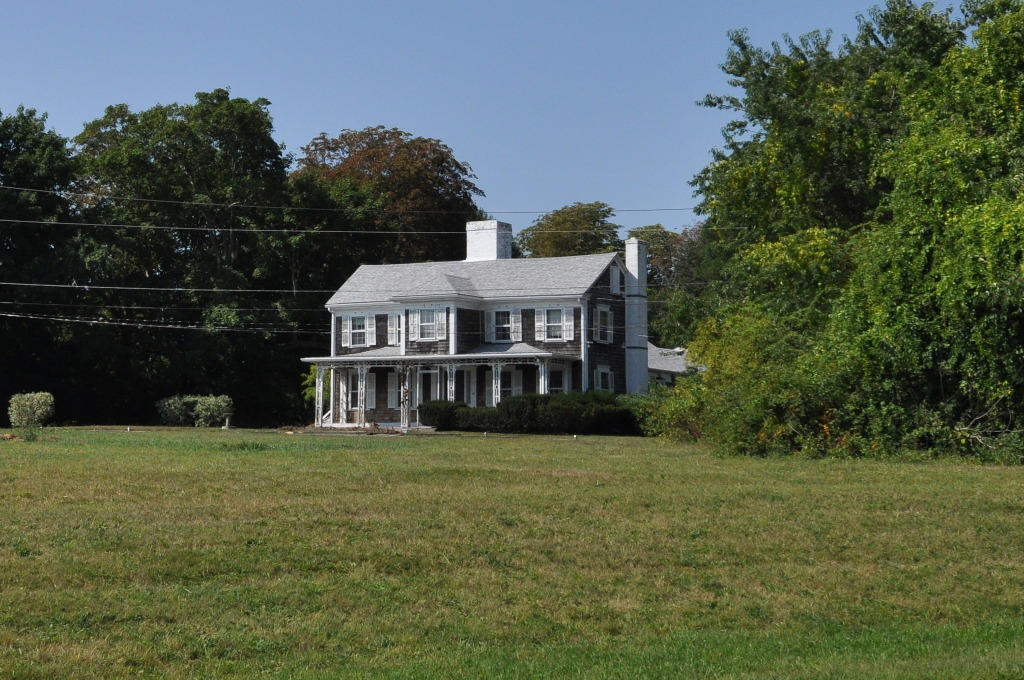
- House on Poppasquash Road

- Location within Rhode Island Location within the United States
- Location: Off RI 114, Bristol, Rhode Island
- Coordinates: 41°40′45″N 71°17′44″W
- Built: 1680
- Architect: Multiple
- Architectural style: Greek Revival, Colonial, Queen Anne
- NRHP reference No.: 80000075
- Added to NRHP: June 27, 1980

Poppasquash Farms Historic District is a historic district in Bristol, Rhode Island. It was added to the National Register of Historic Places in 1980.

The district is located off Route 114, and encompasses most of Colt State Park and about 50 acres (20 ha) of adjacent private lands on the northern half of Poppasquash Neck.

The area was occupied by Wampanoag Indians for hundreds of years and eventually settled by British colonists in the 17th century after King Philip's War. There is a broad array of architecture in the district including Greek Revival and Colonial houses.

== See also ==
- National Register of Historic Places listings in Bristol County, Rhode Island
