= Benjamin Church House (Bristol, Rhode Island) =

Historic house in Rhode Island, United States

- U.S. National Register of Historic Places
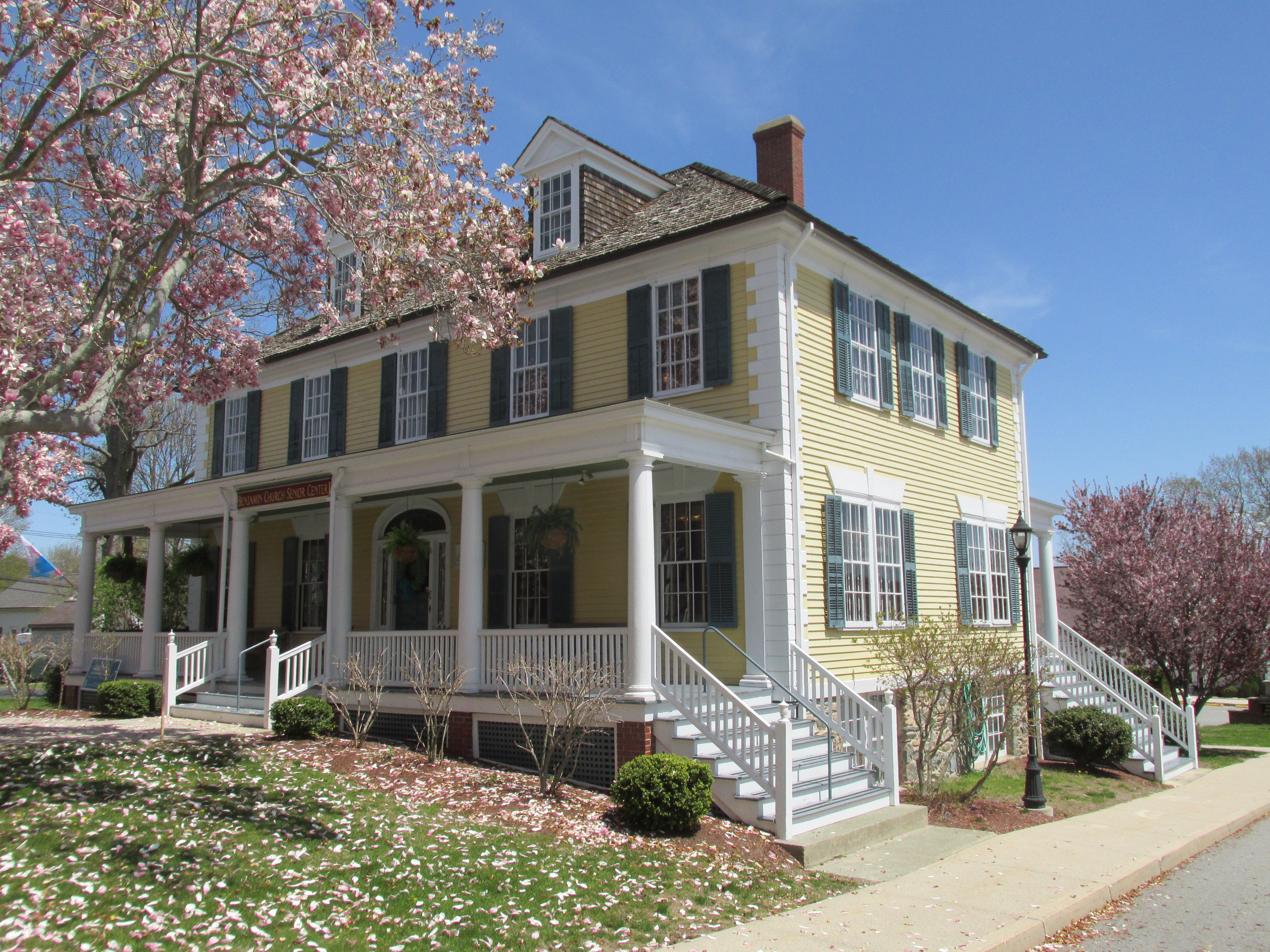
- Benjamin Church Senior Center

- Location within Rhode Island Location within the United States
- Location: Bristol, Rhode Island
- Coordinates: 41°41′9″N 71°16′43″W
- Built: 1908
- Architect: Clarke, Howe & Homer
- Architectural style: Colonial Revival
- NRHP reference No.: 71000011
- Added to NRHP: September 22, 1971

Benjamin Church House (also known as Benjamin Church Home for the Aged) is a Colonial Revival house at 1014 Hope Street in Bristol, Rhode Island, U.S.A. It opened in 1909 as the "Benjamin Church Home for Aged Men" as stipulated by Benjamin Church's will. Beginning in 1934, during the Great Depression, it admitted women. The house was closed in 1968 and became a National Register of Historic Places listing in 1971. The non-profit Benjamin Church Senior Center was incorporated in June 1972 and opened on September 1, 1972. It continues to operate as a senior center.

== Benjamin Church ==
Benjamin Church was born on February 20, 1842, to Elizabeth Luther and Samuel Church, a wealthy grain and flour merchant. Benjamin was raised with his 12 siblings on Mount Hope Farm and the old family farm on Poppasquash. His two brothers built houses in the Poppasquash Farms Historic District. In 1900, Benjamin Church drafted a will to provide for the construction of a home for elderly men. It opened in 1909 as the "Benjamin Church Home for Aged Men".

== Design ==
The Benjamin Church House is a two-story clapboarded Colonial Revival topped with a hipped roof that has four pedimented dormers. Constructed between 1908 and 1909 from designs by Clarke, Howe & Homer, architects, the building cost $21,000. The front of the house faces west towards Hope Street and is 18 by 30 feet (5.5 by 9.1 m) and has an ell on the rear side that measures 18 by 24 feet (5.5 by 7.3 m). The front facade has a symmetrical five bay facade with the main entrance in the center, the door has sidelights and a semi-elliptical fanlight. The front windows are typical 20th-century windows with six-over-one sash and have splayed wooden lintels and those on the first floor have raised center keystones. Projecting out from the hipped roof are two dormers with shingled sides. The front facade has a one-story porch that runs the length of the face with a half-hipped roof. The porch is supported by six Doric columns that frame the bays and has a wooden frieze with a triglyph above each column. The porch has a simple wooden rail that runs the length of the porch and down the front and side steps, the newel posts are capped by small wooden urns. The corners of the main part of the house have wooden quoins. In the southeast corner of the building is an internal porch covered by a quarter-hipped roof. The rear roof are two pedimented dormers, one on each side of the ell's roof and the third chimney which rises through the roof of the main building. The house has a stone foundation, which extends to a full story due to the sloping land and has a doorway in the rear. The porch is supported by brick piers.

The interior of the house is designed around a central hall with a narrow stairway with turned balusters and newel that goes to the third floor. On both sides of the hall are two large front reception rooms, each 14 by 19 feet (4.3 by 5.8 m) and having 9 feet (2.7 m) tall ceilings. The rear of the south front room is the former dining room that is connected by a pantry to the kitchen in the ell. Two small rooms are located beyond the northern reception room. The second floor maintains the central hall and extends into the ell, but is bisected by a lateral hallway. Each "quadrant" housed two rooms for the residents with additional rooms in the ell and the third floor has four additional bedrooms with the dormer windows. The third floor of the ell was used as attic storage space. At the time of nomination to the National Register of Historic Places, the alterations that had been made to the house were described as "minor and inconspicuous, consisting mainly of alterations to windows and dormers to provide egress to necessary fire-escapes." The porch is believed to be a part of the original design, but it was noted that if it was a later addition it would likely have been done before 1920. In 1969, the clapboarded outbuilding to the southeast was torn down to construct newer housing for the elderly.

== Service ==
The Benjamin Church House was ready to open on March 15, 1909, and served as elderly housing for only aged men. In 1934, during the Great Depression, the board of trustees decided to admit women to the house. Samuel P. Colt would bequeath $25,000 to the home upon his death in 1921. The house was closed from 1968 until 1973 and vandalized during the period, but was also submitted and approved to the National Register of Historic Places. Sometime in 1972, the National Park Service approved a grant of $5,000 to refurbish the house. In June 1972, "[t]he Benjamin Church Senior Center was incorporated as a non-profit organization that was housed in [t]he Benjamin Church Home" and opened for occupancy on September 1, 1972. According to the Benjamin Church Senior Center, the house is used as a senior center and is run by volunteers and board members.

== Importance ==
The Benjamin Church House is historically significant as a "very pure example" of the Colonial Revival style by noted local architects Clarke, Howe & Homer. The house also serves as an important asset to the Bristol environment as an elderly home, noted during its vacancy at the time of its nomination. The nomination states "[i]t is because of the environmental and architectural importance of this house and its significance in the greater context of the Bristol-Warren historic districts that it is thought to be worthy of National Register status and protection." It was added to the National Register of Historic Places on September 22, 1971.

== See also ==
- National Register of Historic Places listings in Bristol County, Rhode Island
- National Register of Historic Places listings in Rhode Island
