= Colt State Park =

State park in Bristol, Rhode Island

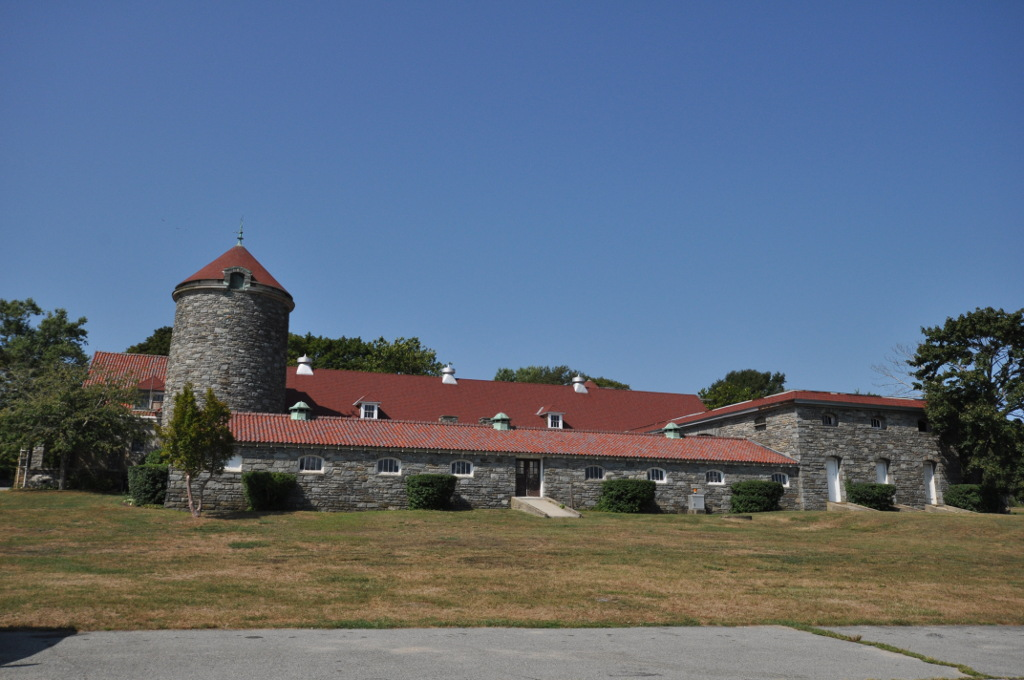
- Main building

- Location within Rhode Island
- Interactive map of Colt State Park
- Location: Bristol, Rhode Island, United States
- Coordinates: 41°40′40″N 71°17′50″W
- Area: 464 acres (188 ha)
- Elevation: 20 ft (6.1 m)
- Established: 1965
- Named for: Samuel P. Colt
- Administrator: Rhode Island Department of Environmental Management, Division of Parks & Recreation
- Website: Official website
- Rhode Island State Parks

Colt State Park is a public recreation area that occupies 464 acres (188 ha) on Poppasquash Neck in the town of Bristol, Rhode Island, once owned by industrialist Samuel P. Colt, nephew of firearms manufacturer Samuel Colt. The park is a major component of the Poppasquash Farms Historic District, listed on the National Register of Historic Places, and is a stop on the East Bay Bike Path. The park includes trails, picnic groves, boat ramps, an observation tower, and an open air Chapel-by-the-Sea.

== History ==
Beginning in 1905, Samuel P. Colt purchased and consolidated the Chase, Church and Van Wickle farms. He built a summer house, the "Casino," on the grounds as well as a magnificent stone barn to accommodate a prize herd of Jersey cattle. The summer house was demolished in the 1960s while the stone cow barn survives.

A pair of life-size bull statues, named Conrad and Pomeroy, stand guard at the main entrance gate on Hope Street. The marble bases which support the bronze bulls are believed to have been modeled after the approach gates to French King Louis XV's château Petit Trianon at Versailles and were unveiled in 1913. The gate bears the inscription: "Colt Farm. Private Property, Public Welcome."

At Colt's death in 1921, the lands passed to his Industrial Trust Company. According to the provisions of Colt's will, the farm was to remain open to the public in perpetuity. Over the years, the grounds suffered from vandalism, and a number of statues were destroyed or stolen. Many of Colt Park's statues were relocated to Linden Place for safe keeping.

In 1965, the State of Rhode Island took over Colt Farm via eminent domain, and on August 21, 1968, the lands were dedicated as Colt State Park by Rhode Island Governor John Chafee. A statue of Chafee was erected in the park in 2003.

== Activities and amenities ==
The park offers trails for hikers, joggers, bicyclers and equestrians, a skate park, and facilities for picnicking, and boating. The park's fishing pier, built in the 1980s, was reconstructed and expanded in 2014 to provide four handicap-accessible stations for fishing from a wheelchair.

== Gallery ==
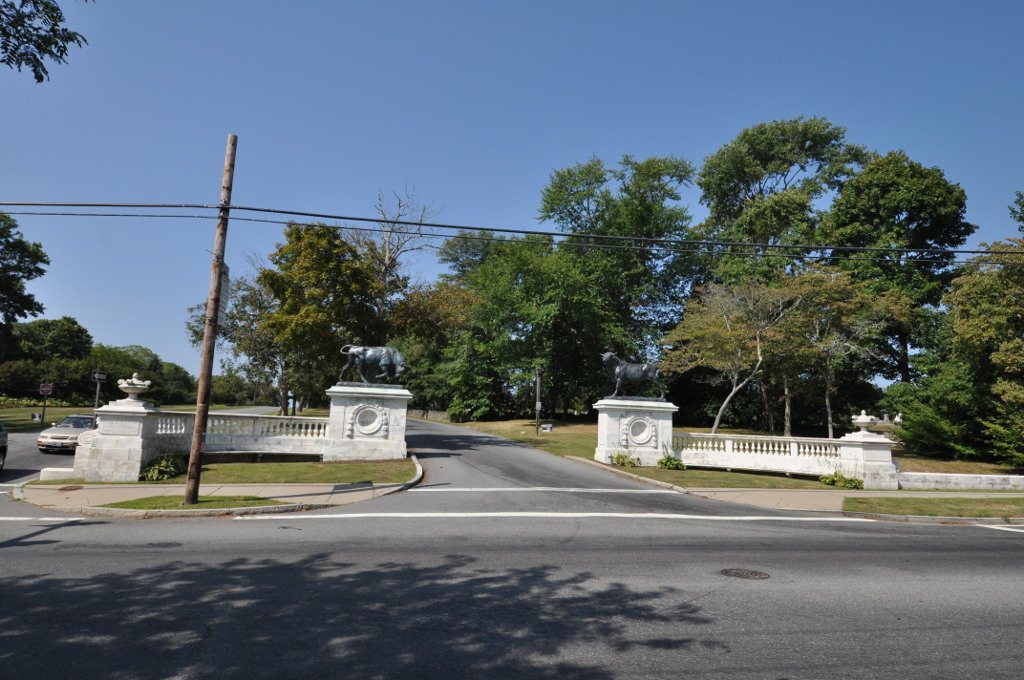
The bulls at the Hope Street entrance

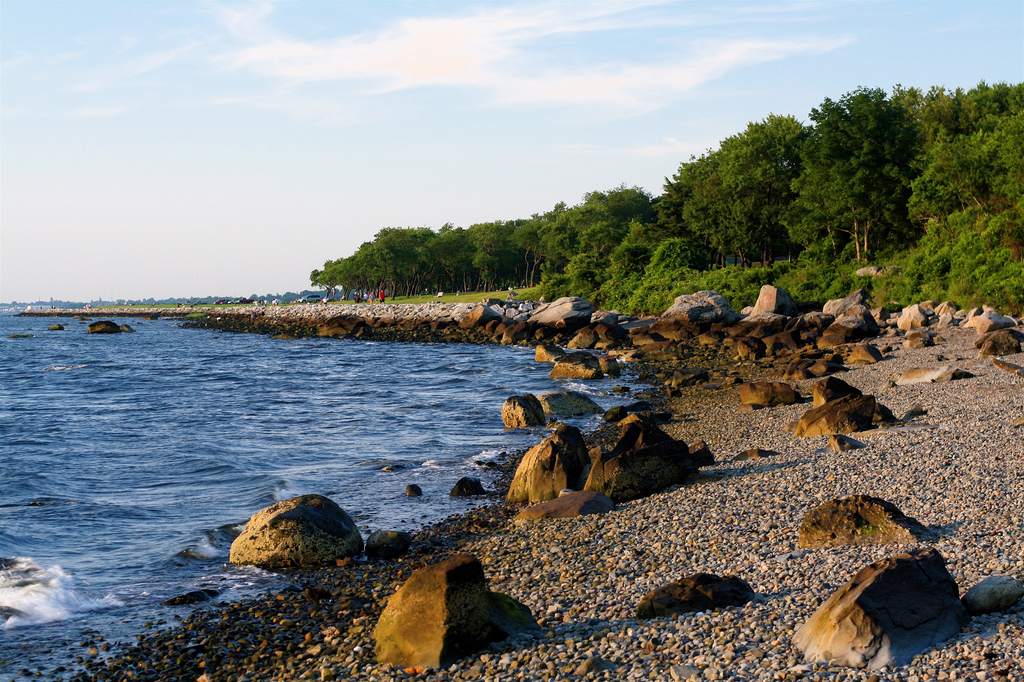
Shoreline at the park
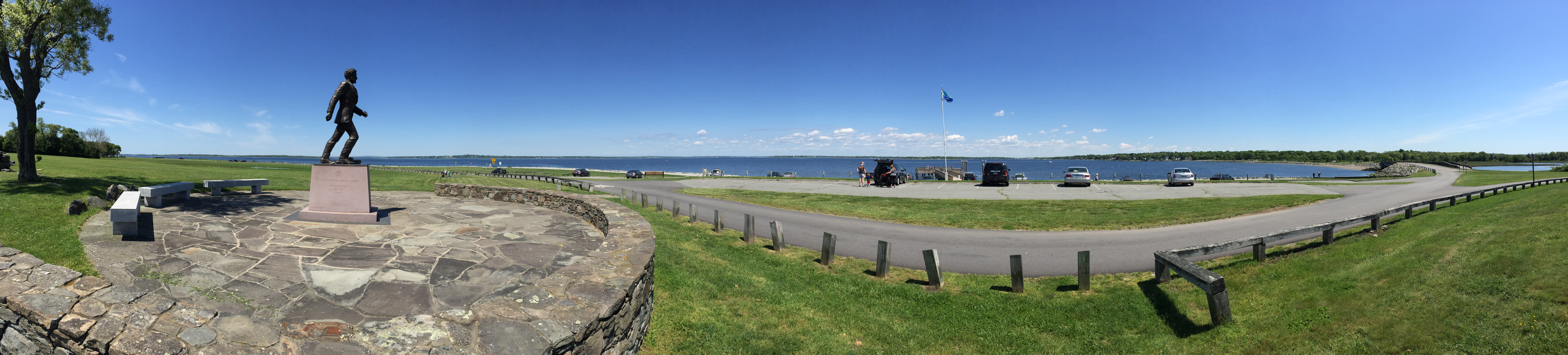
The statue of John Chafee looks out over Colt State Park
