= List of libraries in Rhode Island =

This is a list of public and private and university libraries in Rhode Island, USA.

Library	Web site	Town/City	County	Consortium
Adams Library		Providence	Providence	Rhode Island College library
Adams Public Library		Central Falls	Providence	Ocean State Libraries
Annmary Brown Memorial		Providence	Providence	Brown University library
Ashaway Free Library		Ashaway	Washington	Ocean State Libraries
Barrington Public Library		Barrington	Bristol	Ocean State Libraries
Brown University Libraries		Providence		Brown University library
Brownell Library		Little Compton	Newport	Ocean State Libraries
Clark Memorial Library		Richmond	Washington	Ocean State Libraries
Coventry Public Library		Coventry	Kent	Ocean State Libraries
Cranston Public Library		Cranston	Providence	Ocean State Libraries
Crompton Free Library		West Warwick	Kent	now used by Pawtuxet Valley Preservation and Historical Society
Cross Mills Public Library		Charlestown	Washington	Ocean State Libraries
Cumberland Public Library		Cumberland	Providence	Ocean State Libraries
Douglas and Judith Krupp Library		Smithfield	Providence	Bryant University library
East Greenwich Free Library		East Greenwich	Kent	Ocean State Libraries
East Providence Public Library		East Providence	Providence	Ocean State Libraries
East Smithfield Public Library		Smithfield	Providence	Ocean State Libraries
Exeter Public Library		Exeter	Washington	Ocean State Libraries
Foster Public Library		Foster	Providence	Ocean State Libraries
George Hail Free Library		Warren	Bristol	Ocean State Libraries
Glocester Manton Free Public Library		Glocester	Providence	Ocean State Libraries
Greenville Public Library (Rhode Island)		Greenville	Providence	Ocean State Libraries
Harmony Public Library		Glocester	Providence	Ocean State Libraries
Island Free Library		New Shoreham	Washington	Ocean State Libraries
Jamestown Philomenian Library		Jamestown	Newport	Ocean State Libraries
Jesse M. Smith Memorial Library		Burrillville	Providence	Ocean State Libraries
John Carter Brown Library		Providence	Providence	Brown University
John D. Rockefeller Jr. Library		Providence	Providence	Brown University library
John Hay Library		Providence	Providence	Brown University library
Kingston Free Library		Kingston	Washington	Ocean State Libraries
Langworthy Public Library		Hopkinton	Washington	Ocean State Libraries
Lincoln Public Library		Lincoln	Providence	Ocean State Libraries
Loutitt Library		West Greenwich	Kent	Ocean State Libraries
Marian J Mohr Memorial Library		Johnston	Providence	Ocean State Libraries
Maury Loontjens Memorial Library		Narragansett	Washington	Ocean State Libraries
McKillop Library		Newport	Newport	Salve Regina University library
Middletown Public Library		Middletown	Newport	Ocean State Libraries
Newport Historical Society		Newport	Newport	Newport Historical Society library
Newport Public Library		Newport	Newport	Ocean State Libraries
North Kingstown Free Library		North Kingstown	Washington	Ocean State Libraries
North Scituate Public Library		North Scituate	Providence	Ocean State Libraries
North Providence Public Library		North Providence	Providence	Ocean State Libraries
North Smithfield Public Library		North Smithfield	Providence	Ocean State Libraries
Pawtucket Public Library		Pawtucket	Providence	Ocean State Libraries
Peace Dale Public Library		South Kingstown	Washington	Ocean State Libraries
Phillips Memorial Library		Providence	Providence	Providence College library
Portsmouth Free Public Library		Newport	Newport	Ocean State Libraries
Providence Athenaeum		Providence	Providence	Providence Athenaeum private library
Providence Public Library		Providence	Providence	Ocean State Libraries
Redwood Library and Athenaeum		Newport	Newport	Private library, oldest library building in the U.S.
Rhode Island Historical Society		Providence	Providence	Rhode Island Historical Society library
Rhode Island Medical Society Library				
Robert Beverly Hale Library		South Kingstown	Washington	Ocean State Libraries
Robert L. Carothers Library		Kingston	Washington	University of Rhode Island research library
Rochambeau Library-Providence Community Library		Providence	Providence	Ocean State Libraries
Roger Williams University Library		Bristol	Bristol	Roger Williams University Library
Rogers Free Library		Bristol	Bristol	Ocean State Libraries
Sciences Library (Brown University)		Providence	Providence	Brown University library
Smith Hill Library-Providence Community Library		Providence	Providence	Ocean State Libraries
South Providence Library-Providence Community Library		Providence	Providence	Ocean State Libraries
Tiverton Public Library		Tiverton	Newport	Ocean State Libraries
Wanskuck Library-Providence Community Library		Providence	Providence	Ocean State Libraries
Warwick Public Library		Warwick	Kent	Ocean State Libraries
Westerly Library and Wilcox Park		Westerly	Washington	Ocean State Libraries
Woonsocket Harris Public Library		Woonsocket	Providence	Ocean State Libraries

== See also ==
- List of libraries in the United States
- Rhode Island Library Association
- Rhode Island Office of Library and Information Services
