= Providence Public Library =

Public library in Rhode Island, US

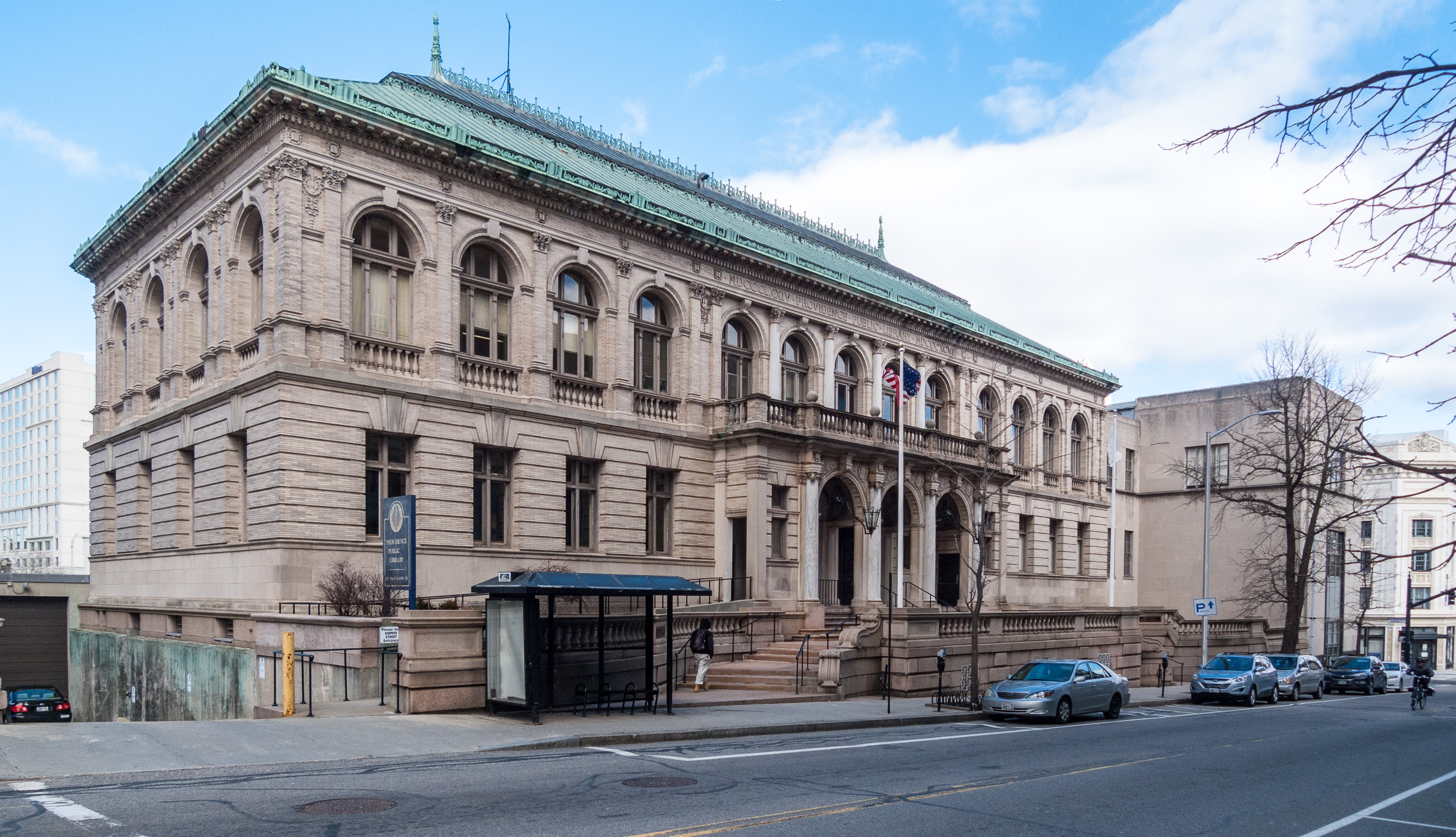
- Southeast face, original core building dating from 1900
- 41.822026°N 71.416879°W
- Location: 150 Empire Street, Providence, Rhode Island, United States
- Type: Public Library
- Established: 1875; 151 years ago

Collection
- Size: 1.43 million (2010)

Access and use
- Circulation: 618,730 (2018)
- Population served: 638,931 (2019)
- Members: 69,273 (2010)

Other information
- Website: www.provlib.org

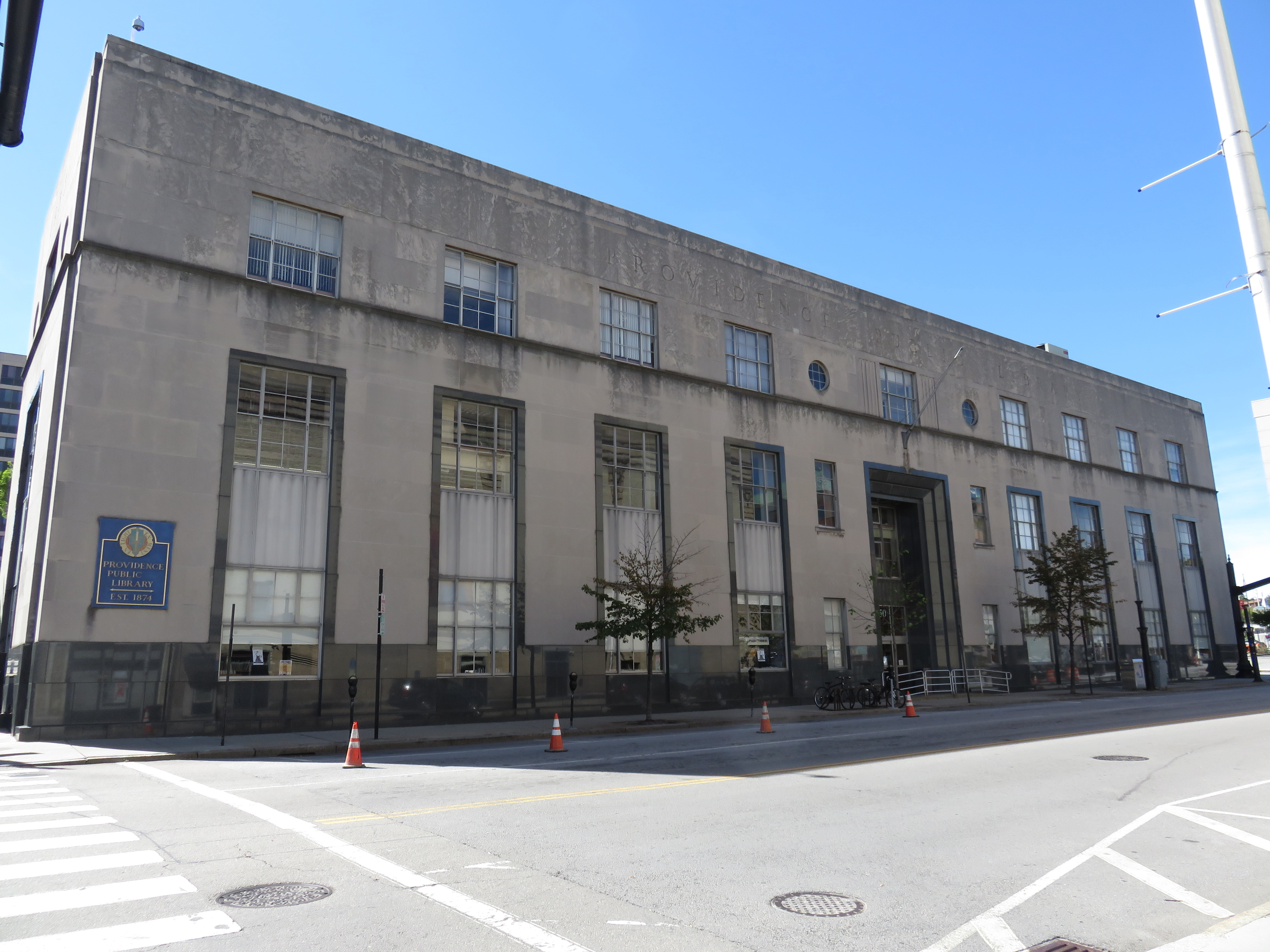
Northeast face on Empire Street, Addition in 1954

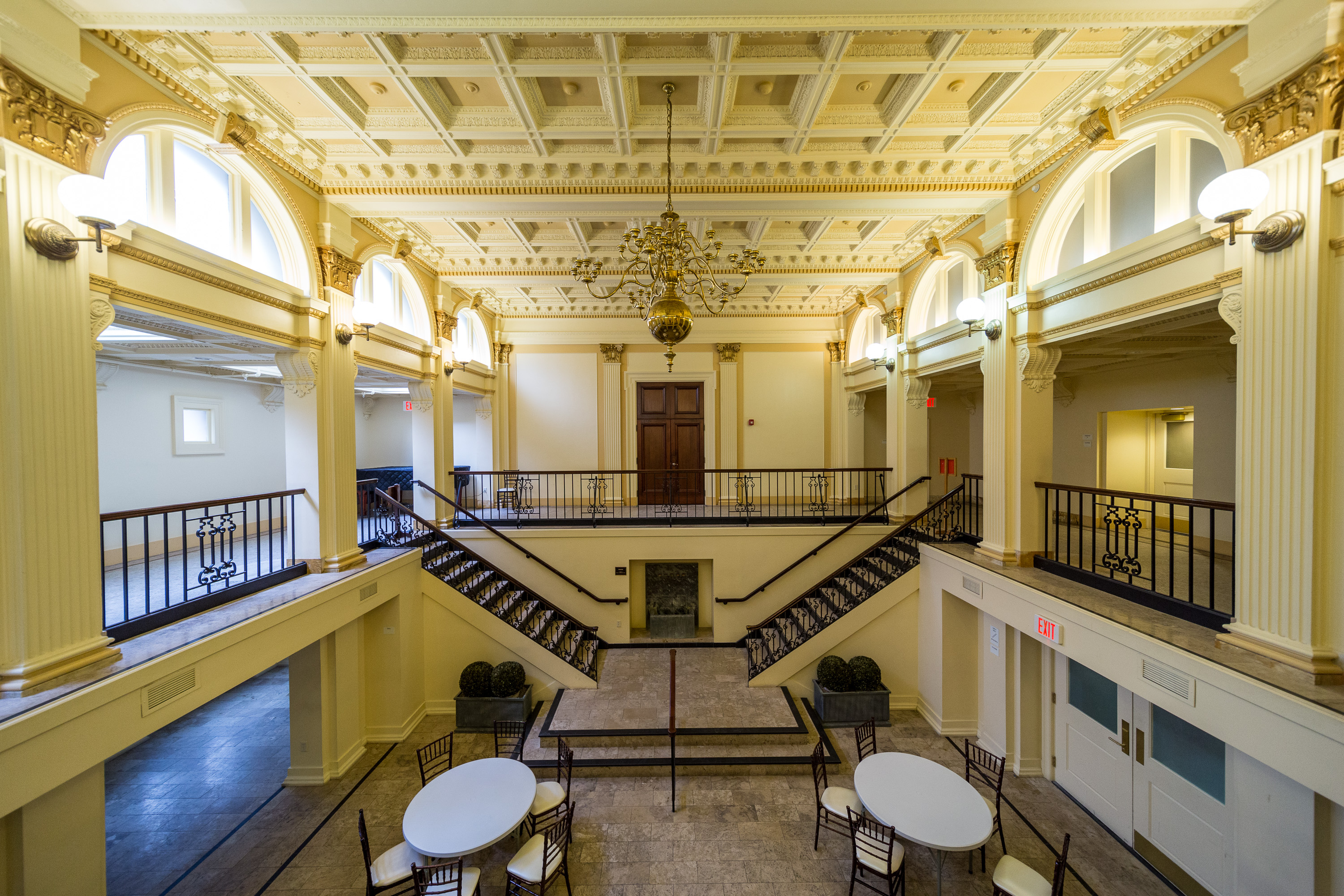
Library interior in 2019

Providence Public Library of Providence, Rhode Island was founded in 1875. The central library building at 225 Washington Street opened in 1900 and was constructed in a Renaissance style with private donations including a large donation from John Nicholas Brown I, and a large addition was built in 1954. The Library is different from most city libraries because it is governed by a board of trustees and funded privately but serves the public.

Providence Public Library was awarded the National Medal for Museum and Library Service in 2001, for outstanding service to their community.

== History ==
In June 1871, representatives from The Franklin Society, the Rhode Island Society for the Encouragement of Domestic Industry, The Franklin Lyceum, and the Association of Mechanics and Manufacturers met to form a Free Public Library, Art Gallery, and a Museum of Natural History, combining their private libraries. The library first opened in February 1878, on the second floor of the former Butler Exchange building at now Kennedy Plaza, and moved to a location at Snow Street, just two years later.

In 1896, the library broke ground on the current location at Washington Street, with a gift of $268,500 by John Nicholas Brown I, paying more than half the final cost of $387,000. Brown died just six weeks after the library opened March 1900. Opening with 93,000 volumes, the collection has since grown to over 1.4 million.

The library began the biggest library renovation in state history in 2019 at a cost of $25 million to renovate the Empire Street addition which was originally built in 1954.

== Collections ==
Providence Public Library is home to many specialty collections including World War I and II propaganda, Irish culture and literature, art, architecture, and more. The library also actively collects local historical items, such as maps, charts, newspapers, photographs, and family and neighborhood histories directly relating to Providence, and Rhode Island. An extensive collection of whaling and maritime items features 800 voyage log books, 550 blueprints and technical drawings, and 11 scale ship models created by Alfred S. Brownell who donated the collection in the 1950s.

The Caleb C. Harris Collection on the Civil War and Slavery, purchased in 1884, is the library's largest collection featuring over 10,000 books, pamphlets, manuscripts, ephemera, newspapers from the 18th century relating to slavery. Items include a large collection of translations of Uncle Tom's Cabin, and letters written home by Rhode Island soldiers during the Civil War.

The Updike Collection of printing started in 1910, with the encouragement and contribution of Daniel Berkeley Updike, the founder of Merrymount Press. The collection has grown to over 7,500 volumes, 600 letters, hundreds of prints, and type specimen books dating to the 16th century. The collection also contains three printing presses, punches and a type set.

Recently, as part of initiatives to make local collections more accessible, Brown University students and faculty helped brainstorm new approaches to community archives. In a course in Digital Public Humanities taught by Jim McGrath, students did “research and development work that was hard to fit into” the schedules of the Providence Public Library Special Collections team. While also working with the Updike Collection, the students focused on the Lou Costa Collection and the AS220 Collection. The Lou Costa collection consists of photographs and documents collected by Costa about his Fox Point community and the Cape Verdean immigrants who live there. The AS220 Collection was “a vast, newly acquired trove of institutional records, artwork, and documentation from Providence's famous community arts center. This project supported the PPL's interest in community archives.

== See also ==
- List of libraries in Rhode Island
- Rochambeau Library-Providence Community Library
- Smith Hill Library-Providence Community Library
- South Providence Library-Providence Community Library
- Wanskuck Library-Providence Community Library
