= Vladimir Luppian =

Vladimir Luppian (1892–1961) was a Russian painter. One of his lithographs, "The Third [Communist] International", was exhibited at the 'Views and Re-Views: Soviet Political Posters and Cartoons' exhibition at the Brown University Library from September 6 to October 19, 2008.
