= Slatersville Reservoir =

Reservoir in Rhode Island, U.S.

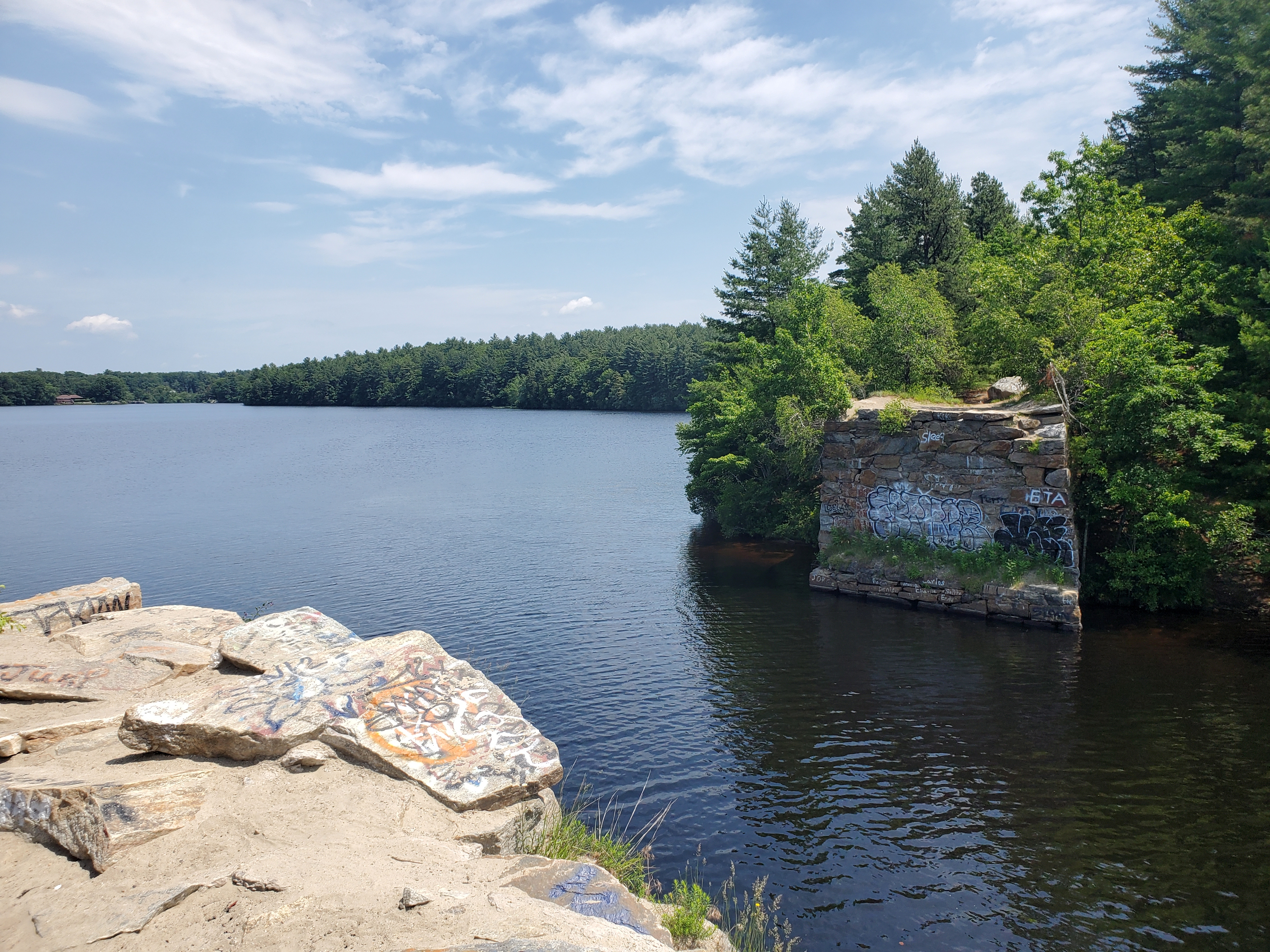
- Slatersville Reservoir in 2021, with abutments of the former Woonsocket and Pascoag Railroad bridge

- Location within Rhode Island Location within the United States
- Location: Slatersville, Providence County, Rhode Island
- Coordinates: 41°59′20″N 71°35′50″W
- Type: Artificial lake
- Surface area: 144 acres (58 ha)

Slatersville Reservoir is a large lake in the village of Slatersville in the town of North Smithfield in Providence County, Rhode Island.

The Slatersville Reservoir was created for use by the nearby Slater family's textile mills when a "larger dam, known as the Middle Dam, was built in 1849. It is 300 ft (91 m) long, and creates a twenty-foot (6.1 m) drop. Behind the dam is the 170 acres (69 ha) Lower Slatersville Reservoir. The smaller dam was built later to increase the water power. The sluice gate here controlled the amount of water flowing into the raceway that powered the Slatersville Mill." The two dams, which now create waterfalls, can be seen from the North Smithfield Public Library.

== See also ==
- List of lakes in Rhode Island
