= Rhode Island Office of Library and Information Services =

State library agency of Rhode Island

Coordinates: 41.8331°N 71.4154°W

Office of Library and Information Services

Agency overview
- Jurisdiction: State of Rhode Island
- Headquarters: One Capitol Hill; Providence, RI 02908
- Agency executive: Karen Mellor, Chief of Library Services
- Parent agency: Rhode Island Department of Administration
- Website: olis.ri.gov

The Rhode Island Office of Library and Information Services is the state library agency of Rhode Island, located in Providence, Rhode Island. It creates and maintains plans for library development statewide, administers the interlibrary loan program, and plans resource sharing to serve the libraries of the state. OLIS also offers services to the public including through the Talking Books Library, the Statewide Reference Resource Center (AskRI), and directories of government and library services in Rhode Island. The Library Board of Rhode Island, made up of citizens and representatives from all types of libraries and appointed by the Governor, advises OLIS.

Rhode Island also has a State Library which is a Federal Depository Library as well as a non-circulating library with a collection that is collection that is primarily legislation-related. It is housed inside the Rhode Island State House.

== History ==
The State Board of Education in Rhode Island was created in 1870 which disbursed some funds to public libraries. By 1935, the Rhode Island State Library was administering state aid for community libraries and library extension service. The Department of State Library Services (now OLIS) was founded in 1964 as a result of legislation initiated by the Rhode Island Library Association, taking over some of these roles from the State Library.

== See also ==
- List of libraries in Rhode Island
- List of libraries in the United States
