= M. Rosaria Piomelli =

Italian-born American architect

- Born: M. Rosaria Piomelli (Angrisano); October 24, 1937 (age 88); Naples, Italy
- Education: Massachusetts Institute of Technology
- Occupations: Architect, Professor
- Practice: Warner, Burns, Toan & Lunde; I.M. Pei & Partners, Architects
- Buildings: Sciences Library (Brown University); Pierson School in Tarrytown, New York

Maria Rosaria Piomelli (born Angrisano on October 24, 1937) is an Italian architect. She became the first woman to hold the position of dean at any architectural school in the United States when she was appointed dean of the CCNY School of Architecture in 1980.

== Early life ==
M. Rosaria Piomelli (née Angrisano) was born in Naples, Italy. She is the daughter of Alberto and Giuseppina (Trapanese) Angrisano. She received her education in Naples at the Istituto d'Arte, where she finished her Bachelor of Arts in 1954 and at the Accedemia d'Arte where she finished her Master of Arts in 1955. She also obtained her Bachelor of Architecture from the Massachusetts Institute of Technology in 1960. She came to the United States in 1957. She married Sergio Piomelli, a Doctor of Medicine April. She has two children, Ascanio Alberto and Fosca Francesca Piomelli.

== Career ==
Piomelli worked as a project architect in several offices in Italy, the United States and the Netherlands through the 1960s and 1970s. From 1963-1969 she worked for Warner, Burns, Toan & Lunde in New York City. From 1969-1970 she was an Associate architect at E.H. Grosmann Architect, in Rotterdam, Netherlands. From 1971 to 1974 she was a project architect for the firm I.M. Pei and Partners. She opened her own firm in New York City in 1974. Piomelli has worked as a professor and also served many terms at various positions in the United States. After earning her professional license to practice in New York in 1969, she joined the professional body of the American Institute of Architects. In her capacity as director of Equal Opportunity Committee for the American Institute of Architects, Piomelli organized an exhibition in New York City in the Spring of 1974 title "Women in the Design of the Environment." In fact, she has devoted herself broadly to promoting the work of women in the architecture field. She has also written books about the work of women in American architecture.

== Teaching ==
Since 1971 Piomelli has held academic positions at several institutions.

1971 to 1976: City College of New York (CCNY) School of Architecture, Adjunct Associate Professor

1974 to 1979: Pratt Institute, Chair of the Faculty, 1976 to 1979

1979 CCNY, Distinguished Professor,

1980-1983: CCNY School of Architecture, Dean

1984: University of California, Berkeley, Visiting Distinguished Professor

1985–present: CCNY School of Architecture, Professor

== Awards ==
1966: Recipient Design award for Brown University of Science Library, Department of Health

== Partial Project List ==
- Academy Hill Development (Hudson, NY)
- Pierson School (Tarrytown, NY)
- Schiff House, Montauk, NY
- designed the Shelter Island home at 139 Ram Island Drive

== Bibliography ==
- Piomelli, Rosaria. "Canary Wharf: London in the Third Millenium." Zodiac, Volume 5, March 1991, London.
- Gehl, Jan. Vitta in Citta. 1992. [Translator]

== Papers ==
The M. Rosaria Piomelli Architectural Papers, 1960–1995, are held in Special Collections, Virginia Polytechnic Institute and State University, Blacksburg, Va, under the collection number MS1995-007.

== See also ==
- List of Italian Americans
- Women in architecture
