= Sciences Library (Brown University) =

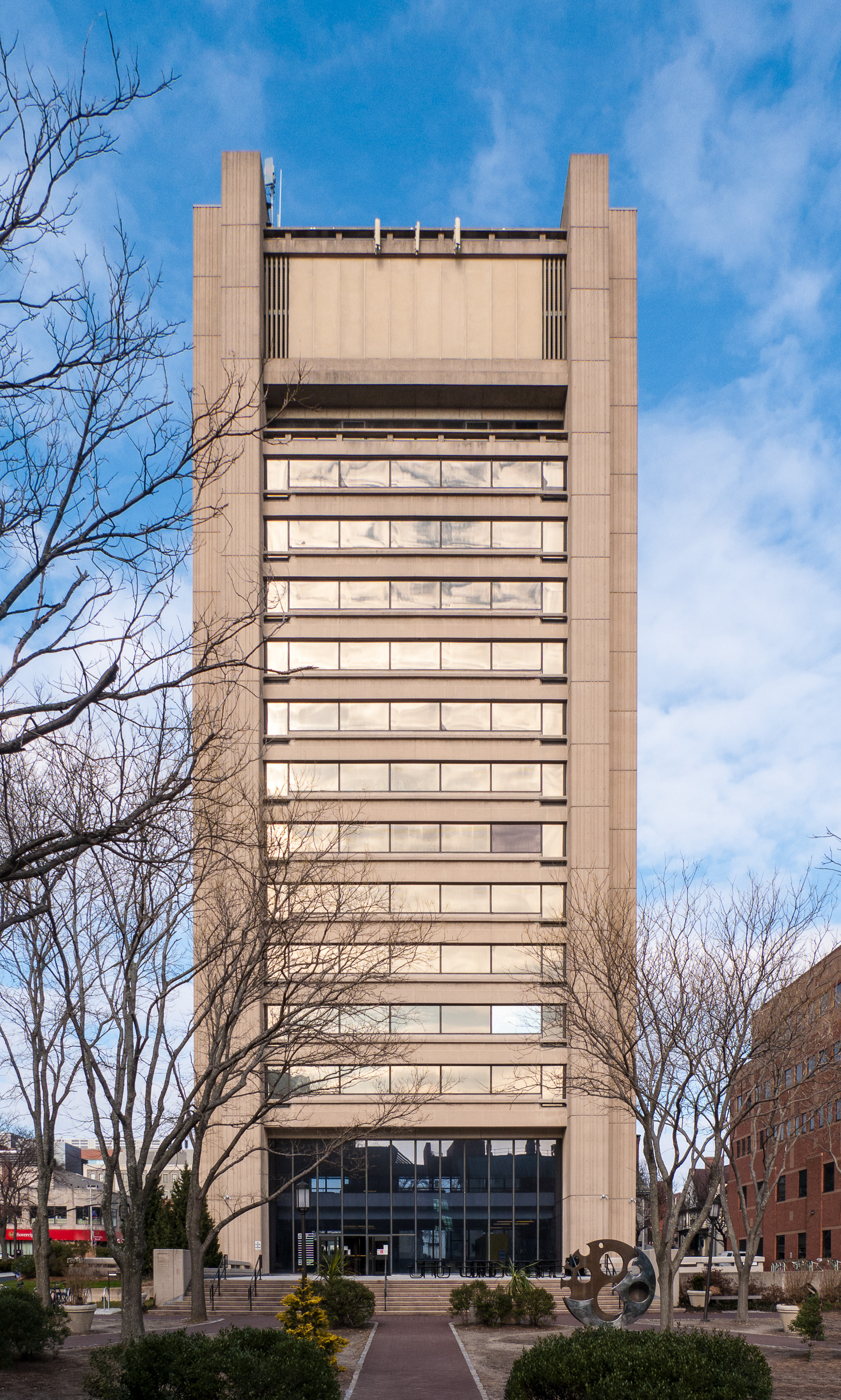
- Interactive map of the Sciences Library area

General information
- Type: Library
- Architectural style: Brutalist
- Location: 201 Thayer Street, Providence, Rhode Island, United States
- Coordinates: 41.8269°N 71.4000°W
- Completed: 1971

Height
- Roof: 180 feet (55 m)

Technical details
- Floor count: 15
- Lifts/elevators: 4

Design and construction
- Architect: Warner, Burns, Toan & Lunde
- Developer: Brown University
- Main contractor: Dimeo Construction Company

The Sciences Library (nicknamed "SciLi", pronounced “sigh-lie”) is a high-rise building at Brown University, located in Providence, Rhode Island, United States. It was built in 1971 in the Brutalist style.

At 180 feet (55 m), it is tied with One Citizens Plaza as the 16th-tallest building in the city. The building houses Brown University's primary on-campus collections that support study and research in the fields of Medicine, Psychology, Neural Science, Environmental Science, Biology, Chemistry, Geology, Physics, Engineering, Computer Science, and Pure and Applied Mathematics. SciLi is also the home of the Science Center, the Writing Center, the Center for Language Studies, the Map Collection, the Interlibrary Loan office, and the Friedman Study Center. SciLi is one of five on-campus libraries which make up the University Library.

== Architecture ==
In the late 1960s, the school was faced with the desire for vigorous expansion but had little real estate available, and the high-rise library was the school's solution. Along with the John D. Rockefeller Jr. Library (completed in 1964), the Graduate Center (completed in 1968), and the List Art Building (1971), it is one of four notable examples of brutalist architecture at Brown. The building was designed by Warner Burns Toan & Lunde architects, primarily by M. Rosaria Piomelli and Danforth Toan. The Sciences Library was built in 1971 during the height of a wave of brutalist architecture in the United States, opening three years after Boston City Hall (1968), one year after Geisel Library (1970), and one year before Carney Library at the University of Massachusetts Dartmouth (1971). Classical High School in Providence was also completed in 1970 in a brutalist style.

Clashing with late 19th century and early 20th century colonial revival houses and abutting street-level shopping on Thayer Street, the Sciences Library is often seen as an imposing and obtrusive addition to College Hill by critics who supported the 2016 demolition of the Fogarty Building, one of Rhode Island's few examples of brutalist architecture. Architectural historian McKenzie Woodward condemns the building as "overwhelm[ing] everything around it", even comparing it to a Soviet-era Panelák when viewed from its "all-too-many distant viewing perspectives". Proponents of brutalism assert that it is the world's most endangered architectural style and, given the loss of dozens of significant brutalist buildings in the US in the twenty-first century, the Sciences Library is a rare surviving example.

A 100-foot radio tower, erected in 1972, was removed from the building in 2005.

== Friedman Study Center ==
In 2006, the first and second floors and the basement of the Sciences Library underwent extensive renovations and were transformed into the Susan P. and Richard A. Friedman Study Center. The center includes a variety of seating, a cafe on the first floor, new computer clusters, and collaborative study rooms. This renovation was designed by Architecture Research Office, and structurally engineered by Leslie E. Robertson Associates.

== Science Center ==
In 2010, the third floor was renovated to create the "Science Center", a facility that supports teaching and learning in the sciences. The Center houses academic mentoring and support programs and serves as the campus clearinghouse for information about research and fellowship opportunities at Brown and around the world.

== See also ==
- List of libraries in Rhode Island
