= Providence Athenaeum =

Public library in Rhode Island, US

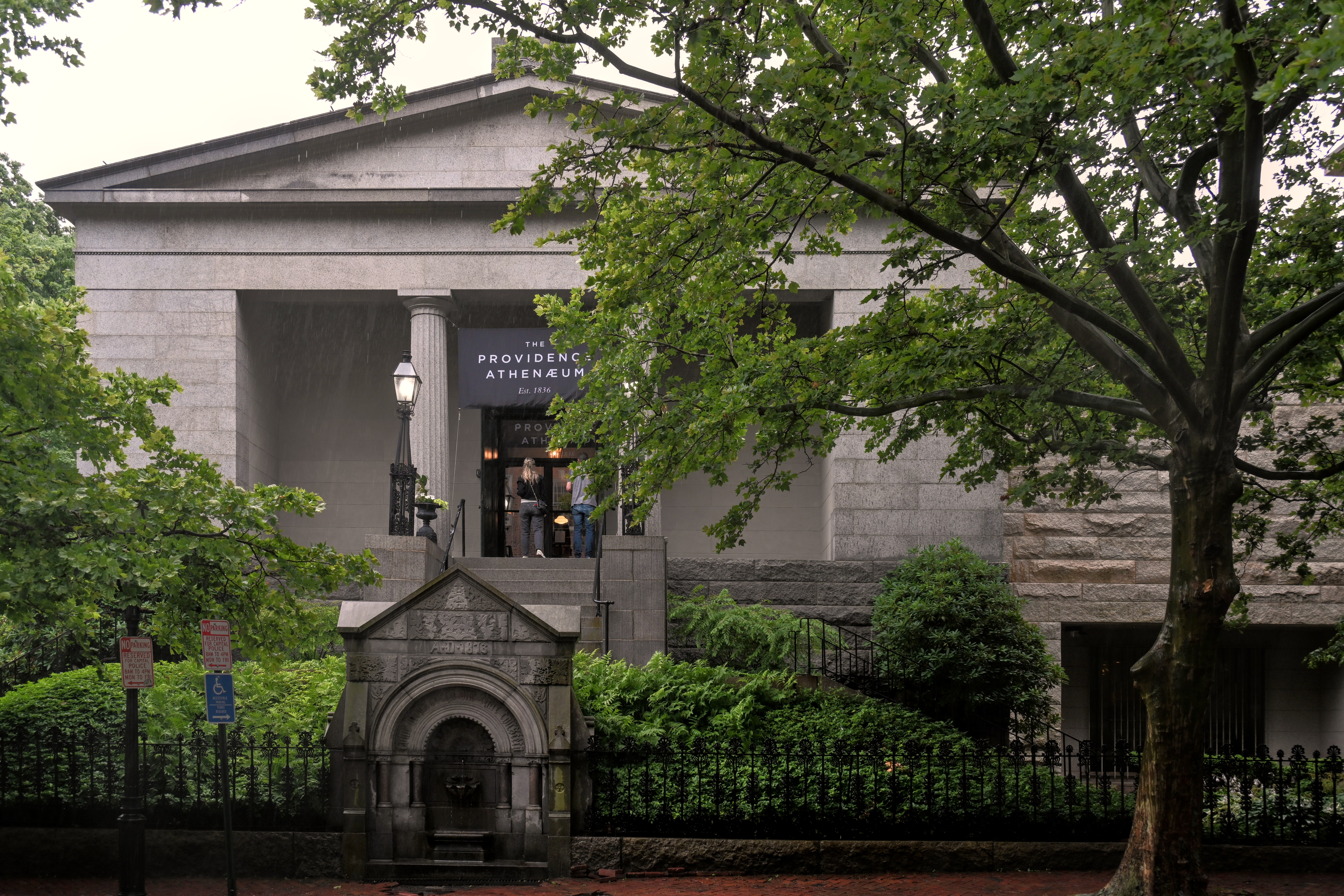
- 41.8256975°N 71.406499°W
- Location: 251 Benefit Street, Providence, Rhode Island, United States
- Type: Subscription library
- Established: 1836; 190 years ago
- Architect: William Strickland

Collection
- Size: 176,849 (2019)

Access and use
- Circulation: 22,662 (2019)
- Members: 1,892 (2019)

Other information
- Director: Matt Burriesci
- Website: providenceathenaeum.org

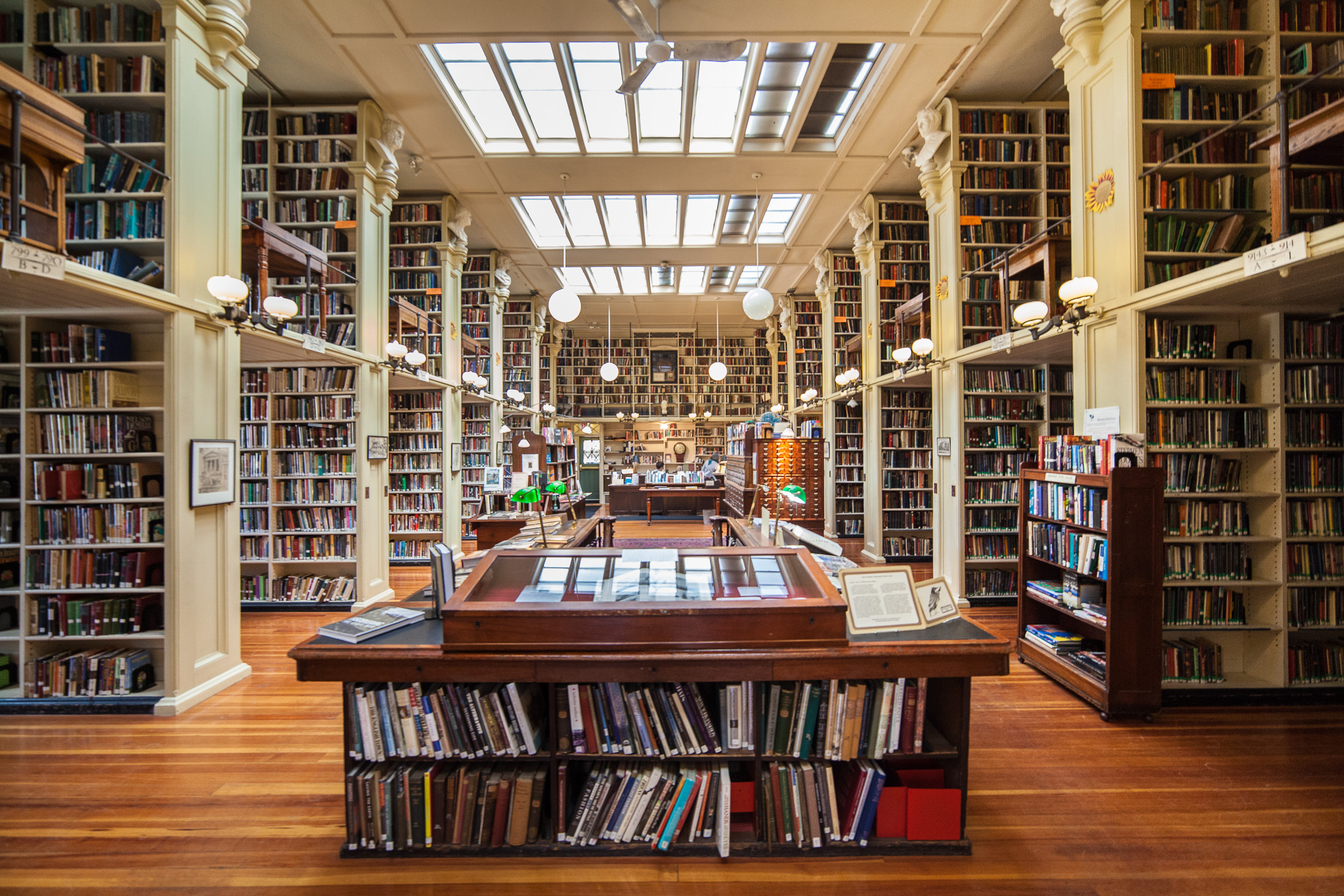
Providence Athenaeum interior in 2012.

The Providence Athenaeum is an independent, member-supported subscription library in the College Hill neighborhood of Providence, Rhode Island. The building is open to the public, but only members can check out items from the collection.

The library was established in 1836 as a merger between two earlier subscription libraries: The Providence Library Company, founded in 1753, and the Providence Athenaeum, founded in 1831. It became "The Providence Athenaeum" by amendment to its charter in 1850.

== History ==
In 1753, a group of private citizens started The Providence Library Company to gain access to a collection of books that they could not afford individually. Members paid a small subscription fee to the library to purchase books which all members could share. Stephen Hopkins, signatory of the Declaration of Independence, was a leading member of the early organization. Many of the early books had to be purchased from England.

In 1758, a fire destroyed the majority of the first collection of books, which were then housed at the Providence court house. 71 of the 345 titles held by the Providence Library Company were in circulation at the time of the fire and survived. The surviving volumes now make up the Founders' Collection. Brown University moved to Providence in 1770, and the library offered students the use of its books. In 1836, the Providence Library Company merged with the Providence Atheneum (founded in 1831), and the merged organization became known as the Providence Athenaeum.

On December 23, 1848, Sarah Helen Whitman broke off her relationship with Edgar Allan Poe in the building.

Author H. P. Lovecraft was not a member of the library, but he lived nearby on College Street; he frequented the library and wrote about it in his letters and stories.

== The building ==
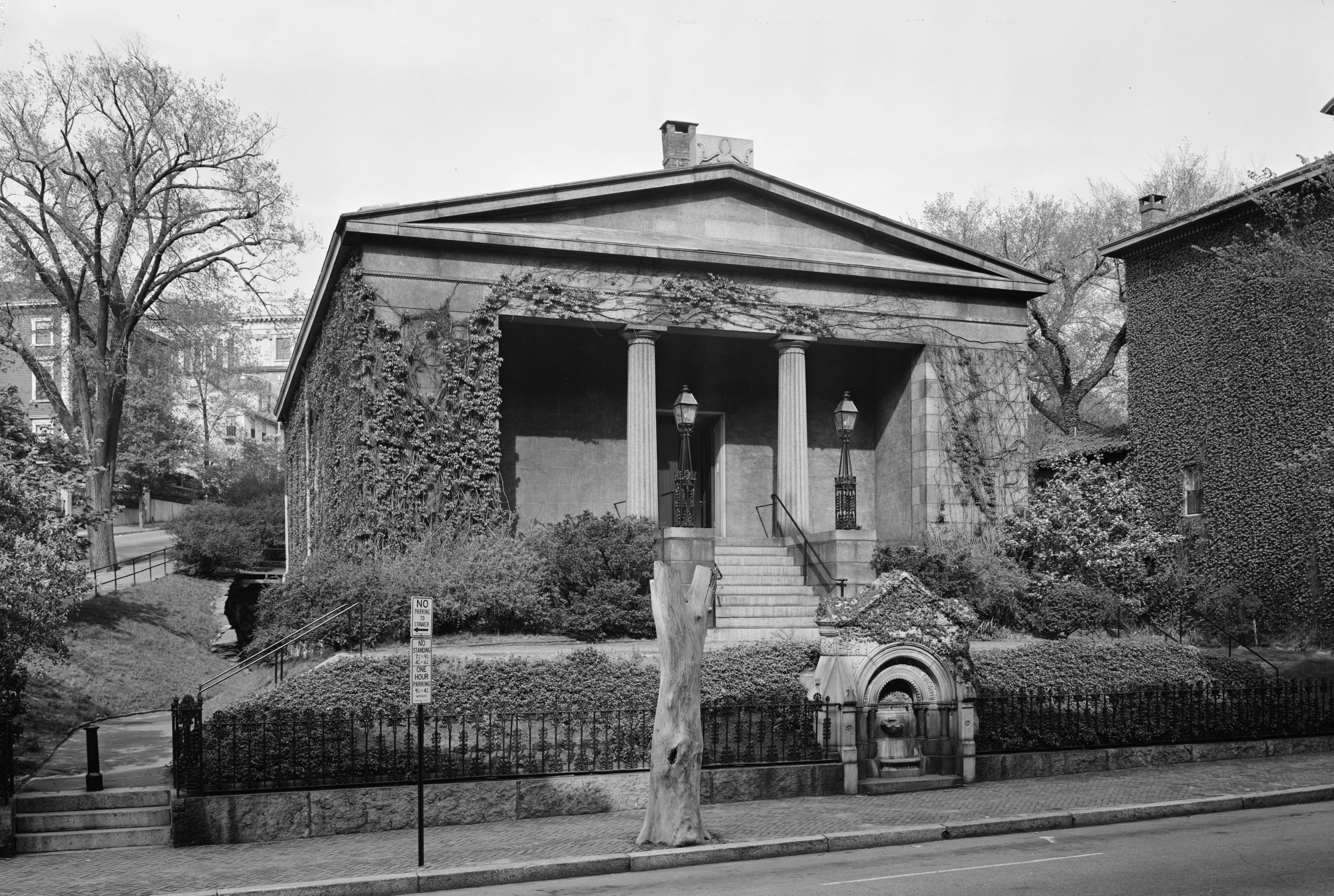
The Providence Athenaeum, circa 1958.

In 1838, the current Greek Revival building was completed on Benefit Street by Philadelphia architect William Strickland.

A three-story addition was completed in 1914, designed by architect Norman Isham. This addition housed the Children's Library until 1979, and now holds the Reference Room. In 1979, a second addition was added by architect Warren Platner to house the Sayles Gorham Children's Library.

== Artwork ==
The building is decorated with artwork including:

- A large 18th-century copy of Gilbert Stuart's famous Lansdowne Portrait of George Washington, painted by an unknown artist
- A small painting titled The Hours by Edward Malbone
- A bronze bust of H. P. Lovecraft
- Marble busts of Athenaeum dignitaries

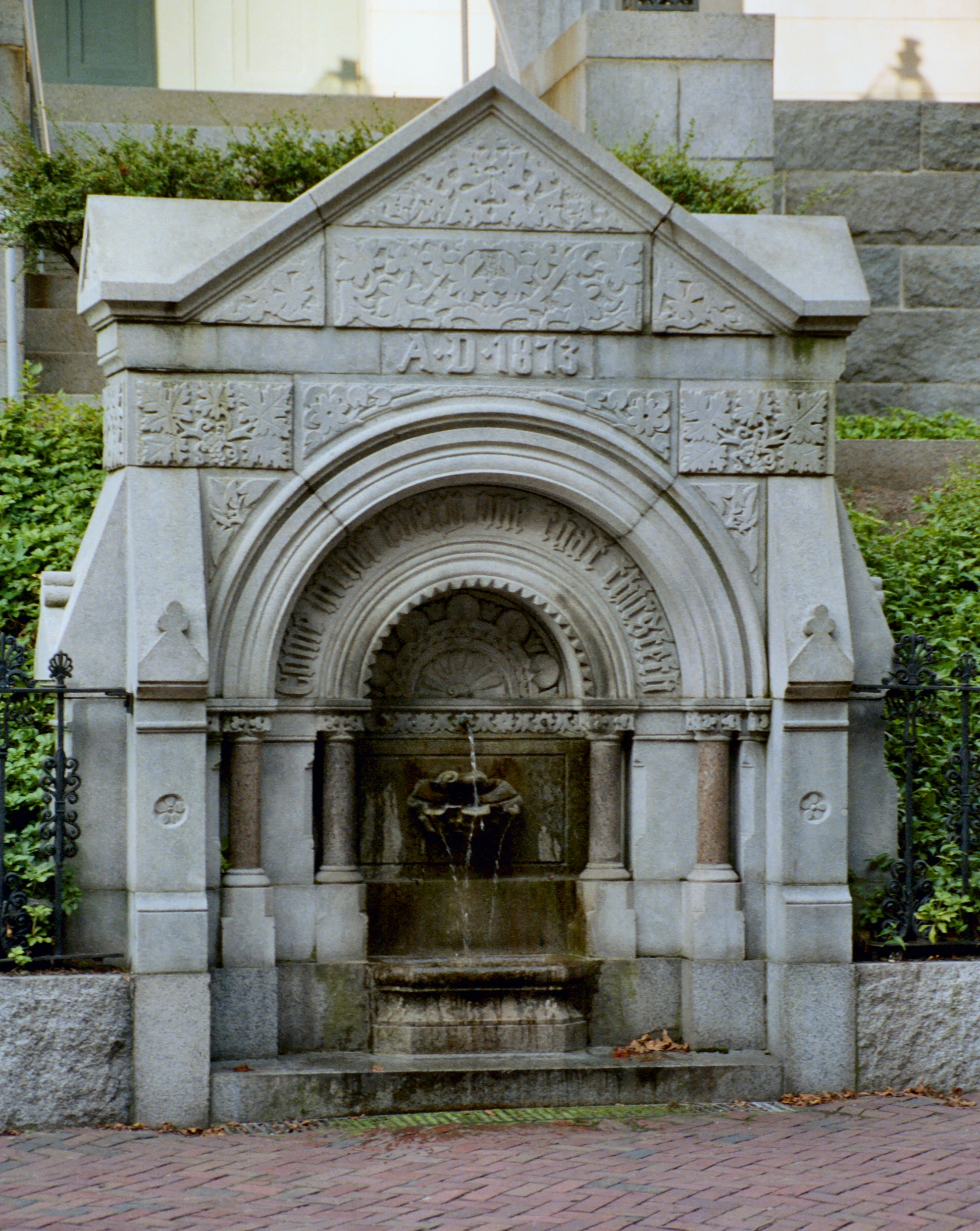
The public drinking water fountain on Benefit Street, with the inscription, "Come hither every one that thirsteth."

In front of the library is the Richmond Fountain, a Gothic Revival water fountain dating to 1873, designed by Ware & Van Brunt. The inscription on the fountain reads "Come hither every one that thirsteth". After falling into disrepair, the fountain was restored to working order in 2018.

== Athenaeum today ==
Today, it continues to operate as an independent, member-supported library. It hosts many cultural events for both adults and children, one of the most famous being its salon speaker series which was launched in 2006.

=== Special Collections ===
In addition to the books available for circulation, the Special Collections of the Philbrick rare book room holds texts dating back to the library's Colonial Era origins:

1. Founder's Collection: 70 of 345 volumes from the Providence Library Company's (1753–1836) original collection survived the fire of Christmas Eve, 1758. The majority of these remain in the collection.
2. Archives: The institutional records of the library, starting with the foundation of the Providence Library Company in 1753.
3. Holder Borden Bowen Collection: Holder Borden Bowen donation of about 2,000 volumes on "folklore, memoirs, 17th and 18th century travel and exploration, and many examples of fine printing and binding"
4. Pamphlet Collection: Focused mainly on the 19th century, it includes "anti-slavery and temperance tracts, Civil War items, materials related to the Indian Rights Association of Philadelphia, and many others topics such as early shipwrecks, funeral orations, feminism, local and state organizations, etc. The collection has yet to be fully catalogued."
5. Smithsonian Institution Publications: Materials from the library's time as a depository for the United States Government Printing Office
6. Old Juveniles: A collection of nearly 3,000 volumes by late 19th and early 20th-century British and American artists.
7. Old Fiction: "This collection includes rare editions of books by famous authors including Walt Whitman, Herman Melville and Louisa May Alcott. There are also many works printed in Providence and Boston in the 19th century and a large collection of women writers from the same period. There are many thousand titles in the collection and most are accessible via the on-line catalogue."
8. Costume Collection: "Comprising about 200 volumes, the costume collection contains primarily 19th and 20th century works on European costume design."
9. Roycroft Collection: "There are approximately 300 items from the press of the Roycrofters that flourished in East Aurora, NY from roughly 1895 to 1915. The Roycroft design was inspired by a mix of commercial interest and the arts-and crafts movement."
10. Travel and Exploration:" The travel and exploration collection contains c.2500 titles ranging from Ptolemy's Cosmographia (1482), to the Description de l'Egypte (1809-1822) commissioned by Napoleon, to early 20th century tour guides. The collection is particularly strong in 18th and 19th century works."
11. Natural History Collection: "There are many important scientific works in the collection ranging from ornithology to horticulture to the physical sciences. A printed catalogue specifically on the natural history collections is available for sale."
12. Robert Burns: "Presented to the Athenaeum in 1920, the Burns collection numbers some 450 volumes. Among the early editions in the collection are the first Edinburgh, the first London and the second American, as well as several early imprints of individual poems and songs. There are also bibliographies and miscellaneous literature relating to Burns."
13. Book Arts: "The library has many books that are notable for their excellence of design. There are examples of the development of books from the middle ages to the modern day. The library owns two medieval manuscripts and eight incunabula (books printed before 1501) that are part of the book arts collection."
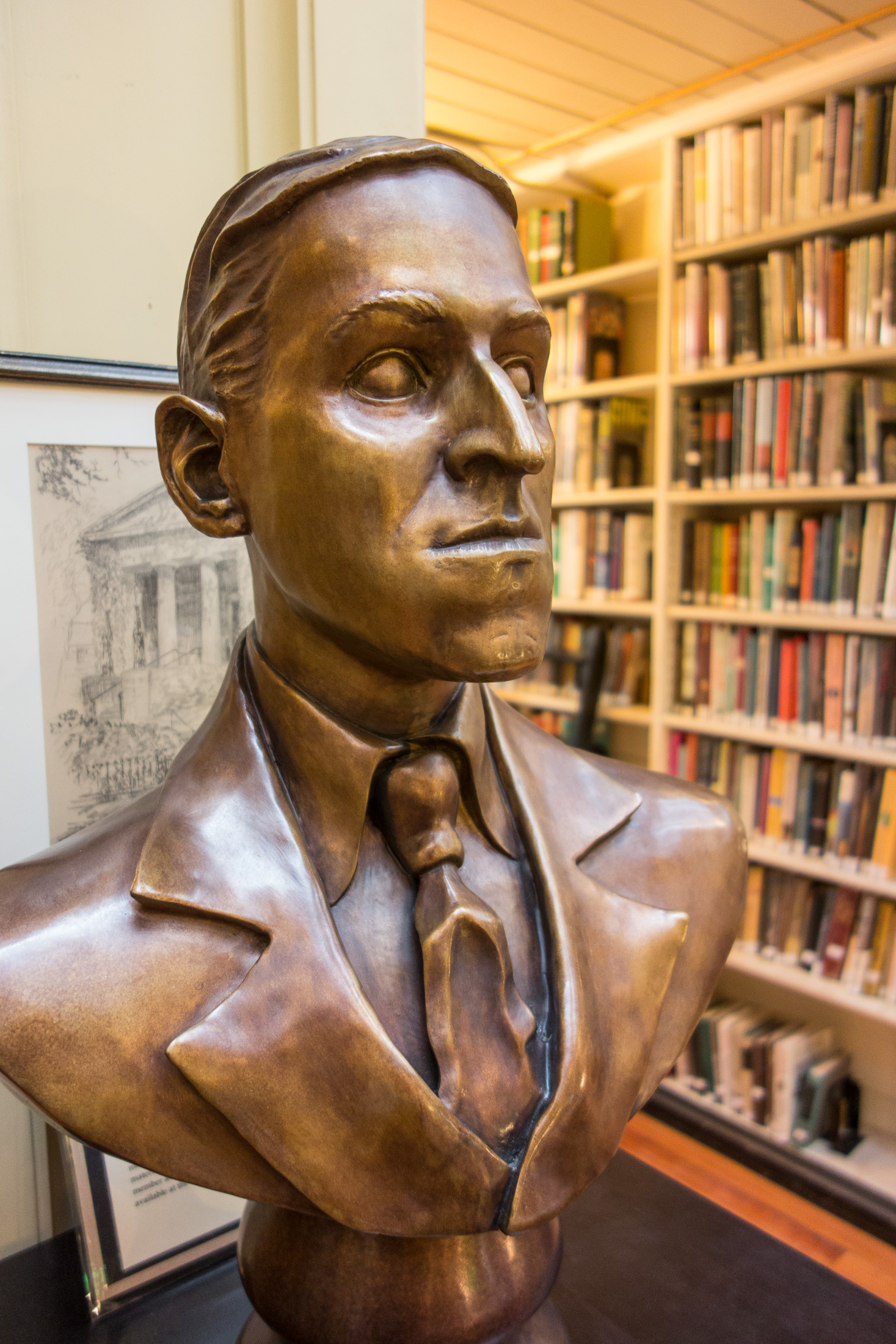
Bust of H. P. Lovecraft, installed 2013

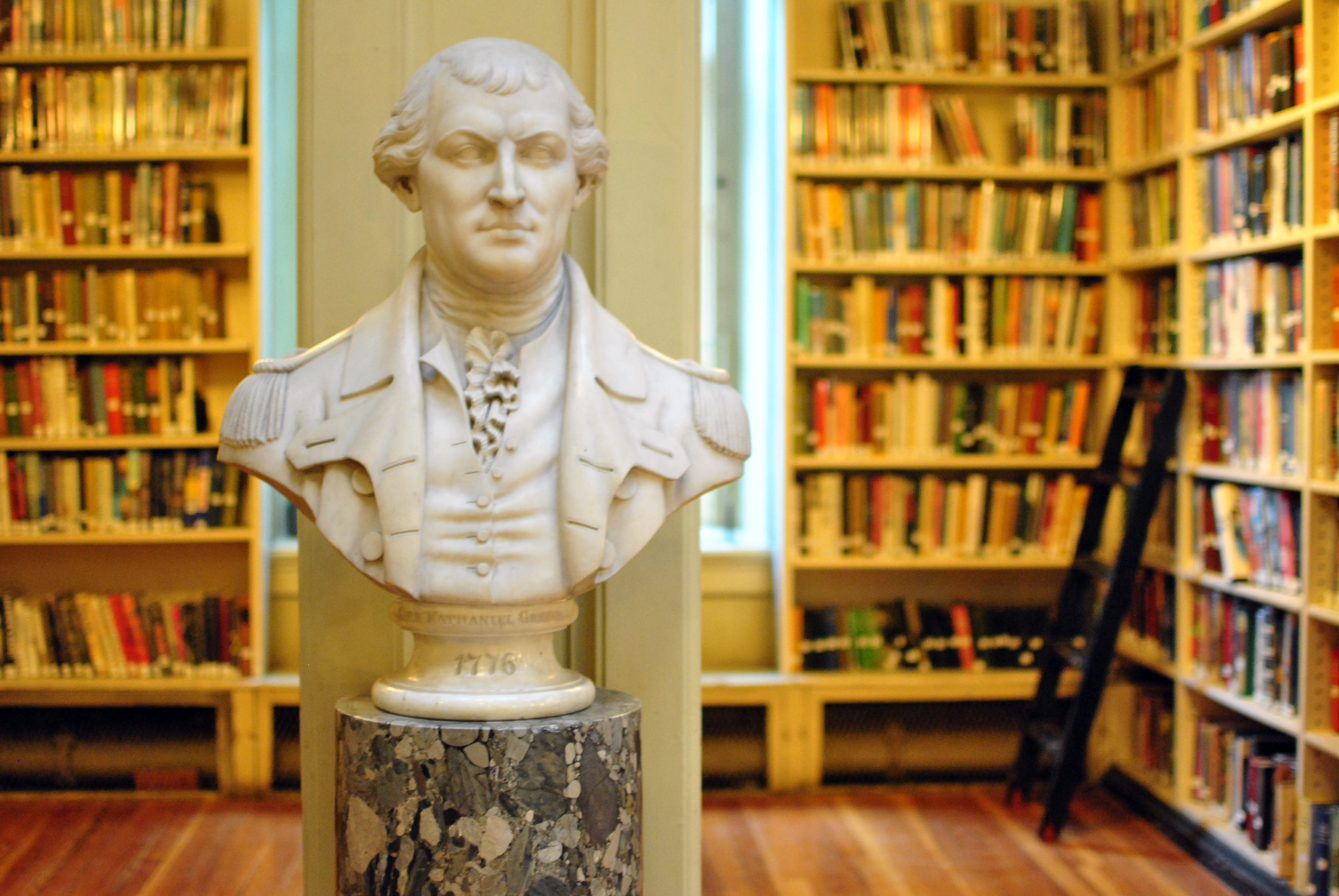
A marble bust of Nathanael Greene

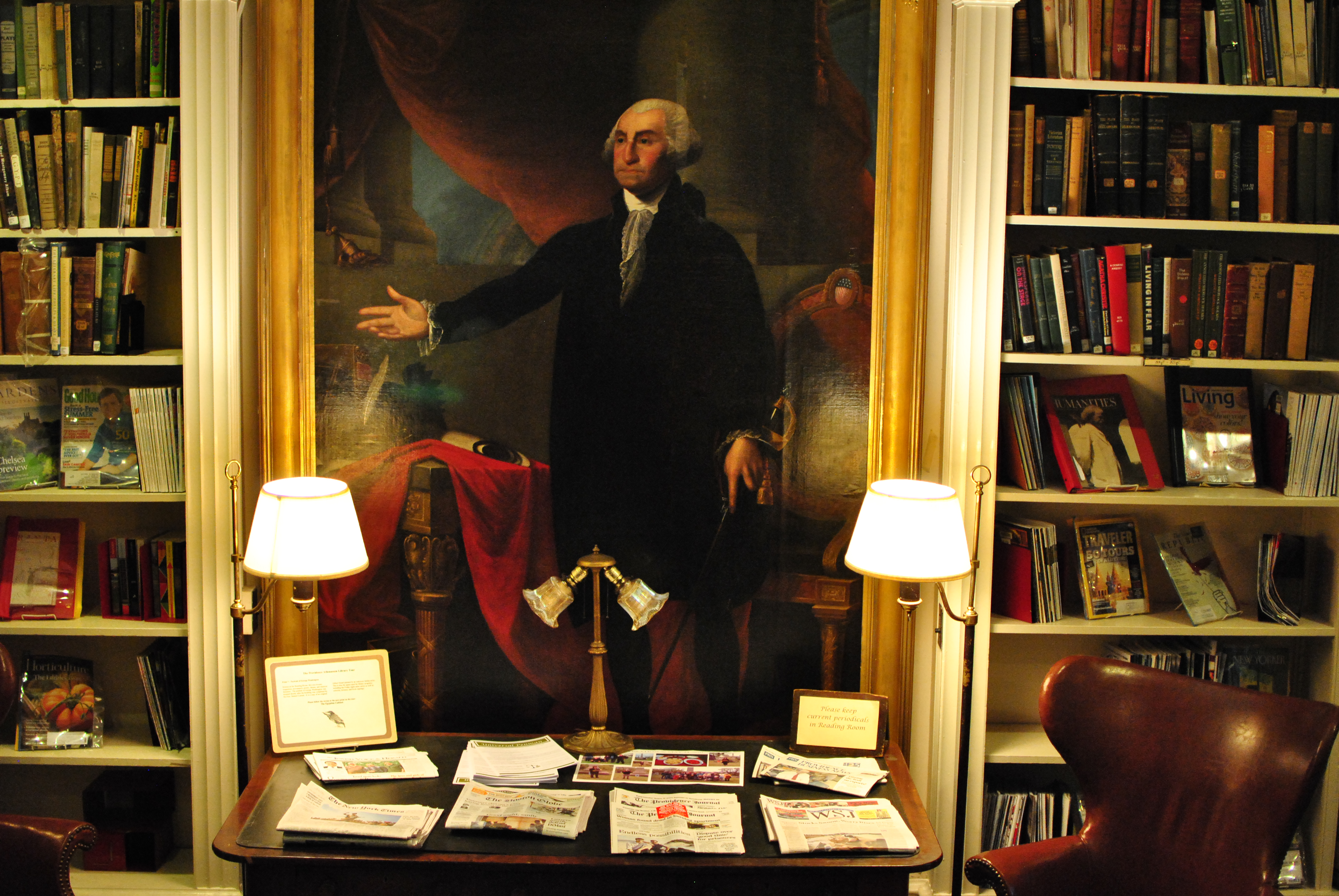
A reproduction Lansdowne portrait of George Washington

== See also ==
- List of libraries in Rhode Island

== Bibliography ==
- Lancaster, Jane. Inquire Within: A Social History of the Providence Athenaeum Since 1753. Providence: Providence Athenaeum, 2003. Available Online
- Edward Field, State of Rhode Island and Providence Plantations at the End of the Century: A History (Mason Pub. Co, 1902) p.640, (accessed on google book search)
- NPR -Athena's Library, the Quirky Pillar of Providence
