= Union Grange Hall =

Historic hall in Rhode Island, United States

- U.S. Historic district – Contributing property
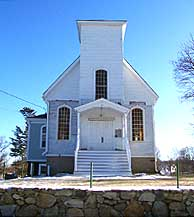
- Location: Slatersville; North Smithfield, Rhode Island
- Built: 1897
- Part of: Slatersville Historic District (ID73000002)

Union Grange Hall is an historic wooden Grange hall located in the village of Slatersville in the town of North Smithfield, Rhode Island. A contributing property in the Slatersville Historic District, it was built in 1897 as St. Luke's Episcopal Mission but it closed in 1900 after the mill closed. After Forrest Mowry and Myron Aldrich purchased the building in 1906, it became known as Lincoln Hall, a community gathering place for social events and dances. Union Grange No. 13 bought the building in 1913 and it became Union Grange Hall. When the Grange closed in 1994, it donated the building to the North Smithfield Heritage Association. Now called Heritage Hall, the building was extensively renovated and its upper and lower halls are once again used for community gatherings.
