= One Citizens Plaza =

High-rise building in Providence, Rhode Island, U.S.

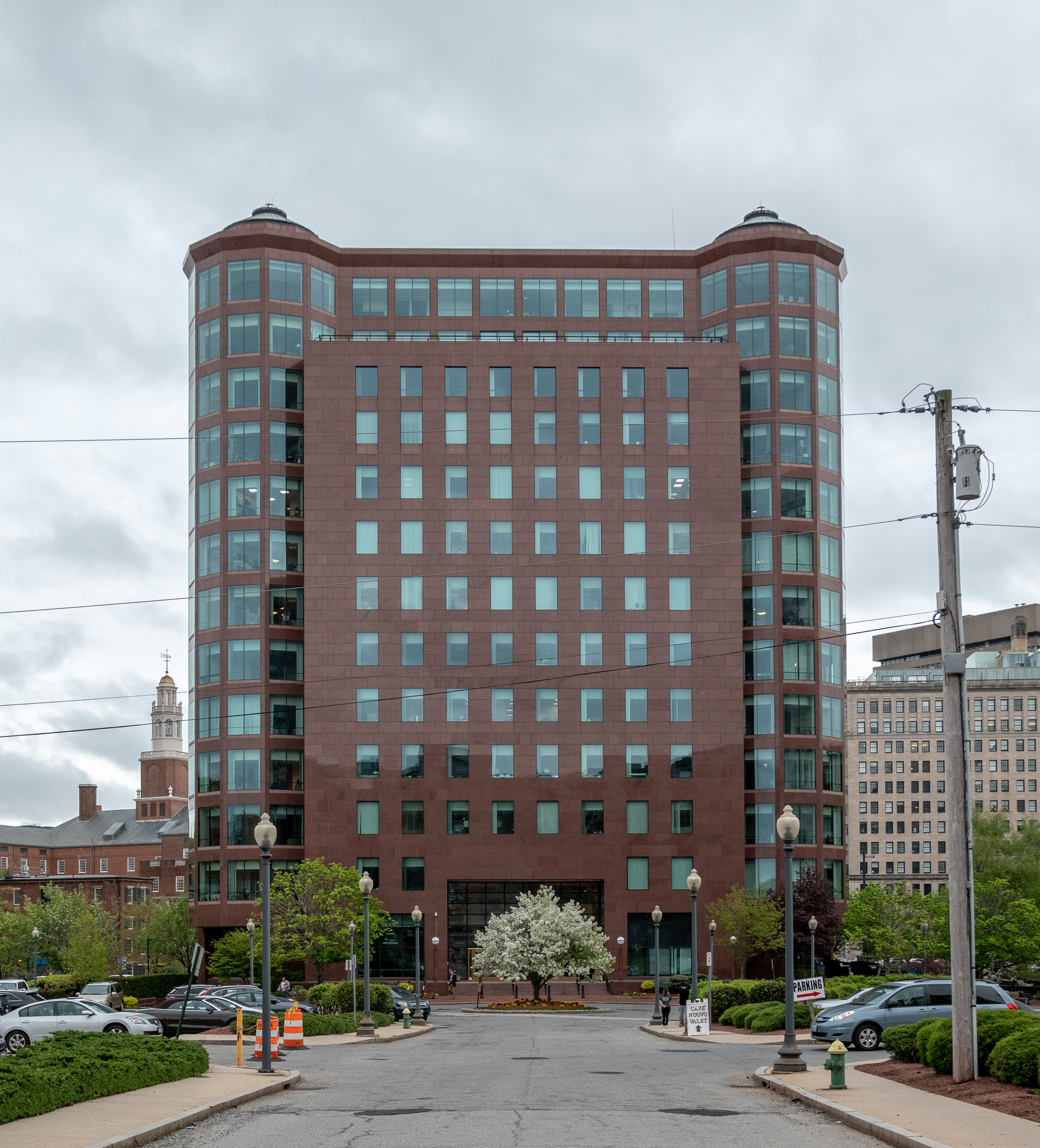

General information
- Type: Office
- Location: 1 Citizens Plaza, Providence, Rhode Island 02903, U.S.
- Coordinates: 41°49′38.78″N 71°24′38.42″W
- Construction started: 1987
- Completed: 1991

Height
- Roof: 180 ft (55 m)

Technical details
- Floor count: 13

Design and construction
- Architects: Jung Brannen Associates; Robinson Green Beretta

One Citizens Plaza is a 13-story office building in Providence, Rhode Island, United States situated at the confluence of the Moshassuck and Woonasquatucket Rivers. It is the headquarters of Citizens Bank. Standing at 180 ft (55 m), One Citizens Plaza is tied with the Brown University Sciences Library as the 13th-tallest building in the city.

Finished in 1991, the building had been the first new high-rise in the city in over a decade. It was designed by Jung Brannen Associates of Boston and Robinson Green Beretta of Providence. Local architectural historian McKenzie Woodward does not agree aesthetically with the building, calling it "squat" and "graceless" due to its "dumpy massing and heavy detailing" in his book Guide to Providence Architecture, though he concedes that the floorplan is effective and that its location makes it very desirable commercial space.

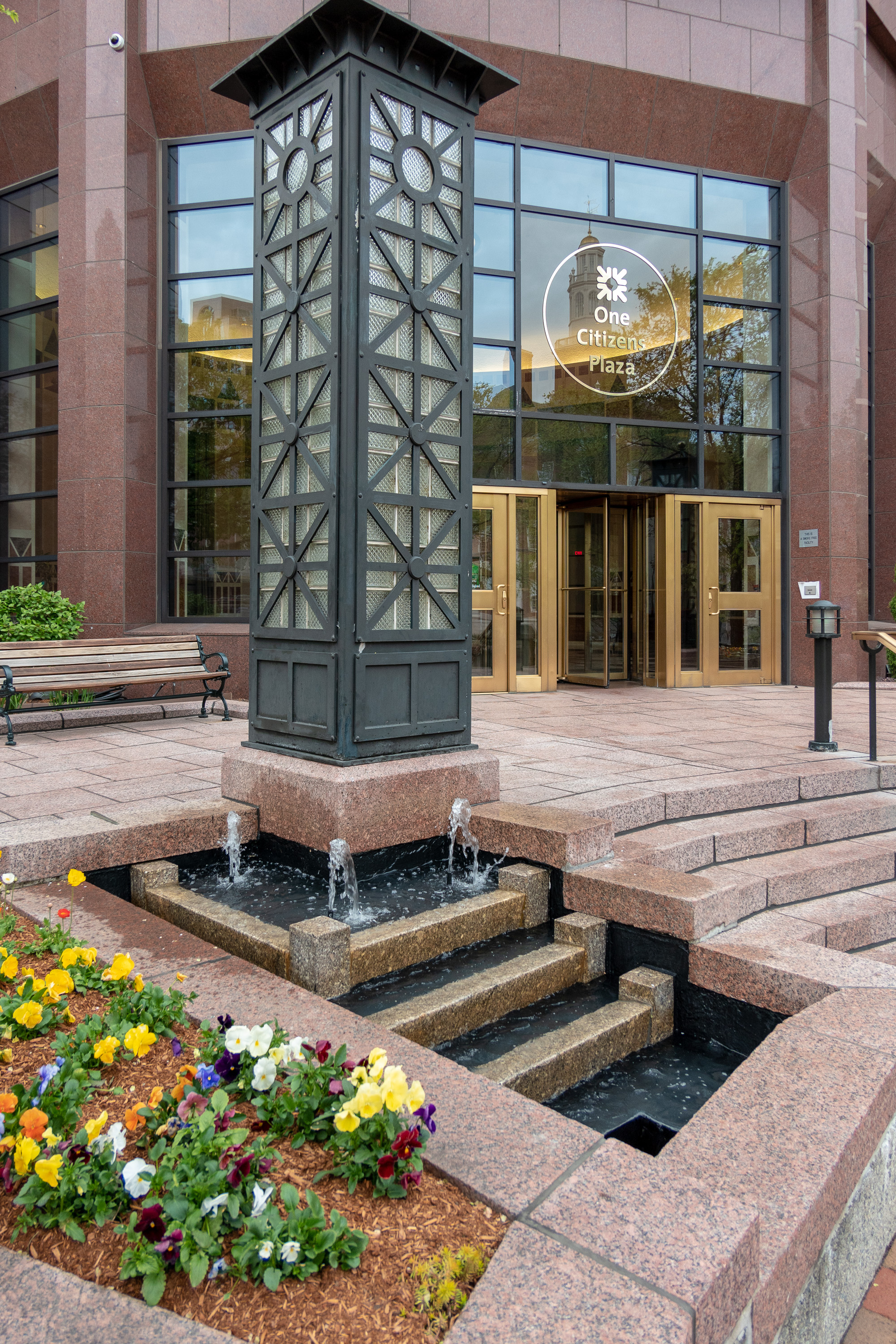
Entrance
