= Danforth Toan =

American Brutalist architect

Danforth Toan (1918–2013) was an architect known for Brutalist architecture who specialized in college libraries across North America. As a founding partner at Warner Burn Toan & Lunde Architects, he contributed to the design of dozens of buildings at university campuses, most notably the Robarts Library at the University of Toronto and the John D. Rockefeller Jr. Library and the Sciences Library (Brown University) at Brown University. He also designed the Olin Library at Cornell, Warren Weaver Hall at NYU, and the Hammer Health Sciences Center at Columbia. He also worked for Grumman Aircraft producing designs for the astronaut living quarters on what would become NASA's first space station, Skylab. "He changed the course of library design in the U.S.," said Rick Bell, executive director of the AIA New York Center for Architecture.

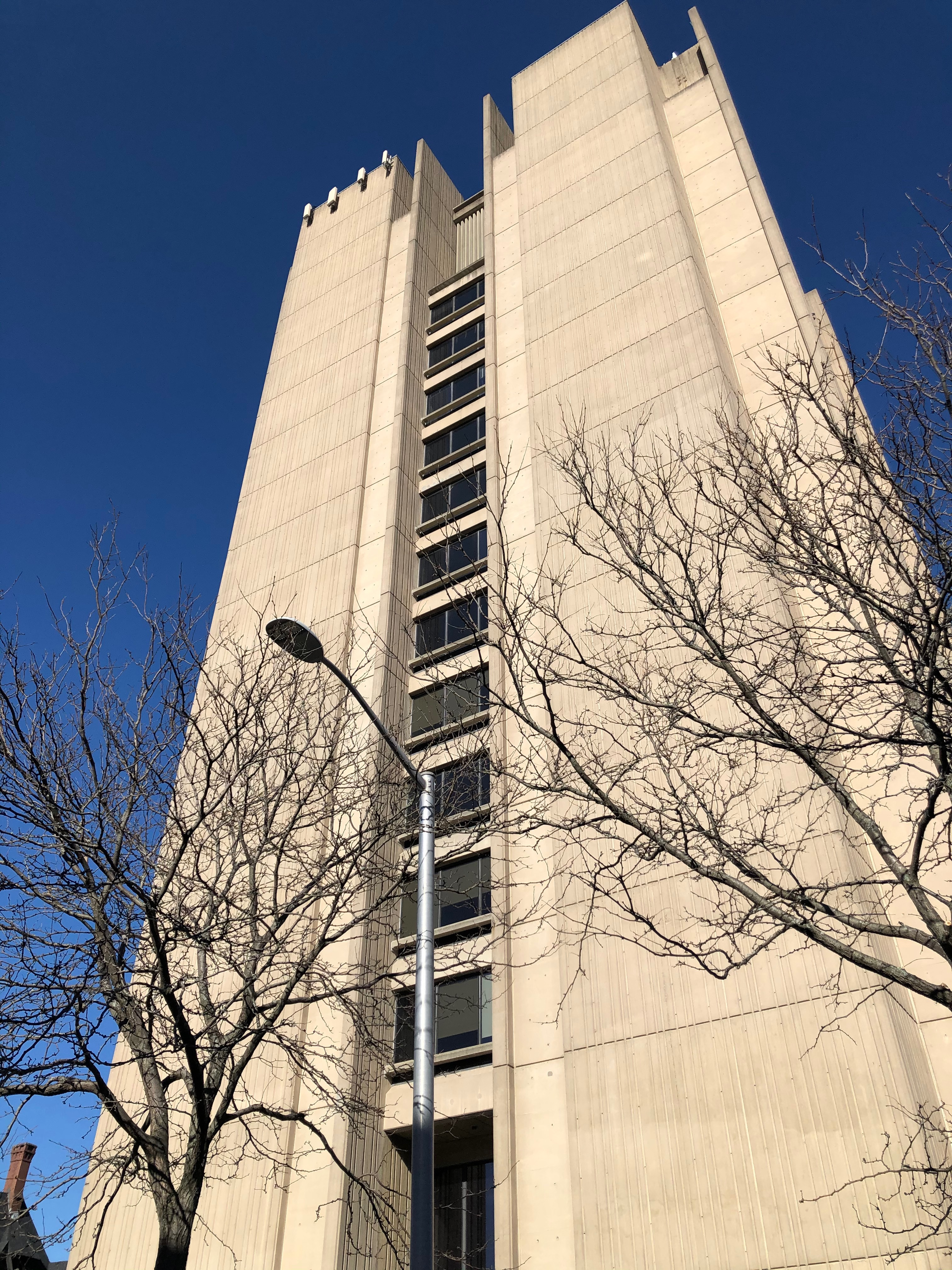
Brown University Sciences Library (1971)
