= Rhode Island Library Association =

American professional association

- Formation: March 9, 1903; 123 years ago
- Founder: Frank G. Bates
- Parent organization: American Library Association
- Website: www.rilibraries.org

The Rhode Island Library Association (RILA) is a professional organization for Rhode Island's librarians and library workers. It is headquartered in Providence, Rhode Island. It was founded on March 9, 1903, at the Providence Public Library in Providence, Rhode Island, at a meeting organized by Frank G. Bates, State Librarian of Rhode Island. The organization's goal was to promote "the Library interest of the state of Rhode Island". The current mission of RILA is "The Rhode Island Library Association is a professional organization that serves its members through career development, education, advocacy, networking partnerships and legislative action."

RILA's first quarterly Bulletin of Rhode Island Library Association was published in May 1908 via the state Board of Education and was discontinued in November 1912. It began publication again in 1927, being published by RILA.

RILA endorsed a Works Progress Administration program for libraries in 1936, resulting in Elizabeth Myer becoming supervisor of a Statewide WPA Library Project in 1940, cataloging public libraries and doing field consultant work.

== See also ==
- List of libraries in Rhode Island
