= North Smithfield Public Library =

Library in Rhode Island, United States

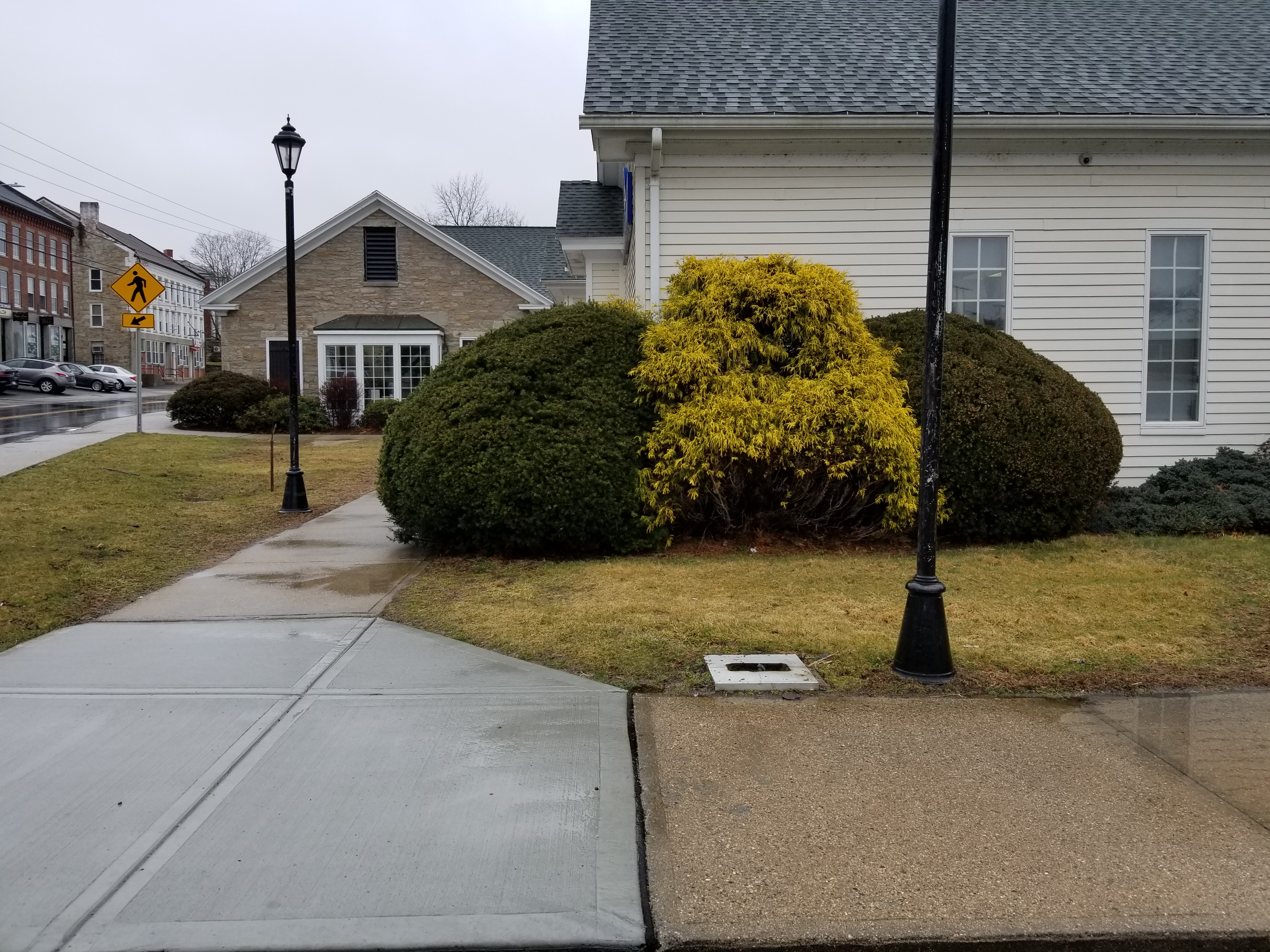
- 41.999757°N 71.580627°W
- Location: North Smithfield, Rhode Island, United States of America
- Type: Public Library
- Established: 1931
- Branches: 1

Collection
- Size: 54,151

Access and use
- Circulation: 53,475
- Population served: 12,000

Other information
- Budget: $435,452
- Website: www.nspl.info/

North Smithfield Public Library is a public library at 20 Main Street in the village of Slatersville in North Smithfield, Rhode Island. Part of the library is currently located in a renovated nineteenth-century stone mill building that was a mill store house for John Slater's nearby mill before it became the North Smithfield Public Library in 1966, and the library is adjacent to the Slatersville Reservoir. An extensive addition was added in the 1980s. The Library was originally founded in 1931 with the first branch in the Union Village school before eventually moving to Slatersville.

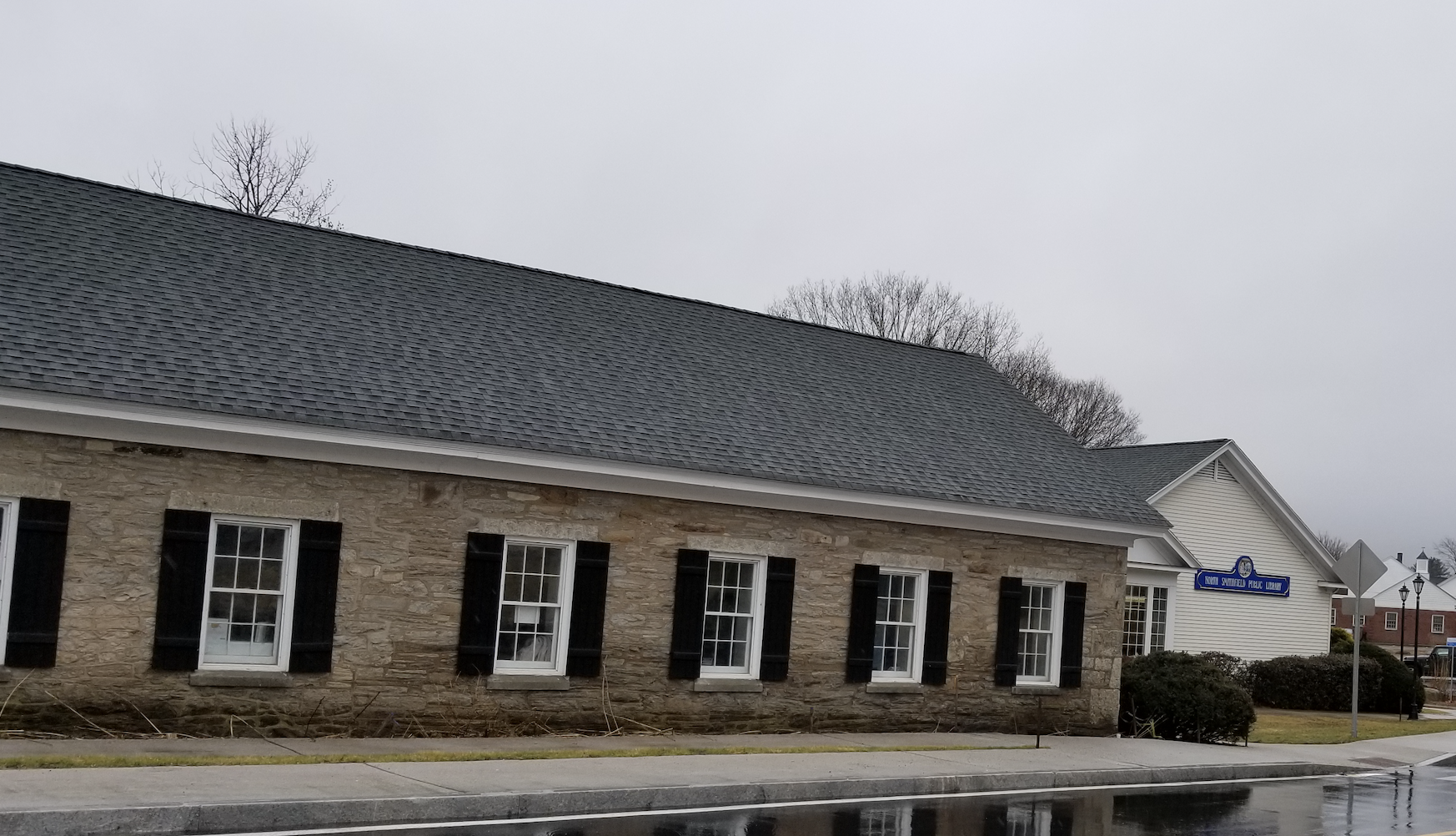
North Smithfield Public Library in Slatersville
