= Slatersville, Rhode Island =

Village in North Smithfield, Rhode Island, US

- Slatersville Historic District
- U.S. National Register of Historic Places
- U.S. Historic district
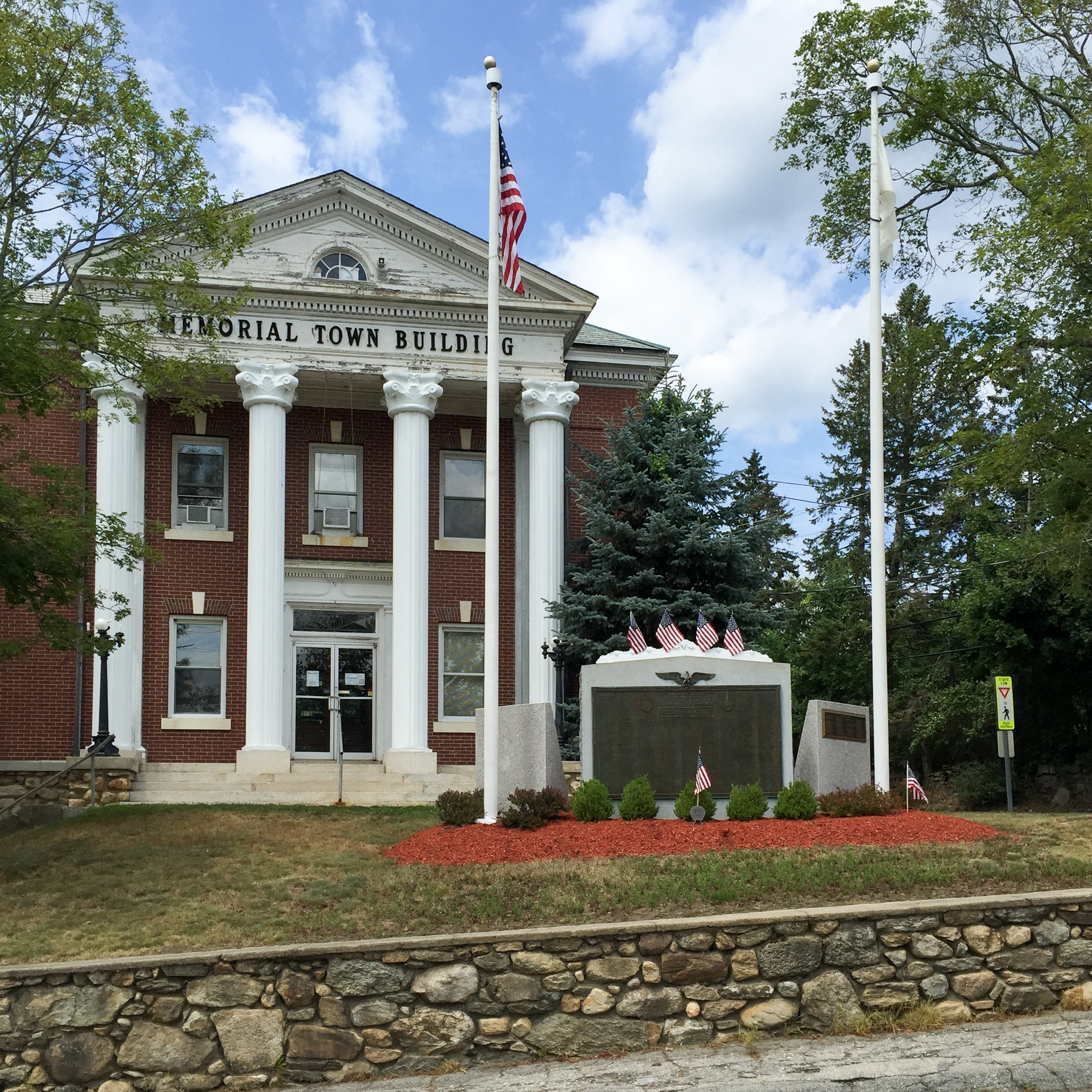
- Town Hall

- Location within Rhode Island Location within the United States
- Location: Main, Green, Church, and School Sts. and Ridge Rd., Slatersville, Rhode Island
- Coordinates: 41°59′53″N 71°34′57″W
- Built: 1805
- Architectural style: Greek Revival
- NRHP reference No.: 73000002
- Added to NRHP: April 24, 1973

Slatersville is a village on the Branch River in the town of North Smithfield, Rhode Island, United States. It includes the Slatersville Historic District, a historic district listed on the National Register of Historic Places. The historic district has been included as part of the Blackstone River Valley National Historical Park. The North Smithfield Public Library is located in Slatersville.

Slatersville was associated with and named for Samuel and John Slater, members of the well-known Slater family.

In the late nineteenth century, the Woonsocket and Pascoag Railroad was built through the village, and the line was later acquired by the Providence and Worcester Railroad and run as a freight rail line terminating in Slatersville near a steel distributor by the Slater Mill, rather than its former endpoint in Pascoag.

== History ==
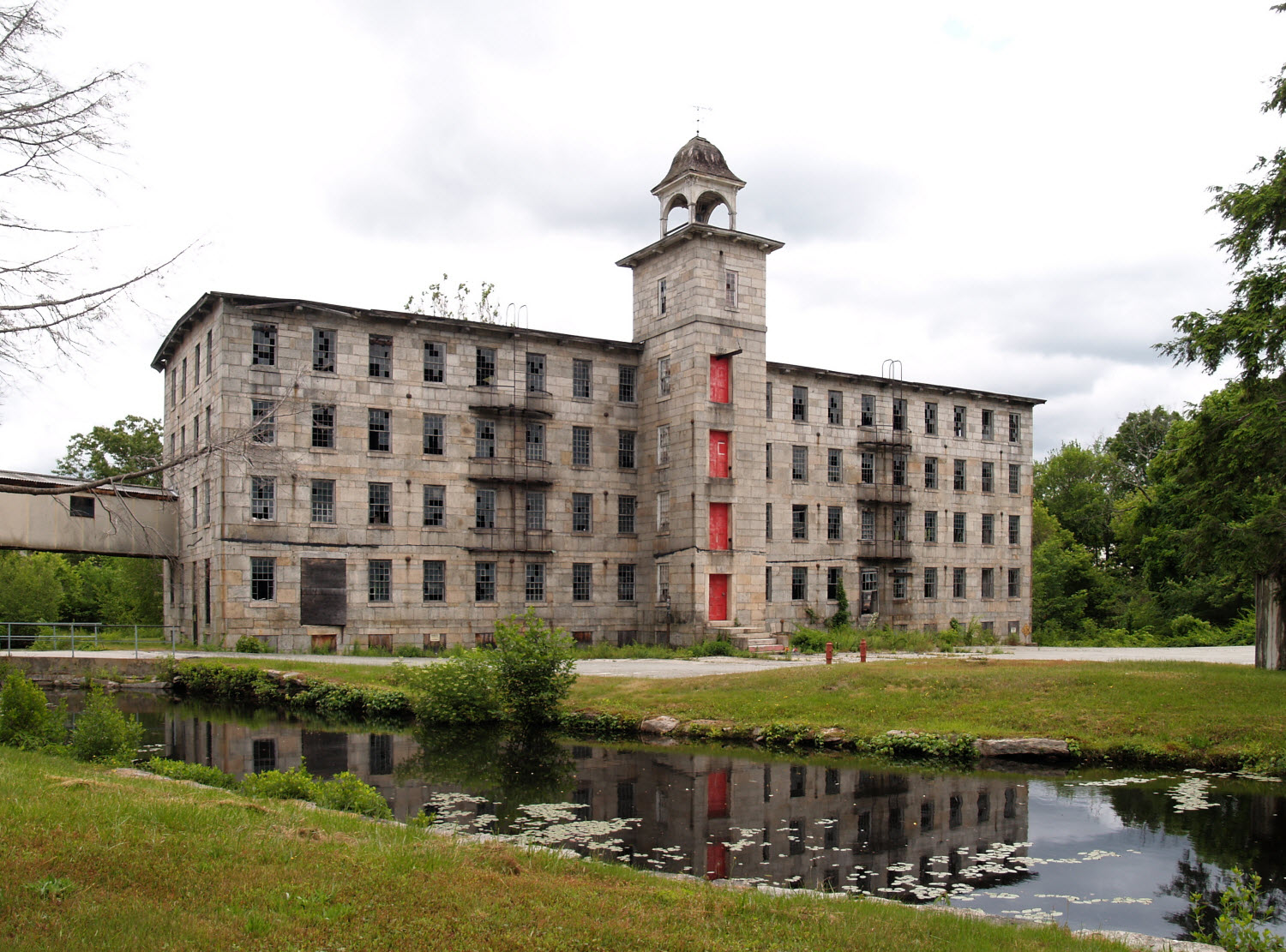
Slatersville Mill, 2005, prior to renovation

The region was originally settled in the 17th century by British colonists as a farming community. The village was founded in 1803 by entrepreneurs Samuel and John Slater, in partnership with the Providence firm of Almy and Brown. The firm purchased the land and began construction of a textile mill. By 1807, the village included the Slatersville Mill, "the largest and most modern industrial building" of its day, two houses for workers, the owner's house, and the company store. The first mill building was destroyed by fire in 1826 and was replaced by the large stone mill which stands on the site today. Behind the 1826 mills stands a stone mill of similar design built in 1843. The mills were powered by water from the large Slatersville reservoir. Slatersville's village green was laid out in 1838 in a traditional New England pattern. Many of the houses around the Green were built by the Slater company in 1810–20. They were substantially renovated earlier in the 20th century to make Slatersville look more like a traditional New England Village. At the head of the Green stands the Slatersville Congregational Church, a steepled Greek revival building, which houses the oldest continuously operated Sunday School in America. The Slater family owned the village until 1900 when it was sold to James R. Hooper, who used the mills to bleach and dye cloth. In 1915, Hooper sold the Slatersville village to Henry P. Kendall. Kendall took a personal interest in the village and initiated many of the improvements which give Slatersville its traditional New England character. Today, Slatersville is owned by private individuals and, in 1973, it became a National Historic District, bounded by Main, Green, Church, and School Sts. and Ridge Rd., with 3,100 acres (13 km^{2}) and 149 buildings.

== Gallery ==
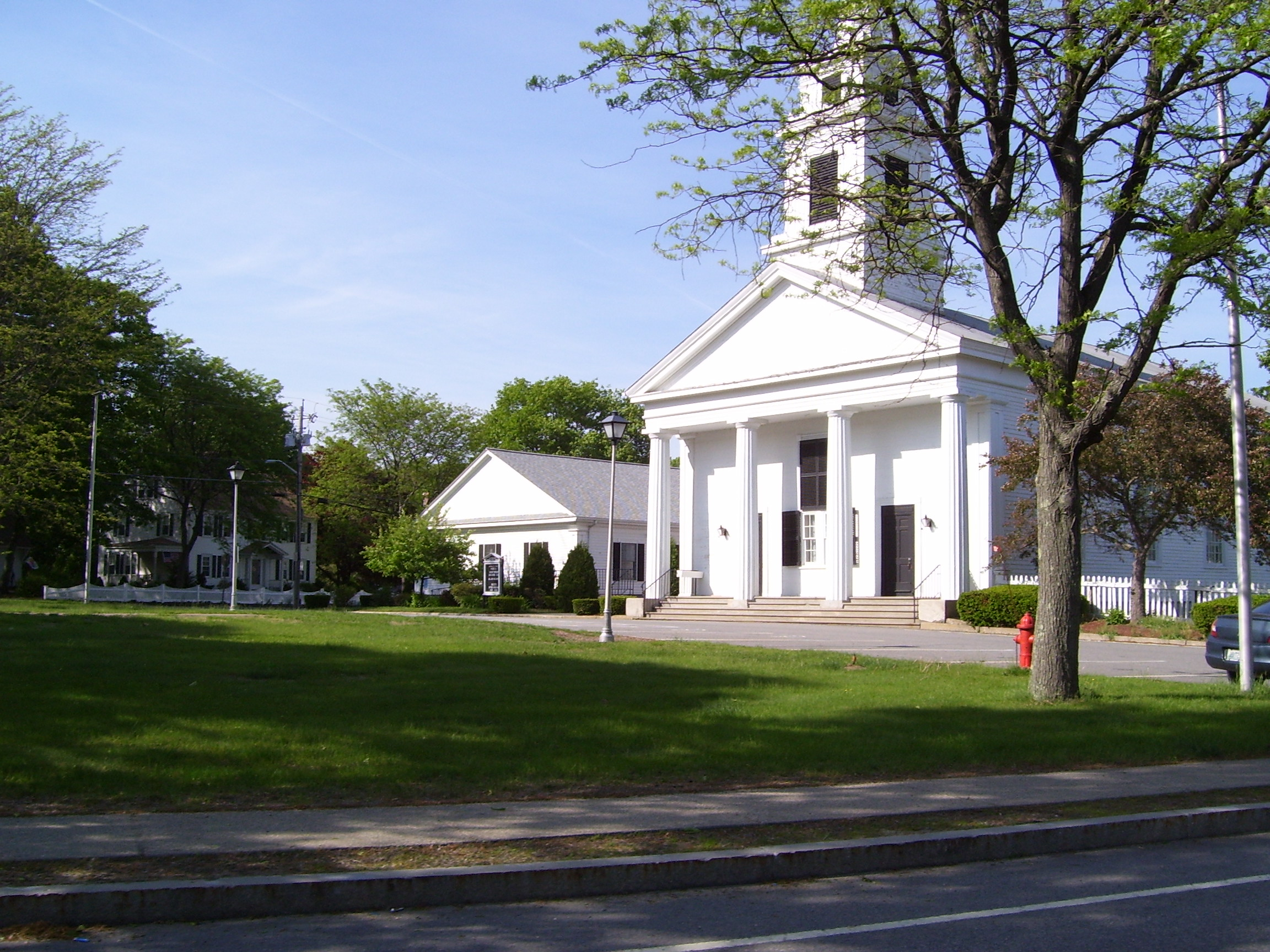
Slatersville Green and the Congregational Church

John Slater and Ruth Slater, co-founders of Slatersville

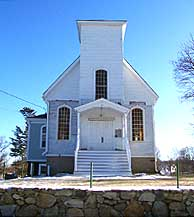
Union Grange Hall, built in 1897 as a chapel for the St. Luke's Episcopal Mission

Stone Arch Bridge, built in 1857, over the Branch River near the Slatersville mills. It replaced a wooden bridge built around 1800.

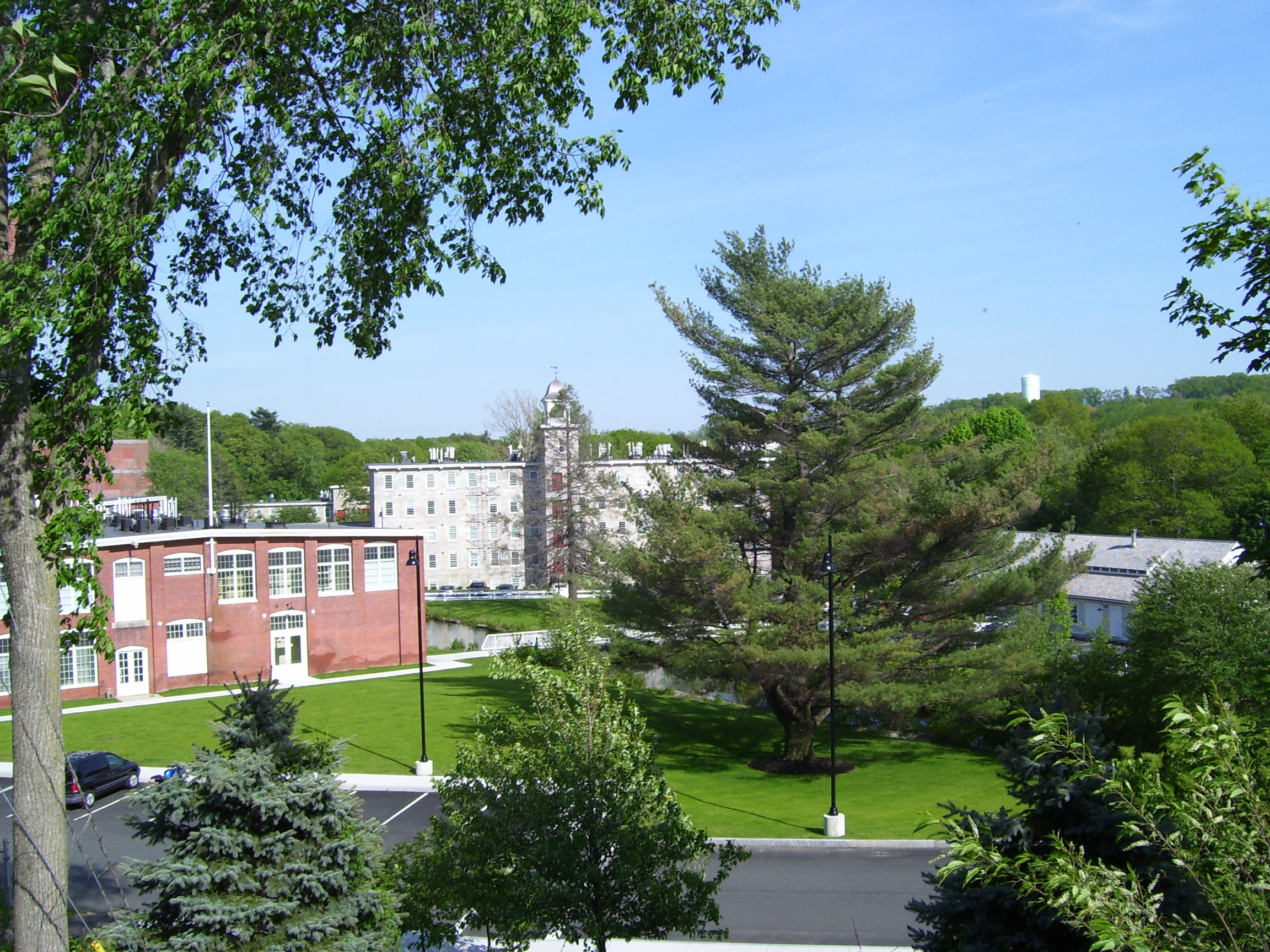
Slatersville Mill, North Smithfield, Rhode Island

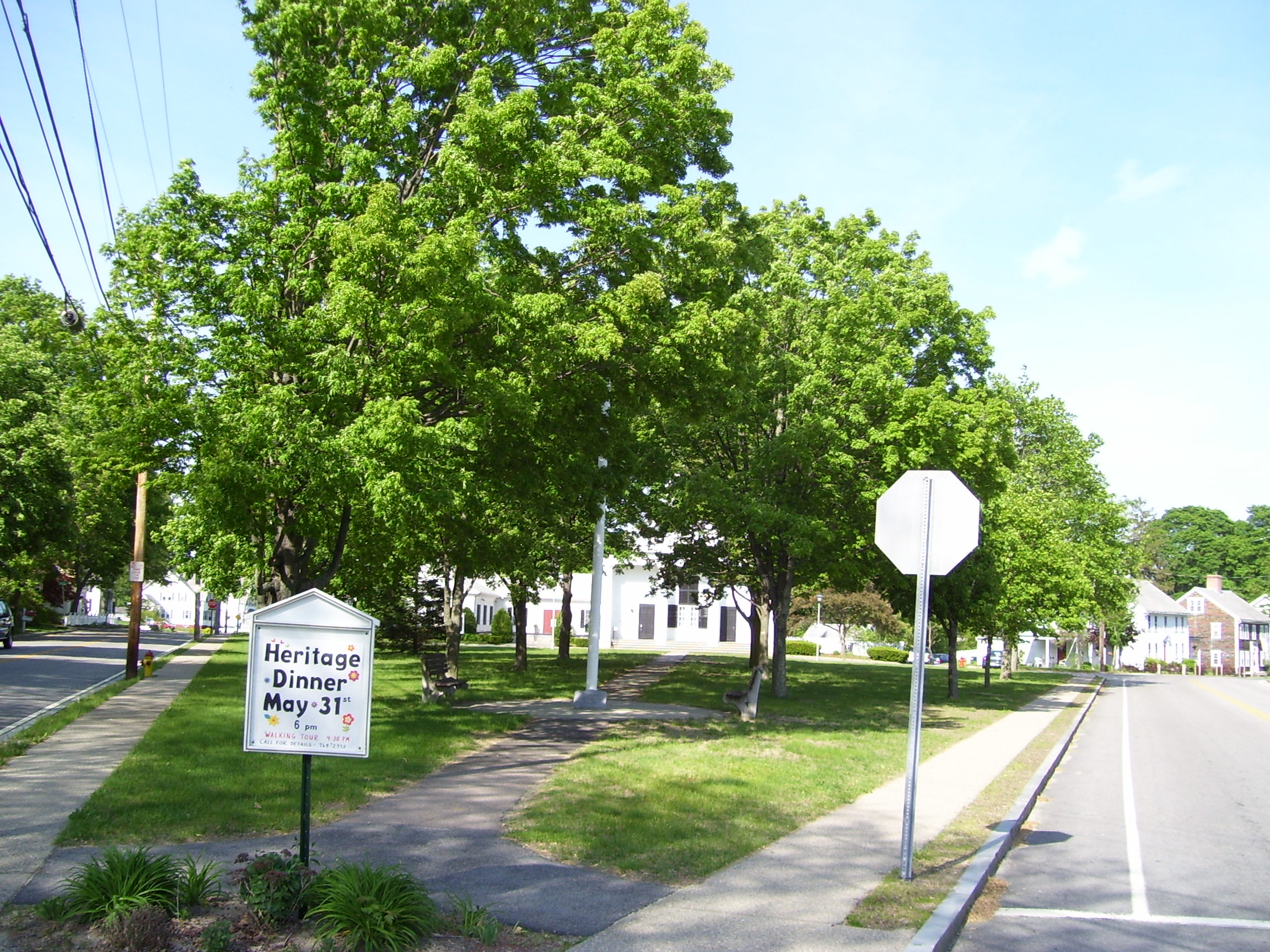
Slatersville Common

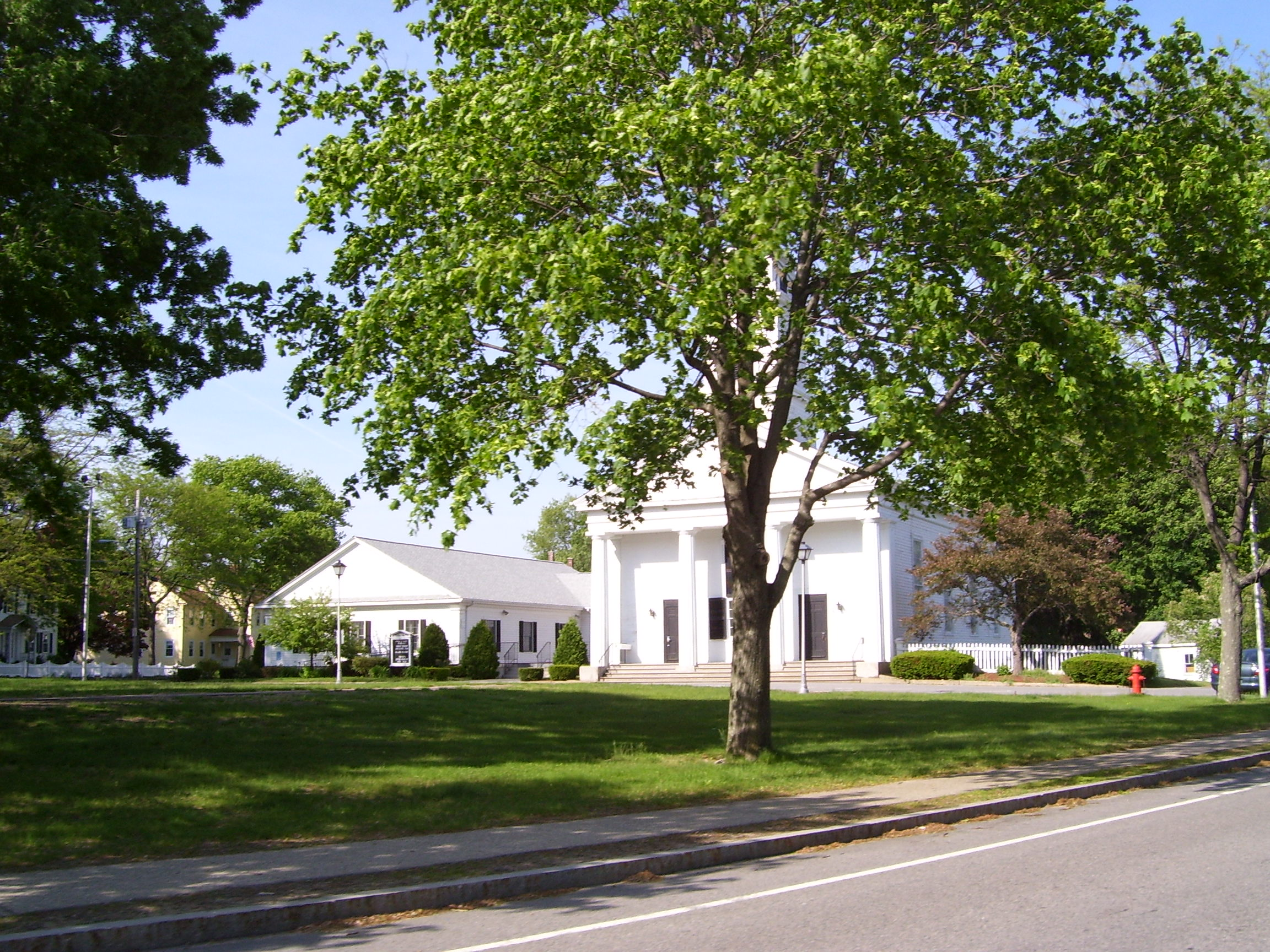
Slatersville Common

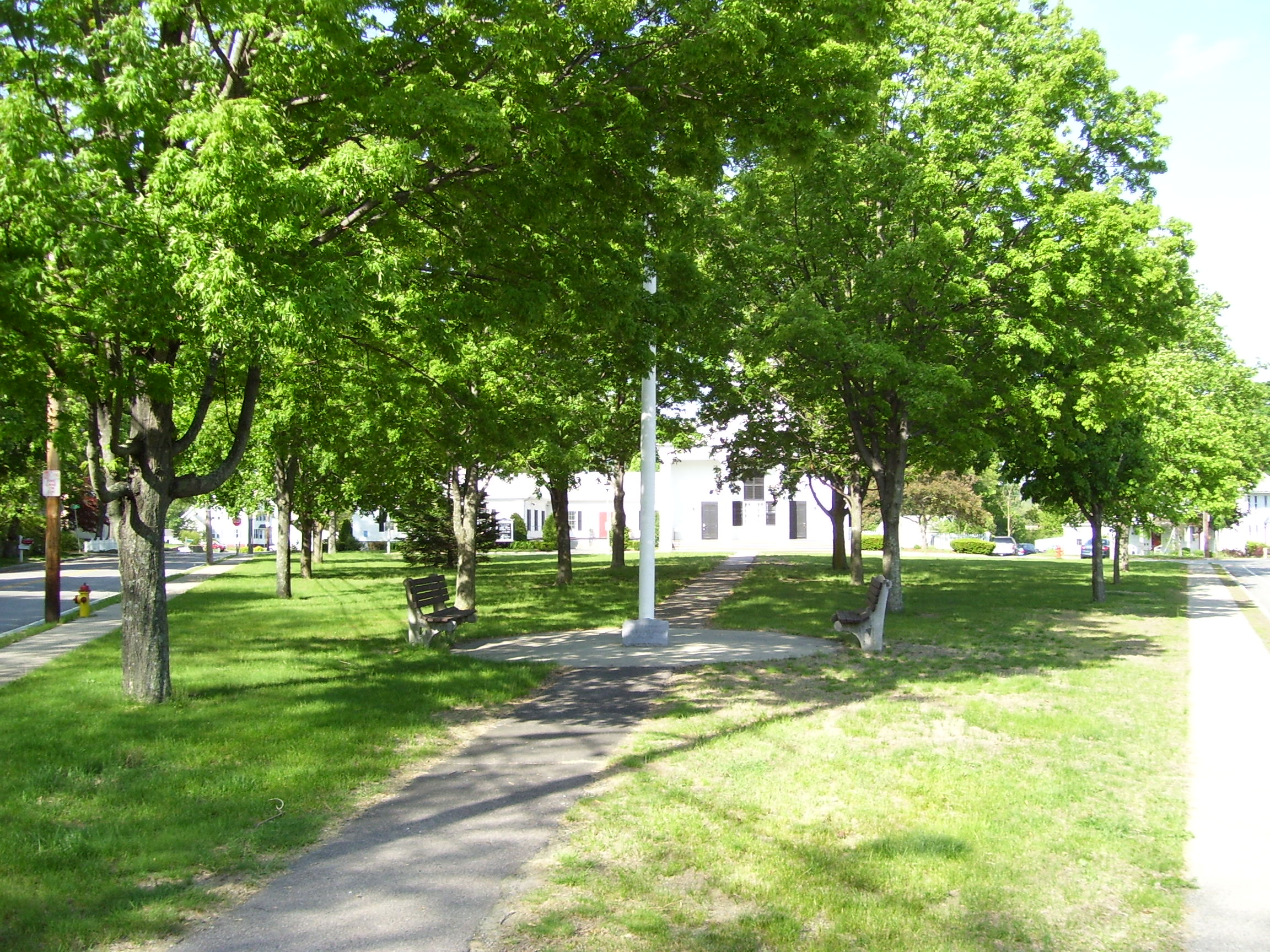
Slatersville Common

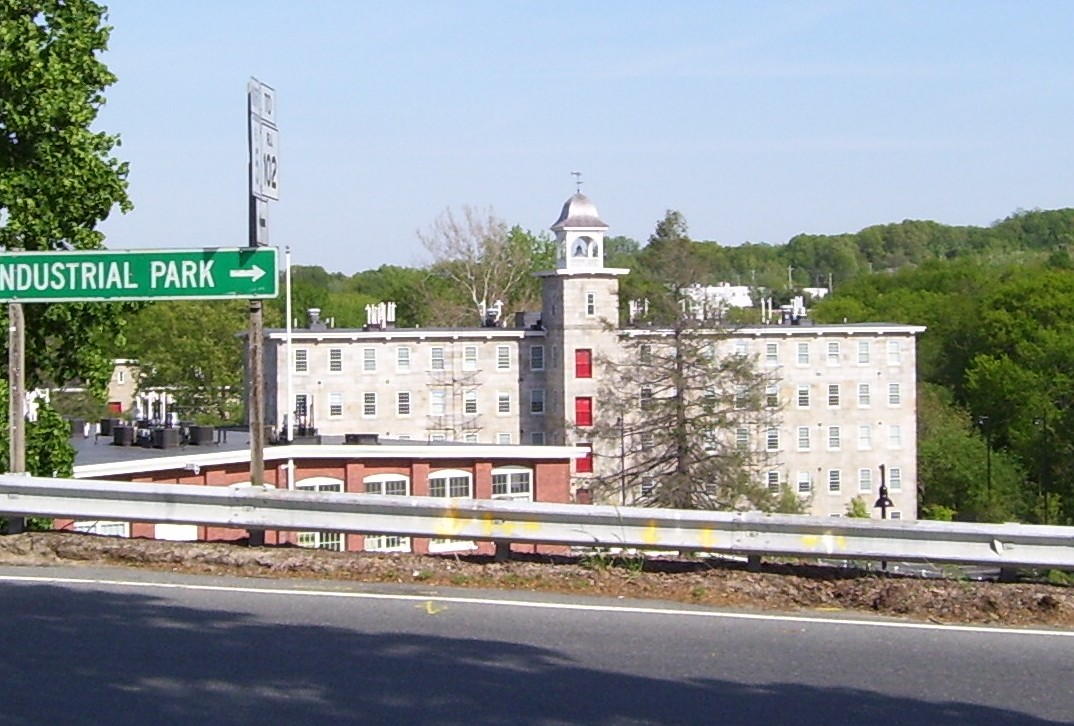
Slatersville Mill

== See also ==
- National Register of Historic Places listings in Providence County, Rhode Island
