= South Providence Library-Providence Community Library =

- South Providence Library-Community Libraries of Providence
- U.S. National Register of Historic Places
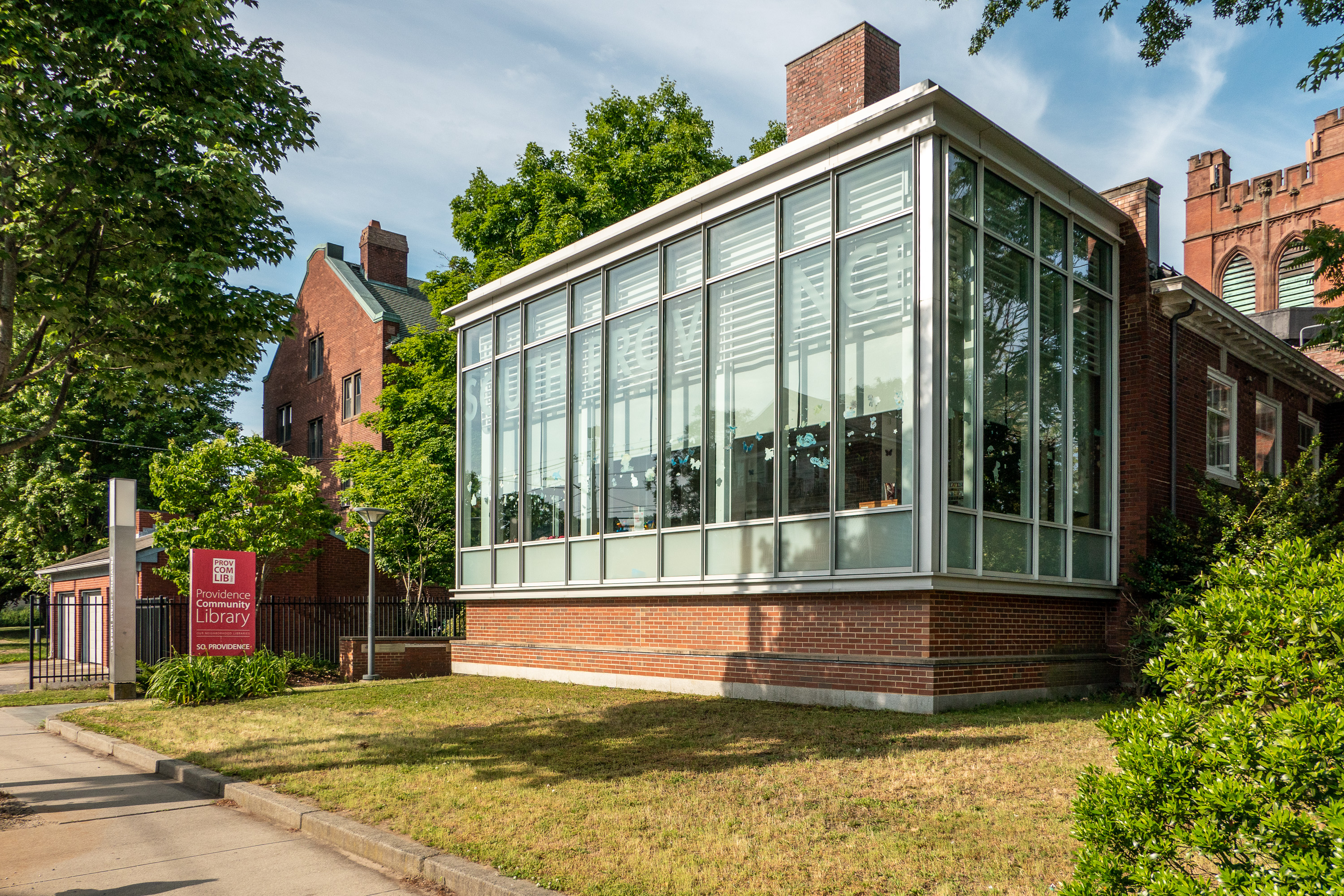

- Location within Rhode Island Location within the United States
- Location: Providence, Rhode Island
- Coordinates: 41°48′7″N 71°24′51″W
- Built: 1930
- Built by: Clifford K. Rathbone
- Architect: Howe & Church
- Architectural style: Colonial Revival
- MPS: Branch Buildings of Providence Public Library MPS
- NRHP reference No.: 98000218
- Added to NRHP: March 5, 1998

South Providence Library—A Community Library of Providence is an historic branch library building at 441 Prairie Avenue in Providence, Rhode Island. The main portion of the building is a single-story brick Colonial Revival structure, designed by Wallis Howe and built in 1930. Due to the constraints of the lot, Howe's otherwise standard design (used for constructing several other Providence branch libraries) was altered to place the building gable-end to the street. The street-facing facade has been obscured by a two-level glass-faced modern addition.

The building was listed on the National Register of Historic Places in 1998.

== See also ==
- List of libraries in Rhode Island
- National Register of Historic Places listings in Providence, Rhode Island
- Rochambeau Library-Community Libraries of Providence
- Wanskuck Library-Community Libraries of Providence
- Smith Hill Library-Community Libraries of Providence
- Fox Point Library-Community Libraries of Providence
- Mount Pleasant Library-Community Libraries of Providence
- Olneyville Library-Community Libraries of Providence
- Washington Park Library-Community Libraries of Providence
- Knight Memorial Library-Community Libraries of Providence
