= Smith Hill Library-Providence Community Library =

- Smith Hill Library-Community Libraries of Providence
- U.S. National Register of Historic Places
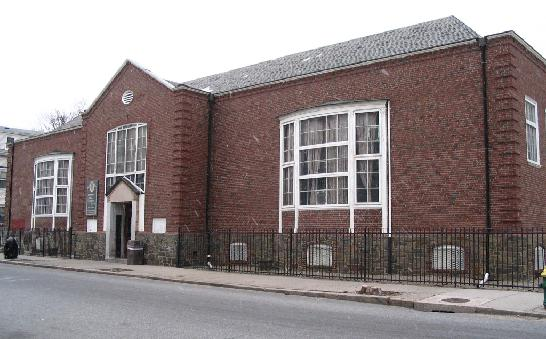

- Location within Rhode Island Location within the United States
- Location: Providence, Rhode Island
- Coordinates: 41°50′7″N 71°25′21″W
- Built: 1932
- Built by: Clifford K. Rathbone
- Architect: Albert Harkness
- Architectural style: Colonial Revival
- MPS: Branch Buildings of Providence Public Library MPS
- NRHP reference No.: 98000216
- Added to NRHP: March 5, 1998

The Smith Hill Library-A Community Library of Providence is one of the branch libraries of the Providence, Rhode Island, public library system. It is located at 31 Candace Street, in a single-story brick building designed by Albert Harkness and built in 1932 by contractor Clifford K. Rathbone. Stylistically the building is a mixture of Colonial Revival and Moderne features. The Smith Hill branch began as a delivery station in 1907, and had grown to occupy leased space, with an annual circulation of more than 70,000, by 1929. Circulation rose rapidly after the building's completion, reaching 119,000 in just three years. The building continues to act as a significant local community resource.

The library was added to the National Register of Historic Places in 1998.

== See also ==
- List of libraries in Rhode Island
- National Register of Historic Places listings in Providence, Rhode Island
- Rochambeau Library-Community Libraries of Providence
- Wanskuck Library-Community Libraries of Providence
- South Providence Library-Community Libraries of Providence
- Fox Point Library-Community Libraries of Providence
- Mount Pleasant Library-Community Libraries of Providence
- Olneyville Library-Community Libraries of Providence
- Washington Park Library-Community Libraries of Providence
- Knight Memorial Library-Community Libraries of Providence
