= John D. Rockefeller Jr. Library =

Main library at Brown University

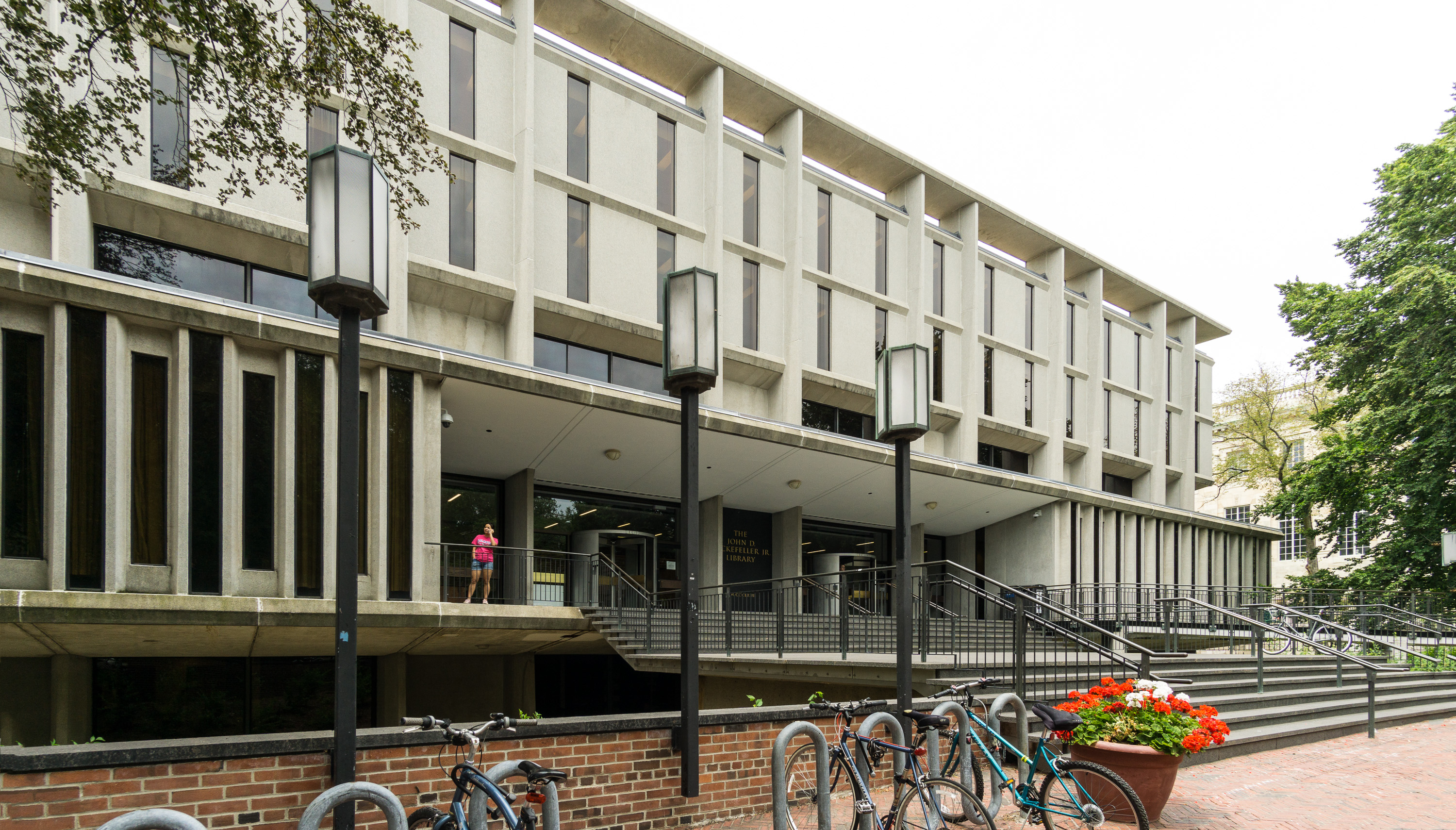
- Interactive map of the John D. Rockefeller Jr. Library area

General information
- Type: Library
- Architectural style: Brutalist
- Location: 10 Prospect Street, Providence, Rhode Island, United States
- Coordinates: 41°49′32.61″N 71°24′18.32″W
- Completed: 1964

Design and construction
- Architect: Warner, Burns, Toan & Lunde
- Developer: Brown University
- Main contractor: E. Turgeon Construction Company

The John D. Rockefeller Jr. Library, nicknamed "the Rock", is the primary teaching and research library for the humanities, social sciences, and fine arts at Brown University in Providence, Rhode Island. It is one of five individual libraries which make up the Brown University Library.

The library was named after John D. Rockefeller Jr., who graduated in the class of 1897. The building was constructed between 1962 and 1964 and designed by Danforth Toan. The building drew attention as the first building in the area constructed in the Brutalist style, and alongside the Sciences Library, Graduate Center, and List Art Building, is one of the campus's four significant examples of Brutalist architecture.

The library houses Brown University's East Asian Collection, which started in 1961 after Charles Sidney Gardner donated about 30,000 volumes, most of them Chinese. In 1965, a Federal grant led to the formal establishment of the East Asia Language and Area Center, which has since become the East Asian Studies Department. The university began to acquire Japanese works after a grant was received in 1980. The collection itself now includes a Korean collection.

The most recent renovations of the "Rock" include the creation of the David and Laura Finn Reading Room (2009), the Patrick Ma Digital Scholarship Lab (2012) and the main floor reading room (2014).

The John D. Rockefeller Jr. library should not be confused with the Cambridge University Library at the University of Cambridge which was built with funds from John D. Rockefeller and is colloquially referred to as the Rockefeller Library.

== See also ==
- Annmary Brown Memorial
- John Hay Library
- Orwig Music Library
- Sciences Library (Brown University)
- John Carter Brown Library
- List of libraries in Rhode Island

== References and external links ==
- Rockefeller Library
