= Wanskuck Library-Providence Community Library =

- Wanskuck Library-Community Libraries of Providence
- U.S. National Register of Historic Places
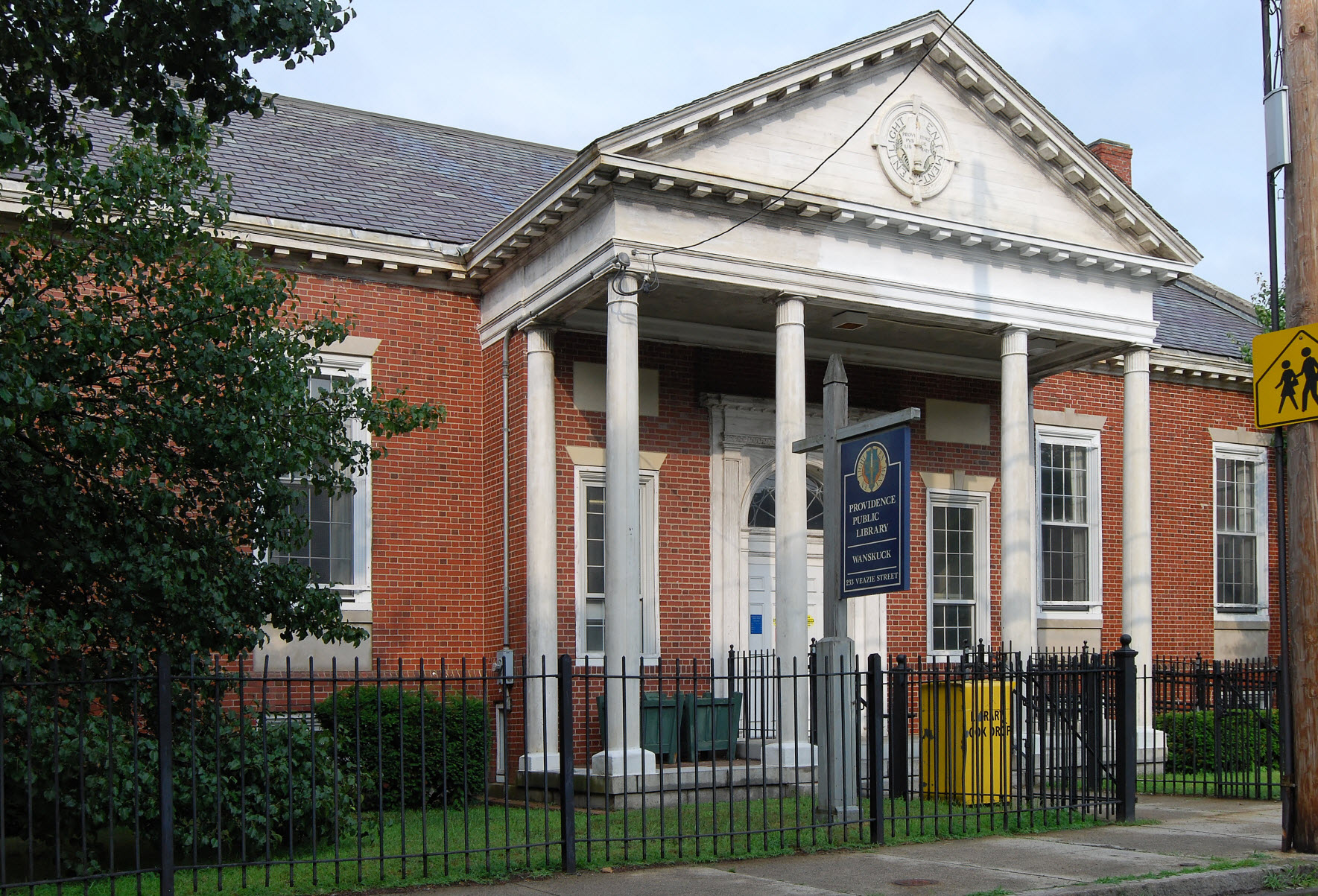

- Location within Rhode Island Location within the United States
- Location: Providence, Rhode Island
- Coordinates: 41°51′4″N 71°26′5″W
- Built: 1928
- Architect: Clarke & Howe; Balchin Construction Co.
- Architectural style: Colonial Revival
- MPS: Branch Buildings of Providence Community Library MPS
- NRHP reference No.: 98000217
- Added to NRHP: March 5, 1998

The Wanskuck Library—A Community Library of Providence is an historic branch library building at 233 Veazie Street in Providence, Rhode Island. It is a single-story brick and stone structure, built in 1928, replacing an earlier library building which had originally housed a library established by the Wanskuck Mill Company for its employees. The building was designed by Clarke & Howe, and is an excellent local example of Colonial Revival design, with a tetrastyle entrance portico. It was the first of ten libraries built based on Howe designs.

The building was listed on the National Register of Historic Places in 1998.

== See also ==
- National Register of Historic Places listings in Providence, Rhode Island
- Rochambeau Library
- South Providence Library
- Smith Hill Library
- Fox Point Library
- Mount Pleasant Library
- Olneyville Library
- Washington Park Library
- Knight Memorial Library
