= Rochambeau Library-Providence Community Library =

- Rochambeau Library-Community Libraries of Providence
- U.S. National Register of Historic Places
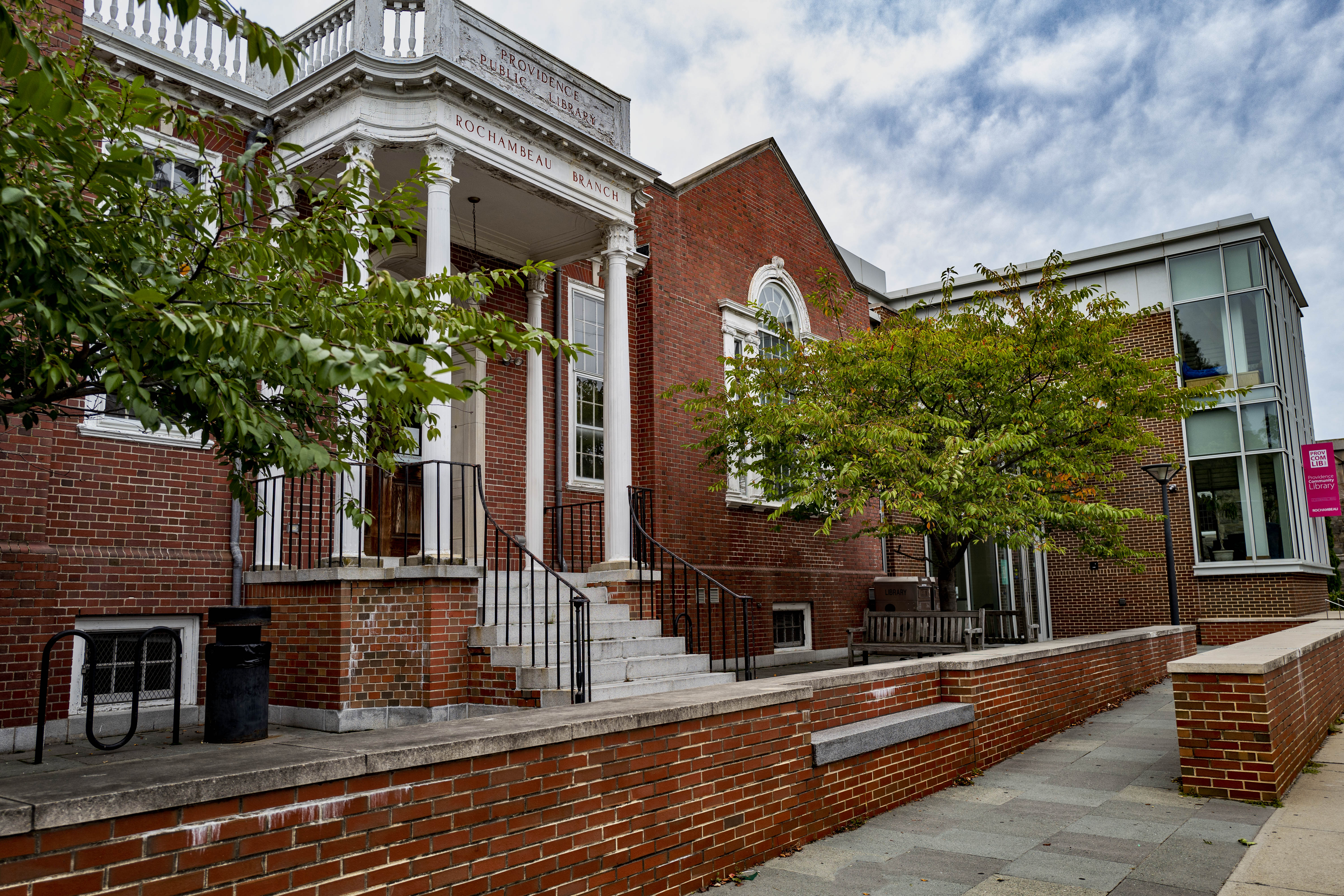

- Location within Rhode Island Location within the United States
- Location: Providence, Rhode Island
- Coordinates: 41°50′46″N 71°23′50″W
- Built: 1930
- Built by: O. D. Purington & Company
- Architect: Howe & Church
- Architectural style: Colonial Revival
- MPS: Branch Buildings of Providence Public Library MPS
- NRHP reference No.: 98000215
- Added to NRHP: March 5, 1998

The Rochambeau Library— A Community Library of Providence is an historic public library building at 708 Hope Street in Providence, Rhode Island. It was originally a single-story brick structure with limestone trim, designed by Wallis E. Howe and built in 1930. It has a symmetrical main facade, with the entrance in the center, sheltered by a porch supported by fluted Corinthian columns. The flanking bays are pavilions with gable fronts. A modern two-level addition with a glass front has been made to the north side of the building.

The building was listed on the National Register of Historic Places in 1998.

== See also ==
- National Register of Historic Places listings in Providence, Rhode Island
- Wanskuck Library-Community Libraries of Providence
- South Providence Library-Community Libraries of Providence
- Smith Hill Library-Community Libraries of Providence
- Fox Point Library-Community Libraries of Providence
- Mount Pleasant Library-Community Libraries of Providence
- Olneyville Library-Community Libraries of Providence
- Washington Park Library-Community Libraries of Providence
- Knight Memorial Library-Community Libraries of Providence
