= List of Brown University buildings =

The following is a list of buildings at Brown University. Five buildings are listed with the United States Department of the Interior's National Register of Historic Places: University Hall (1770), Nightingale–Brown House (1792), Gardner House (1806), Corliss–Brackett House (1887), and the Ladd Observatory (1891).

== Academic facilities ==
Building	Image	Architect	Built	Location	Notes	Ref
Andrews House		Ogden Codman Jr.	1900-1901	13 Brown St.	Home to the Cogut Institute for the Humanities. Designed as a private home for Alfred M. Coats and used as the governor's mansion by R. Livingston Beeckman, the building became the university's first Faculty Club in 1922. It was named in honor of President E. Benjamin Andrews to serve as Brown's infirmary and Health Services from 1939 to 2021.	
195 Angell Street			1902		Also known as the Providence Telephone Company Building, 195 Angell Street is occupied by the Department of Language Studies and was previously home to The Brown Daily Herald.	
Alumnae Hall		Andrews, Jones, Biscoe and Whitmore	1927	194 Meeting St.	Built of brick with limestone trim, Alumnae Hall was designed to accommodate the social and religious activities of the Women's College. Its main entrance features a balustraded stone terrace.	
Applied Math Building		Architecture Research Office	2015	170 Hope St.	The Applied Math Building provides office space for applied mathematics faculty, graduate students, postdoctoral researchers, and visitors, as well as meeting and seminar rooms.	
Arnold Laboratory		Clarke & Howe	1915	91 Waterman St.	Built with a donation from Dr. Oliver H. Arnold (class of 1865), Arnold Laboratory was designed as lab space for the biological sciences. Currently, the building houses many of the administrative offices of the Division of Biology and Medicine.	
Barus and Holley Building		Sherwood, Mills & Smith	1963–1965	184 Hope St.	Named for faculty member and physicist Carl Barus and engineer Alexander Lyman Holley (class of 1853), Barus and Holley is home to the university's Physics Department and School of Engineering. At opening, the seven-story building contained approximately 130 offices and over 80 labs. In 2025, this building became the site of a school shooting that killed 2 and injured 9.	
Barus Hall		Angell & Swift	1885	340 Brook St.	Barus Hall was built as the carriage house of the Henry and Elizabeth Pearce Estate. The address is sometimes listed as 21 Manning St.	
88 Benevolent Street			1867		88 Benevolent Street is home to the offices of WBRU and The Brown Daily Herald.	
Biomedical Center (BMC)		Shepley Bulfinch	1969	171 Meeting Street		
Blistein House			1867	57 Waterman St.	Blistein House is named for Elmer Blistein, Professor of Shakespeare.	
68 1/2 Brown Street		LLB	2001		68 1/2 Brown Street is occupied by the Department of Literary Arts.	
70 Brown Street		LLB (2001)	1850, 2001		A single building integrated with the Italianate Samuel B. Wheaton House at 107 Angell Street houses Brown's English department.	
59 Charlesfield Street		James C. Bucklin, Ed Wojcik Architects	1877, 2018		Also known as the William D. Fuller House, 59 Charlesfield Street is part of the Watson Institute and is home to the Taubman Center for American Politics and Policy.	
Churchill House		Thornton and Thornton	1907	155 Angell St.	Originally built for the Rhode Island Women's Club. Acquired in 1970 for the Africana Studies Department and the Rites and Reason Theatre. Renovated and expanded in 2022-23.	
Corliss-Brackett House		George Henry Corliss	1875–1882	45 Prospect St.	The Corliss-Bracket House was built by George Henry Corliss, inventor of the Corliss Steam Engine and later acquired by Charles Brackett, a motion picture writer, who donated the house to the university. The house has been listed with the National Register of Historic Places since 1970. The building is occupied by the Department of Philosophy, having previously been used by the Admission Office.	
Dyer House		John Holden Greene	1822	150 Power St.	Dyer House is used by the Department of American Studies.	
Edward W. Kassar House			1884	151 Thayer St.	Originally built for Nancy Bishop, the University acquired the house in 1977 and named the building in honor of Edward W. Kassar. Gould Laboratory, a 1982 addition, was integrated with Kassar in 1993 to form a unified building for the Mathematics Department designed by William Kite Architects.	
Engineering Research Center		KieranTimberlake	2018	345 Brook St.	This three-story facility features a 4,000-square-foot clean room for nanotechnology and electronics research. It has 20 lab modules which support large, collaborative research groups.	
Feinstein House			1917	130 Hope St.	Feinstein House is used by the Department of Anthropology.	
Frederick Lippitt and Mary Ann Lippitt House			1865	96 Waterman St.	Built as a Second Empire-style residence, 96 Waterman houses the Center for the Study of Race and Ethnicity in America.	
Friedman Hall		Gould & Angell (1891), Anmahian Winton (2018)	1891, 2018	90 George St.	Originally built as "Wilson Hall," the building was extensively renovated in 2017–2018 and re-dedicated as Friedman Hall.	
Geo-Chem Building		Davis, Brody and Associates and Russo and Sonder	1982	156 George Street	Home to the Department of Chemistry and Department of Earth, Environmental, and Planetary Sciences	
155 George Street			1930		155 George Street is the main department office for the Department of Modern Culture and Media.	
180 George Street		Philip Johnson	1961		The Computing Laboratory was built to house an IBM7070 computer. The building was reassigned for the use of the Applied Mathematics Division with the opening of the Center for Information Technology in 1988.	
182 George Street		Angell & Swift	1885		The Henry and Elizabeth Pearce Estate. Designed by Providence architects Angell and Swift in the Romanesque Revival style, after Henry Hobson Richardson. Brown purchased the main house in 1952.	
Gerard House		Alpheus C. Morse (renovated)	1838, 1867	54 College St.	Originally named the Whipple-Slater House, the Samuel N. Gerard House houses the department of East Asian Studies	
Giddings House			1908	128 Hope St.	Bryant University bought the residence at 128 Hope St. in 1961 to use as a library. In 1962, the university added a new wing to the building. Today, the building is used by the Department of Anthropology.	
Gould Laboratory		William Kite Architects	1982		Built as an addition to Kassar House to house the Computer Sciences Department, it was integrated with Kassar in 1993 to form a unified building for the Mathematics	
Perry and Marty Granoff Center for the Creative Arts	Granoff Center (Brown)	Diller Scofidio + Renfro	2011	154 Angell St.	The Granoff Center is a 38,815 square-foot visual and performing arts facility. The building houses a 218-seat auditorium and is noted for its distinctive facade.	
Grant Recital Hall		Brian Healy Architects (renovation)	1845, 2013	105 Benevolent St.	The Grant Recital Hall and its neighboring buildings were constructed as sables and service buildings for the since-demolished Sprague-Hidden house.	
Grimshaw-Gudewicz Medical Building		Shepley Bulfinch	1990	175 Meeting Street	A six-story addition to the Bio-Medical Center	
Hirschfeld House			1900	163 George St.	Named for Elie and Sarah Hirschfeld, the Hirschfeld House is home to the university's Judaic Studies department	
190 Hope Street		William R. Walker	1865		Also known as the John A Mitchell house, 190 Hope Street houses the university's Italian and German Studies Departments.	
Horace Mann House		Richard Upjohn	1854	47 George St.	Built for Seth Adams Jr. in 1854, this brick Italianate double house (or duplex) building at 47-49 (formerly 24-26) George Street was designed by Richard Upjohn, first president of the American Institute of Architects. Built as an investment property, the building initially served as luxury rental apartments. Purchased by Brown University, it was renovated in 1838–1839 as a residence hall for students, first named Magee House and then renamed Horace Mann House in 1940. It has since housed the English Department and now the Brown Graduate School and the Office of the Vice President for Research.	
Lincoln Field Building		Clarke & Howe	1903	180 Thayer St.	The Lincoln Field Building was originally built for the school of engineering. Today, the building is used by the Department of Earth, Environmental, and Planetary Sciences.	
Lindemann Performing Arts Center		REX	2023	130 Angell St.	An innovative performance hall which can be configured into different stage and audience configurations	
List Art Center		Philip Johnson	1971	64 College St.	The five-story List Art Center houses the Visual Arts Department, the History of Art and Architecture Department, and the David Winton Bell Gallery.	
Lyman Hall		Stone, Carpenter & Willson; Leslie Armstrong	1891, 1977	83 Waterman St.	Originally built as Lyman Gymnasium, Lyman Hall functioned as an athletic facility until 1946 when all sports activities were moved to Marvel Gymnasium.	
MacFarlane House			1838, 1867	48 College St.	Originally known as the William J. King House, the building is currently known as the MacFarlane House and used as the main office of the school's Classics Department.	
Medical Research Lab			1965	89 Waterman St.	Contains academic and research spaces for Brown's Division of Biology and Medicine.	
Meiklejohn House			1900	159 George St.	Home to the Department of Portuguese and Brazilian Studies.	
W. Duncan MacMillan Hall		Koetter, Kim & Associates	1998	167 Thayer St.	The building was named for Whitney Duncan MacMillan, the principal benefactor. It houses facilities for chemistry, geology and environmental sciences research and instruction.	
Manning Hall	Manning Hall (Brown) cropped	Russell Warren, William Tallman, James C. Bucklin	1834	21 Prospect St.	Manning Hall houses the Haffenreffer Museum of Anthropology's exhibitions and Manning Chapel.	
Marston Hall		William W. Bosworth	1926	346 Brook St.	Marston Hall was commissioned in 1918 and dedicated in 1926 as the Marston Hall of Modern Languages. The Indiana limestone building today houses the Department of Slavic Studies.	
Maxcy Hall		Hoppin, Read & Hoppin	1895	108 George St.	Maxcy Hall was designed as a combined academic and residential building. The building remained in use as a dormitory until 1959. Today, the building houses the Sociology and Urban Studies Departments. Notable residents include Ted Turner.	
Metcalf Chemistry and Research Laboratory		Day & Klauder	1923, 1938	190 Thayer St.	Originally built in 1923 and 1938, the Metcalf Chemistry and Research Laboratory was extensively renovated from 2011 to 2012. The building now houses the Department of Cognitive, Linguistic, and Psychological Sciences.	
Morrison-Gerard Studio			1845	151 Hope St.		
Nelson Center for Entrepreneurship (Leased)		ZDS Architects	2019	249 Thayer Street		
Nicholson House		Stone & Carpenter	1878–1879	71 George St.	Originally built for Francis W. Goddard, Nicholson House is named in honor of Mr. and Mrs. Samuel C. Nicholson, president of the Nicholson File Company and former owner of the house. Brown used it for administrative offices, until 2017, when it became home to the dept of American Studies. 71 George Street.	
Norwood House			1862	82 Waterman St.	Previously known as the Benjamin Stevens House, the Norwood House is used by Brown's American Civilization Program	
The Packet Building	The Packet Building	Fenton Keyes and Associates	1970	155 South Main Street	Purchased in 2021 for expansion of the School of Public Health	
Partridge Hall		Alpheus C. Morse	1894	68 Brown St.	Currently houses the Brown Center for Students of Color (BCSC), which was formerly known as the Third World Center.	
Pembroke Hall		Stone, Carpenter & Willson, Toshiko Mori	1897, renovated 2008	172 Meeting St.	Pembroke Hall was the first building of the Women's College, intended to serve all their academic, religious, social, and athletic needs. It houses the Pembroke Center for Teaching and Research on Women.	
Peter Green House		LLB (2007), KITE Architects (2019)	1868, 2007, 2019	79 Brown St.	Purchased by Brown in 1966 as the "Lippit-Guild House," the building was renovated in 1999 using funds donated by alumnus Peter Green. In 2007 the building was moved from its former location on 142 Angell St. to 79 Brown Street and in 2019 the building was connected to the adjacent Sharpe House.	
Prospect House			1871	36 Prospect St.	Home to the Department of Comparative Literature	
Prince Engineering Laboratory		Sherwood, Mills & Smith	1962	355 Brook St.	Part of the engineering complex, Prince Engineering Laboratory is named for Frank John Prince (director of the Universal Match Corporation of St. Louis) and is home to research in structure and materials, thermodynamics, and fluid mechanics.	
Rhode Island Hall		Tallman & Bucklin	1840, 2009	60 George St.	Rhode Island Hall, so named because the majority of the funds for erecting the building came from Rhode Island residents, was originally built to house classrooms and laboratory space for the Departments of Natural Philosophy, Chemistry, Mineralogy, Geology, and Natural History. The building was renovated in 2009 and currently houses the Joukowsky Institute for Archaeology and the Ancient World	
Robinson Hall		William R. Walker, Thomas Gould	1878	64 Waterman St.	Robinson Hall was originally built as Brown's "New Library" of 1878. The octagonal building was built in the Venetian-Gothic style and features a central rotunda. The building was referred to as the Old Library following the construction of the John Hay Library. Robinson Hall now houses the Department of Economics..	
Rochambeau House		Parker, Thomas & Rice	1929	84 Prospect St.	Originally built for Mary Elizabeth and Henry Dexter Sharpe, the Rochambeau House is now used by the Department of French Studies and Department of Hispanic Studies. The house's garden was designed by noted landscape architect Marion Coffin.	
Salomon Center		Alpheus C. Morse, Goody, Clancy and Associates	1862, 1989	79 Waterman St.	The largest lecture hall at Brown, located centrally on campus.	
Sayles Hall		Alpheus C. Morse	1881	81 Waterman St.	This Romanesque hall was built as a memorial to William Clark Sayles. The building holds the Sayles Hall Hutchings-Votey Organ, which is the largest extant organ of its type.	
Sharpe House		Alpheus C. Morse (1872), Kite Architects (2019)	1872, 2019	79 Brown St.(formerly 130 Angell St.)	Built for Lucien Sharpe in 1872, Brown acquired half of the building—then a duplex—in 1921. At the time, the building was used to house women attending Pembroke College. In 2018 and 2019 the building was moved and connected to the Peter Green House.	
70 Ship Street		Monks & Johnson, Tsoi Kobus Design	1912		Originally known as the Doran Speidel Building. Home to the Laboratories for Molecular Medicine.	
Shirley Miller House	Shirley Miller House (Brown)	Clarke & Howe	1915	59 George St.	Originally known as the Irene M. Butler House	
Sidney E. Frank Hall for Life Sciences		The Ballinger Company	2006	185 Meeting St.	A five-story, 169,000-square-foot glass and brick structure devoted to the study of human biology. It is named for liquor magnate Sidney Frank, Brown Class of 1942, and the university's largest donor up to that time.	
Smith-Buonanno Hall		Stone, Carpenter & Willson	1907	95 Cushing St.	Built as the women's gymnasium and originally known as Sayles Gym. Extensively renovated in 2000 by KITE Architects.	
121 South Main Street		Edward Larrabee Barnes	1984		Purchased in 2005, 121 South Main Street is an 11-story building located along the Providence River in Providence's central business district. Originally Built for the Old Stone Corporation, the building is now home to the School of Public Health and ICERM.	
Steinert Hall			1966	148 Power St.	Steinert Hall was originally built as the Student Activities Center of Bryant College. The building was sold to Brown in 1969.	
Stephen Robert Hall		Toshiko Mori	2018	280 Brook St.	Part of the Watson Institute for International and Public Affairs.	
2 Stimson Avenue		Alpheus C. Morse	1861		Originally known as the Amos Beckwith House, this building now houses the Swearer Center. Named for Howard Robert Swearer, the center provides support programs and resources to allow students to integrate public service into their education.	
T.F. Green Hall		E. Garder Jacobs, C. Richard Ortoleva	1957, 2003	7 Young Orchard St.	Originally built by Bryant College as "Jacobs Hall"	
135 Thayer Street			1928		135 Thayer Street is used by the Department of Modern Culture and Media	
Thomas Whitaker house		John Holden Greene	1821	67 George St.		
Urban Environmental Lab		Alpheus C. Morse	1885	135 Angell St	The Urban Environmental Lab (UEL) is housed in the Lucien Sharpe Carriage House	
Walter Hall			1857	80 Waterman St.	Originally known as the John F. Chaplin House	
70 Waterman Street			1859, 1980		Francis E. Cross House	
85 Waterman Street (formerly known as Hunter Laboratory)		Perry, Shaw, Hepburn and Dean, Toshiko Mori	1958, 2014		Hunter Laboratory went through major renovations in 2014 by Toshiko Mori Architects, which focused on making the building more environmentally friendly. This included LEED gold certification due to revamping the temperature control systems, adding a greywater system, and adding a greenhouse to the roof to replace the Plant Environmental Center, which was converted into a green. It now houses the Institute at Brown for Environment and Society.	
131 Waterman Street			1852		This building was constructed as an Italianate residence and known as the Levi Salisbury House. The building is now used by the BrainGate team.	
133 Waterman Street			1885		133 Waterman Street is home to the Center for the Study of Human Development. Founded in 1967, the center focuses on research and teaching in the fields of child and adolescent development.	
137 Waterman Street			1910			
Watson Center for Information Technology (CIT)		Cambridge Seven Associates	1988	115 Waterman St.	The Watson CIT is named for Thomas J. Watson Sr.	
Watson Institute for International and Public Affairs		Rafael Viñoly	2001	111 Thayer St.	The programs of the Watson Institute, originally housed in five separate locations on campus, moved into this building in January 2002.	
Wilbour Hall		Stone, Carpenter & Willson	1888	2 Prospect St.	Named for Charles Edwin Wilbour	

== Administrative buildings ==
Building	Image	Architect	Built	Location	Notes	Ref
20 Benevolent Street			1820		Also known as the Jonathan Pike House, 20 Benevolent is home to the Office of Student Life.	
26 Benevolent Street			1823		26 Benevolent, also known as the Seth Adams House, is the current home of the Sarah Doyle Women's Center.	
Brown Office Building		Kent, Cruise & Partners, Architecture Research Office	1969, 2018	164 Angell St.	Home to the Brown University Bookstore, the Brown Office Building also contains the Carney Institute for Brain Science, Data Science Initiative, and Center for Computational Molecular Biology.	
38 Charlesfield Street			1845		Originally built by Robert Purkis and deeded to Brown University in 1946, the home was originally located across the street and moved to its current location in 1950, coinciding with the construction of Wriston Quadrangle. Currently, the house is used for admin support.	
3 Davol Square (leased)					Located in the Jewelry District, 3 Davol Square is home to the administrative systems groups of Computing and Information Services. The Help Desk, Service & Repair and computer operations are located in the Watson Center of Information Technology.	
110 Elm Street (leased)			1848		Originally built by the Phenix Iron Foundry and once on the Providence Preservation Society's "Most Endangered Properties List", Brown University has since restored 110 Elm Street, where the Development Office is now located.	
8 Fones Alley			1900		8 Fones Alley is home to the Financial Aid Office.	
25 George Street			1913			
Grad Center E		Shepley, Bulfinch, Richardson & Abbott	1968	42 Charlesfield St.	A four-story building surrounded by the four Grad Center residence halls, Grad Center E is home to the Office of Summer & Continuing Studies, contains an athletic and recreational center named the Bear's Lair, and also is home to the Brown University Faculty and Graduate School Club (better known as the Graduate Center Bar).	
Hemisphere Building			1989	167 Angell Street	The Hemisphere Building is home to Brown's CareerLAB.	
Maddock Alumni Center		Stone & Carpenter (~1882 addition)	~1830	38 Brown St.	Maddock Alumni Center is located in the former home of Chancellor William Goddard (class of 1846). Goddard's daughter deeded the house to the University in 1940, and in 1974, the center was named in honor of Paul L. Maddock (class of 1933), the principal donor in its restoration. The building is currently occupied by the Alumni Relations.	
Page-Robinson Hall		Robinson, Green & Beretta, LLB Architects	1962	69 Brown St.	Originally built as the J. Walter Wilson Laboratory, as the Biology department had outgrown the Arnold Lab. The Sol Koffler wing was added in 1983. In 2008 the building was renovated by LLB Architects to house student-oriented administrative services and classrooms. Renamed after alumni Inman E. Page and Ethel Tremaine Robinson in 2018.	
Stonewall House		KITE Architects (2022 renovation)	1816, 2022	22 Benevolent St.	Also known as the Sylvanus and Samuel Tingley, Jr. House. Houses Brown's LGBTQ Center since 2022.	
University Hall		Joseph Brown (likely); Perry, Shaw and Hepburn	1770	1 Prospect St.	The first building of Brown University, University Hall was originally called the "College Edifice." Until 1832, the building housed the entire institution, containing residential rooms, lecture and recitation rooms, a chapel, a library, and a dining hall. Currently, University Hall is home to several administrative offices, including the president's office, the Office of the Provost, Office of the Registrar, and the dean of the college. The building was designated a National Historic Landmark in 1962.	

== Libraries ==
Building	Image	Architect	Built	Location	Notes	Ref
Annmary Brown Memorial		Norman Isham	1903–1907	21 Brown St.	The Annmary Brown Memorial is home to exhibits of European and American paintings from the 17th through the 20th centuries as well as the a Mazansky British Sword Collection. Rush Hawkins built the memorial in memory of his wife, Annmary Brown Hawkins (granddaughter of Nicholas Brown), both of whom are entombed in a crypt at the rear of the memorial.	
John Carter Brown Library		Shepley, Rutan and Coolidge	1904	94 George St.	The John Carter Brown Library, named for John Carter Brown (the son of Nicholas Brown), is an independently funded research library of the humanities housing one of the world's finest collections of rare books and maps relating to the European discovery, exploration, settlement, and development of the New World until circa 1820.	
John D. Rockefeller Jr. Library		Warner, Burns, Toan, Lunde	1962–1964	10 Prospect St.	John D. Rockefeller Jr. Library, named for John D. Rockefeller Jr. (class of 1897), is the primary teaching and research library for the humanities, social sciences, and fine arts.	
John Hay Library		Shepley, Rutan and Coolidge	1910	20 Prospect St.	The second library built by Brown University (the first being Robinson Hall, now home to the Economics Department), the John Hay Library served as the main library of the university until the completion of the John D. Rockefeller Jr. Library. The library, named for John Hay (class of 1858), now houses the University's special collections and the University Archives.	
Library Collections Annex			1969	10 Park Ln.	Opened in 2006, the Library Collections Annex is located 4 miles (6.4 km) from Brown University's main campus. The Annex is a storage facility with a capacity of approximately 1.7 million volumes.	
Orwig Music Center		Carrère and Hastings (remodel)	1850 (1988 addition)	1 Young Orchard Ave.	Named for Benton B. Orwig (class of 1920), the Orwig Music Center is home to the Virginia Baldwin Orwig Music Library, which houses the general music collection, including music books, scores, periodicals, sound recordings, videotapes and microforms.	
Sciences Library		Warner, Burns, Toan and Lunde	1969–1971	201 Thayer St	A 14-story building completed in the Brutalist architectural style, the Sciences Library houses the University's collection of science volumes as well as the Friedman Study Center.	

== Residential buildings ==
=== Residence halls ===
==== East Campus ====
The East Campus was originally the main campus location of Brown's former neighbor Bryant College. Brown purchased Bryant's campus in 1969 for $5.0 million when the latter school moved to a new campus in Smithfield, Rhode Island. This added 10 acres (40,000 m^{2}) of land adjacent to Brown's existing campus. In 1971, the area formerly occupied by Bryant was officially designated as East Campus.

Building	Image	Architect	Built	Location	Notes	Reference
Barbour Hall			1904	100 Charlesfield St.	Barbour Hall is named for Brown's 10th president, Clarence Barbour.	
Barbour Hall Apartments		LLB	1968		The Barbour Hall Apartments were opened in October 1968 as "Appleby Hall" and sold to Brown the following year.	
Chen Family Hall		Deborah Berke Partners	2023	250 Brook St.	250 and 259 Brook combined house about 350 sophomores, juniors and seniors.	
William & Ami Danoff Hall		Deborah Berke Partners	2023	259 Brook St.	250 and 259 Brook combined house about 350 sophomores, juniors and seniors.	
Grad Center A		Shepley, Bulfinch, Richardson & Abbott	1968	40 Charlesfield St.		
Grad Center B		Shepley, Bulfinch, Richardson & Abbott	1968	44 Charlesfield St.		
Grad Center C		Shepley, Bulfinch, Richardson & Abbott	1968	82 Thayer St.		
Grad Center D		Shepley, Bulfinch, Richardson & Abbott	1968	90 Thayer St.		
King House		Stone, Carpenter & Willson	1895	154 Hope St.	Originally the administration building for Bryant College and named Taft House for its first owner Robert W. Taft, King House was renamed in 1974 in honor of Lida Shaw King, former dean of Pembroke College. Currently, the building serves as a residence hall and home to one of the university's program houses, St. Anthony Hall.	
Perkins Hall		Kent, Cruise & Aldrich	1960	154 Power St.	Opened as Gardner Hall for Bryant College, the residence hall was later renamed Perkins Hall in 1974 in honor of Judge Fred B. Perkins (class of 1919). Today the building is occupied entirely by sophomores. Notable residents of Perkins include Norm Eisen.	
Sternlicht Commons and Health & Wellness Center		William Rawn Associates	2021	450 Brook St.	Combines a health center with a residence hall. Named for alumnus Barry Sternlicht.	
Young Orchard 2		Robinson Green Beretta	1973	2 Young Orchard Ave.		
Young Orchard 4		Robinson Green Beretta	1973	4 Young Orchard Ave.		
Young Orchard 10		Robinson Green Beretta	1973	10 Young Orchard Ave.		
Vartan Gregorian Quad A		Davis Brody Bond	1991	103 Thayer St.		
Vartan Gregorian Quad B	Vartan Gregorian Quad B (Brown) 2	Davis Brody Bond	1991	101 Thayer St.		

==== Keeney Quadrangle ====
Keeney Quadrangle (originally named West Quadrangle) opened in 1957 as, in the words of President Barnaby Keeney, a place "to provide a dignified and happy home for the independents." The quadrangle was dedicated to Keeney in 1982.

Containing 6 houses, the quadrangle houses approximately 585 students.

Building	Image	Architect	Built	Location	Notes	Ref
Archibald House		Thomas Mott Shaw	1955–1957	17 Benevolent St.	Named for Raymond Clare Archibald, professor of mathematics from 1909 to 1943, Archibald House is a First Year hall, containing mostly double occupancy rooms. Notable residents include Thomas Mallon.	
Bronson House		Thomas Mott Shaw	1955–1957	17 Benevolent St.	Named for Walter Cochrane Bronson (class of 1887), professor of English from 1892 to 1927, Bronson House is a First Year hall, containing mostly double occupancy rooms.	
Everett House		Thomas Mott Shaw	1955–1957	13 Benevolent St.	Named for Walter Goodnow Everett (class of 1885), professor of Latin, philosophy, and natural theology from 1890 to 1930, Everett House is a First Year hall, containing mostly double occupancy rooms.	
Jameson House		Thomas Mott Shaw	1955–1957	11 Benevolent St.	Named for John Franklin Jameson, professor of history from 1888 to 1901, Jameson House is a First Year hall, containing mostly double occupancy rooms.	
Mead House		Thomas Mott Shaw	1955–1957	11 Benevolent St.	Named for Albert Davis Mead, professor biology from 1895 to 1930 and vice-president of the University from 1925 to 1936, Mead House is a First Year hall, containing mostly double occupancy rooms.	
Poland House		Thomas Mott Shaw	1955–1957	13 Benevolent St.	Named for William Carey Poland (class of 1868), professor of classics from 1870 to 1892 and professor of art history from 1892 to 1950, Poland House is a First Year hall, containing mostly double occupancy rooms.	

==== Main Campus ====
Building	Image	Architect	Built	Location	Notes	Ref
Caswell Hall		Hoppin & Ely	1903	168 Thayer St.	Named for Alexis Caswell, Brown's 6th president. Notable residents include Lester Frank Ward and Zechariah Chafee.	
Hegeman Hall		Day & Klauder	1926	128 George St.	Notable residents include Thomas J. Watson Jr.	
Hope College	Hope College (Brown) 3	Daniel Hale and Samuel Staples (masons)	1822	71 Waterman St.	Notable residents include Inman E. Page, Charles Evans Hughes, John Hay, and William Faunce.	
Littlefield Hall	Littlefield Hall (Brown)	Day & Klauder	1925	102 George St.	Notable residents include Emma Watson, John F. Kennedy Jr., and Joe Paterno	
Minden Hall		Frank W. Woods	1912	121 Waterman St.	Built as a hotel and later used as a residence hall for nearby Johnson & Wales University	
Slater Hall		Stone & Carpenter	1879	10 George St.	The second purpose-built dormitory constructed at Brown. Notable residents include John D. Rockefeller Jr., Alexander Meiklejohn, and Wallace Wade.	

==== Pembroke Campus ====
Building	Image	Architect	Built	Location	Notes	Ref
Andrews Hall		Thomas Mott Shaw	1947	211 Bowen St.	Named for Elisha Benjamin Andrews.	
Champlin Hall		Robert C. Dean of Perry, Shaw, Hepburn and Dean	1960	208 Meeting St.	One of six freshman dormitories.	
Emery Hall		Robert C. Dean of Perry, Shaw, Hepburn and Dean	1963	200 Meeting St.	Named for Anne Crosby Emery Allinson, the second dean of Pembroke College	
Machado House		Parker, Thomas & Rice	1912	87 Prospect St.	Named for Spanish poet Antonio Machado	
Metcalf Hall		Andrews, Jaques & Rantoul	1919	98 Cushing St.	The second residence hall to be built for the Women's College, Metcalf Hall was built with a donation from Stephen O. Metcalf. The hall is built directly opposite of Miller Hall, the first residence hall for the Women's College.	
Miller Hall		Andrews, Jaques & Rantoul	1910	118 Cushing St.	Miller Hall, named for Mr. and Mrs. Horace G. Miller who provided funds to build the hall, is a colonial style building of brick with white limestone trim and was the first residence hall built for the Women's College.	
Morriss Hall		Robert C. Dean of Perry, Shaw, Hepburn and Dean	1960	206 Meeting St.		
New Pembroke #1		Donlyn Lyndon	1974	302 Thayer St.		
New Pembroke #2		Donlyn Lyndon	1974	306 Thayer St.		
New Pembroke #3		Donlyn Lyndon	1974	308 Thayer St.		
New Pembroke #4		Donlyn Lyndon	1974	300 Thayer St.		
North House			1900	111 Brown St.	North House is one of the University's environmental program houses, along with West House.	
Plantations House			1896	219 Bowen St.	Also known as the George W. Harris House, Plantations House was built as a residence in the Colonial Revival style	
315 Thayer Street		Frederick Ellis Jackson, LLB	1902, 2012		Designed as the "Cushing Apartments" in 1902, 315 Thayer Street was purchased by the university in 1963.	
West House			1885	91 Brown St.	West House is one of the University's environmental program houses, along with North House.	
Woolley Hall		Robert C. Dean of Perry, Shaw, Hepburn and Dean	1963	202 Meeting St.		

==== Wriston Quadrangle ====
Wriston Quadrangle, built from 1950 to 1952, consists of 9 residential buildings bordered by George Street, Thayer Street, Charlesfield Street, and Brown Street. Fifty-one buildings in total were razed to make space for the development. The buildings were designed to house a fraternity on each end of the building, with independents living in the rooms in between.

At the time the quad was built, many (though not all) of the university's fraternities were in financial trouble and membership numbers struggled due to the limited number of civilian students on campus (much of the university's housing at the time was used for students in the Armed Forces training program). In return for university housing in Wriston Quadrangle, the fraternities were compelled to deed their privately owned houses (many in disrepair) to the university.

The quad still houses the majority of the university's fraternities, sororities, and program houses.

Building	Image	Architect	Built	Location	Notes	Ref
Buxton House		Perry, Shaw and Hepburn	1950–1952	27 Brown St.	Buxton House is named for Colonel G. Edward Buxton Jr. (class of 1902), who was Chairman of the Housing and Development Campaign for Wriston Quadrangle.	
Chapin House		Perry, Shaw and Hepburn	1950–1952	116 Thayer St.	Chapin House is named for Dr. Charles V. Chapin (class of 1876), professor of Physiology. Chapin was Superintendent of Health in Providence for 48 years and pioneered modern methods of treating infectious diseases in the Providence City Hospital. Chapin House is home to both the Theta Alpha fraternity and formerly Harambee House, one of Brown's program houses.	
Diman House		Perry, Shaw and Hepburn	1950–1952	41 Charlesfield St.	Diman House is named for Jeremiah Lewis Diman (class of 1851), professor of history at the university. The building is home to both the Kappa Alpha Theta sorority and Delta Phi fraternity.	
Goddard House		Perry, Shaw and Hepburn	1950–1952	39 Charlesfield St.	Goddard House is named for William Giles Goddard (class of 1812), professor of Moral Philosophy and Metaphysics and of "Belles-Lettres" and trustee and fellow of the university. Goddard House is home to the Alpha Delta Phi Society and Delta Gamma sorority.	
Harkness House		Perry, Shaw and Hepburn	1950–1952	47 Charlesfield St.	Harkness House is named for Professor Albert Harkness (class of 1842), professor of Classics and a fellow of the university from 1904 to 1907. Harkness House is home to both the Kappa Delta sorority and Technology House, one of Brown's program houses.	
Marcy House		Perry, Shaw and Hepburn	1950–1952	115 George St.	Marcy House is named for William L. Marcy (class of 1808), Comptroller of the State of New York, U.S. senator, Governor of New York for three terms, secretary of war, and U.S. secretary of state. Marcy House is houses both the Brown Womxn's Collective program house and the Zeta Delta Xi fraternity.	
Olney House		Perry, Shaw and Hepburn	1950–1952	29 Brown St.	Olney is named for Richard Olney (class of 1856), Attorney General to President Cleveland and U.S. Secretary of State. Olney House is home to the Beta Omega Chi fraternity.	
Sears House		Perry, Shaw and Hepburn	1950–1952	113 George St.	Sears House, named for Barnas Sears (class of 1825), president of the university from 1855 to 1867. The building is home to both the Alpha Chi Omega sorority and Delta Tau fraternity	
Wayland House		Perry, Shaw and Hepburn	1950–1952	31 Brown St.	Wayland House is named for Francis Wayland, president from 1827 to 1855. The building primarily houses Second Year students and Transfer Students.	

== Rental properties ==
Brown owns many properties that it leases to others for various purposes.

Building	Image	Architect	Built	Notes	Ref
127 Angell Street			1853	Also known as the Leonard M. Blodgett House	
129 Angell Street			1849	Also known as the Edward J. Cushing House	
74-80 Benevolent Street			1883	The home features locking mechanisms and security measures developed by the U.S. Secret Service from when Prince Faisal bin Al Hussein of Jordan (Brown class of 1985) lived here.	
84 Benevolent Street			1865		
86 Benevolent Street			1865		
247 Bowen Street			1895	Also known as the Francis A . Cranston House	
251 Bowen Street			1900		
281-283 Brook Street			1880		
287 Brook Street			1970		
291 Brook Street			1970		
456 Brook Street			1885		
71-73 Charlesfield Street			1872	Acquired by Brown in 1969 as part of the purchase of the former site of Bryant College, 71-73 Charlesfield Street was renovated in 2006–2007 to contain 18 studio apartments and two one-bedroom apartments for use by first year graduate students. Originally known as the George Fuller Double House, the building is now known as Milhous and used by the Brown Association for Cooperative Housing.	
108-110 Charlesfield Street			1910		
84-86 Cushing Street			1895		
154 Cushing Street			1895		
166 Cushing Street			1885		
20 Olive Street			1849	20 Olive Street was built in with funds provided by Anna A. Jenkins for the Association for the Benefit of Colored Orphans, a Quaker orphanage founded in 1839. The building was sold in 1952.	
86 Waterman Street			1880		
125-127 Waterman Street			1863		
129 Waterman Street			1871		

== Brown to Brown home ownership ==
Properties provided by the University to faculty and staff.

Building	Image	Architect	Built	Notes	Ref
5 Benevolent Street			1844	Also known as the Henry B. Anthony House.	
66-68 Benevolent Street			1880		
70-72 Benevolent Street			1880		
93 Benevolent Street			1854	Also known as the Edward Bannister House.	
95 Benevolent Street			1885		
97 Benevolent Street			1854	Also known as the Robert Watson House	
99 Benevolent Street			1860		
277 Brook Street			1866		
86 Brown Street			1894		
93 Brown Street			1885		
95 Brown Street			1885		
109 Brown Street			1900		
117 Brown Street			1920		
129 Brown Street			1900		
131-133 Brown Street			1850	Also known as the Albert Dailey House.	
37 Charlesfield Street			1825		
37 George Street			1825	Also known as the Hale-Page-Buffum House.	
134 Hope Street			1910		
126 Power Street			1900		

== Jewelry District ==
Building	Image	Architect	Built	Location	Notes	Ref
55 Claverick Street (Leased)		Bowerman Brothers	1908		Houses Brown's Division of Emergency Medical Services.	
Danoff Laboratories		TenBerke and Ballinger	2027 (expected)	Richmond Street	Seven-story, 300,000-square-foot building will be the largest academic laboratory building in Rhode Island.	
339 Eddy Street			1900			
Point 225 (Leased)		Wexford Science & Technology	2019	225 Dyer Street	Houses wet-lab space, Brown's School of Professional Studies, and the Division of Pre-College and Undergraduate Programs.	
222 Richmond Street (Medical Education Building)	Alpert Medical School, Providence, Rhode Island	Frank S. Perry, Ellenzweig	1928		222 Richmond street was built as the Little Nemo Manufacturing Company. The structure was converted by Brown for use by the Alpert Medical School. It opened in 2011 as the Medical Education Building.	
River House		SGA	2019	1 Point Street	Brown acquired River House in 2021 for use as graduate and medical student housing.	
South Street Landing		Jenks & Ballou, Tsoi Kobus Design	1912, 1952, 2017	350 Eddy St.	This former power station at 360 Eddy Street in the Jewelry District was completely renovated in 2017 into office space. The building is shared by Brown University, Rhode Island College, and University of Rhode Island.	

== Additional facilities ==
Building	Image	Architect	Built	Location	Notes	Ref
Andrews Memorial Building			2003	295 Lloyd Avenue	The 50,000-square-foot (4,600 m^{2}) building at 295 Lloyd Avenue houses the staff of the Department of Facilities Management. It honors Philip D. Andrews, Plant Operations employee from 1947 to 1990.	
Carrie Tower		Guy Lowell	1904	69 Waterman	Located on the corner of Prospect and Waterman Streets, Carrie Tower is a 95-foot (29 m) tall monument named in honor of Caroline Mathilde Brown, granddaughter of Nicholas Brown. Carved into the granite foundation is the inscription "Love is Strong as Death."	
Center for the Study of Slavery and Justice		Alpheus C. Morse (renovated)	1810	94 Waterman St.	Brown's Center for the Study of Slavery and Justice is housed in a Federal style residence formerly known as the James W.C. Ely House	
Central Heat Plant		Félix Candela	1969	235 Lloyd Ave.	The Central Heat Plant provides heat for over 90 buildings on the university's campus. Undergoing renovations from 2005 to 2008, President Ruth Simmons announced that the plant would reduce greenhouse gas emissions from fossil fuels by 30% by fiscal year 2008.	
75-77 Charlesfield Street			1967		75-77 Charlesfield Street is the headquarters for the Department of Public Safety.	
200 Dyer Street		Oresto DiSaia	1952			
Faculty Club		Alfred Stone	1865	1 Bannister St.	Originally the home of Zachariah Allen a prominent citizen of Providence and 1813 Brown graduate.	
Faunce House		McKim Mead and White, Howe & Church	1904, 1930	75 Waterman St.	Originally named "Rockefeller Hall". Designed by McKim, Mead & White. Currently houses the Stephen Robert '62 Campus Center.	
Fiering House			1865, 2007	79 Charlesfield St.	Originally named Frederick Fuller House, and later Eldridge Hall. Dedicated to former John Carter Brown Library director and librarian Norman Fiering in 2007. Houses fellows in residence for the John Carter Brown Library.	
Fox Point Daycare Center			1961	150 Hope St.	Originally built as Kilcup Hall, Brown purchased the building in 1969 when Bryant College moved from Providence, Rhode Island to Smithfield, Rhode Island. In 1979 the center incorporated as a private nonprofit organization. The University allows the center to use the building rent-free.	
50 John Street			1910		50 John Street is used as a storage facility for the Department of Environmental Health and Safety. In 2003, the space was renovated to accommodate the Department of Theatre, Speech and Dance and the Theatre Consortium. The facility is equipped as a professional shop and supports set design and construction for the Department's mainstage productions.	
Gardner House			1806	106 George St.	Originally built for Joseph Haile, Gardner house bears the name of George Warren Gardner, M.D. (class of 1894) and his wife, Jessie Barker Gardner (class of 1896), the couple who restored the house back to its original condition. Gardner House serves as the guest house for the President of Brown University, lodging distinguished guests and visiting dignitaries.	
125 Hope St.			1819	125 Hope St.	This home, known as the Joseph S. Cooke House, was purchased by Brown in 2023 to serve as the provost's residence.	
Ladd Observatory		Stone, Carpenter & Willson	1891	210 Doyle Ave.	Built on "Tin-top Hill," about a mile from the university's main campus, Ladd Observatory was built through the munificence of Governor Herbert W. Ladd on land donated by Frank W. and Knight D. Cheney. The observatory contains a refractor telescope with lens designed by Professor C. S. Hastings of Yale University. The observatory has been listed with the National Register of Historic Places since 2000.	
Mencoff Hall		Tallman & Bucklin; Stone, Carpenter & Willson (1891 addition)	1844	68 Waterman St.	Mencoff Hall was formerly named the Cabinet Building as it was built to house the cabinet of the Rhode Island Historical Society. The building was acquired by the University in 1942 and currently houses the Population Studies and Training Center.	
Nightingale-Brown House		Caleb Ormsbee	1791, 1862, 1880	357 Benefit St.	Built for Colonel Joseph Nightingale, the Nightingale-Brown House was purchased by Nicholas Brown in 1814 and housed members of the Brown family until 1985. The house is now preserved as the John Nicholas Brown Center for Public Humanities and Cultural Heritage. The house was designated a National Historic Landmark in 1989.	
Pembroke Field House			1938	171 Cushing St	Originally the barn on the estate of Charles T. Aldrich (class of 1877) and Henry L. Aldrich (class of 1876), Pembroke Field House opened in 1938 after renovation financed by various University classes. Currently, the field house is used as a function hall.	
President's House		William Truman Aldrich	1922	55 Power St.	The current President's House, originally built for Rush Sturges and acquired by the University in 1947, is the fourth such home for the University president (the first three have been demolished).	
Sharpe Refectory		Perry, Shaw and Hepburn	1951	144 Thayer St.	Nicknamed "the Ratty" by students, Sharpe Refectory is Brown's largest dining hall.	

=== Parking structures ===
Building	Image	Architect	Built	Location	Notes	Ref
Power Street Garage			1988	101 Power St.	The Power Street Garage is a two-story parking facility with approximately 400 total parking spaces.	
Richmond Garage			1989	280 Richmond St.		

=== Commercial properties ===
Brown University owns several properties that are not yet used to support the institution's mission. These properties are leased to businesses until such time that the university expands into the buildings.

Building	Image	Architect	Built	Location	Notes	Ref
165 Angell Street			1910	College Hill		
83-85 Benevolent Street			1857	College Hill	83-85 Benevolent Street is a restaurant/bar building that has had a variety of tenants.	
172 Cushing Street			1890	College Hill		
200 Chestnut Street			1900	Jewelry District		
1 Davol Square			1900	Jewelry District		
349 Eddy Street			1968	Jewelry District		
365 Eddy Street			1900	Jewelry District		
391-393 Eddy Street			1900	Jewelry District		
205/215 Meeting Street			1983	College Hill		
196 Richmond Street			1920	Jewelry District		
300 Richmond Street			1990	Jewelry District		
271 Thayer Street			1994	College Hill		
272 Thayer Street			1976	College Hill		
307 Thayer Street			1865	College Hill		
118-120 Waterman Street			1970	College Hill		

== Athletic facilities ==
Building	Image	Architect	Built	Location	Notes	Ref
Brown Stadium		Gavin Hadden, Paul Cret	1925		Opened as Brown University Field, Brown Stadium is home to the University's football and outdoor track teams. The stadium is located approximately 1-mile (1.6 km) from main campus and has a capacity of approximately 20,000.	
Center for Lacrosse and Soccer		Architectural Resources Cambridge	2020	Erickson Athletic Complex		
Marston Boat House			1966 (acquired)		The Marston Boat House is located close to India Point Park in Providence along the Seekonk River and is home to Brown's crew team.	
Meehan Auditorium		Perry, Shaw, Hepburn & Dean	1961	Erickson Athletic Complex	Named in honor of George V. Meehan, Meehan Auditorium holds an ice rink for intercollegiate hockey games and also serves as a venue for large indoor events. The auditorium holds 2100, increasing to 5000 when temporary seating covers the ice surface.	
Nelson Fitness Center and Katherine Moran Coleman Aquatics Center		Robert A.M. Stern Architects	2012	Erickson Athletic Complex (225 Hope St.)		
Olney-Margolies Athletic Center		Daniel F. Tully	1981	Erickson Athletic Complex	Named for Joseph Olney and Moe Price Margolies (both class of 1936), the Olney-Margolies Athletic Center contains space for basketball, tennis, and volleyball courts, a six-lane 200-meter track, batting and golf cages, and long jump, high jump, and pole vault pits. There is also a 1.8-acre (7,300 m^{2}) playing field located on the roof.	
Penner Field House		Sasaki	January 2026 (expected)	Erickson Athletic Complex	Named for a donation by the Penner family	
Pizzitola Sports Center		Eggers Group	1987–1988	Erickson Athletic Complex (235 Hope St.)	The Pizzitola Sports Center, named for Paul Bailey Pizzitola (class of 1981), holds the University's courts for basketball, volleyball, and squash as well as facilities for wrestling and gymnastics and four tennis courts. The main competition court seats approximately 2,800.	
Ted Turner Sailing Pavilion		Donald Richardson	2018	3 Shaw Ave. Cranston, RI	The Ted Turner Sailing Center at the Edgewood Yacht Club is used by Brown's sailing team.	
Zucconi Varsity Strength and Conditioning Center			2012	Erickson Athletic Complex		

== See also ==
- List of Brown University statues
