= List of Brown University statues =

Statues at American university

The following is a list of permanent statues and sculptures on the Brown University campus. They are ordered by their date of creation.

== 1906–1950 ==
=== Caesar Augustus (1906) ===
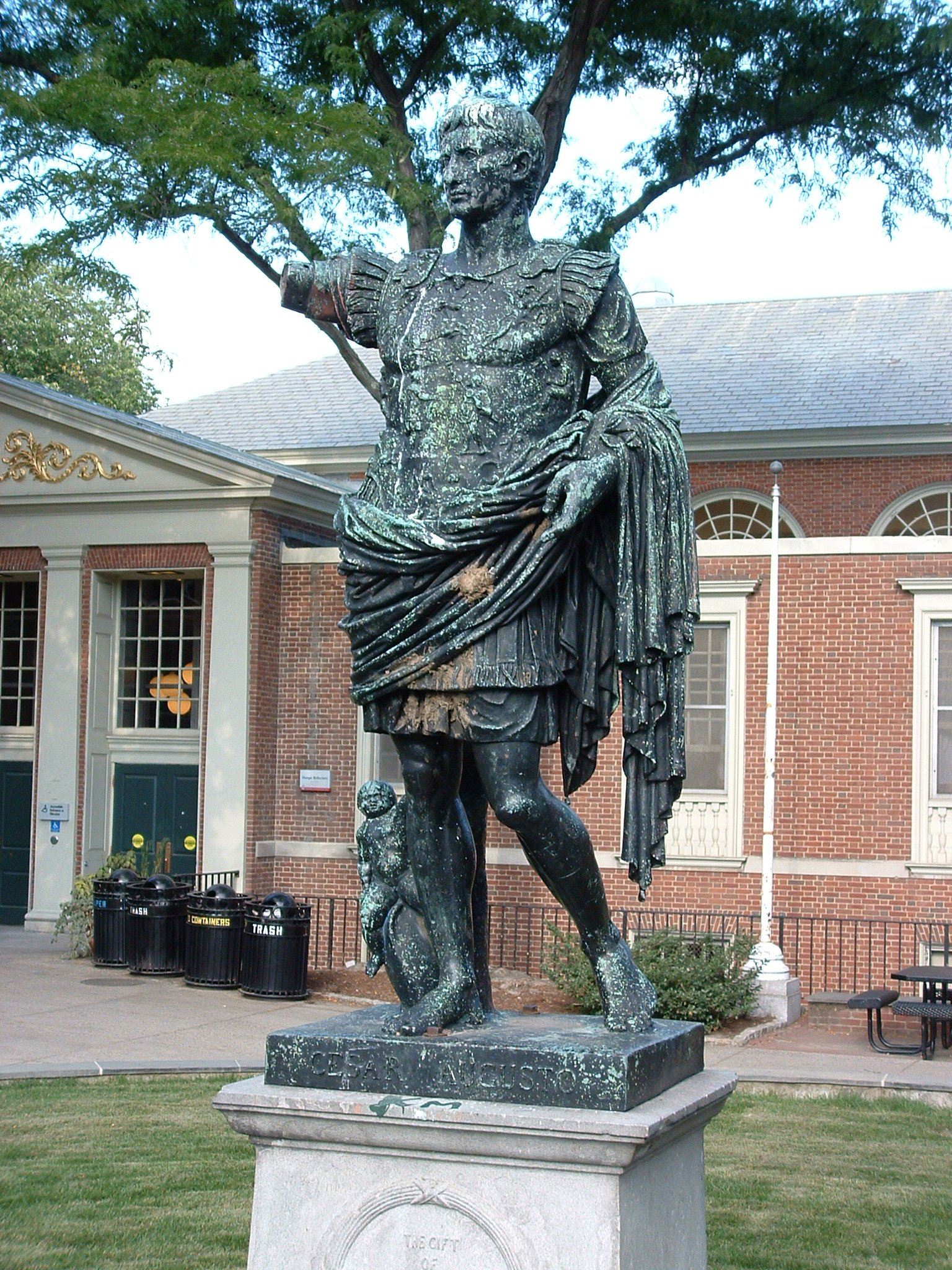
Caesar Augustus

The Caesar Augustus statue stands in front of the Sharpe Refectory in Hughes Court. It was a gift to the university by Moses Brown Ives Goddard in 1906. It is an exact bronze copy of the Vatican Museum's classic Augustus of Prima Porta statue. The statue's arm broke off due to a hurricane that struck Providence in 1938. A replacement arm was subsequently stolen by students, its whereabouts unknown. It was originally located in front of Rhode Island Hall on the Quiet Green, until it was moved to its current location in front of Sharpe Refectory 1952. The pedestal reads "The Gift of Moses Brown Ives Goddard to Brown University."

In 2020, Brown's Public Art Committee proposed to restore the statue and relocate it to the Quiet Green, with the intention of putting it into conversation with the Slavery Memorial (since the statue is read to today as a white man, who during the Roman Empire maintained practices of enslavement). An ongoing student movement advocates to stop the relocation, and remove the statue entirely, encouraging Brown to spend its money acquiring new works of art by local Black and Indigenous artists.

=== Marcus Aurelius (1908) ===
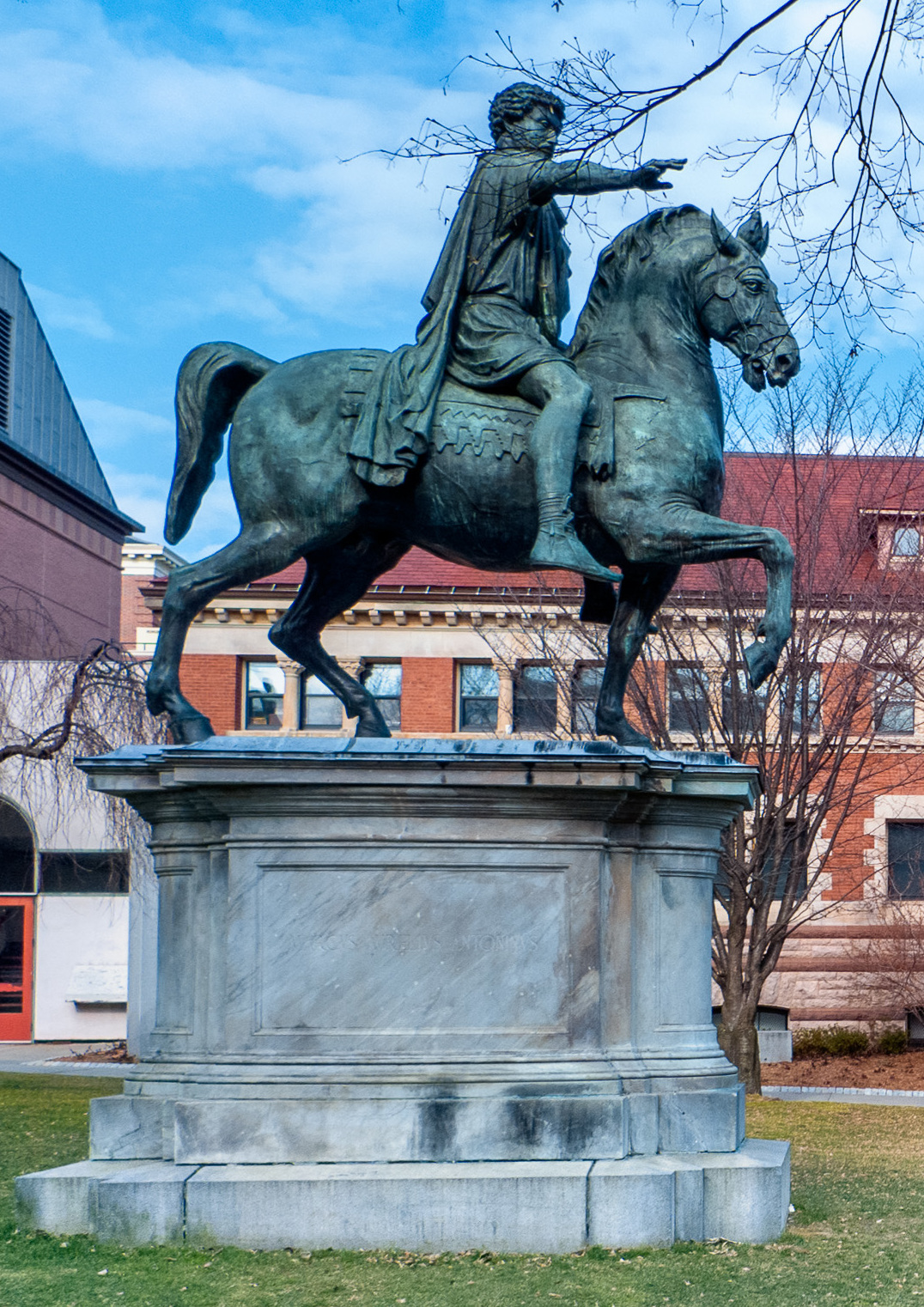
Marcus Aurelius

Brown's Marcus Aurelius statue stands atop of the hill on Ruth Simmons Quadrangle, at the rear of Sayles Hall, facing Thayer Street through the Soldiers Memorial Gate. The statue was unveiled on June 1, 1908, by Robert Hale Ives Goddard on behalf of his deceased brother Moses Brown Ives Goddard. The bronze statue is a copy of the equestrian statue located on Capitoline Hill in Rome. The northern pedestal's face is inscribed, "The Gift of Moses Brown Ives Goddard to Brown University MCMVII".

=== Bust of Dante Alighieri (1921) ===
A bust of Dante Alighieri stands in front of Brown's John Hay Library on a marble pedestal. The bust was created by Italian–born sculptor Paolo Abbate and unveiled on December 9, 1921.

=== Bronze Bruno (1927) ===
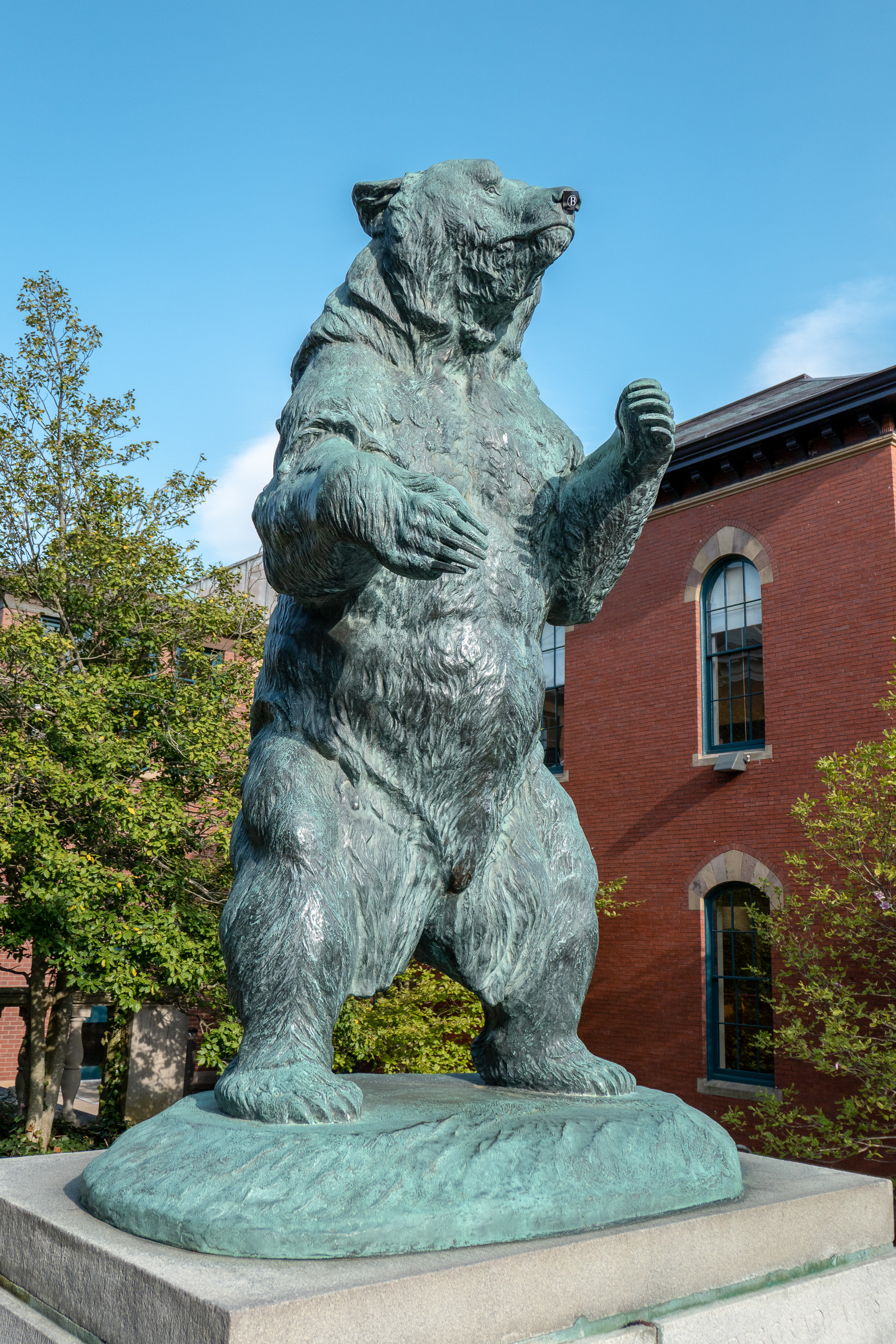
Bronze Bruno

The seven-foot Bronze Bruno statue was cast by the Gorham Manufacturing Company in 1923, paid for by $10,000 of donations from Brown alumni. The statue was not installed until 1927 because of a "debate ... about its meaning and proper placement." It was sculpted by New York City animalier Eli Harvey. The statue was originally located at Marvel Gymnasium, then moved to a prominent location on the main College Green (between Faunce House and Salomon Center) when the gym was shut down in 1989.

The front side of the pedestal reads:

Given By Alumni And Undergraduates
To Brown University
To Symbolize Those Qualities Of
Strength Courage Endurance
Which Go Far To Make Men Invincible
MCMXXVIII

The bear stands on a pedestal containing a piece of slate rock stepped upon by Roger Williams in 1636 when claiming the land that would become the city of Providence. On the back of the statue, below the slate, the pedestal is inscribed with:

This is a piece of the slate rock
on which Roger Williams Landed
when he came here in 1636
to hold forth his lively experiment
of independence with strength & courage.
May his spirit live in Brown men.

=== Little Bear Fountain (1937) ===
Little Bear Fountain

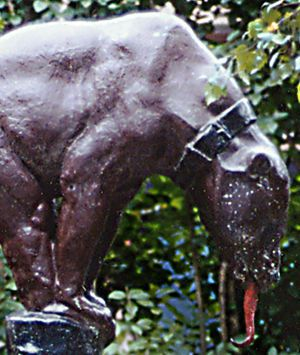
Before restoration

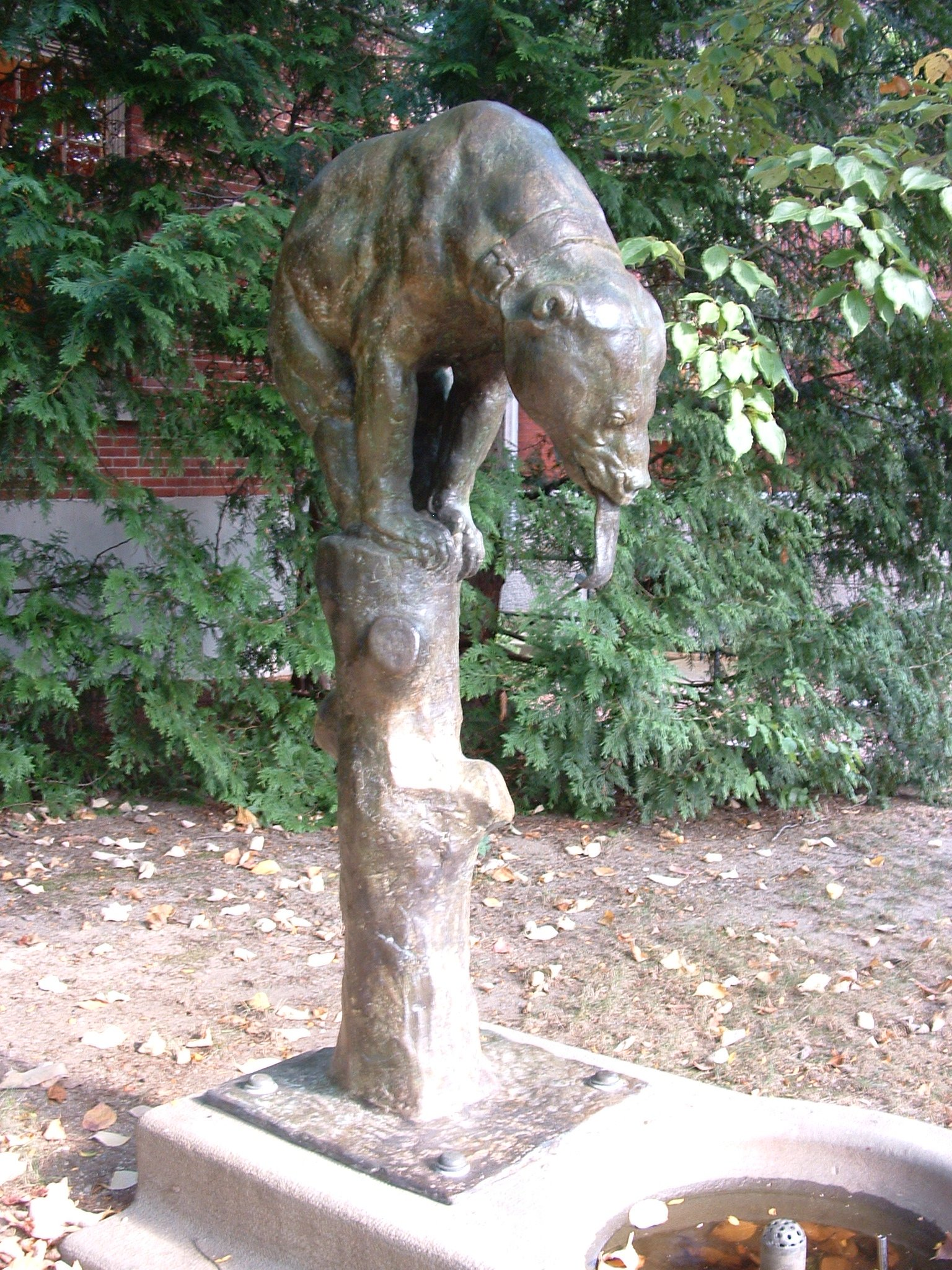
After restoration

Slightly out of the way from the main campus, the Little Bear Fountain currently resides next to Brown's Faculty Club. The fountain was a gift from Theodore Francis Green, who had promoted the bear as Brown's mascot; it is a bronze replica of one which Green found presiding over a fountain in Breslau, Poland. Over the years, the statue was painted with lacquer, masking much of the artistic detail of the bear. It was recently restored to its original condition by Newmans' Ltd. of Newport, Rhode Island.

== 1950–2000 ==
=== Reclining Figure No. 2 — Bridge Prop (1963) ===
Brown's Main Green features one of six editions of Henry Moore's Three-Piece Reclining Figure No. 2: Bridge Prop. The sculpture was given to the school by Laura and David Finn in 1974. Moore visited the campus in May 1974 to view the then-newly installed sculpture.

=== 1 1/2 (1976) ===
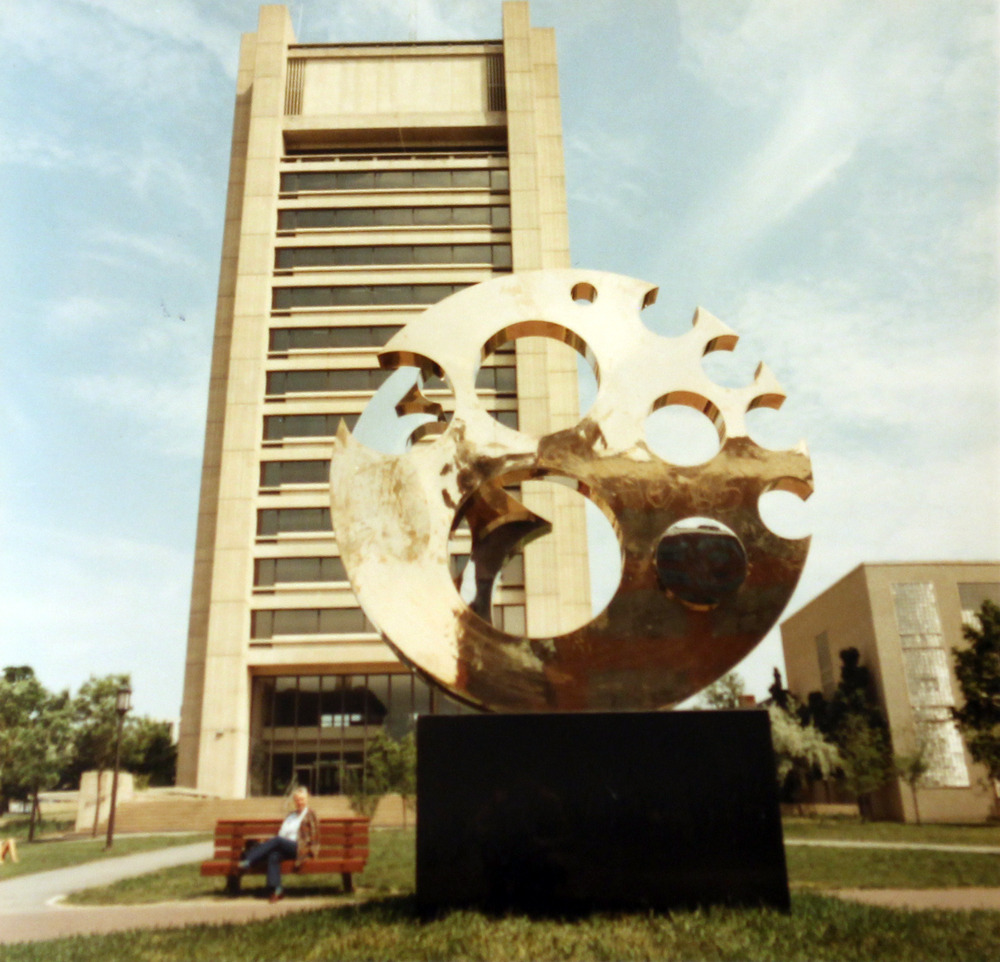
One and A Half - Brown University

1 1/2 is a bronze and stainless steel sculpture by Carla Lavatelli. The sculpture is installed at Sciences Park between MacMillan Hall and the Sciences Library.

=== Untitled (Swearer Bear, 1988) ===
This five foot six bear, which stands in the yard of Maddock Alumni Center, was sculpted by Nicholas Swearer, son of Brown President Howard Swearer. This statue doesn't depict a bear at all; if one looks closely in the mouth of the bear, it becomes apparent that the statue depicts a child wearing a bear suit.

=== America One (1990) ===
America One by Serbian sculptor Dušan Džamonja stands in front of the Thomas J. Watson Sr. Center for Information Technology. The sculpture was commissioned by Vice Chancellor Artemis Joukowsky and dedicated in 1990. Speaking of his choosing of Džamonja, Joukowsky said "I thought it would be wonderful to have an East European sculptor represented on campus... This could be regarded as a symbol of the growing political as well as artistic freedom in that part of the world.”

== 2000–present ==
=== Circle Dance (2010) ===
In 2012, Brown University accepted the anonymous donation of Circle Dance, a life-size sculpture by American sculptor Tom Friedman. The sculpture, modeled after Henri Matisse's painting La Danse, is constructed out of stainless steel recycled from aluminium pans, and lies along the public grassy area called The Walk.

=== Indomitable (2013) ===
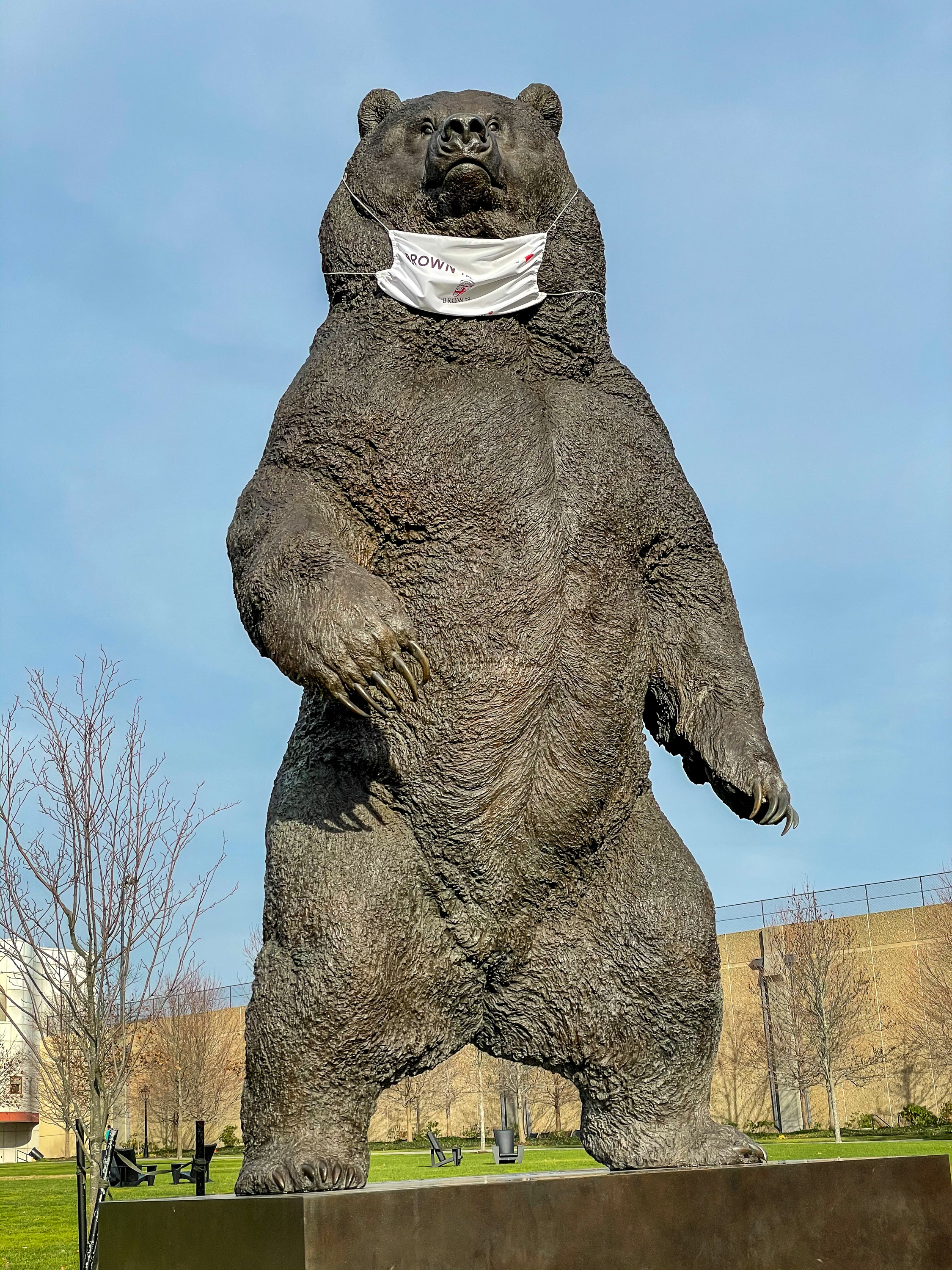
Indomitable wears a mask during the COVID-19 pandemic

Created by British wildlife sculptor Nick Bibby, Indomitable was erected in 2013 on the Ittleson Quad near the entrance of the Nelson Fitness Center. It was commissioned by Brown's Public Art Committee, which designates a percentage of construction budgets for public art displays. Additional support came from private donors.

At ten feet in height, Indomitable is true to size for a male Kodiak. Bibby drew inspiration from a quote by Theodore Francis Green, who in 1904 advocated the selection of a bear as Brown's mascot:

While it may be somewhat unsociable and uncouth, it is good natured and clean. While courageous and ready to fight, it does not look for trouble for its own sake, not is it bloodthirsty. It is not one of a herd, but acts independently. It is intelligent and capable of being educated (if caught young enough).

The statue took over eighteen months to complete, because of its high degree of detail.

=== Slavery Memorial (2014) ===
In September 2014, Brown dedicated Slavery Memorial on its Front Green. The memorial stands between Manning Hall and Carrie Tower. The commissioned work by noted African-American sculptor Martin Puryear memorializes Brown's 18th century connections to chattel slavery and the transatlantic slave trade. Constructed of ductile cast iron, the memorial takes the shape of a massive ball and chain.

=== Under the Laurentide (2014) ===
In 2015, Brown dedicated Under the Laurentide, a sculpture created by contemporary artist and designer Maya Lin. The statue stands on the quadrangle bounded by 85 Waterman Street and Arnold Laboratory. The sculpture takes the form of an oval water table similar to those Lin has created for Yale and Princeton. The table's granite surface is contoured to evoke the topography of Narragansett Bay. Thematically, the work addresses climate change, habitat loss and sea level rise.

== See also ==
- List of Brown University buildings
