= Corliss–Brackett House =

Historic house in Rhode Island, United States

- U.S. National Register of Historic Places
- U.S. National Historic Landmark District – Contributing property
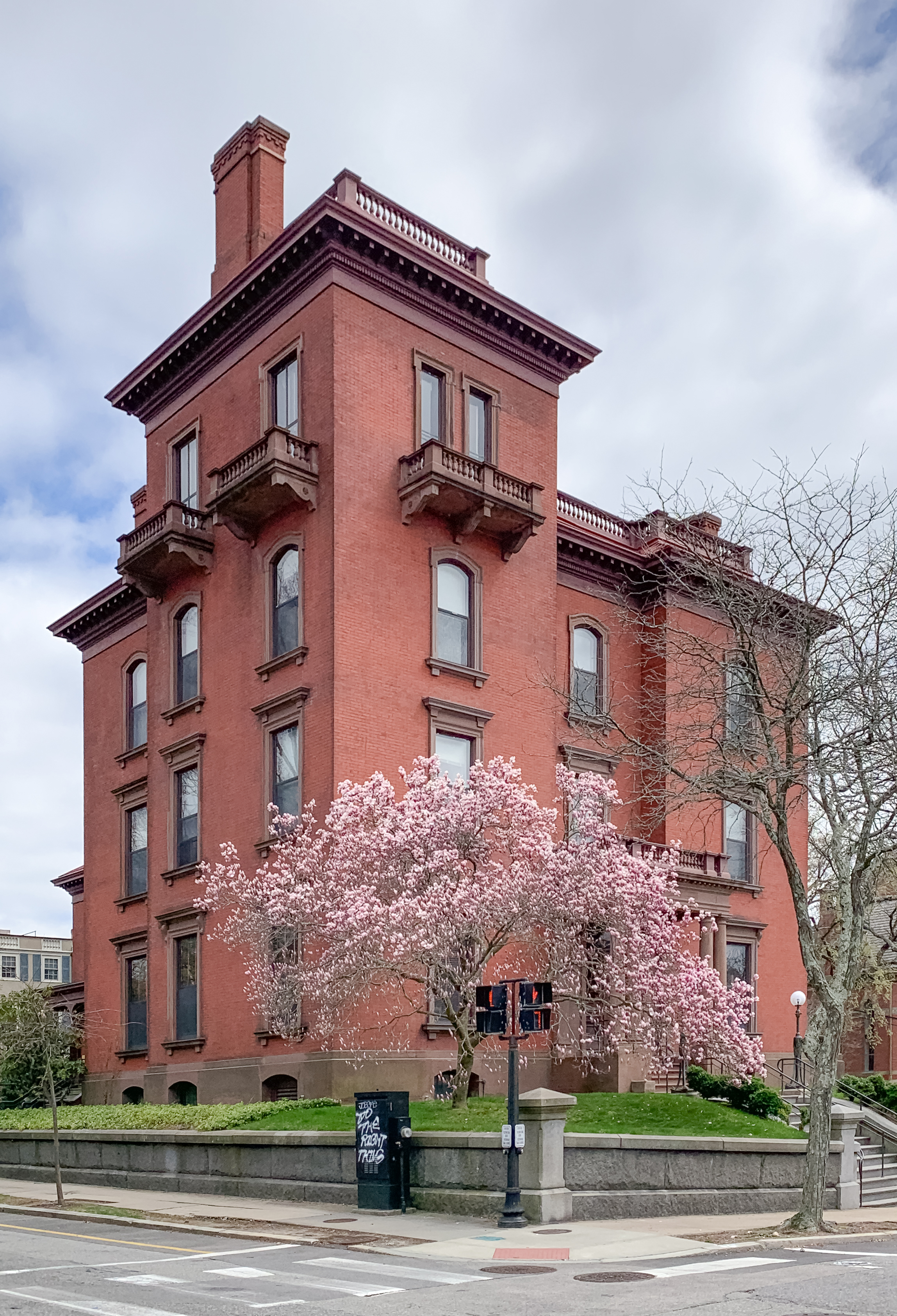

- Location within Rhode Island Location within the United States
- Location: 45 Prospect Street, Providence, Rhode Island
- Coordinates: 41°49′39″N 71°24′18″W
- Built: 1875
- Architectural style: Italian Villa
- Part of: College Hill Historic District (ID70000019)
- NRHP reference No.: 70000018

Significant dates
- Added to NRHP: April 3, 1970
- Designated NHLDCP: November 10, 1970

The Corliss–Brackett House, also known as the Charles Brackett House, is an historic house in the College Hill neighborhood of Providence, Rhode Island. The house is located at 45 Prospect Street at the southeast corner of Prospect and Angell Streets. According to Richard B. Harrington of the Rhode Island State Historical Preservation Commission, "There remain anywhere very few very formally and more monumentally treated durable masonry examples of the 'Italian (Tuscan) Villa style.'"

== Architecture ==
The house maintains its original exterior appearance. The structure stands three full stories above a low basement; a tower in the house's northwest corner stands a story taller. A two-story service wing to the house's east is separated at street level by a tunnel-like porte-cochère. The house is constructed in the Italian Villa style, which emerged in the United States in the 1840s; the structure is thus slightly retardataire.

== History ==
The house was built between 1875 and 1882 by George Henry Corliss, inventor of the Corliss Steam Engine. Corliss' second wife, Emily Shaw, suffered from an illness for which a doctor recommended she spend her winters in Bermuda. Corliss sought to fulfill the prescription locally by "bringing" the temperate climate of Bermuda to Providence. To this end, he constructed a radiantly heated house, potentially the first in America to employ a radiant heating system controlled by a thermostat. Other unconventional technologies Corliss integrated into the structure include a hydraulic elevator and concealed insect screens.

The house was inherited by screenwriter and relative of Corliss, Charles Brackett in 1929. Brackett donated the structure to Brown University in 1955. It was added to the National Register of Historic Places in 1970. From 1973 to 2013, the house served as the Admission Office for Brown. It is currently occupied by the Brown University Department of Philosophy.

The exterior of its carriage house was used on the television series Doctor Doctor to represent Dr. Stratford's office.

== Gallery ==
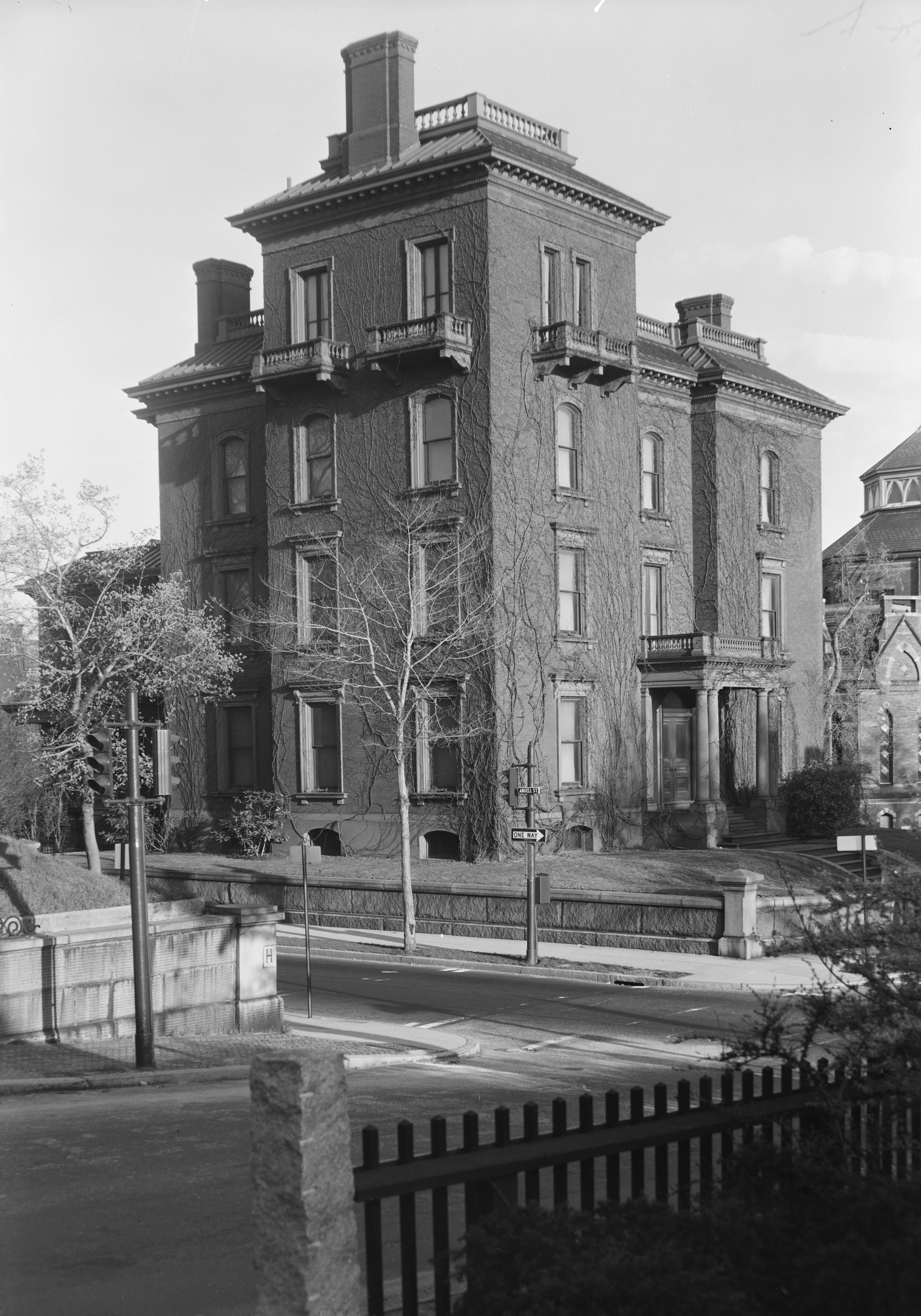
The house in May 1958

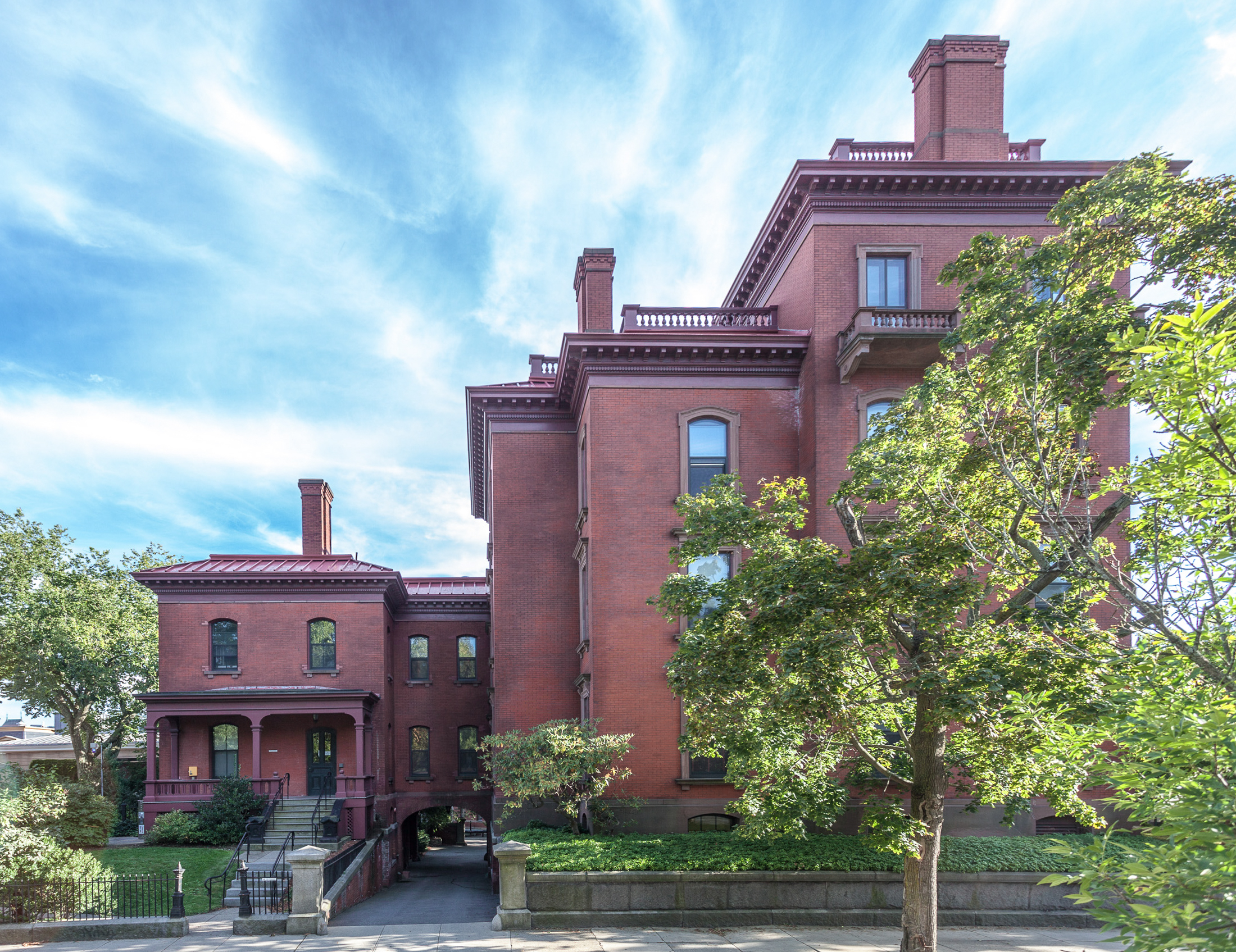
Angell Street side (North side)

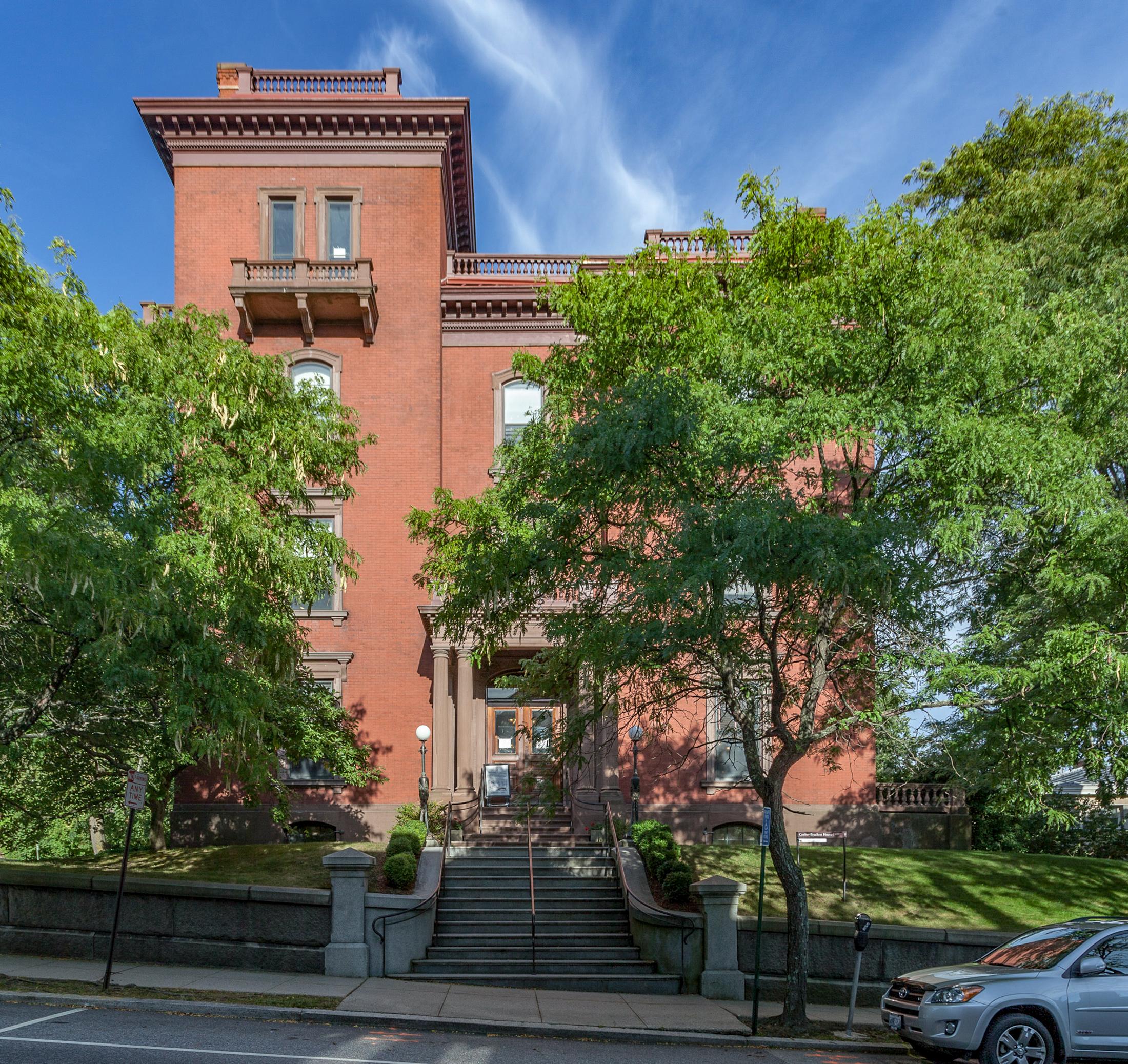
The house from Prospect Street

== See also ==
- National Register of Historic Places listings in Providence, Rhode Island
