= Joseph Haile House =

Historic house in Rhode Island, United States

- U.S. National Register of Historic Places
- U.S. National Historic Landmark District – Contributing property
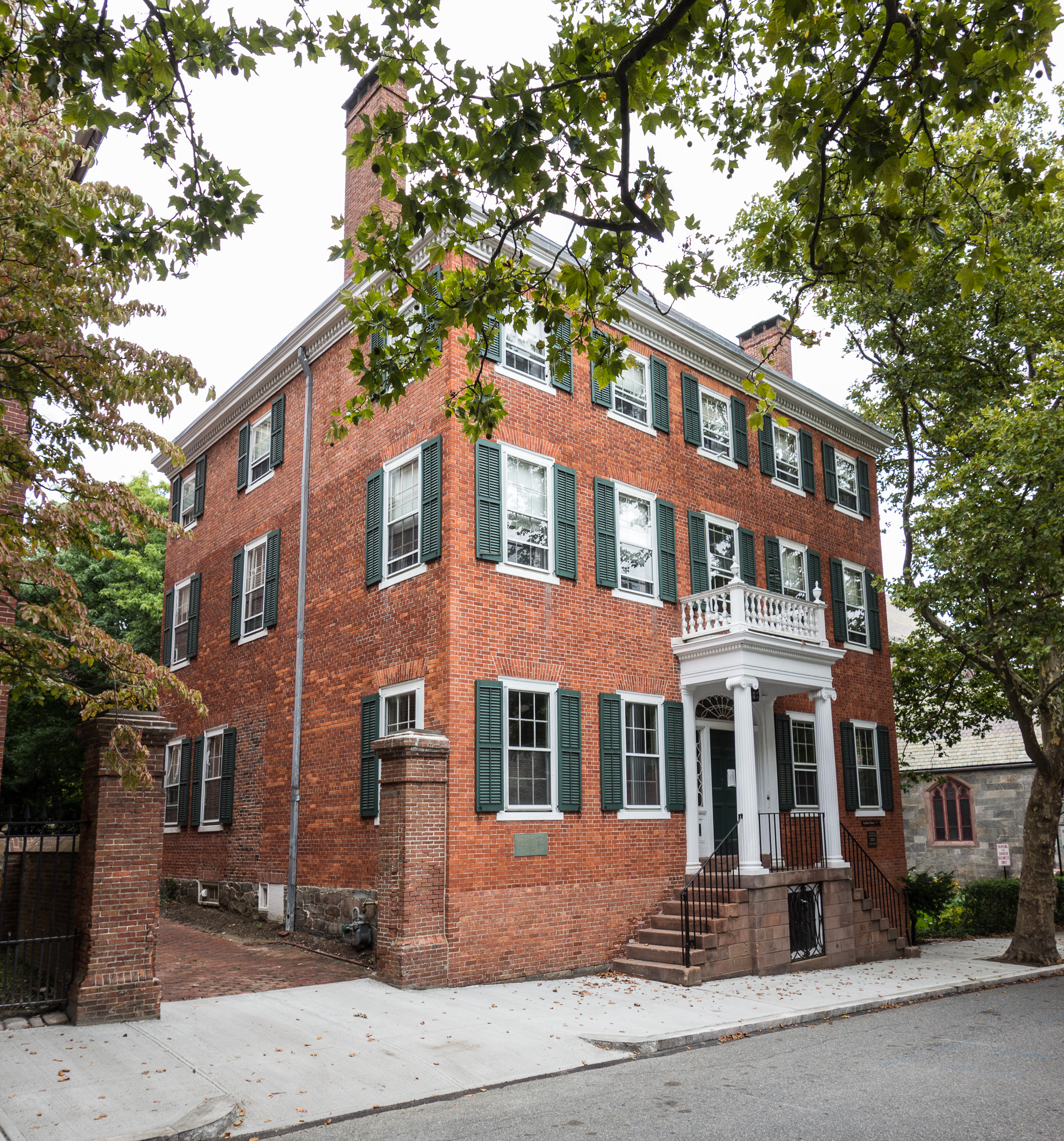
- Joseph Haile House in 2013

- Location within Rhode Island Location within the United States
- Location: 106 George Street, Providence, Rhode Island
- Coordinates: 41°49′32″N 71°24′10″W
- Built: 1806
- Architectural style: Federal
- Part of: College Hill Historic District (ID70000019)
- NRHP reference No.: 72000007

Significant dates
- Added to NRHP: May 19, 1972
- Designated NHLDCP: November 10, 1970

The Joseph Haile House (or Gardner House) is an historic house in the College Hill neighborhood of Providence, Rhode Island. It is a 3 1/2-story brick structure, appearing taller than that due to its hillside location and raised basement. It is a well-preserved example of Federal styling, which underwent a careful restoration in the 1930s by George Warren Gardner, who filled the house with early American furniture. The Gardners bequested the property to Brown University, which uses it to house visiting dignitaries.

The house was listed on the National Register of Historic Places in 1972.

== See also ==
- National Register of Historic Places listings in Providence, Rhode Island
