= TenBerke =

Interior design firm

TenBerke (formerly Deborah Berke Partners)

Practice information
- Firm type: Architectural Practice
- Partners: Deborah Berke, Noah Biklen, Stephen Brockman, Kiki Dennis, Ameet Hiremath, Maitland Jones, Rhoda Kennedy, Arthi Krishnamoorthy, Marc Leff, Terrence Schroeder, Caroline Wharton, Aaron Plewke, Damaris Arias
- Founded: 1982
- Location: New York City

Website
- Official website

TenBerke (formerly Deborah Berke Partners) is a New York City, based architecture and interior design firm founded and led by Deborah Berke, who concurrently serves as Dean of the Yale School of Architecture.

== Projects ==
=== Completed Projects ===
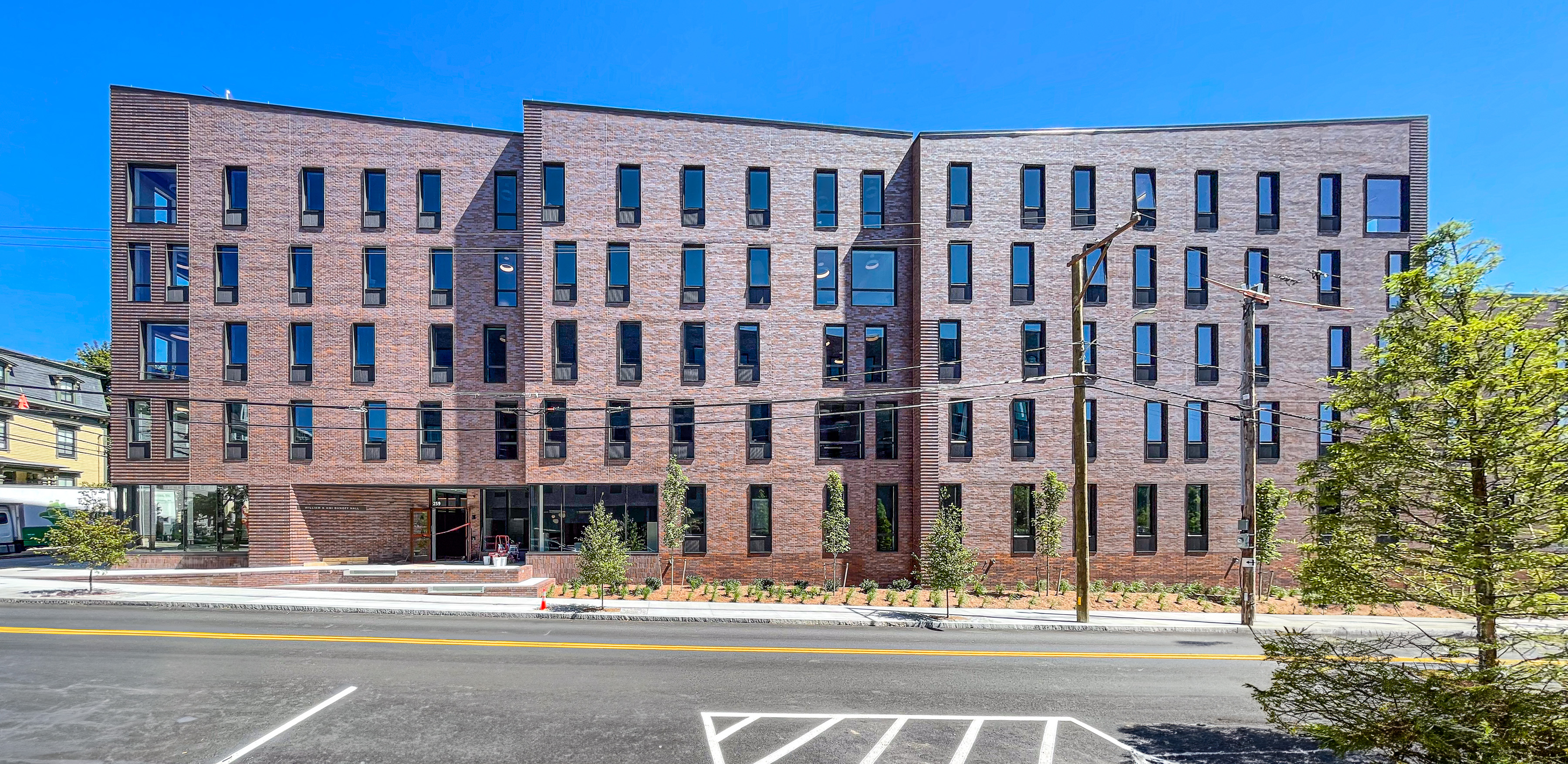
Residence Hall at Brown University (2023)

- Residence Halls, Brown University, 2023
- Princeton University Residential Colleges, Princeton, New Jersey, United States, 2022
- University of Pennsylvania Meeting and Guest House, Philadelphia, Pennsylvania, United States, 2021
- Lewis International Law Center, Harvard Law School, Cambridge, Massachusetts, United States, 2021
- NXTHVN, New Haven, Connecticut, United States, 2021
- 77 Greenwich, New York City, New York, United States, 2022
- Manhattan Townhouse, New York City, New York, United States, 2021
- Bayside House, Long Island, New York, United States, 2020
- 40 East End Avenue, New York City, New York, United States, 2020
- 21c Museum Hotel, Chicago, Illinois, United States, 2020
- 122 Community Arts Center, New York City, New York, United States, 2018
- 21c Museum Hotel, Kansas City, Missouri, United States 2018
- Dickinson College Residence Hall, Carlisle, Pennsylvania, United States, 2018
- Park Ave Office, New York City, New York, United States, 2018
- Cummins Indy Distribution Headquarters, Indianapolis, Indianapolis, United States, 2017
- Fifth Avenue Duplex Apartment, New York City, New York, United States, 2017
- Rockefeller Arts Center, SUNY Fredonia, Fredonia, New York, United States, 2017
- Richardson Olmsted Campus, Buffalo, New York, United States, 2017
- 21c Museum Hotel, Oklahoma City, Oklahoma, United States, 2016
- North Penn House, Indianapolis, Indiana, United States, 2016
- Sacket Hill House, Warren, Connecticut, United States, 2016
- 21c Museum Hotel, Durham, North Carolina, United States, 2015
- 432 Park Avenue Interiors, New York City, New York, United States, 2015
- 48 Bond Street, New York City, New York, United States, 2008
- Marianne Boesky Gallery, New York City, New York, United States, 2007
- Irwin Union Bank, Columbus, Indiana, United States, 2006
- Yale University School of Art, New Haven, Connecticut, United States, 2000

=== Under Construction ===
- University of Virginia Hotel and Conference Center, Charlottesville, Virginia, United States

== Awards ==
- 2023 AD100 Hall of Fame, Architectural Digest
- 2023 Merit Award, Princeton University Residential Colleges, AIANY Design Awards
- 2023 Merit Award, University of Pennsylvania Meeting and Guesthouse, AIANYS Design Awards
- 2022 Winner, Deborah Berke, AIA/ACSA Topaz Medallion for Architectural Education
- 2022 AD100, Architectural Digest
- 2022 A-List Titan, Elle Décor
- 2022 Architecture Award, Richardson Olmsted Complex, AIA
- 2022 Interior Architecture Award, Richardson Olmsted Complex, AIA
- 2022 Editors Awards, Light and Shadow Collection, Warp and Weft, ICFF
- 2022 Top 50 Architects and Designers of 2022, AN Interior
- 2022, Top 50 Coastal Architects of 2022, Ocean Homes
- 2021 AD100, Architectural Digest
- 2021 Honoree, Greater Good: Social + Environment Impact - The Wallace Foundation, NYCxDesign
- 2021 A-List Titan, Elle Décor
- 2021 Top 50 Architects of 2021, AN Interior
- 2021 Honor Award, University of Pennsylvania Meeting and Guesthouse, SARA NY
- 2021 Excellence Award, University of Pennsylvania Meeting and Guesthouse, SARA National
- 2021 Editor's Pick in the Institutional, Higher Education Category, University of Pennsylvania Meeting and Guesthouse, AN Best of Design Awards
- 2021 Winner of the Adaptive Reuse Category, NXTHVN, AN Best of Design Awards
- 2021 Runner-Up for Best Project of the Year, NXTHVN, AN Best of Design Awards
- 2021 Honoree, University of Pennsylvania Meeting and Guesthouse, Interior Design Magazine Best of Year Award
- 2021 Top 50 Coastal Architects of 2021, Ocean Home
- 2020 AD100, Architectural Digest
- 2020 Honor Award, Richardson Olmsted Campus, AIANY
- 2019 Honor Award, 122 Community Arts Center, SARA NY
- 2019 Citation for Design, Richardson Olmsted Campus, AIANYS
- 2019 Citation for Design, Dickinson College Residence Hall, AIANYS
- 2018 AD100, Architectural Digest
- 2018 Design Award of Honor, North Penn House, SARA National
- 2018 Design Award of Honor, NXTHVN, SARA New York Council
- 2018 The American Architecture Award, Cummins Indy Distribution Headquarters, The Chicago Athenaeum Museum of Architecture and Design
- 2018 The American Architecture Award, Rockefeller Arts Center, SUNY Fredonia, The Chicago Athenaeum Museum of Architecture and Design
- 2017 AD100, Architectural Digest
- 2017 National Design Award, Cooper Hewitt, Smithsonian Design Museum
- 2017 Best of Year, Hotel Henry at the Richardson Olmsted Campus, Interior Design Magazine
- 2017 Best of Year, West Chelsea Apartment, Interior Design Magazine
- 2017 Design Award of Excellence, Cummins Indy Distribution Headquarters, SARA National
- 2016 AD100, Architectural Digest
- 2016 Best of the Year Award, Finalist, 21c Museum Hotel Oklahoma City, Interior Design Magazine
- 2015 Best of Year Award, Hotel Renewal, 21c Museum Hotel Durham, Interior Design Magazine
- 2014 Good Design is Good Business, 21c Museum Hotels and TenBerke Collaboration, Architectural Record

== Publications ==
- Transform: Promising Places, Second Chances, and the Architecture of Transformational Change, Deborah Berke and Thomas de Monchaux, Monacelli, 2023
- Against Historic Preservation: Transforming Old Buildings for New (Sustainable) Features, in the Journal of Architectural Education, Volume 72m Issue 2, 2018 article.
- House Rules, Rizzoli, 2016
- Deborah Berke, Yale University Press – 2008
