= Marvel Gymnasium =

Gymnasium in Providence, Rhode Island

Coordinates: 41.842775°N 71.391671°W

Frederick W. Marvel Gymnasium
- Interactive map of Frederick W. Marvel Gymnasium
- Former names: Brown Gymnasium, 1927-38
- Location: Elmgrove Ave; Providence, RI 02906
- Owner: Brown University
- Operator: Brown University
- Capacity: 3,000

Construction
- Groundbreaking: 1927
- Opened: December 16, 1927
- Closed: 1989
- Demolished: 2002
- Architect: Clarke & Howe

Tenants
- Brown University Bears (Basketball, squash, wrestling & fencing)

Marvel Gymnasium was a 3,000-seat multipurpose gymnasium in Providence, Rhode Island. It was home to the Brown University Bears basketball team as well as other teams. The gymnasium included a basketball court and seating, a second-floor running track, squash and handball courts, a wrestling room, a boxing room, and a fencing room.

== Description ==
The building was located at Aldrich Field, located on Elmgrove Avenue across from Brown Stadium. The land for Aldrich Field was a gift to the University from brothers Charles and Henry Aldrich, both alumni of Brown. The façade's clock face read "A-L-D-R-I-C-H-F-I-E-L-D" instead of the regular numbers, with the "R" being in place of the 12. The bronze statue of "Bruno," the Brown bear mascot, was located just to the south of the main entrance on a pedestal containing a piece of slate said to have been from the spot where Roger Williams landed in what would become Providence in 1636. After Marvel Gym was closed, the statue was moved to the College Green, where it originally stood.

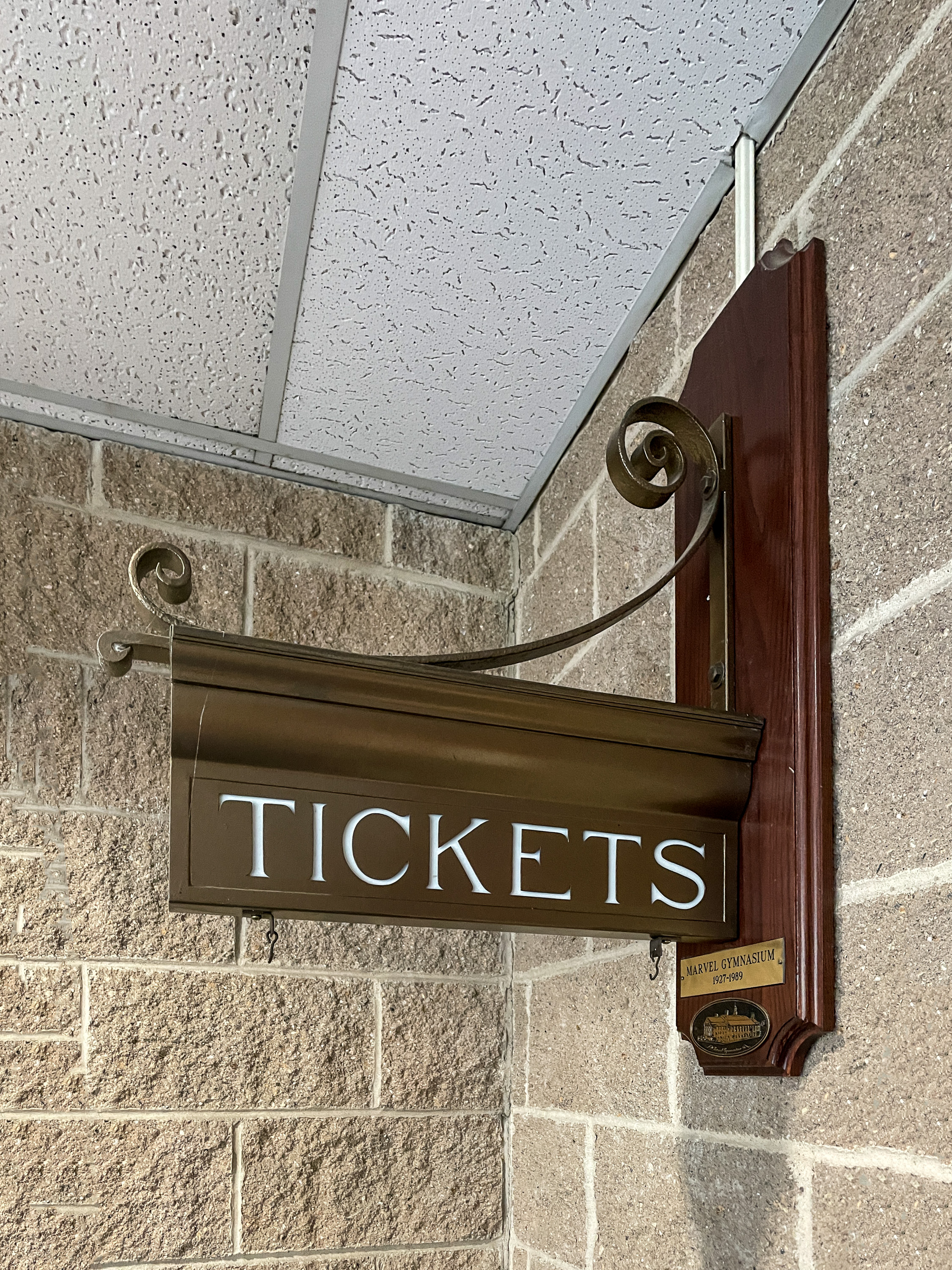
This TICKETS sign was salvaged from Marvel Gymnasium and installed at the ticket booth in Pizzitola Center.

On October 7, 1938, the building was rededicated to the memory of Frederick W. "Doc" Marvel, class of 1896, a longtime athletic director. The building was in use until 1989, when the Pizzitola Sports Center opened at the Brown Athletic Conference. It was then closed and stood dormant until 2002, when it was demolished, well past its usefulness and becoming dangerously dilapidated. There are now practice fields on the site. The building's cupola, mounted above a replica of the Aldrich Field clock, is now part of Brown's Nelson Fitness Center, which opened in May 2012.
