= Slater family =

American family

Slater
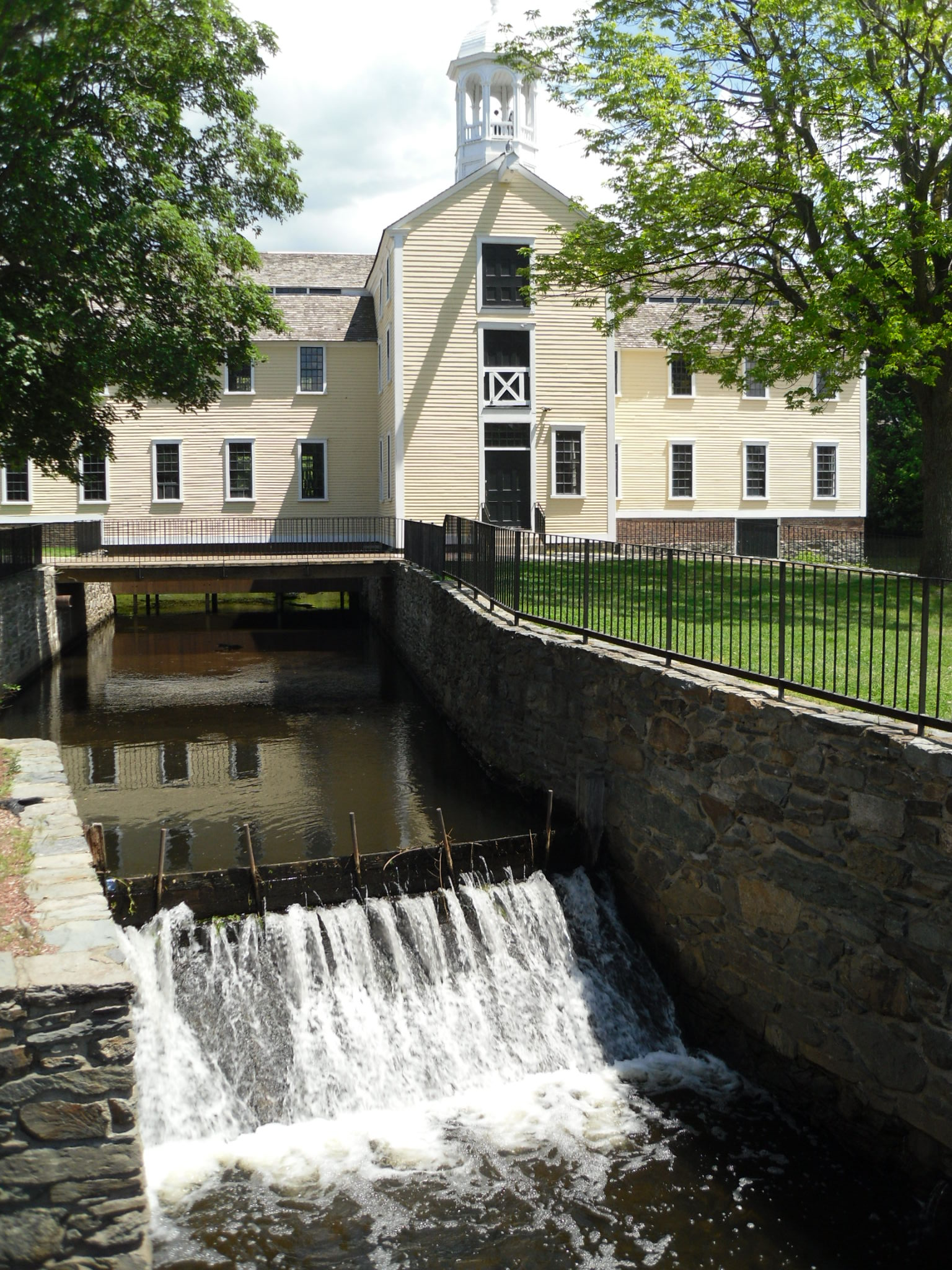
- Slater Mill (1790), the first textile mill in America.
- Current region: Rhode Island, U.S. Connecticut, U.S. Massachusetts, U.S.
- Origin: United States and Britain

The Slater family is an American philanthropic, political, and manufacturing family from England, Rhode Island, Massachusetts, and Connecticut whose members include the "Father of the American Industrial Revolution," Samuel Slater, a prominent textile tycoon who founded America's first textile mill, Slater Mill (1790), and with his brother John Slater founded Slatersville, Rhode Island in North Smithfield, Rhode Island in 1803, America's first planned mill village. The family includes various merchants, inventors, art patrons, and socialites. John Fox Slater, was a prominent abolitionist who founded the Slater Fund and built the historic John F. Slater House and Slater Library. William A. Slater was a noted art collector and philanthropist who created the Slater Memorial Museum in Connecticut. After moving many of their mills to the South from New England, the village of Slater-Marietta, South Carolina was named after the family.

== Family members ==
William Slater (1728–1782) & Elizabeth Slater, farmers in the UK

- Samuel Slater (1768–1835), (founder of Slater Mill) married Hannah Slater (Wilkinson) (1774–1812) (first woman to receive a patent in the U.S.)
  - John Slater (1805–1837), first representative of the town of Webster, Massachusetts in the Massachusetts General Court
    - Horatio Nelson Slater Jr. (1835–1899), mill owner in Webster; married Elizabeth Vinton (granddaughter of David Vinton).
      - Horatio Nelson Slater III (1892–1968) founder Slater-Marietta, South Carolina, where he moved mill operations from Massachusetts
      - Martha B.L. Slater (1900-1977), former chairman of the women's division of the National Heart Association.
        - Denniston Lyon Slater (1927-1971), head of Fanny Farmer Candies
        - Alexander Byers Slater (1930-2007), acquirer of Fanny Farmer Candies
  - George Slater (1804–1843), one of the first selectman of Webster, Massachusetts
  - Horatio Nelson Slater (1808–1888), owner of mills in Webster, Massachusetts
- John Slater (1776–1843), co-founder of Slatersville, Rhode Island
  - John Fox Slater (1815–1885), abolitionist, philanthropist to African American causes
    - William A. Slater (1857–1919), art patron, donor of the Slater Memorial Museum at Norwich Free Academy
      - William A. Slater Jr., businessman
      - Eleanor Halsley (Slater) Malone, New York and Washington DC socialite
        - Adrian Halsey Malone (1915–2006), architect, designed Buffalo Bill Center of the West in Cody and the Bradford Brinton Museum
- William Slater
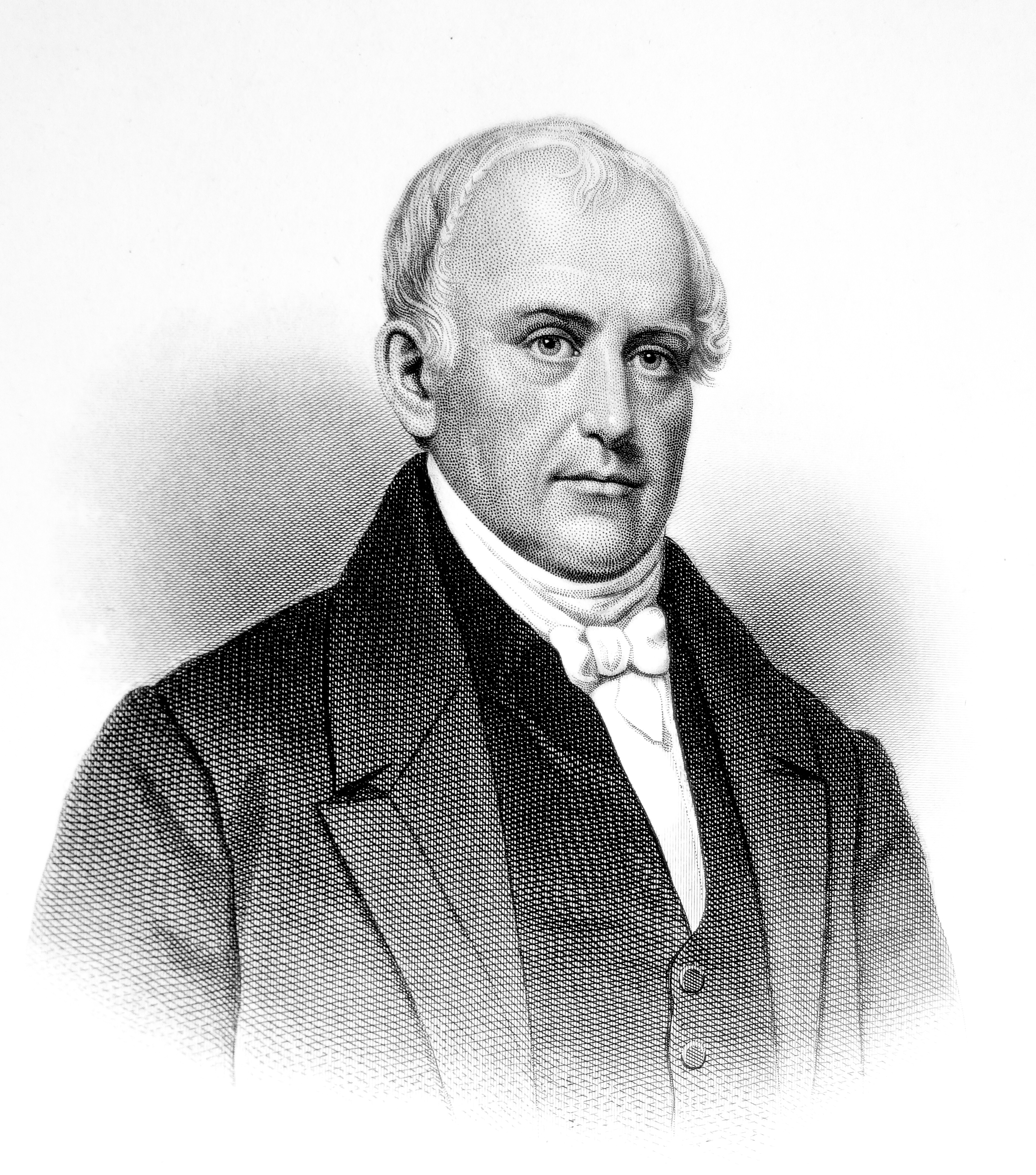
Samuel Slater, "Father of the American Industrial Revolution"

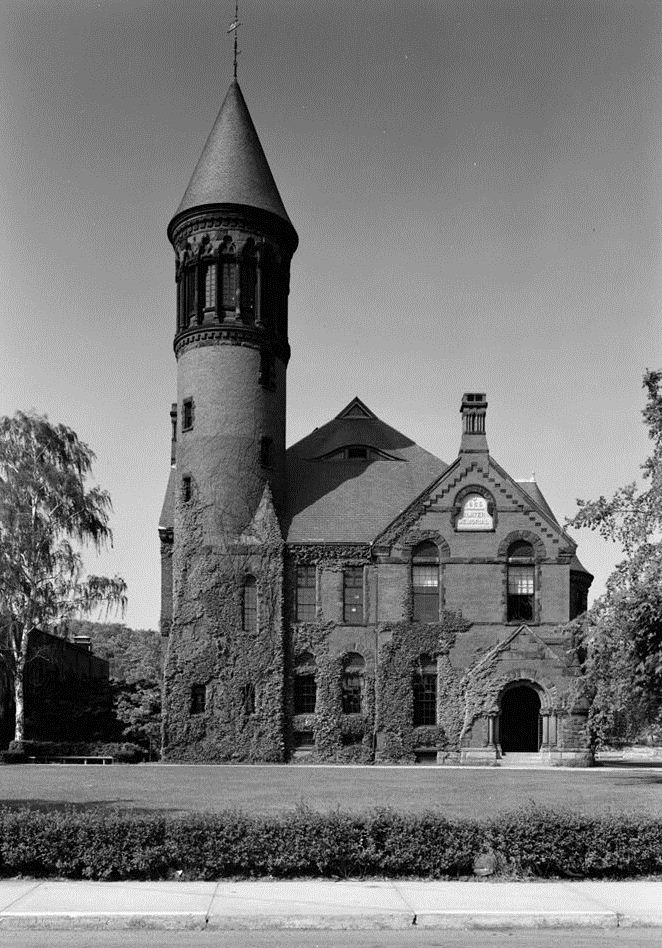
Slater Memorial Museum in Connecticut

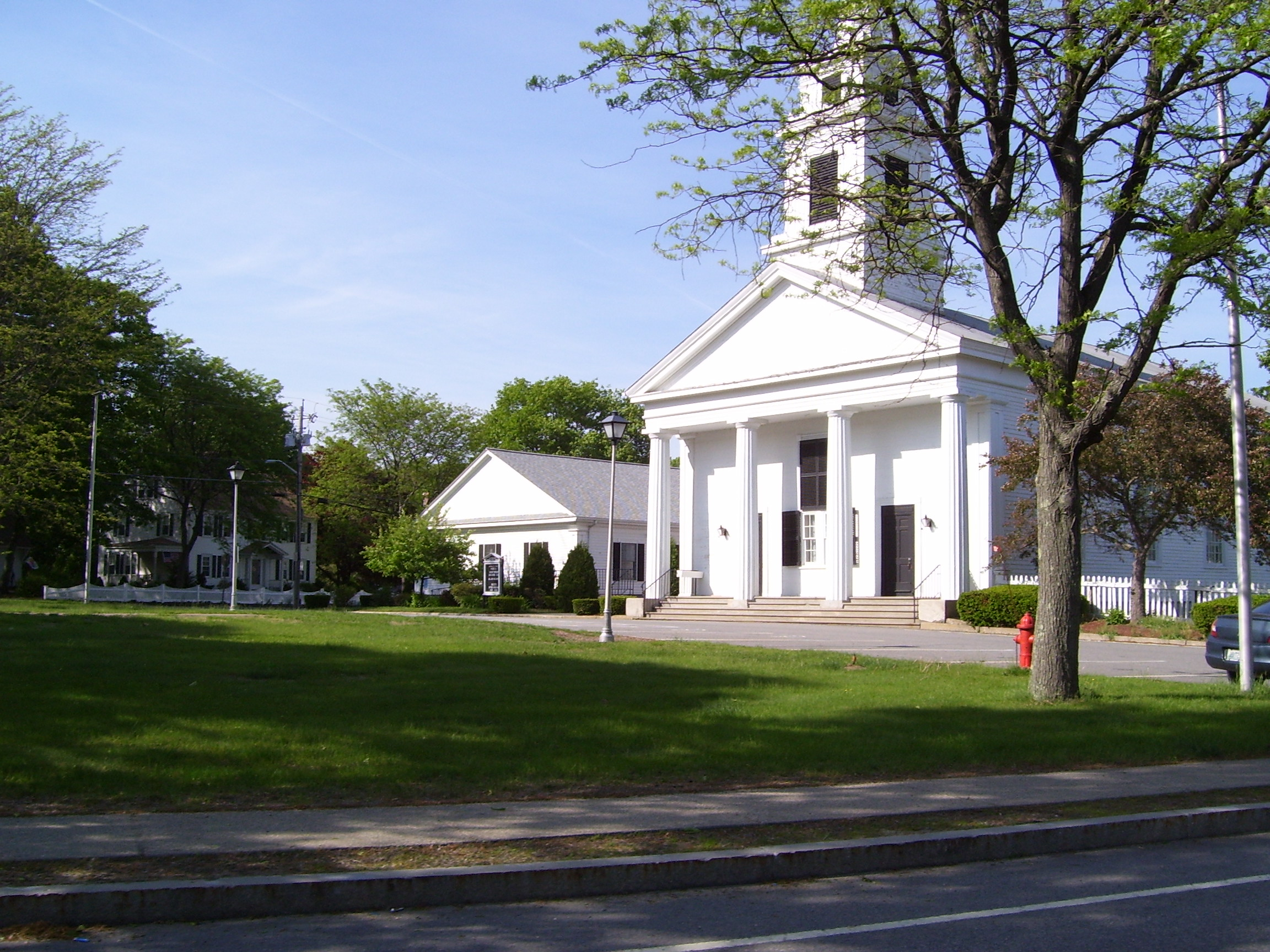
Slatersville Green in Rhode Island and the Congregational Church meeting house which the Slaters constructed and attended

John Fox Slater, abolitionist

John and Ruth Slater

== See also ==
- Slater Park
- Slater Park Zoo

=== Further reading ===
- Slatersville, Rhode Island History
- Barbara M. Tucker, Samuel Slater and the origins of the American textile industry: 1984
- George Savage White, Memoir of Samuel Slater: the father of American manufactures 1836
- Slater Family Records at Harvard Business School
