= William A. Slater =

American businessman, art collector, and philanthropist

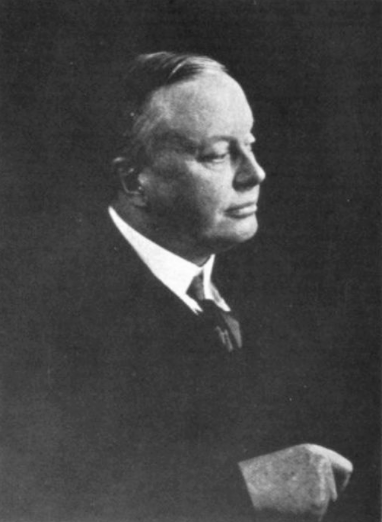
- Born: William Albert Slater; December 25, 1857; Norwich, Connecticut
- Died: February 25, 1919 (aged 61); Washington, D.C.
- Education: Norwich Free Academy; Harvard College
- Occupation: Businessman
- Spouse: Ellen Burdett Peck (m. 1885)
- Children: 2

William Albert Slater (1857–1919), was an American businessman, art collector, and philanthropist from Connecticut who was a member of the prominent Slater family.

== Early life ==
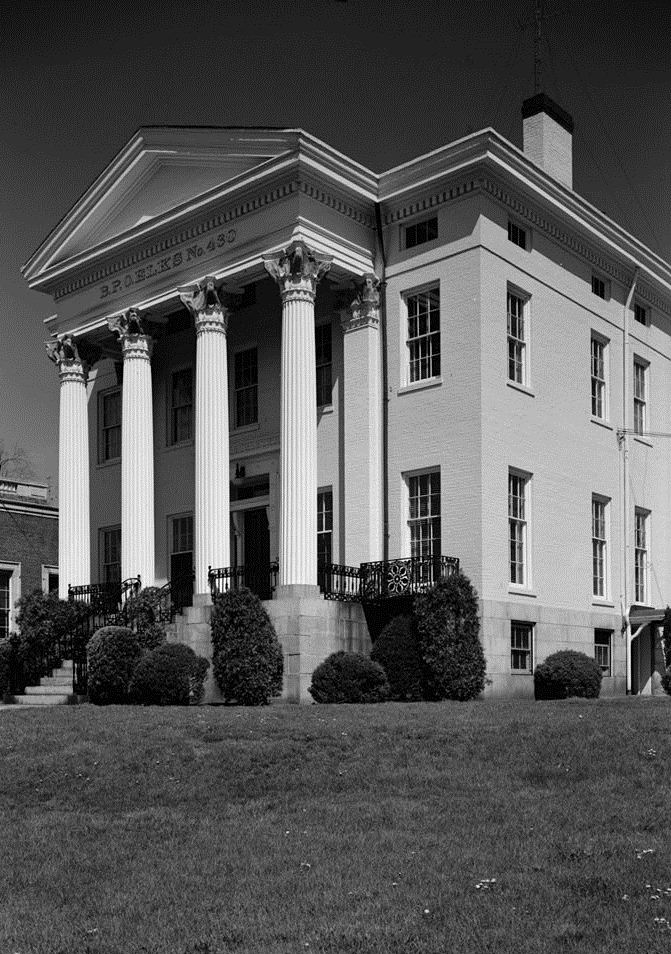
John Fox Slater House where William Slater grew up

Slater was born in Norwich, Connecticut, on December 25, 1857. He was the son of John Fox Slater and grandson of John Slater (Samuel Slater's brother and partner).

He was educated at Norwich Free Academy, then studied abroad, and later graduated from Harvard College in 1881. He studied art history under Charles Eliot Norton, and after graduating, Slater went on to acquire a notable art collection, including works by Rembrandt, and eventually began lending his paintings to the Slater Museum.

== Career ==
Slater worked in the family's textile business, the Slatersville Mills and Jewett City Mills.

He also served as a trustee of the Slater Fund. In 1886, Slater presented the Slater Memorial Museum to Norwich Free Academy in memory of his father. He also constructed Norwich's "Broadway Theater" and sponsored various shows there.

== Personal life ==
On June 11, 1885, Slater married Ellen Burdett Peck (1858–1941), a daughter of Frederic Mathew Peck and Ellen Louise (née Young) Peck. Together, they were the parents of two children:

- Eleanor Halsey Slater (1888–1928), who married Baron Boris de Struve, an attaché of the Russian Embassy in Washington, D.C. and son of Baron Karl de Struve, in 1909. After his death in 1912, she married A. Halsey Malone in 1914.
- William Albert Slater, Jr. (1890–1962), who married Madeleine Allen of New York. They divorced in 1920, and he married Frances Worthington Ames, a daughter of architect Worthington Ames of Ames & Dodge, in 1929.

In 1894, the Slaters and their two young children, William and Eleanor, travelled around the world in their 232-foot yacht, the Eleanor, named after their daughter. It had been constructed at Bath Iron Works in 1893–1894. Slater had an office in Boston, Massachusetts, and was a member of the Somerset Club and Tavern Club. In 1900 Slater sold the village of Slatersville, Rhode Island and the mill within it to James Hooper.

Slater died in Washington, D.C., on February 25, 1919. He was survived by his wife Ellen and two children. After his death, Slater's family sold the remaining Jewett City Mills.

== See also ==
- John Slater (industrialist)
