= John Fox Slater =

John Fox Slater

John Fox Slater (March 4, 1815 – May 7, 1884) was an American philanthropist who supported and funded the education of freedmen after the Civil War.

== Early life and career ==
Slater, the son of John Slater (Samuel Slater's brother and partner), was born in Slatersville, Rhode Island (now a village within North Smithfield) in 1815 where his family was active in Slatersville Congregational Church and owned the local textile mills and village. John F. Slater was educated in academies at Plainfield, Connecticut, and Wrentham and Wilbraham, Massachusetts. At seventeen he entered his father's woollen mill in Hopeville, Conn., of which he took charge in 1836. This and other mills he owned in partnership with his brother, William S Slater, until 1873, when his brother took over the Slatersville Mills and he assumed sole ownership of the mills at Jewett City. In 1842 he removed from Jewett City to Norwich; there he helped to endow the Norwich Free Academy, to which his son presented the Slater Memorial Museum. Slater also endowed Park Congregational Church in Norwich and donated Slater Library. Slater died on May 7, 1884, and his funeral was held at Park Congregational Church, which he had attended.

== Philanthropy ==
In 1882 he donated $1,000,000 to a board of ten trustees, incorporated in New York state, for the uplifting of the lately emancipated population of the Southern states, and their posterity, by conferring on them the benefits of Christian education. Among the original trustees of the Slater Fund were Rutherford B Hayes, Morrison R Waite, William E Dodge, Phillips Brooks, Daniel Coit Gilman, Morris Ketchum Jesup and the donor's son, William A. Slater; and among members chosen later were Melville W Fuller, William E Dodge, Jr, Henry Codman Potter, Cleveland H Dodge and Seth Low. In 1909 by careful investment the fund had increased, in spite of expenditures, to more than $1,500,000.

The fund was of great value in aiding industrial schools in the South, its largest beneficiaries being the Hampton Normal and Agricultural Institute of Hampton, Virginia, the Tuskegee Normal and Industrial Institute of Tuskegee, Alabama, Spelman Seminary in Atlanta, Claflin University in Orangeburg, South Carolina, and Fisk University, in Nashville, Tennessee. At Winston-Salem, North Carolina, is the Slater State Normal and Industrial School, founded in 1892 and named after the founder of the fund; it is now part of Winston-Salem State University. Other state normal schools for African Americans received assistance from the fund, as did some Southern urban school boards.

== Other ==
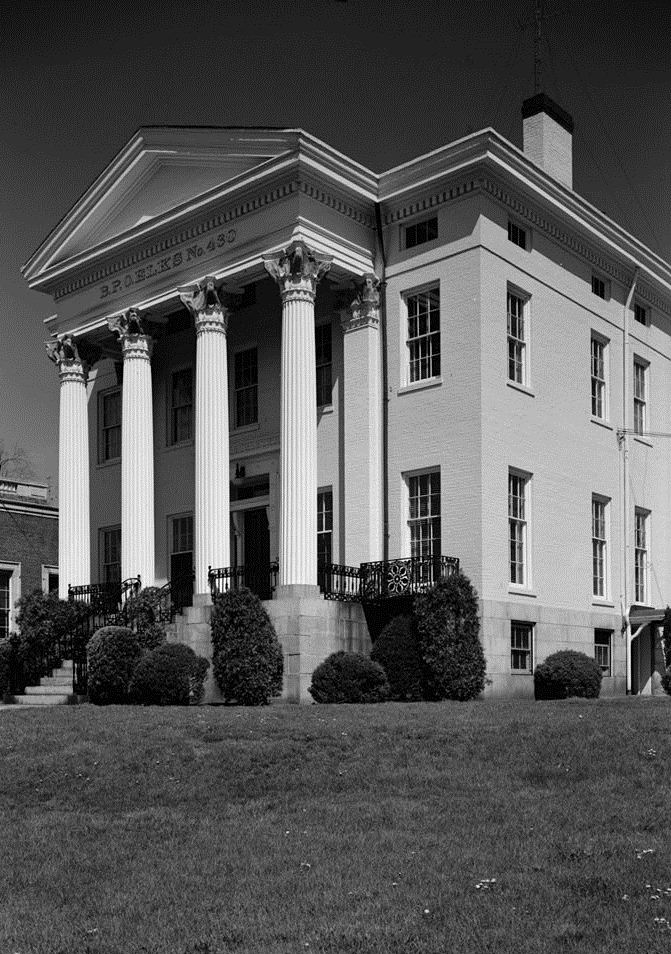
John Fox Slater House

As well as the Slater Memorial Museum, the John Fox Slater House in Norwich, Connecticut is another legacy. The John Fox Slater Elementary School in Washington, D.C., now closed, was named in his honor. The building is now listed on the National Register of Historic Places.

Slater High School in Bristol, Tennessee, was a segregated school that closed in 1865.

== See also ==
- John Slater (industrialist)
