= Cudworth & Woodworth =

American Architectural firm from Norwich, Connecticut

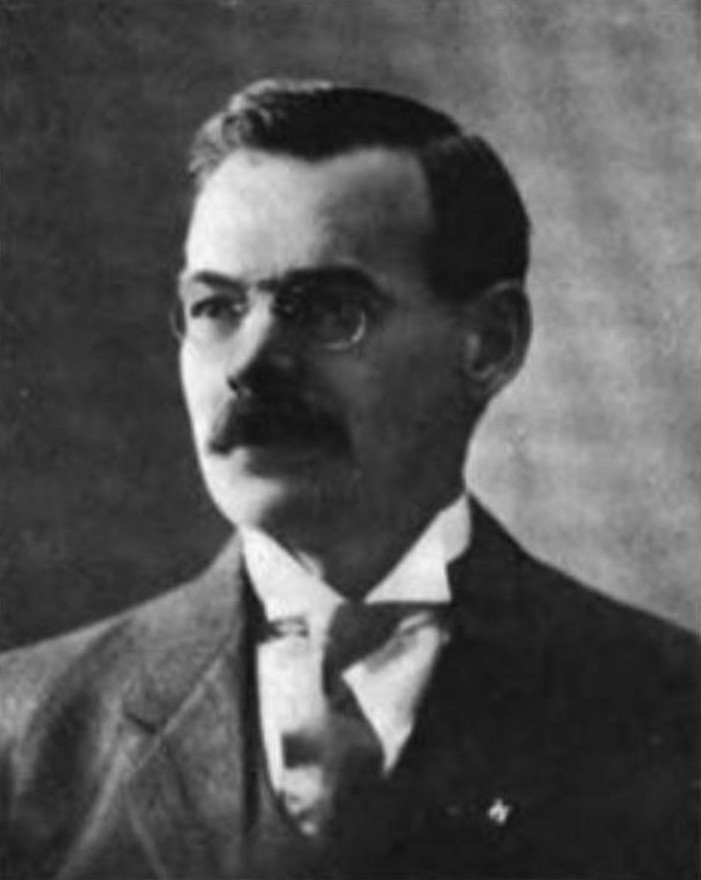
- Edward Aldrich Cudworth, 1909

Practice information
- Partners: Edward Aldrich Cudworth; Walter H. Woodworth; Arthur M. Thompson
- Founded: 1899
- Dissolved: 1942
- Location: Norwich, Connecticut, US

Significant works and honors
- Buildings: Norwich State Hospital; Mansfield State School & Hospital; Elks Club, Willimantic; Fanning Annex, Jewett City; Undercliff Sanitarium, Meriden

Cudworth & Woodworth, later Cudworth, Woodworth & Thompson and Cudworth & Thompson, was an architectural firm from Norwich, Connecticut.

== Partner biographies ==
Edward Aldrich Cudworth was born December 11, 1861, in Boston. He attended Roxbury Latin School, before moving on to Harvard University, class of 1884. Originally going into sales, he switched to architecture. He attended the Massachusetts Institute of Technology for two years, and worked for H. H. Richardson and Cummings & Sears in Massachusetts and Clarence Sumner Luce in New York City. In 1887 he left Luce and went to Norwich, forming a partnership with James A. Hiscox. Neither understood the business fully, and Cudworth & Hiscox rarely made a profit in the two years it was in business. After 1889, he for several architects and engineers in Boston until 1895, when he went to work for Norwich architect Charles H. Preston. He remained with Preston until 1899, when he opened his own office. In 1901 Walter H. Woodworth joined the firm, and died in 1915. Cudworth died in 1937, and was buried in Norwich.

Walter H. Woodworth was born on October 8, 1874, in Quaker Hill, Connecticut. He was trained in construction, and in 1901 became a construction superintendent for J. A. Hiscox, Cudworth's erstwhile partner. Only a few months later, he joined Cudworth as partner. A few years later he fell ill, and gradually retired from active practice. In 1915 A. M. Thompson was added as partner, and Woodworth died soon after, on June 1, 1915.

Arthur M. Thompson became a partner in the firm in 1915, which became Cudworth, Woodworth & Thompson. In 1916, it was renamed Cudworth & Thompson. Thompson operated the firm past Cudworth's 1937 death, into the 1940s.

== Architectural works ==
=== Cudworth & Woodworth, 1901-1915 ===
- 1901 - Danielson M. E. Church, 9 Spring St, Danielson, Connecticut
- 1903 - Norwich State Hospital, Laurel Hill Rd, Preston, Connecticut
  - The firm built further buildings on the campus through the 1930s, but only the 1903 administration building stands.
- 1906 - Converse Art Gallery, Norwich Free Academy, Norwich, Connecticut
- 1907 - Thomas Loan and Trust Building, 34 Courthouse Sq, Norwich, Connecticut
- 1909 - Tirrell Building, Norwich Free Academy, Norwich, Connecticut
- 1910 - John L. Mitchell House, 5 Rockwell Ter, Norwich, Connecticut
- 1911 - Chelsea Savings Bank Building, Main & Cliff Sts, Norwich, Connecticut
- 1912 - First National Bank Building, 22 Railroad Ave, Plainfield, Connecticut
- 1914 - Addition to Elks Club, Norwich, Connecticut

=== Cudworth, Woodworth & Thompson, 1915-1916 ===
- 1916 - Mansfield State Training School and Hospital, Middle Tpk, Mansfield, Connecticut

=== Cudworth & Thompson, 1916-1940s ===
- 1917 - Holy Trinity Greek Orthodox Church, 80 Water St, Danielson, Connecticut
- 1917 - Parish House for Hanover Congregational Church, 266 Main St, Baltic, Connecticut
- 1920 - Shetucket Co. Office Building, 387 N Main St, Norwich, Connecticut
- 1921 - Disco Building, 257 Main St, Norwich, Connecticut
- 1925 - Elks Club, 198 Pleasant St, Willimantic, Connecticut
- 1928 - Fanning Annex to the Slater Library, 26 Main St, Jewett City, Connecticut
- 1928 - Masonic Temple, 194 Washington St, Norwich, Connecticut
  - The building was built on the site of a native burial ground, and was purchased (1999) and demolished (2006) by the Mohegan tribe.
- 1929 - Jewett City Savings Bank Building, 111 Main St, Jewett City, Connecticut
- 1929 - Undercliff Sanitarium, Undercliff Rd, Meriden, Connecticut
  - Demolished in 2013.
- 1942 - Oakwood Knoll Apartments, Oakwood Knoll, Norwich, Connecticut

== Gallery of architectural works ==
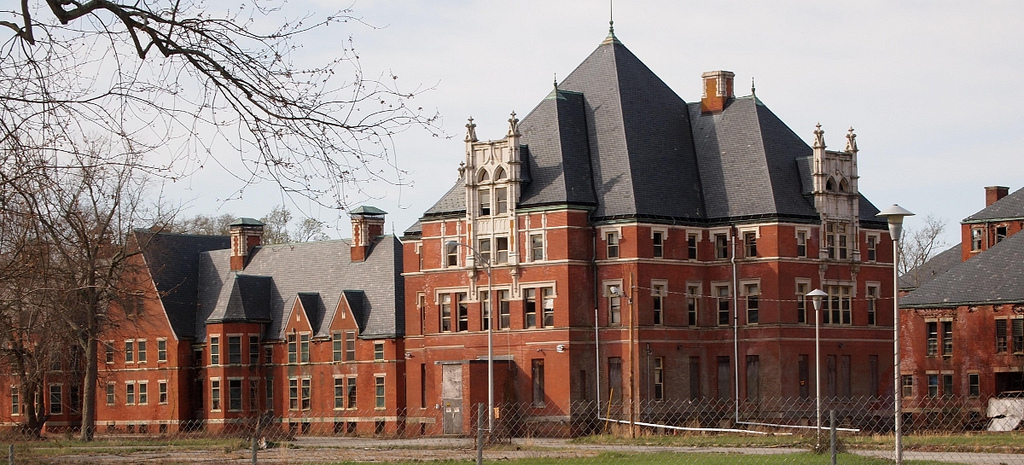
Administration Building, Norwich State Hospital, Preston, Connecticut, 1903.

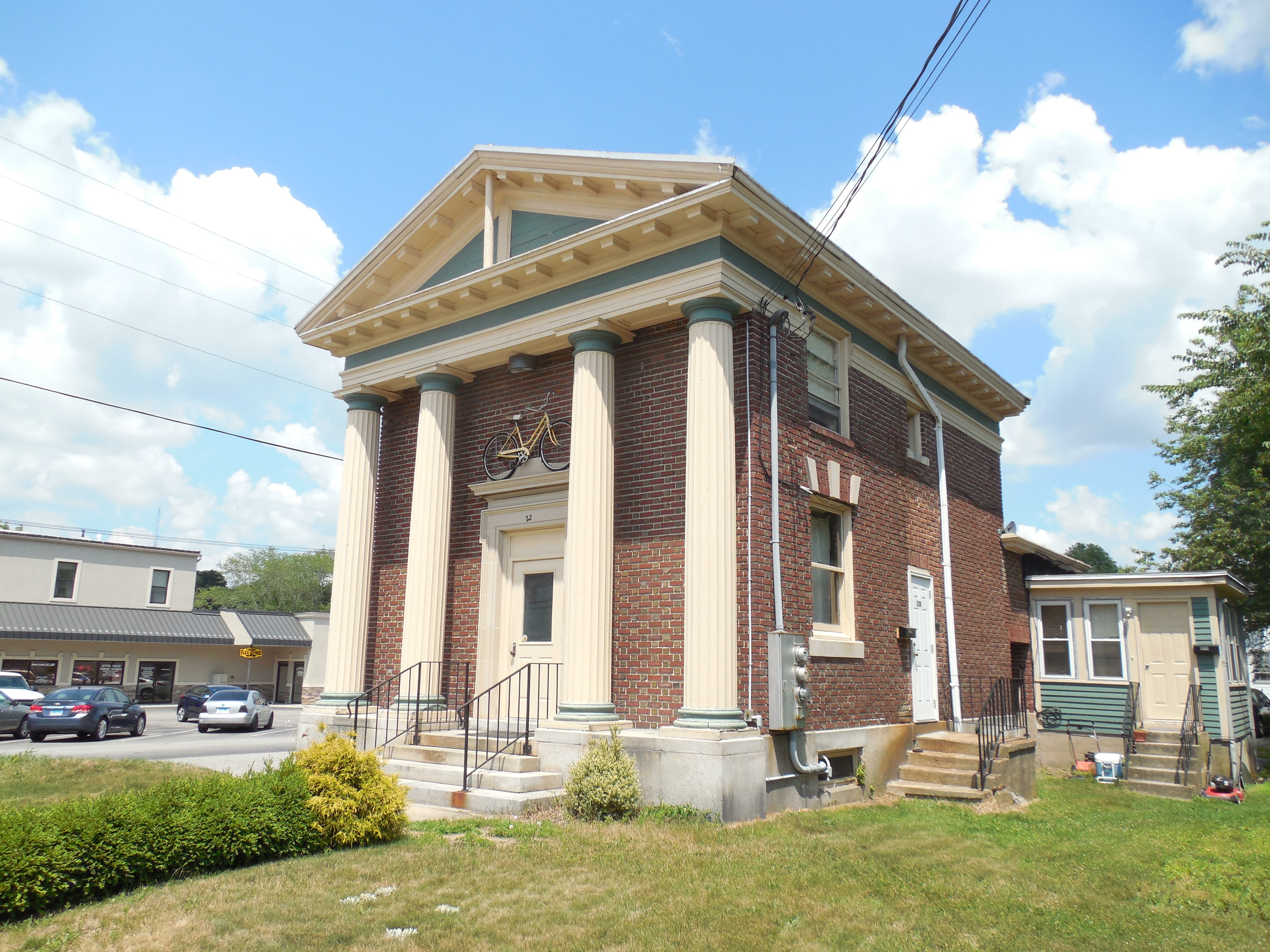
First National Bank Building, Plainfield, Connecticut, 1912.

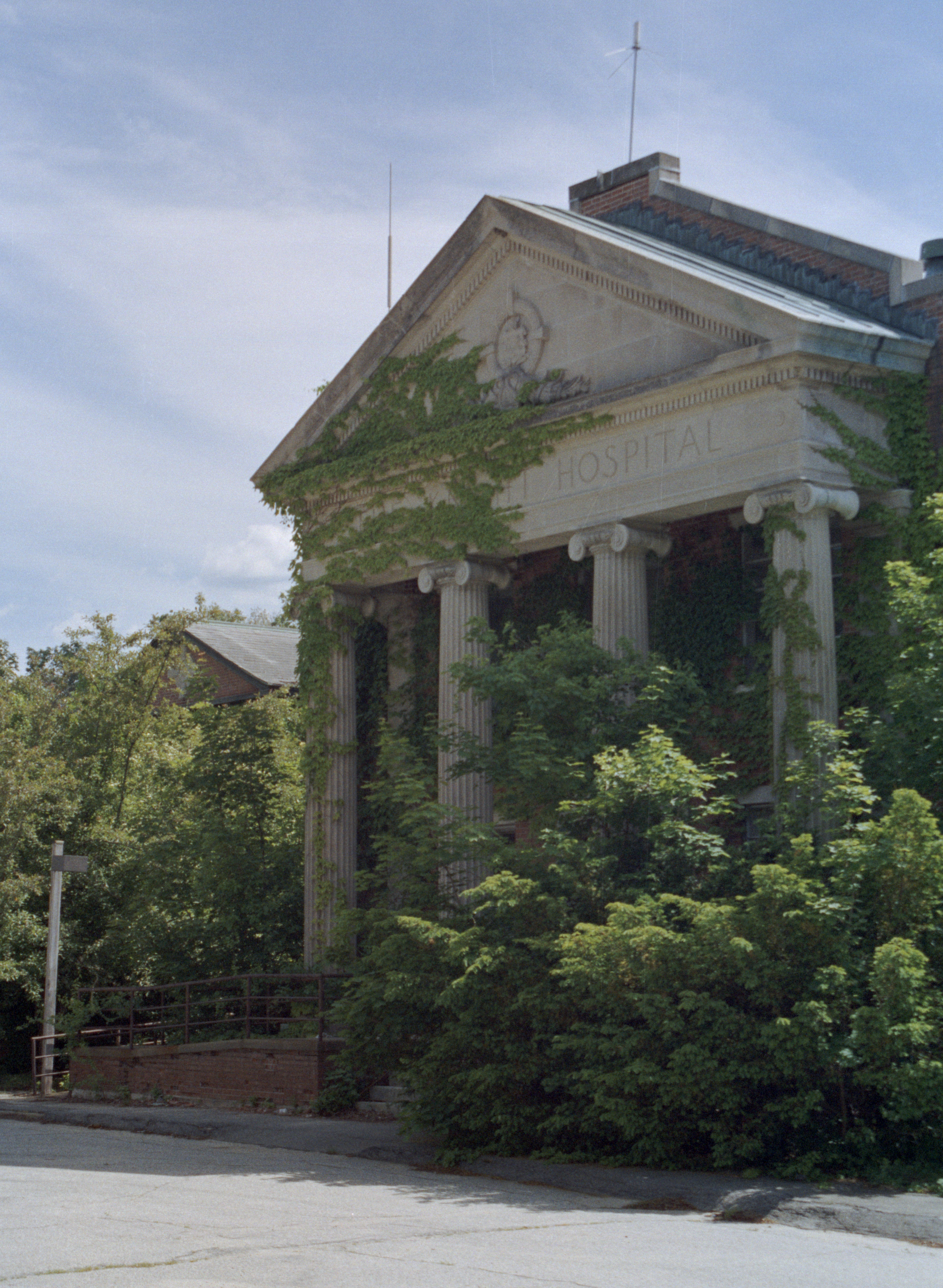
State Training School, Mansfield, Connecticut, 1916.

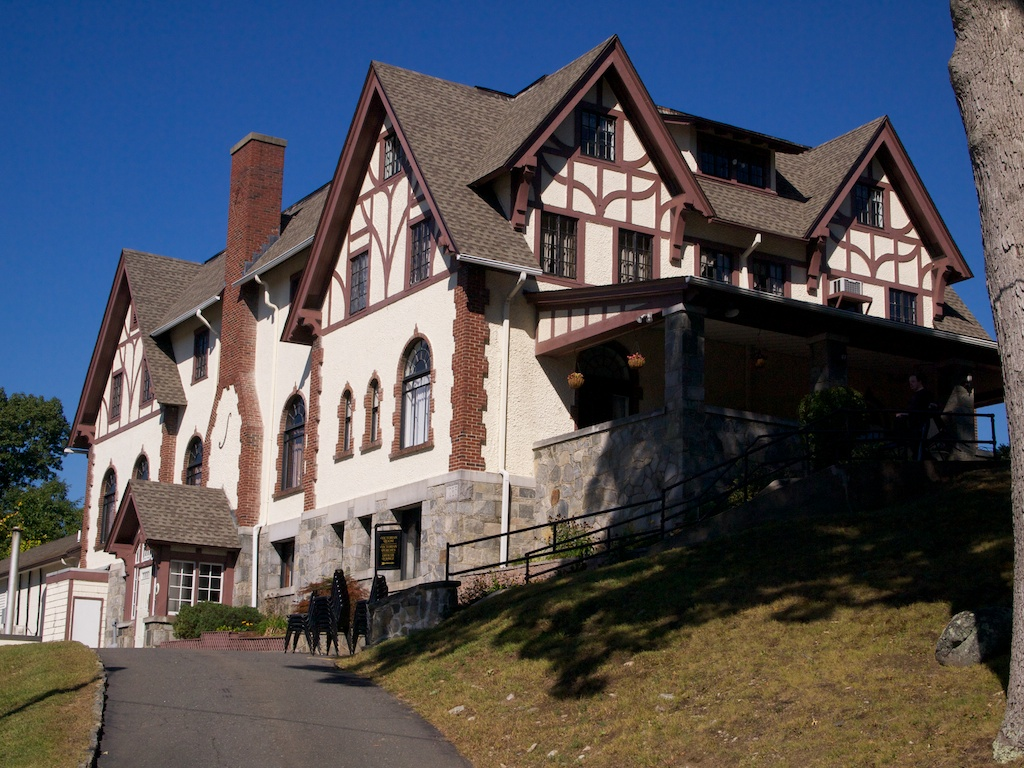
Elks Club, Willimantic, Connecticut, 1925.

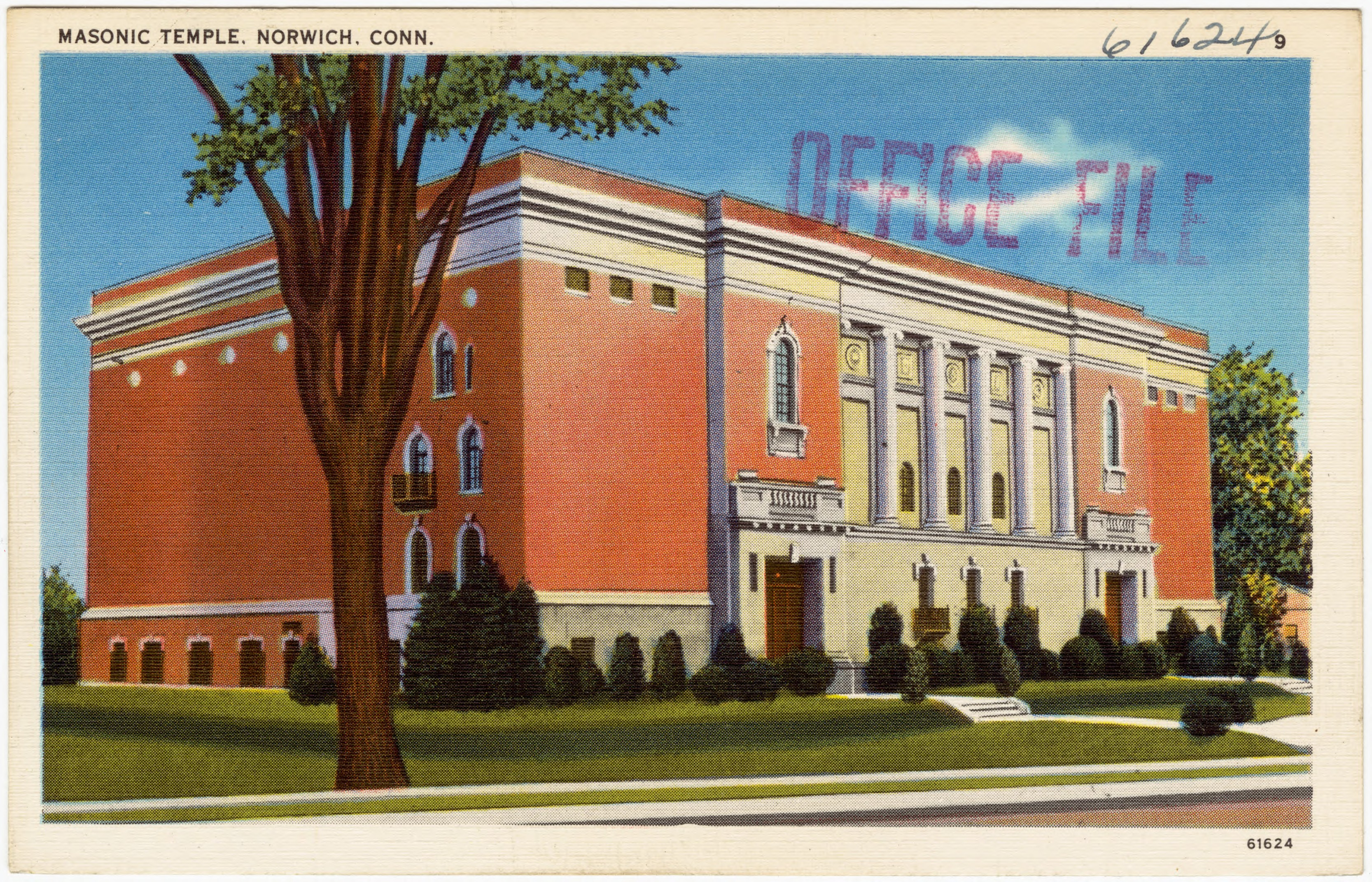
Masonic Temple, Norwich, Connecticut, 1928.
