= Mansfield Training School and Hospital =

- U.S. National Register of Historic Places
- U.S. Historic district
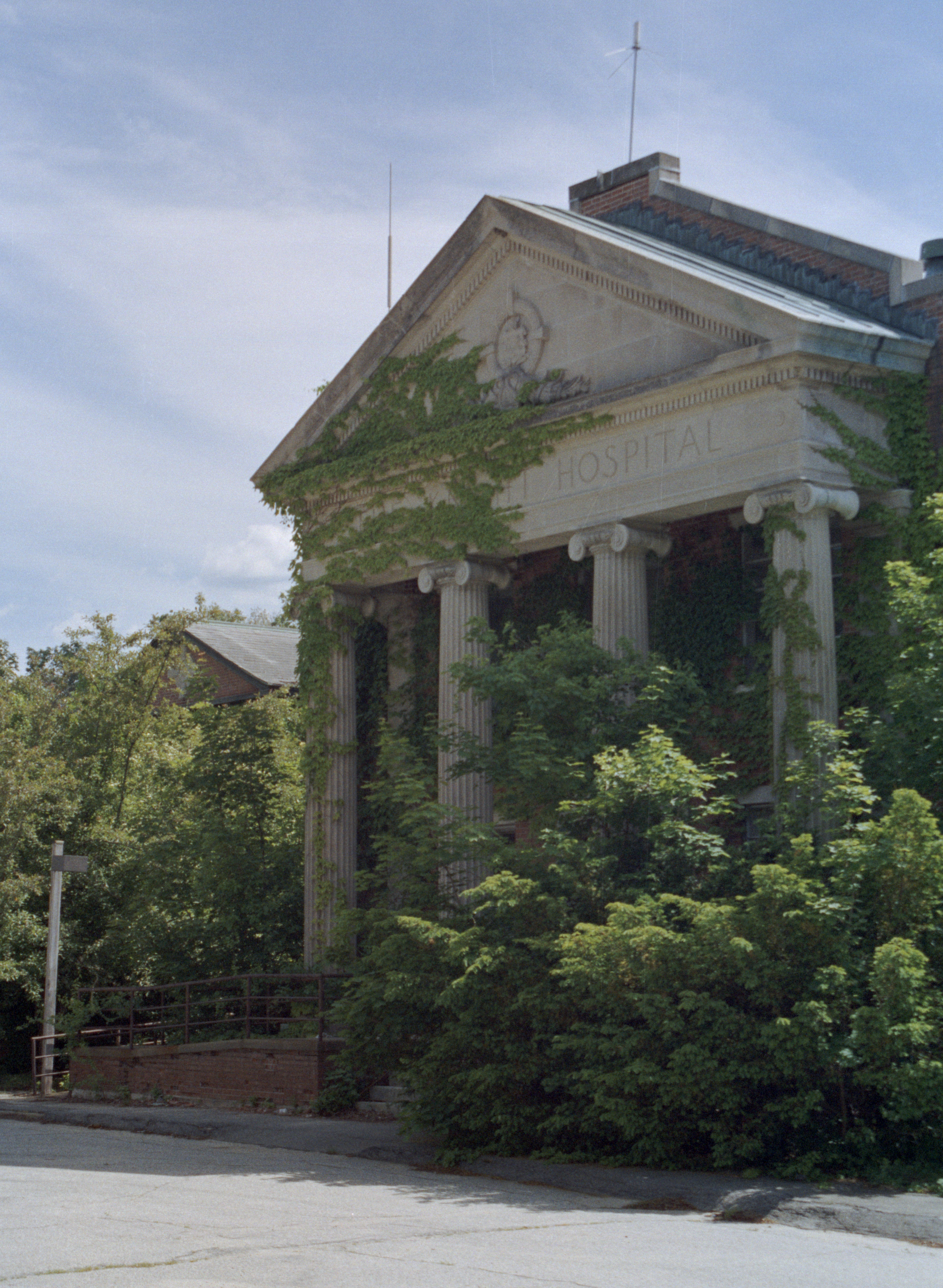
- The Knight Hospital
- Interactive map of Mansfield Training School and Hospital
- Location: Junction of CT 32 & US 44, Mansfield, Connecticut
- Coordinates: 41°48′24″N 72°17′47″W
- Area: 350 acres (140 ha)
- Built: 1917
- Architect: Cudworth, Woodworth & Thompson
- Architectural style: Late 19th and 20th Century Revivals; Greek Revival; Late Victorian
- NRHP reference No.: 87001513
- Added to NRHP: December 22, 1987

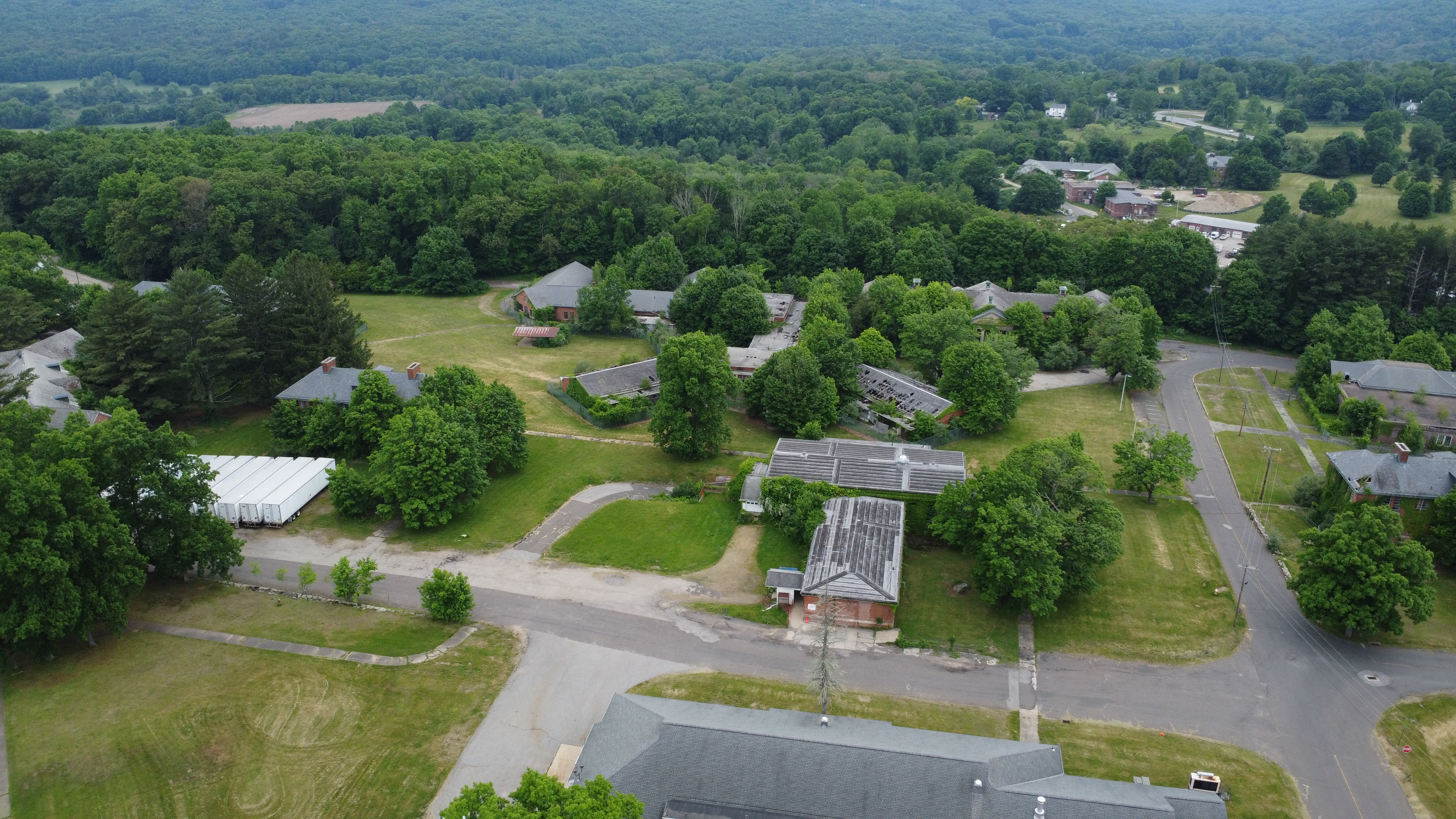
The training school is the top-center building.

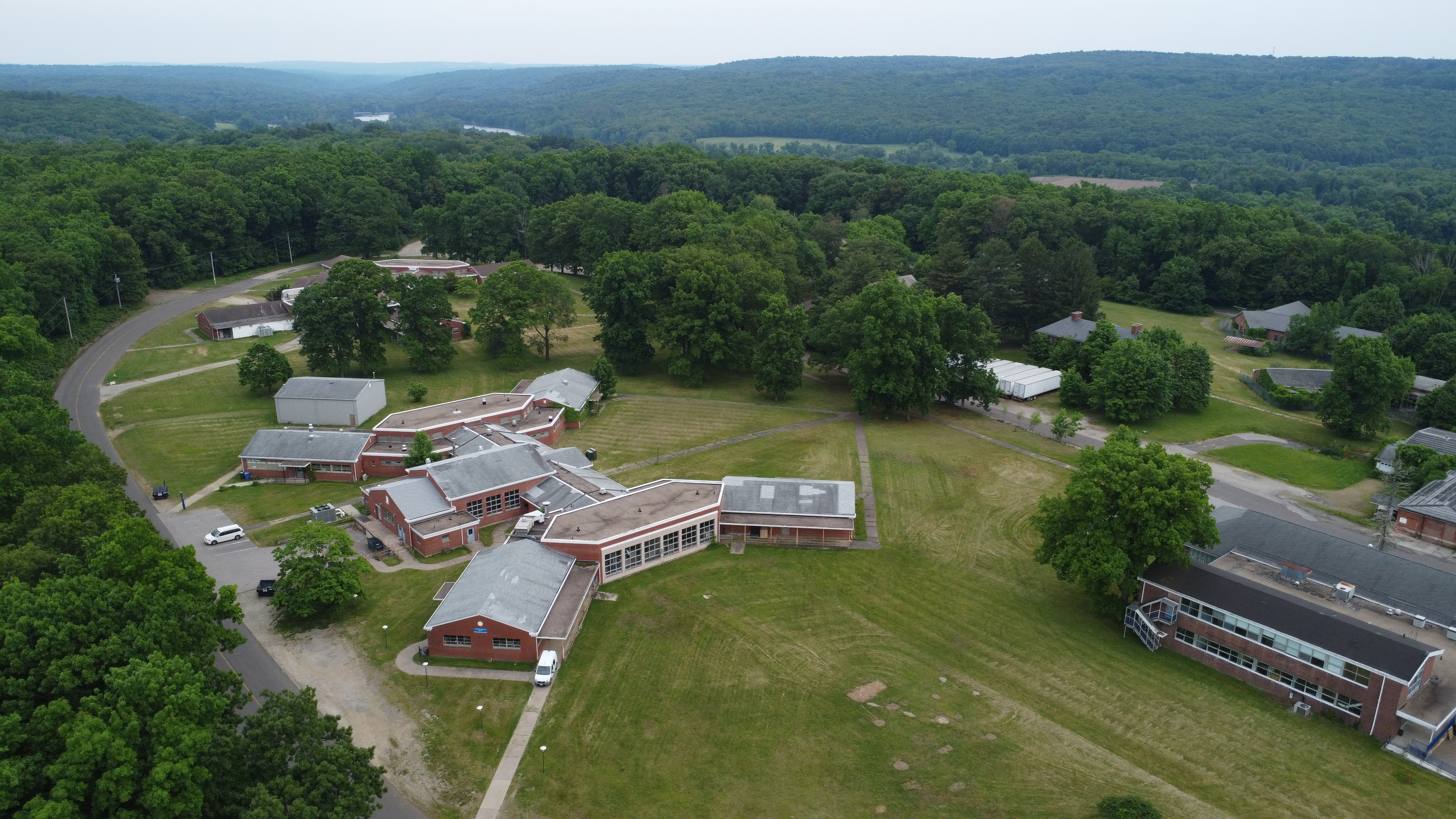
This building is located near the Mansfield Training school, located in the top right corner of this picture

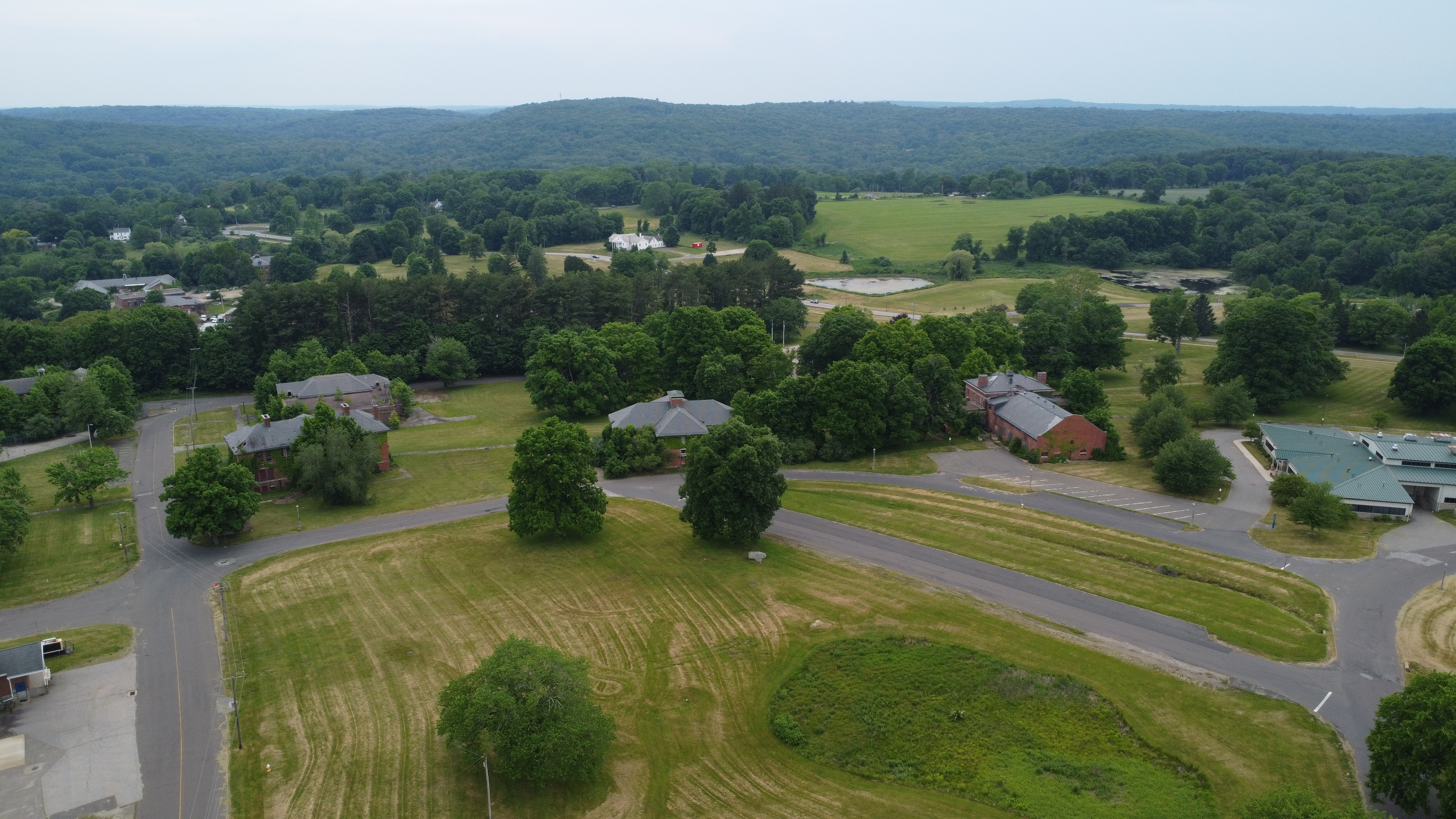
The training school is on the current UConn Depot Campus

The Mansfield Training School and Hospital was a state school for people with developmental disabilities located in Mansfield, Connecticut, United States. It was active from 1860 to 1993. Its former campus, located at the junction of Connecticut Route 32 and United States Route 44 in Mansfield is a 350-acre (140 ha) historic district that was listed on the National Register of Historic Places in 1987.

== History ==
The hospital opened in Lakeville in 1860 as the Connecticut School for Imbeciles at Lakeville. Its name was changed to the Connecticut Training School for the Feebleminded at Lakeville in 1915. Two years later, it merged with the Connecticut Colony for Epileptics (founded at Mansfield in 1910) and acquired its present name.

When it opened in 1917, the merged institution had 402 students in residence. By 1932, the resident population had grown to 1,070. During the Depression and World War II, demand for its services increased, resulting in both overcrowding and long waiting lists for new enrollments. The institution was also hit hard by the Spanish Influenza epidemic of 1918/1919, around 200 out of 300 patients contracted the Spanish Flu. 30 would die and all care would be placed onto one doctor, Dr. LaMoure, and one nurse. Staffing levels increased during the 1960s as philosophies on the treatment of mental disability changed, and there were 1,609 residents and 875 full-time staff as of 1969. During the 1970s and 1980s, many residents were relocated from dormitories to on-campus cottages or to group homes located around the state. By 1976 the resident population had dropped to 1,106, and by 1991 just 141 people remained as residents.

In 1993, after numerous lawsuits concerning the conditions of the hospital, Mansfield Training School was closed and its patients sent to outpatient facilities and other institutions. After the closure, some dilapidated buildings were demolished. Other buildings were split between the Bergin Correctional Institution and the University of Connecticut.

== Abuse ==
The school has had a number of abuse and mistreatment allegations, Glady Burr, for example, filed a lawsuit in 1979 for $125 million because of the abuse she faced. She claimed denial of civil rights as well as being used to slavery. She was also wrongfully committed to the facility, her mother did not want to care for her and had tests on her mental state manipulated. She was awarded $235K. The 1978 lawsuit Conn. CARC v. Thorne alleged unconstitutional treatment of patients. This included subpar living conditions, care quality, and residential placement. The state of Connecticut would continue investigation into the 90s when they found DNR (do not resuscitate) labels being inappropriately placed on patients. This would lead the downfall of the institution. Residents would be moved to community-oriented homes, representing a new approach to the treatment of disabled people emerging. There was a shift towards placing disabled people into the community, instead of outcasting them around this time. The institution utilized "treatment" now understood as cruel, such as straitjacket and lobotomies.

== Historic district ==
The "Mansfield Training School and Hospital" was listed on the National Register of Historic Places in 1987. The listed area was 350 acres (1.4 km^{2}) and included 53 contributing buildings and seven non-contributing buildings. The majority of the contributing buildings were institutional buildings built between 1914 and 1930, all designed by the same architectural firm. Also, the district included a farm that was operated beginning in 1909. The farm supplied the institution with most of its food and provided occupational therapy for people with epilepsy, as farm labor was deemed to prevent epileptic seizures. Children housed in the institution hand-molded the concrete blocks used to construct barns on the farm property.

The caretaker's residence was featured on the SyFy channel's Paranormal Witness on September 28, 2011, as a location of alleged paranormal activity.

== See also ==
- National Register of Historic Places listings in Tolland County, Connecticut
