= Bergin Correctional Institution =

Former prison in Connecticut, United States

- Interactive map of Bergin Correctional Institution
- Location: Storrs, Connecticut; 41°48′47″N 72°17′50″W
- Status: Closed
- Security class: Level 2 (Low)
- Capacity: 600
- Opened: 1989
- Closed: August 12, 2011
- Managed by: Connecticut, Department of Correction
- Director: Wardens: 1989-1991 William D. Morabito; 1991-1994 Mary H. Buell; 1994-2001 Evelyn Bush; 2001-2003 Sandra A. Sawicki; 2003-2009 Eileen Higgins

Bergin Correctional Institution was a low-security state prison for men in Storrs, Connecticut. It was built in 1988 as the Northeast Correctional Institution and received its first inmates on March 13, 1989. After briefly closing in 1997 and reopening in 1999, the prison closed for good on August 12, 2011, due to years of declining prisoner population.

== History ==
The buildings and campus of Bergin Correctional Institution have been put to a number of uses by the State of Connecticut. Before being converted to a prison, the property was part of the Mansfield Training School and Hospital for people with mental disabilities. As the Mansfield Training School, portions of the property are listed on the National Register of Historic Places.

The Northeast Correctional Institution was established as a pre-release center for inmates nearing the end of their sentences and specialized in preparing inmates for re-integration into society. It had a number of occupational and substance-abuse treatment programs available, and housed inmates in dormitory-style housing and in cottages.

The prison closed in 1997 but reopened in 1999. On February 3, 2001, the name of the prison was changed to honor late Captain Donald T. Bergin, who had helped open the institution. The prison closed for good on August 12, 2011, due to years of declining prisoner population and budget cuts.

The University of Connecticut leased the former prison for offices and laboratory space. The university acquired the property in March 2015, aiming to redevelop the prison sleeping rooms and gymnasium into project rooms and offices. These plans fell through, and UConn transferred the property back to the state in December 2021. The site is considered for the future location of a new regional technical high school, which would replace Windham Technical High School in Willimantic.
