= John Fox Slater House =

- U.S. Historic district – Contributing property
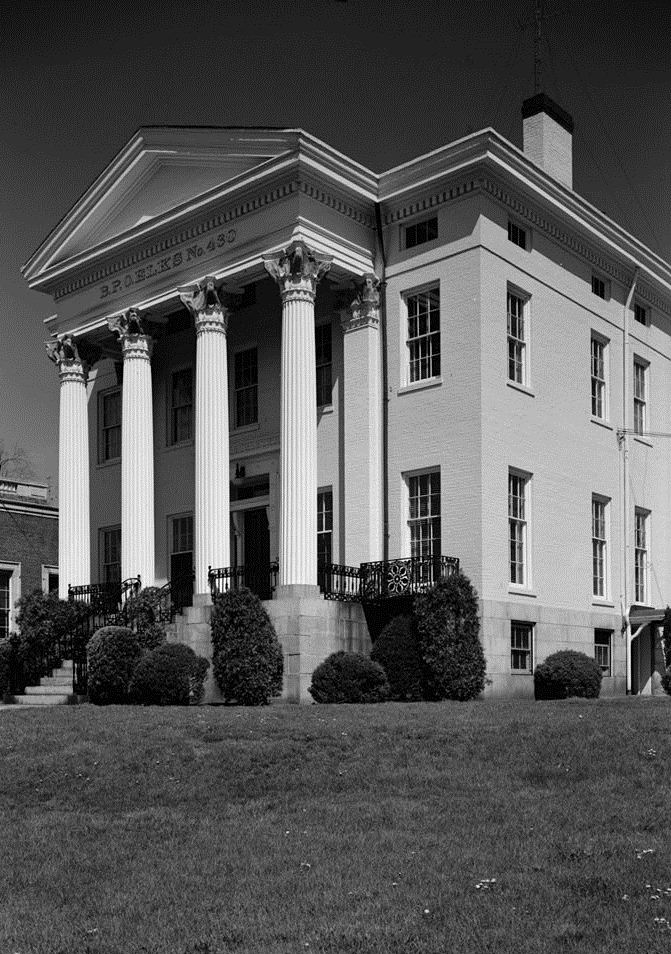
- John F. Slater House in 1958

- Location within Connecticut Location within the United States
- Location: 352 Main Street
- Coordinates: 41°31′28.2″N 72°4′14.88″W
- Built: 1827 or 1843; 1914
- Built by: Doyle & Murphy (1914)
- Architect: Cudworth & Woodworth (1914)
- Architectural style: Greek Revival
- Part of: Downtown Norwich Historic District (ID85000707)
- Added to NRHP: April 4, 1985

The John F. Slater House, also known as the Elks Club, is a historic building in Norwich, Connecticut.

It was built in brick for John Fox Slater around either 1827 or 1843. It was added to the National Register of Historic Places in 1985 as part of the Downtown Norwich Historic District as "the most elaborate Greek Revival building in the downtown", and it is fronted by a monumental Corinthian portico. The design of the house has been attributed to John Bishop, a builder from New London who was responsible for the Huntington Street Baptist Church. The house was later owned by the local lodge of Elks, who used the building as their clubhouse. In 1914-15 they built a large but complementary rear addition, designed by architects Cudworth & Woodworth and contractors Doyle & Murphy, the same team that would build the Willimantic Elks Club ten years later.

The building was vacant as of January 2014.

== See also ==
- Slater Memorial Museum
