= Norwich State Hospital =

- Norwich Hospital District
- U.S. National Register of Historic Places
- U.S. Historic district
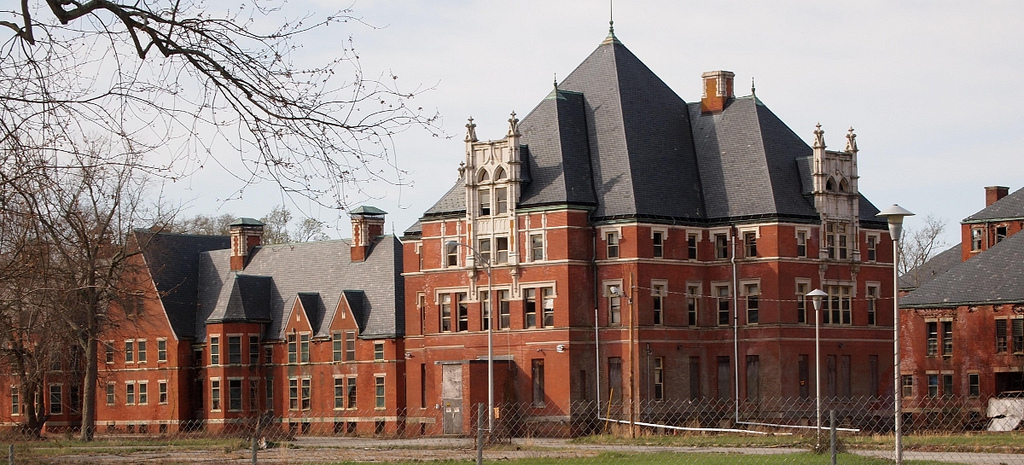
- Interactive map of Norwich Hospital District
- Location: CT 12, Norwich-Preston, Connecticut
- Coordinates: 41°29′21″N 72°4′24″W
- Area: 70 acres (28 ha)
- Built: 1903
- Architect: Cudworth & Woodworth
- Architectural style: Colonial Revival, Late Gothic Revival
- NRHP reference No.: 87002424
- Added to NRHP: January 22, 1988

The Norwich State Hospital, originally established as the Norwich State Hospital for the Insane, later shortened to the Norwich Hospital, was a psychiatric hospital located in Preston and Norwich, Connecticut. It opened its doors in October 1904 and operated until October 10, 1996. Throughout the near-century it operated, it housed geriatric patients, chemically dependent patients, and from 1931-1939, tubercular patients. The hospital, which sits on the banks of the Thames River, began with a single building on 100 acres of land, and expanded to over 30 buildings and 900 acres at its peak. A 70 acre property including the hospital was listed as a historic district on the National Register of Historic Places in 1988.

After the closure of the hospital in 1996 all remaining patients were transferred out, and the property was left unused and abandoned. Multiple parties expressed interest in the property, and in 2009, the State of Connecticut sold the 393 acres of the Norwich State Hospital site to the town of Preston for $1 and with the sale the town of Preston agreed to perform the needed environmental remediation of the property before any development was to begin on the site. The town of Preston reached an agreement in May 2016 with the Mohegan Tribe to develop the property into the Preston Riverwalk. This is described by the Mohegan Tribe as a "non-gaming destination with outdoor and indoor attractions, hotel and retail space, restaurants, housing, a marina, an RV Park and more".

Currently the grounds of the State Hospital are undergoing remediation and demolition work in preparation for the planned Preston Riverwalk. The Mohegan Tribe has stated that the Administration building will be preserved and restored as part of the project.

== History ==
=== Development of the grounds ===
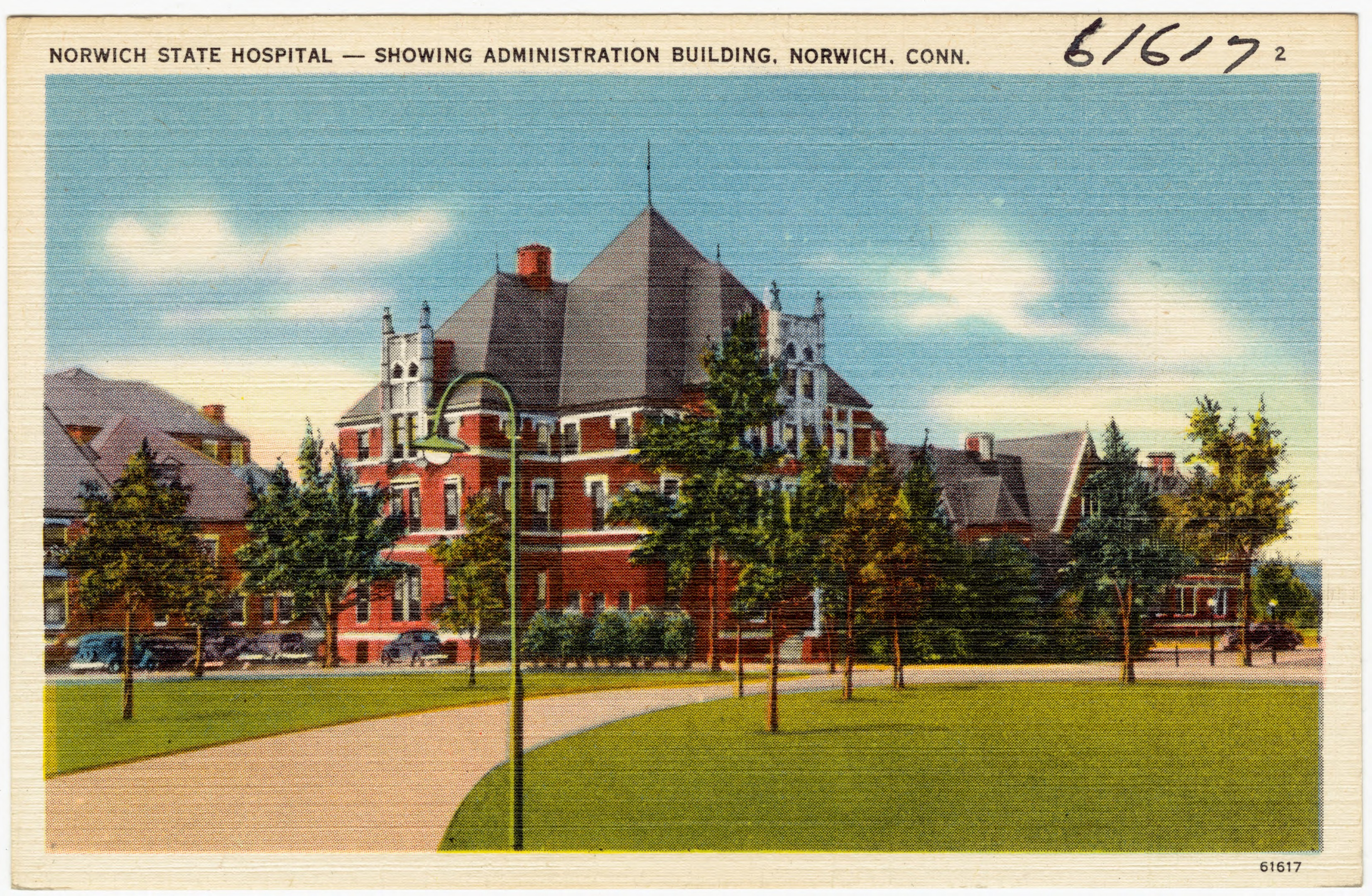
Vintage illustrated postcard, circa 1930-1945

In October, 1904 when the hospital first opened, it held 95 patients and was a single building. The facility quickly outgrew its meager beginnings, and by fall of 1905, it held 151 patients and had expanded its housing by adding two additional buildings. The original building was soon converted to administrative offices. In 1907, a third patient building was opened, and over the next eight years, there would be the addition of thirteen structures to the grounds. The hospital began to branch out, no longer creating housing intended only for patients, but for hospital physicians, a laboratory, an employees club, a main kitchen and various other structures to support the every-day workings of the hospital. Like most mental hospitals at that time, it was self-sufficient, a barn, two garages, a paint shop and a greenhouse were also added. By the end of the 1930s, over twenty buildings had been added to the grounds.

To provide an identification system, each building was originally assigned a letter name. The original campus had ward buildings grouped in pairs and designated as "North" for female patients or "South" for male patients. Around 1940, each building was given a name in honor of the founding superintendents of the American Psychiatric Association and well-known mental health advocates such as Thomas Story Kirkbride and Dorothea Dix. Later buildings were named after recognized contributors to the hospital, including Connecticut governors Abraham Ribicoff and John Davis Lodge. The Ronald H. Kettle Center opened in 1960 as the new medical-surgical facility and was the largest building on the property. Built like a general hospital, it reflected the then-modern belief that mental illness could be treated biologically on a short-term stay, thus reducing the need for antiquated long-term care wards. The Ribicoff Research Center was built perpendicular to Kettle to facilitate the discovery of new treatment techniques. Gradually, as the number of patients and employees began to decrease, when a new structure was built, an older one would be closed, and by the early 1970s, only 7 of the original buildings were still in use, the others used for either storage or abandoned completely. As the process of deinstitutionalization progressed, a new law required all patients' cases to be reviewed every two years. This, along with threats of strike from the union, lead to the hospital vacating many more of its buildings in 1979. By the time the hospital closed in 1996, only a fraction of the campus was still operating. All patients were now housed in the Kettle building along with geriatric patients in Seymour. The Gallup building continued to house the Boneski Treatment Center for chemical dependency, and other buildings still in use up to closure included Administration, Lodge, Russell, Ribicoff, the chapel, utility buildings, and employee housing facilities across the street.

Due to the large number to structures and the hundreds of acres they stood on, the majority of buildings were connected by a series of underground passageways. The main purpose of these tunnels were for the utilities, however, they were often used to transport patients from one area to another. In the mid 2000's, the tunnels became a means of transportation for trespassers who hope to explore the grounds of the hospital undetected by the security officers who have been hired by the state to patrol the vacant site.

=== Timeline of changes and patient census (1904 to 1996) ===
- 1904-Established as Norwich State Hospital for the Insane, patient population was 95
- 1904-Henry M. Pollock, M.D. became Superintendent
- 1905-Establishment of a training school for nurses
- 1913-Patient population was 998
- 1916-Patient population was 1,227
- 1917-Franklin Wilcox, M.D. became Superintendent
- 1918-Patient population was 1,231
- 1920-Patient population was 1,341
- 1926-Name was changed to Norwich State Hospital
- 1928-Elijah S. Burdsall, M.D. became Superintendent
- 1929-Patient population was 2,175
- 1930-Patient population was 2,422, training school for nurses closed due to inability to meet the standards of the State Board of Nurse Examiners
- 1934-Chester A. Waterman, M.D. became Superintendent
- 1939-Patient population was 2,918.
- 1939-Governor Baldwin and the State Legislature form the Commission on the Treatment and Care of People Afflicted with Physical or Mental Disabilities. First order of business was the investigation of conditions at Norwich State Hospital.
- 1940-William A. Bryan, M.D. became Superintendent
- 1941-For the first time since opening, discharges of patients (917) exceeded the admissions of patients (626)
- 1942-Superintendent Bryan responds to the staffing crisis during World War II by using conscientious objectors
- 1942-Superintendent Bryan employs selected patients to serve as "patient attendants" during World War II
- 1945-Riley H. Guthrie, M.D. became Superintendent
- 1948-Ronald H. Kettle, M.D. became Superintendent
- 1953-Administratively transferred to the Department of Mental Health
- 1955-Patient population was 3,184 (highest annual average in hospital's history)
- 1960-Patient population was 2,685
- 1961-Renamed Norwich Hospital
- 1966-Morgan Martin, M.D. became Superintendent
- 1972-Patient population was 1,148
- 1978-Francis K. Hayes became Superintendent
- 1984-Luigi Saracino M.D. became Superintendent
- 1985-Garrell S. Mullaney became Superintendent
- 1988-National Register of Historic Places listing
- 1994-Total beds were 649
- 1996-Andrew S. Phillips became Superintendent
- 1996-Norwich Hospital was officially closed and remaining patients were transferred to Connecticut Valley Hospital

== Facilities ==
=== Hospital Buildings ===
Name	Original Name	Year Constructed	Year Closed	Architecture	Sq. Ft.	Original Use	Later Uses	Notes
Administration Building		1908	1996	Late Gothic Revival	22,391	Administrative offices		The building has been weatherized and buttoned up to prevent further decay and is being saved for future development.
Central Theater, Dance Hall, Cafeteria, and Storeroom	Main Building	1908	1996	Late Gothic Revival	79,396	Theater, cafeteria, kitchen, dance hall, storeroom		A 1950s kitchen addition was built on the back of the building that continued to be used until the hospital's closure.
Lippitt Building		1920	1979	Colonial Revival	22,391	Medical/surgical	Methadone clinic	The second medical/surgical building of its kind in the country.
Russell Occupational Therapy Building		1956	1996	Modern	106,186	Occupational therapy, recreation, rehabilitative classes		The patient canteen and security office were also housed in the Russell Building.
Ribicoff Research Center		1962	1996	Modern	30,635	Clinical psychiatric and pathological research laboratory
Pond View Building		1959	1996	Modern		Employee housing
Martin House	Outreach	1930s	1996	Colonial Revival	23,566	Employee housing	Outreach program, later the Martin House program	The Martin House program provided low-income housing for former psychiatric patients.
Pathway House	Gateway	1930s	1996	Colonial Revival	23,566	Employee housing	Gateway program, later Pathway House	Pathway House provided a psychosocial rehabilitation program.
Nurses' Home		1939	1996	Colonial Revival		Nurses' dormitory
Chapel		1963	1996	Modern	7,617	Chapel		A daycare program for children of hospital employees was built but never opened in the newly renovated chapel in 1996.

=== Patient Ward Buildings ===
Name	Original Name	Year Constructed	Year Closed	Architecture	Sq. Ft.	Original Use	Later Uses	Notes
Ronald H. Kettle Treatment Center		1959	1997	Modern	250,000	Admissions, medical treatment, and offices		Following the hospital's closure, the Southeastern Connecticut Mental Health Authority occupied this building until 1997.
Lodge Building		1956	1997	Modern	96,395	Women's treatment center	Continued care facility	Although the last patients moved out in 1994, the Southeastern Connecticut Mental Health Authority occupied this building until 1997.
Seymour Building		1939	1996	Colonial Revival	32,156	Medical infirmary	Intensive geriatric care and admissions
Salmon and Awl Buildings	South and North A	1905	1971	Late Gothic Revival	24,508	Male maximum Security / Female parlor ward
Brigham and Bell Buildings	South and North B	1907	1970s	Late Gothic Revival	45,840	Male, female patient housing	Token economy program (Bell)	The last patients moved out of both buildings in 1971.
White and Cutter Buildings	South and North C	1910s	White: 1956, Cutter: 1967	Colonial Revival		Male, female patient housing	Storage	In 1975, Cutter was demolished and White was reduced to one story to preserve the underground utilities going to Stribling.
Stribling and Dix Buildings	South and North D	1911	Stribling: 1979, Dix: 1956	Colonial Revival	20,086	Violent male, female patient housing	Storage
Earle and Butler Buildings	South and North E	1912	Earle: 1990s, Butler: 1970s	Colonial Revival	29,248	Epileptic male, female patient housing	Maintenance building (Earle), trade school (Butler)	The last patients moved out of both buildings in 1956.
Stedman and Woodward Buildings	South and North F	1913	1980s	Colonial Revival	31,472	Male, female patient housing	Housekeeping (Stedman), finance and control classes (Woodward)	The last patients moved out of both buildings in 1971.
Gallup and Mitchell Buildings	South H and North G (see note)	1926	Gallup: 1996, Mitchell: 1970s	Colonial Revival	46,069	Well-behaved male, female patient housing	Boneski Treatment Center (Gallup), Valiance House (Mitchell)	The Eugene T. Boneski Treatment Center occupied the Gallup Building from 1987 to 1996. A conflicting source labels Gallup and Mitchell as South and North G, however, two other sources group Galt and Mitchell together.
Galt Building	South G	1922	1980s	Colonial Revival	35,762	Geriatric male patient housing	Firehouse	The last patients moved out in 1971.
Ray Building	North H	1926	1996	Colonial Revival	26,606	Geriatric female patient housing	Print shop	The last patients moved out in 1979. Ray is identical to Kirkbride.
Kirkbride Building	South K	1926	1996	Colonial Revival	26,606	Geriatric male patient housing	Red Cross shelter	The last patients moved out in 1979. Kirkbride is identical to Ray. Despite its name, the building was not designed under the Kirkbride Plan.
Bryan Building		1936	1979	Colonial Revival	26,606	Geriatric patient housing	Adolescent clinic	The building was originally the New London County Temporary Home, but was purchased by the hospital and dedicated in 1949.
The Pines			1921			Tubercular patient housing		Originally called the "Tubercular Pavilion," the building was closed and demolished after the Seymour Building opened.

- Fifteen physician's cottages, a power house, kitchen, and laundry building were constructed in the 1950s.
- Numerous cottages, a trade school, firehouse, carpenter and maintenance shop, club house, staff house, greenhouse, and garages were constructed on the campus.
- Numerous farm buildings were demolished in the 1970s after the hospital discontinued its agricultural therapy.

== Legacy ==
The hospital was listed on the National Register in 1988. The NRHP listing included 40 contributing buildings and two contributing structures on 70 acres. It includes work by architects Cudworth & Woodworth. It includes Colonial Revival and Late Gothic Revival architecture.

The district was deemed historically significant as illustrating a historic view of mental health treatment.

In 1996, when Norwich State Hospital was closed, the State Department of Public Works (DPW) became responsible for the property. In 2005, after several unsuccessful attempts to sell the property, The DPW proposed the sale of 419 acres (170 ha) of the former hospital's campus to the town of Preston, and 61 acres (25 ha) to the town of Norwich for one dollar. Both towns were given three years to close the transfer of the property.

In March, 2009, the town of Preston purchased 390 acres (160 ha) of the property offered to them by the state. In spring of 2009, the Preston Redevelopment Agency was created to oversee the development of the newly acquired property. According to the sale agreement, the state would provide for the security presence, maintenance and insurance of the property until March, 2010, at which point the town of Preston would take responsibility for the cost of these, as well as begin the property cleanup.

== Proposals ==
Since the DPW first made an offer to the town of Preston to purchase a portion of the Norwich State Hospital, several proposals have been submitted for the use of the property. One of the earliest proposals was submitted by Utopia Studios, and was approved in May 2006. Utopia promised an entertainment complex consisting of a theme park, 4,200 hotel rooms, a performing arts school and a movie studio. The projected cost of this project was around $1.6 billion and was viewed favorably by the voters. However, in November of the same year, the proposal was canceled by the town due to Utopia missing several key deadlines and, most importantly, failing to place $53 million in escrow as agreed.

In 2008, two developers, Northlang Investment Corporation and Preston Gateway Partners LLC, sought for approval to develop the land. The town accepted Northland's proposal for a billion-dollar luxury resort, but in November 2008, this plan was ended as well. Since then, eight additional developers have submitted proposals to develop the property, but as of March 2010 no agreement has been reached.

The property, which has become known as the Preston Riverwalk, had been considered for a project by the town's parks and recreation department. This would have included a public access park for bird-watching, fishing and various other outdoor activities. On May 13, 2016, the Mohegan Tribe reached an agreement with Town of Preston to purchase the land. According to the Hartford Courant, the land will be used "for office, retail, entertainment, recreation and possibly housing." It will not become tribal land, meaning that whatever is built there will be a source of state and local tax revenue.

== Demolition, site remediation and redevelopment ==
The Norwich State Hospital is listed on both the state and national historic register as a place of architectural and historical significance and thus many of the buildings, grounds, and infrastructure can not be removed (or even cleaned of medical waste material) without exception from both state and federal historical authorities.

Demolition on the property began in Spring 2011, with the intentional caving-in of the service tunnels surrounding the Administration building. The Salmon, Awl, and the Cafeteria-Theater buildings were demolished by end of 2011. In 2012, the Ribicoff, the Power Plant, Chapel buildings along with several cottages were demolished. Demolition continued through November 2014, exposing the interior stairwell of the Kettle building which was featured in The Day. All interior roadways were stripped of asphalt by mid-late 2018 and a major excavation commenced near the site of the Lodge building.

The Administration Building has been weatherized to prevent further decay and will be saved for future development. In late 2020 the discovery of buried coal ash and its mandated remediation have required more funding to complete the cleanup. By August 2021, all buildings on the Preston side of the campus have been demolished except for the Ray, Gallup, and Mitchell buildings. A time capsule was discovered within the Russell Occupational Therapy building. The Preston Redevelopment Agency proposed transferring this time capsule to the local historical society.

Preston Redevelopment Agency stated in October 2023 that all remaining structures would stand until the property is transferred to the Mohegan Tribe. The Mohegan Tribe stated that the only structure that will be preserved once development begins is the Administration building. As of May 2024, remediation activities continue at the site.

== TV appearances ==
Episodes two and four of season one of VH1's Celebrity Paranormal Project were filmed at the mental hospital though most likely to protect the place it was referred to as Warson Asylum for the Criminally Insane during both episodes.

The Norwich State Hospital was featured in the TV series Life After People, in the episode titled "Crypt of Civilization", which aired on January 19, 2010.

Syfy Channel's Ghost Hunters paranormal investigating team explored the location in their sixth season which aired May 5, 2010.

== See also ==
- National Register of Historic Places listings in New London County, Connecticut
