= John Slater (industrialist) =

American businessman

Period paintings of John and Ruth Slater currently owned by the Slatersville Congregational Church

John Slater (December 25, 1776 – May 27, 1843) was an early American industrialist, founder of Slatersville, Rhode Island and younger brother of Samuel Slater, father of the American Industrial Revolution, and a member of the well-known Slater family.

== Biography ==
Slater was born in England in 1776 and received an education from Thomas Jackson, also his older brother's teacher, and then became a millwright's apprentice. Slater gained technical mill information in Manchester and Oldham, England to use in America. Slater immigrated in the United States in 1803 to work for Almy, Brown and Slater at Pawtucket. He eventually formed a partnership with the Providence firm of Almy and Brown, purchased land in what is now Slatersville, Rhode Island (then was the northern wilderness of Smithfield, Rhode Island) and began construction of a textile mill. By 1807, the village included the Slatersville Mill, the largest and most modern industrial building of its day, two houses for workers, the owner's house and the company store. The Slaters also donated a meeting house for Slatersville Congregational Church, which they attended. John Slater died in 1843 and was buried in Slatersville.

John Slater's son, John Fox Slater, later became a prominent philanthropist.

== Gallery ==
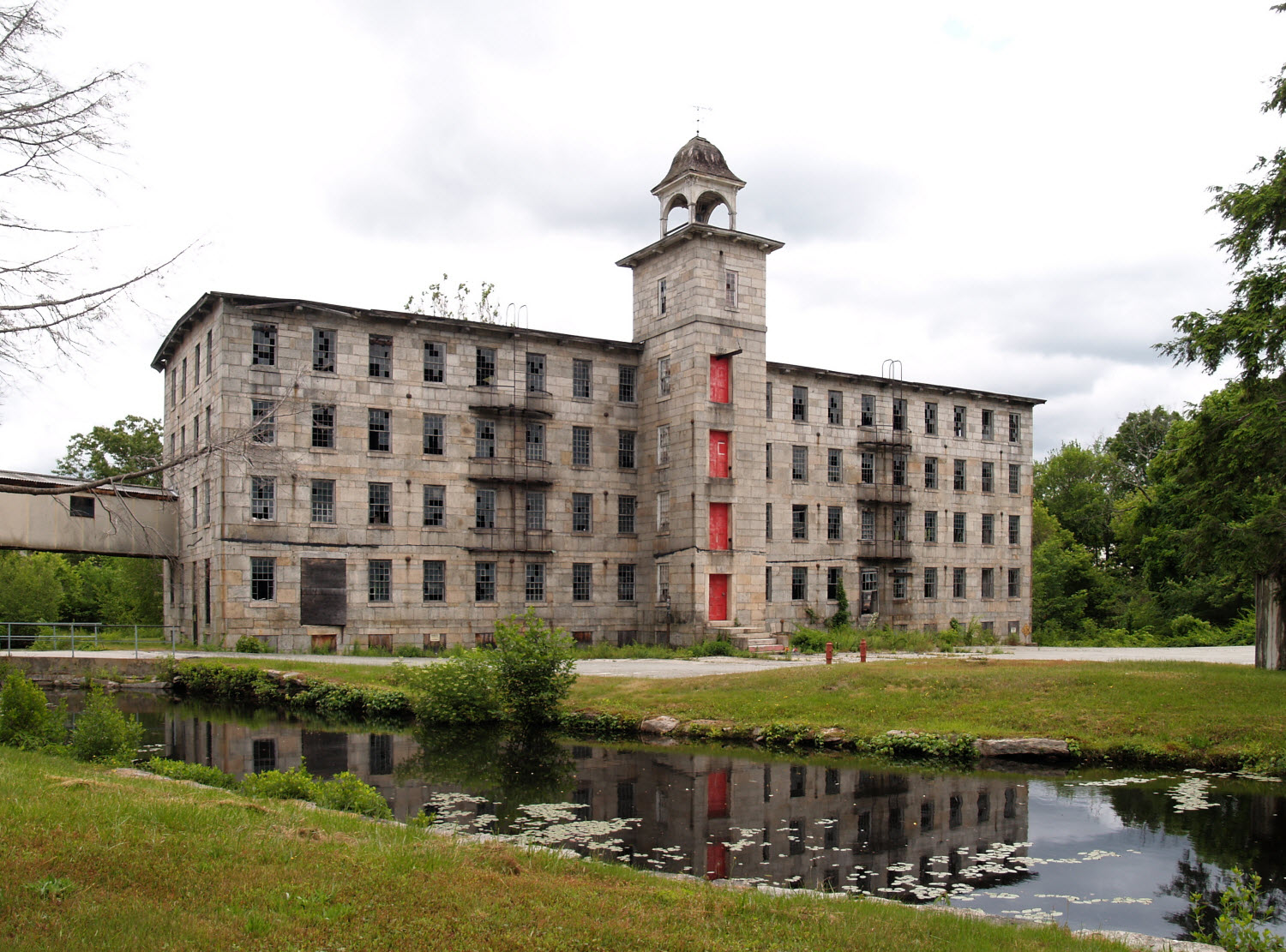
Slatersville Mill, 2005, prior to renovation

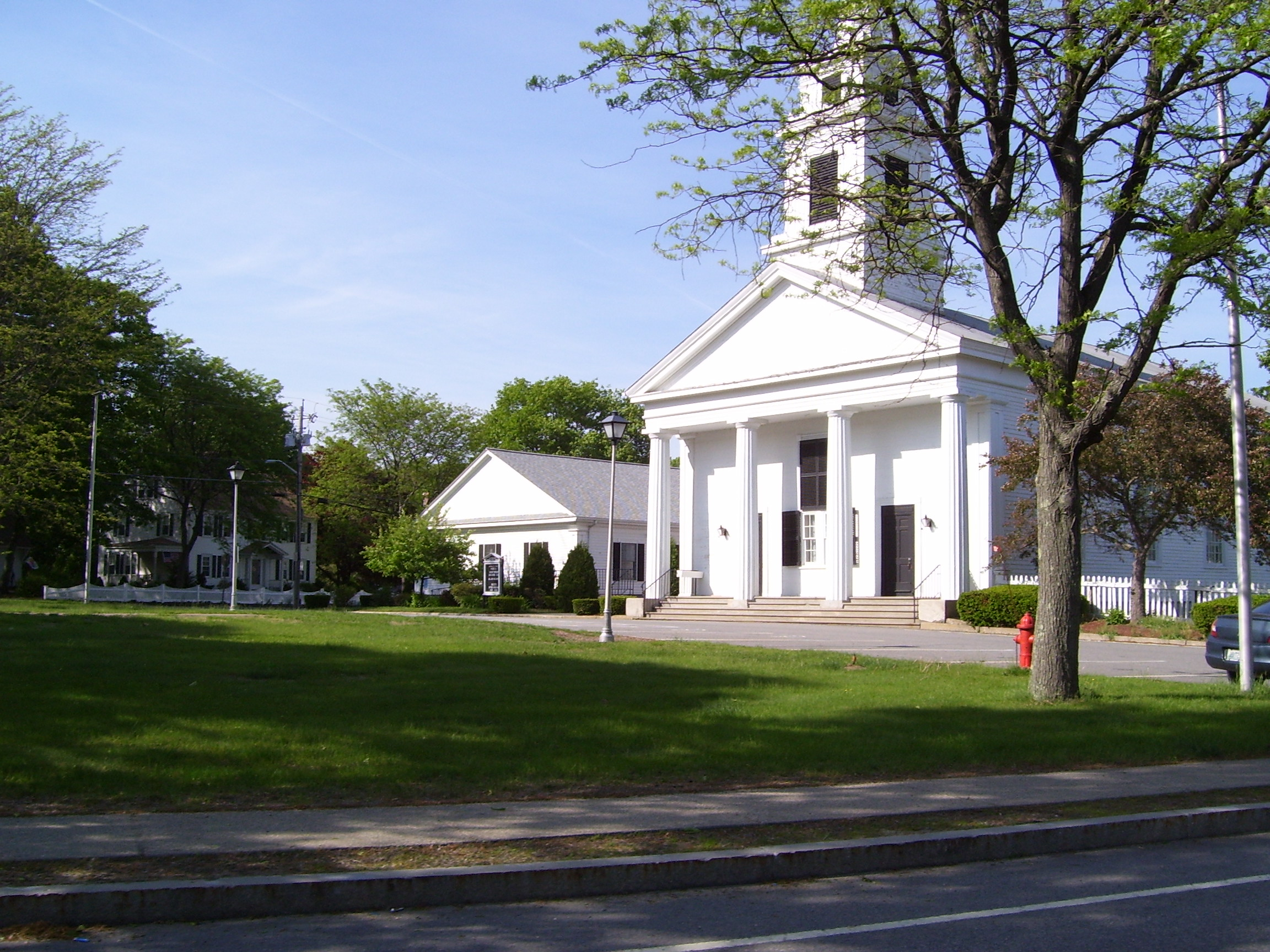
Slatersville Green and the Congregational Church meeting house which the Slaters donated and attended
