= Undercliff State Hospital =

Hospital in Connecticut, United States

Coordinates: 41.5512°N 72.8242°W

Undercliff State Hospital was a roughly 40-acre (16 ha) hospital situated on Undercliff Road, Meriden, Connecticut. It operated from 1910 to 1976. The hospital was first built under the name Meriden Sanatorium to serve children with tuberculosis, German measles, chickenpox, and smallpox, but began to accept adult patients in 1939. In the early 1920s, the site name was changed to Undercliff Sanatorium. In 1967, it was changed once again to Undercliff Mental Health Center.

The facility was decommissioned in 1976, with remaining patients being moved to cottages on the property. In 2004, the state changed the name to "Undercliff State Hospital" to be more appropriate for patients and residents. It remains open to the Connecticut Department of Developmental Services, the Department of Child and Family Services, various other state agencies and Connecticut State Police. There are several newly built DDS buildings that house mentally and physically disabled residents under the care of the state, DDS field offices, residential programs, day services programs, a respite center, and maintenance operations. Outlying cottages and houses serve more independent developmentally disabled adults, juvenile and adult sex offenders, and surplus police and military equipment.

Connecticut prohibits the public from accessing the grounds and recently removed the Undercliff Road sign. Police patrol the grounds and trespassing laws are enforced. A state police officer lives on the premises. The state is debating whether a portion of the property can be utilized for economic development to generate revenue to pay for city expenses. However Cliff House and the larger building at the top of the campus may be uninhabitable because of Americans with Disabilities Act of 1990 compliance issues. Demolition of the campus to make way for a juvenile courthouse began in October 2013. The recreation section of the Administration and Infirmary Building was demolished, followed by the rear portion of the hospital. Current plans for the other buildings, currently used for storage, are unknown.
