= Slater Memorial Museum =

- U.S. Historic district – Contributing property
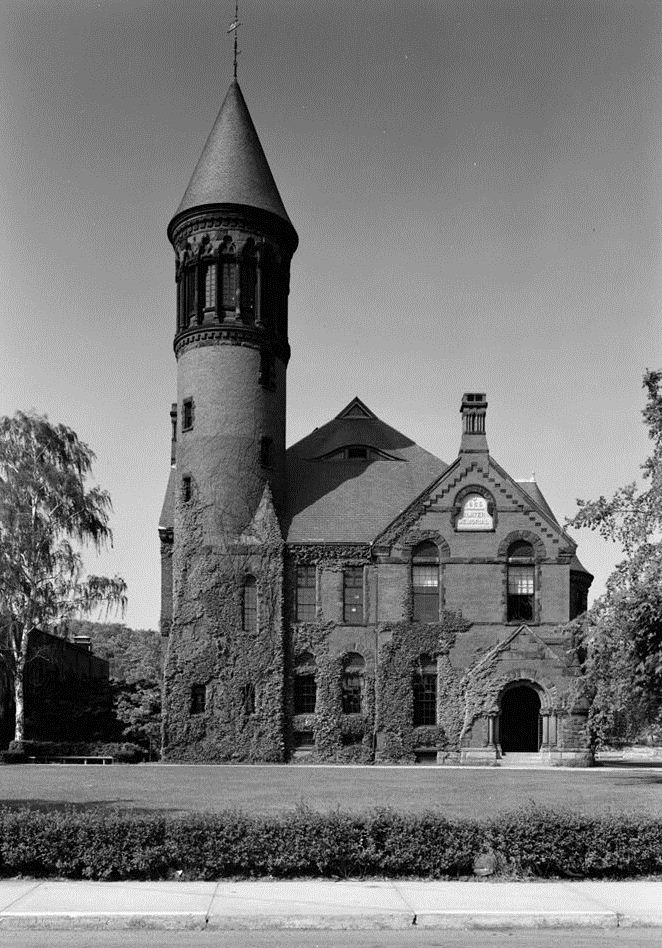
- The Slater Memorial Museum in 1958

- Location within Connecticut Location within the United States
- Location: 108 Crescent Street
- Coordinates: 41°32′1″N 72°4′55″W
- Built: 1885; dedicated 1886; opened 1888.
- Architect: Stephen C. Earle, Cudworth & Woodworth
- Architectural style: Richardsonian Romanesque
- Part of: Chelsea Parade Historic District (ID88003215)
- Added to NRHP: May 12, 1989

The Slater Memorial Museum is a historic building and art museum on the grounds of the Norwich Free Academy in Norwich, Connecticut, designed by the architect Stephen C. Earle. The building was begun in 1885, dedicated on November 4, 1886, and opened to the public in 1888. It was commissioned by the textile magnate William A. Slater in honor of his father, John Fox Slater (1815–1884). The building, constructed of brick and brownstone in the Richardsonian Romanesque style, with rusticated masonry, medieval decorative elements, and the lavish use of tiles and terracotta, is considered by some to be Earle's finest work. It is a contributing property in the Chelsea Parade Historic District in the National Park Service's National Register of Historic Places. The adjacent Converse Art Gallery, built in 1906, was designed by the firm of Cudworth & Woodworth.

The original museum collection consisted of 227 plaster casts of ancient Greek, Roman, Egyptian, and Renaissance sculpture, acquired in 1887–1888 with the assistance of Edward Robinson, the curator of classical antiquities at the Museum of Fine Arts in Boston. These are still displayed in the main hall of the building, and together represent one of the largest surviving collections of plaster casts in the United States. The original displays also included electrotype copies of ancient Greek coins and Renaissance medals, together with photographs of European art and architecture. The collection has since expanded to include colonial and local historic artifacts, American and European paintings and decorative arts, African and Oceanic sculpture, and Native American objects.

== See also ==
- John F. Slater House, 352 E. Main Street, Norwich, CT.
