= Willimantic Elks Club =

- U.S. National Register of Historic Places
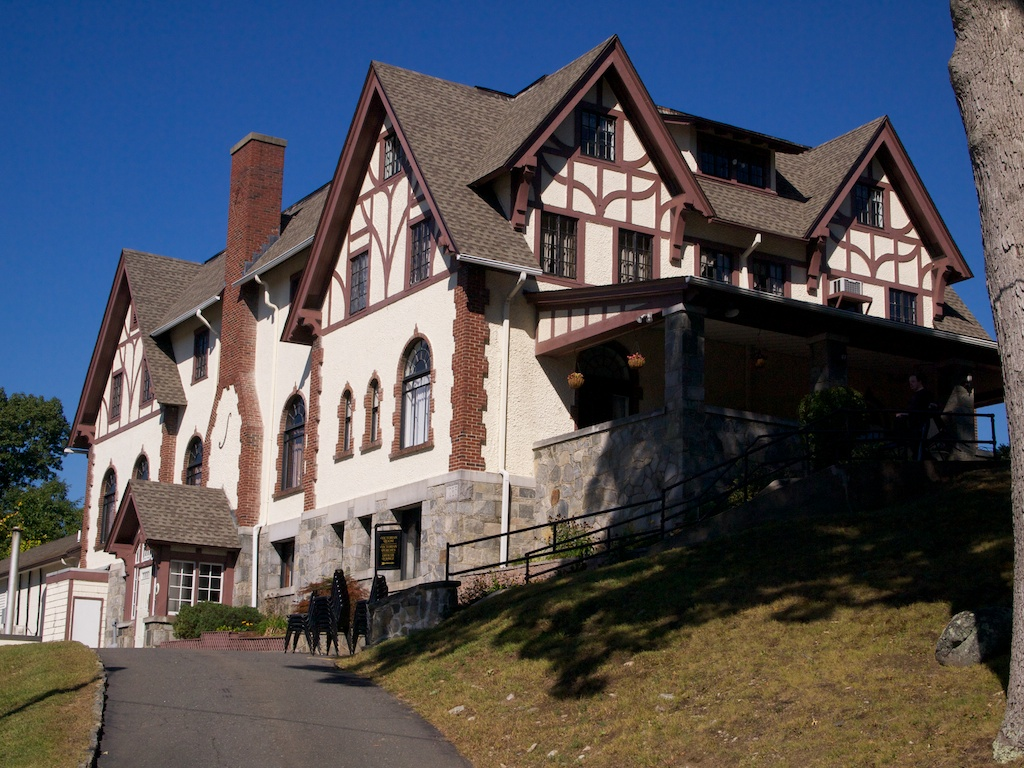

- Location within Connecticut Location within the United States
- Location: 198 Pleasant Street, Windham, Connecticut
- Coordinates: 41°42′34″N 72°12′47″W
- Area: 4.1 acres (1.7 ha)
- Built: 1925
- Built by: Doyle & Murphy
- Architect: Cudworth & Thompson
- Architectural style: Tudor Revival
- NRHP reference No.: 05001045
- Added to NRHP: September 21, 2005

The Willimantic Elks Club is a historic Elks lodge at 198 Pleasant Street in the Willimantic section of Windham, Connecticut. Built in 1925 for a lodge founded in 1914, it is one of the finest examples of Tudor Revival architecture in the region, and has been a major site of social events in the community since. The building was added to the National Register of Historic Places in 2005.

== Description and history ==
The Willimantic Elks Club is located in a residential area across the Willimantic River from downtown Willimantic, set on the south side of Pleasant Street between John Street and Lebanon Avenue It is a large 2-1/2 story building, with steel frame construction and a half-timber and stucco appearance characteristic of the Tudor Revival. The ground floor is finished in fieldstone, and the building corners are finished in brick quoining. A large addition lacks architectural notice, but is sited to minimize intrusion on the appearance of the original building. The interior of the building houses social and meeting spaces, built to dimensions specified by the national Elks organization at the time of its construction.

Willimantic's Elks lodge was established in 1914, and quickly became a major civic and business social center in the community. Its membership included a cross-section of the community's business leadership and was ethnically diverse, although only white men were originally allowed as members. The hall was built in 1925 and enlarged in 1957 to serve Elks functions. It is the area's finest example of Tudor Revival architecture.

== See also ==
- National Register of Historic Places listings in Windham County, Connecticut
