= Slater Library =

- Slater Library and Fanning Annex
- U.S. National Register of Historic Places
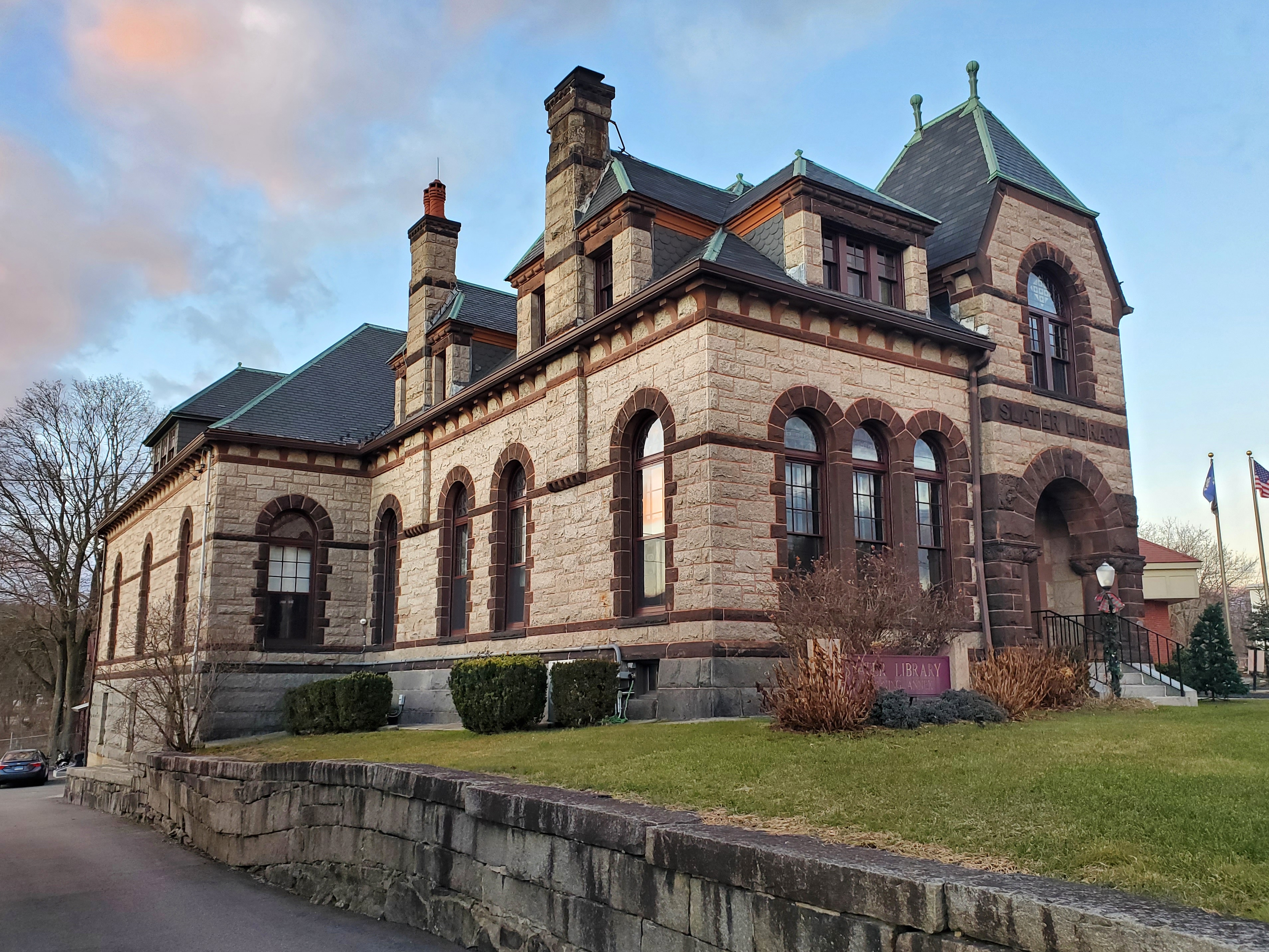
- Slater Library in December 2022

- Location within Connecticut Location within the United States
- Location: 26 Main Street, Griswold, Connecticut
- Coordinates: 41°36′17.8″N 71°59′03.2″W
- Area: less than one acre
- Built: 1884
- Architect: Stephen C. Earle; Cudworth & Thompson
- Architectural style: Romanesque
- NRHP reference No.: 01001529
- Added to NRHP: January 28, 2002

The Slater Library is the public library of Griswold, Connecticut. It is located in a historic building at 26 Main Street in the borough of Jewett City.

The Romanesque Revival building was constructed in 1884 with funds donated by John Fox Slater, a New England industrialist and philanthropist. The original building was designed by Stephen C. Earle, and was nearly doubled in size in 1930 with the addition of the Fanning Annex, designed by the Norwich firm of Cudworth & Thompson, and funded by a bequest from local businessman David Hale Fanning.

The building was added to the National Register of Historic Places in 2002.

== Architecture ==
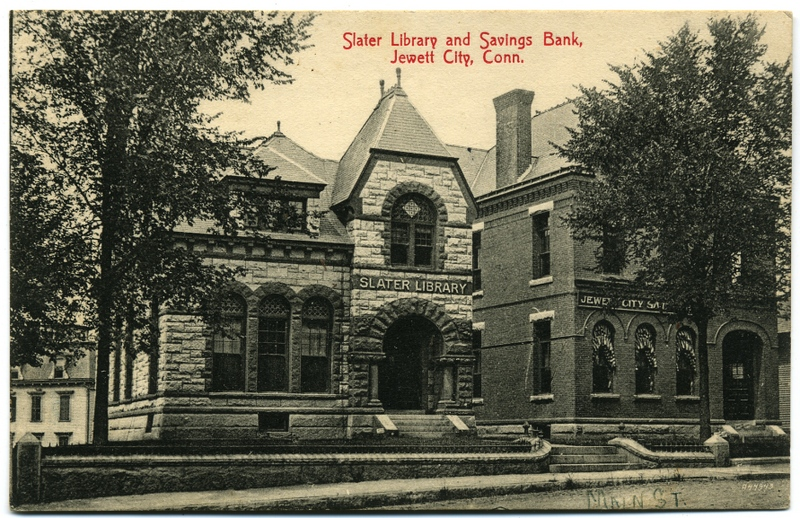
1908 postcard of the library

The library is a 1 1/2-story structure, built out of granite with brownstone trim, all finished with a rough quarry exterior. It is roughly rectangular in shape, with a projecting tower at the front right, and a hip roof from which hipped dormers project. The 1930 addition nearly doubles the size of the original building, and creates an L shape at the rear; it is built using similar materials. Most windows are set in rounded-arch openings with brownstone framing, with a brownstone stringcourse at the base of the arched section. Similar stringcourses and water tables also run below and at the base of the windows. The main entrance is set deeply recessed in the base of the tower.

== Griswold Historical Society Museum ==
The Griswold Historical Society Museum was previously located on the second floor of the Slater Library. The museum's displays illustrate life in New England during the 18th and 19th centuries, and are themed around a farmer's workshop, a kitchen, school and children's playthings. The museum has since moved down the road, to the Jewett City Municipal Center across from Dean's Corner Diner, building #2.

== See also ==
- National Register of Historic Places listings in New London County, Connecticut
