= Huntington Street Baptist Church =

Historic church in Connecticut, United States

- U.S. National Register of Historic Places
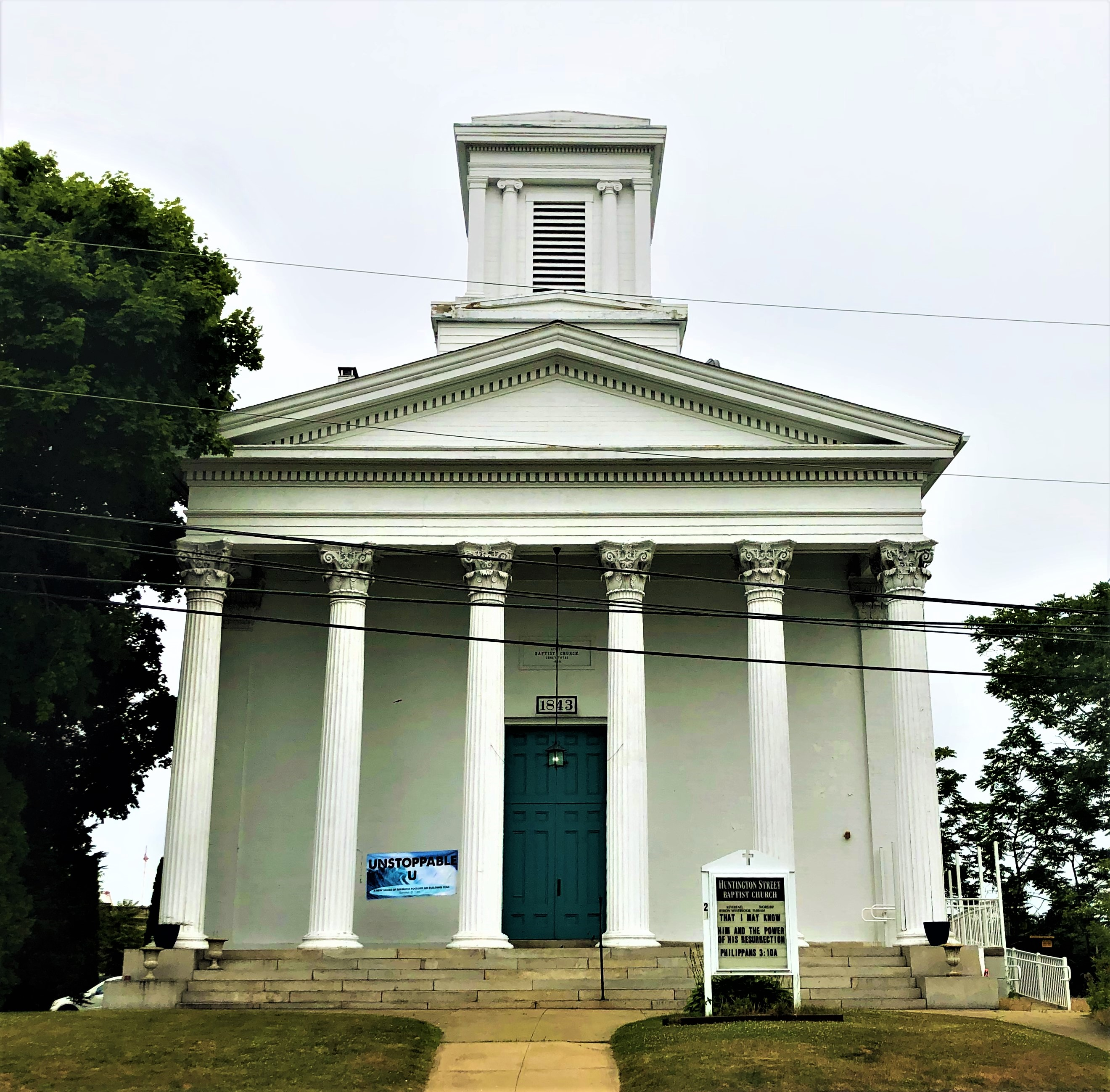
- (2022)

- Location within Connecticut Location within the United States
- Location: 29 Huntington Street, New London, Connecticut
- Coordinates: 41°21′12″N 72°5′57″W
- Area: 0.3 acres (0.12 ha)
- Built: 1843
- Architect: Bishop, John
- Architectural style: Greek Revival
- NRHP reference No.: 82004377
- Added to NRHP: April 12, 1982

The Huntington Street Baptist Church is a historic Baptist Church meeting house at 29 Huntington Street in New London, Connecticut. Built in 1843 by John Bishop, who also designed it, it is one of the last major examples of Greek Revival architecture to be built in the city. The church was built by a Universalist congregation and then purchased by a Baptist one. The building was listed on the National Register of Historic Places in 1982. As of 2017, the church is still in use as a Baptist house of worship.

== Architecture and history ==
The Huntington Street Baptist Church is located west of downtown New London, on the east side of Huntington Street south of Jay Street. It is prominently visible to the surrounding area, due to its siting on a large granite outcrop. It is a single-story brick structure, its exterior finished in stucco and covered by a gabled roof. The front facade is dominated by a projecting portico, which has six fluted Corinthian columns rising to an entablature and fully pedimented gable with dentil moulding. The facade behind the portico is plain except for the entrance at the center. A two-stage square tower rises above the portico. The interior retains many original Greek Revival details, many of which are based on close copies of designs published in pattern books by Minard Lafever.

The church's construction has its origin in a religious conflict within New London's Baptist congregations. During the 1830s, an increasing number of congregants, as well as at least one minister, began adopting Universalist views, which conservative elements within the Baptist leadership considered heresy. Jabez Swan, a fiery opponent of Universalism, led a revival in 1842 that prompted the Universalists to split. This church was built the following year, sited deliberately to have the highest church steeple in the city, and to overlook the city's Baptist churches. Its builder and designer was John Bishop, a member of the Universalist congregation. Bishop's design was inspired by The Beauties of Modern Architecture (1835) by Minard LaFever.

The cost of the church was an extreme burden on the Universalist congregation, and its members were unhappy with the preaching of the minister, Thomas Greenwood. They were forced to sell the building for $12,000 in 1849; the buyer was a new Baptist congregation led by Jabez Smith Swan, formed by members of the First Baptist Church. The church was rededicated on March 29, 1849.

== See also ==
- National Register of Historic Places listings in New London County, Connecticut
