= Sophia Augusta Brown Sherman =

American heiress and socialite

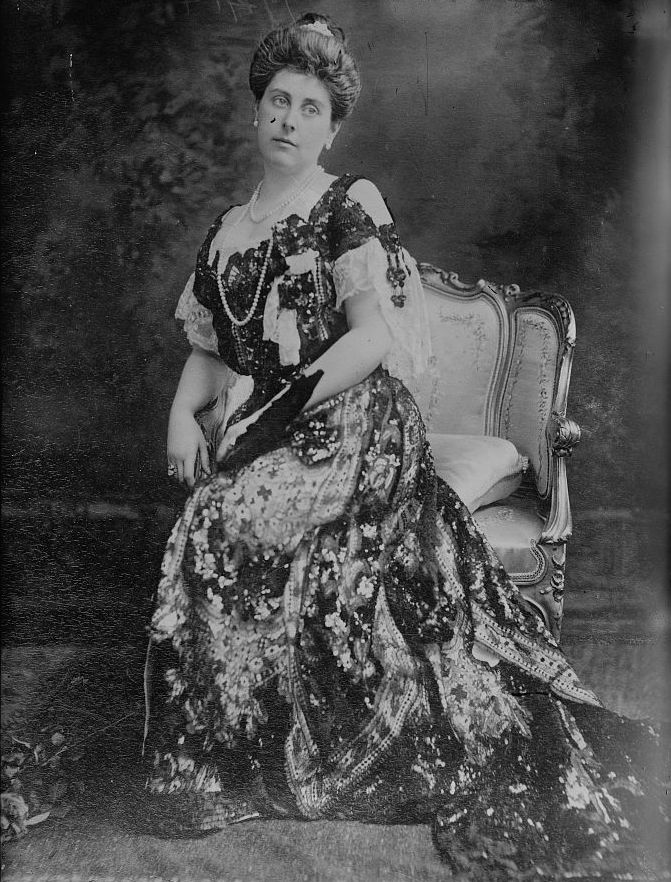
- Photograph of Mrs. Sherman, c. 1914
- Born: April 21, 1867; Providence, Rhode Island, U.S.
- Died: June 28, 1947 (aged 80); Newport, Rhode Island, U.S.
- Spouse: William Watts Sherman (m. 1885; died 1912)
- Children: Irene Muriel Augusta Sherman; Mildred Constance Sherman
- Parent(s): John Carter Brown; Sophia Augusta Browne Brown
- Relatives: John N. Brown (brother); Harold Brown (brother); Nicholas Brown Jr. (grandfather); John N. Brown II (nephew)

Sophia Augusta Brown Sherman (April 21, 1867 – June 28, 1947) was an American heiress and socialite who was prominent in New York and Newport society during the Gilded Age.

== Early life ==
Sophia was born on April 21, 1867, in Providence, Rhode Island. She was the only daughter and youngest of three children born to John Carter Brown and Sophia Augusta (née Browne) Brown (1825–1909), a descendant of Roger Williams, a president of the Colony of Rhode Island. Sophia had two older brothers, John Nicholas Brown I, who married Natalie Bayard Dresser (parents of John Nicholas Brown II, Asst. Secretary of the Navy), and Harold Brown, who married Sophia's stepdaughter, Georgette Wetmore Sherman, in 1892.

Reportedly, Sophia was favorite granddaughter of her paternal grandfather, Nicholas Brown Jr., the namesake patron of Brown University, and his wife, Ann (née Carter) Brown, daughter of John Carter, a prominent printer in Providence. Through her father, she was a descendant of Nicholas Brown Sr., brother of John Brown, Moses Brown, and Joseph Brown, all merchants who were active in Rhode Island politics and who brought the College of Rhode Island to Providence in 1771.

In 1874, when Sophia was only seven years old, her father died and left the bulk of his estate, besides a $50,000 (equivalent to $1,422,794 in 2025 dollars) donation to Brown University, to his children, including Sophia. Her mother later owned a cottage in Newport on Bellevue Avenue.

== Society life ==
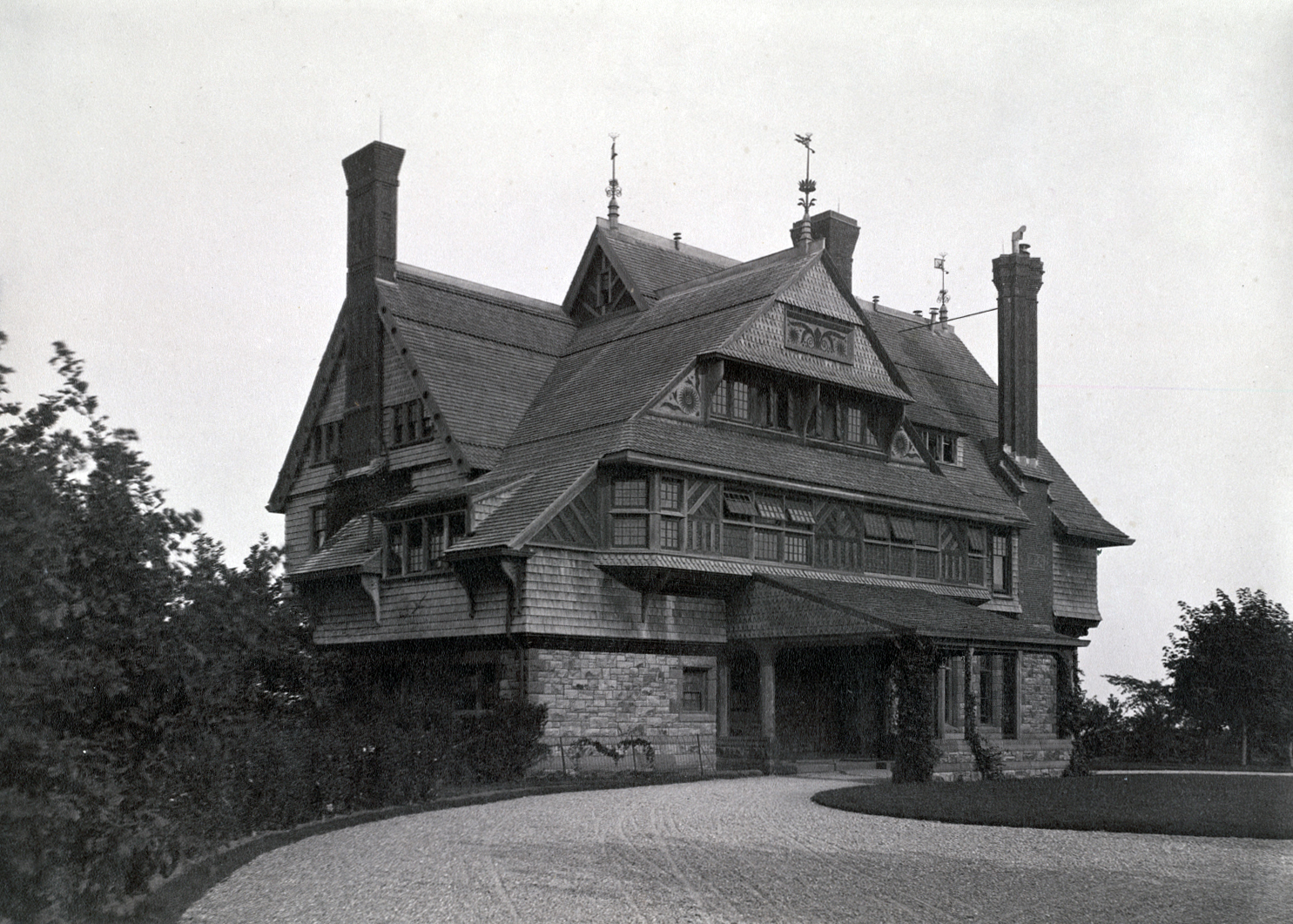
The Sherman Cottage in Newport, before Sophia's 1890 expansion.

In Newport, Sophia and her husband lived at 2 Shepard Avenue in Ochre Point (in the present day Bellevue Avenue Historic District), which was built between 1875 and 1876 by Sherman and his first wife. The Shingle Style home was designed by architect H. H. Richardson and was expanded and updated by Stanford White of McKim, Mead and White between 1879 and 1881. In 1890, Sophia hired Newport architect Dudley Newton for a second addition to add a ballroom and service wing.

As of May 1883, "Mrs. W. W. Sherman" was recorded as having an opera box on the Parterre level in the then-new New York Metropolitan Opera. Her box was on the same level as other society names of her day, two down from Jay Gould's box and across from the boxes of J.P. Morgan and Cornelius Vanderbilt. She was one of the only women with a box listed in her own name (albeit a name that obscured her given name and referenced her husband's name) rather than listed directly in a man's name.

In 1892, the Shermans, and her brother Harold, were included in Ward McAllister's "Four Hundred", purported to be an index of New York's best families, published in The New York Times. Conveniently, 400 was the number of people that could fit into Mrs. Astor's ballroom.

In 1901, Théobald Chartran, who also painted her husband William, painted a double portrait of her daughters, Irene and Mildred, "charmingly dressed in white with pink sashes and pink ribbons in their hair. The portrait, set in a garden with the sea in the background, is placed within a circle." In 1910, François Fleming painted an oil portrait of Sophia where her "elegantly coifed pompadour is topped by a coronet, and furs and jewelry add to her presence."

== Personal life ==
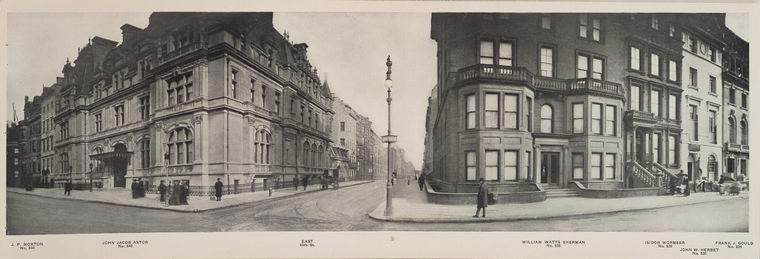
The Sherman Residence in New York City.

In 1885, after the death of his first wife in 1884, Sophia was married to William Watts Sherman (1842–1912). His first wife, Annie Derby Wetmore, was a daughter of William Shepard Wetmore and sister of Sen. George Peabody Wetmore. (Note: William had two daughters from his first marriage, Georgette Wetmore Sherman (1872–1960), who married Sophia's brother, Harold Brown, in 1892, and Sybil Katherine Sherman (1875–1954), who married John Ellis Hoffman in 1896. They divorced in May 1904, and in December 1904, she married Norrie Sellar (1872–1932), a prominent cotton broker who was the first cousin of A. Lanfear Norrie.) William trained as a physician but followed his father into the banking firm of Duncan, Sherman & Company. In 1892, her family hired Clinton & Russell to build them a New York residence at 838 Fifth Avenue across the street from 840 Fifth Avenue, the home of Mrs. Astor. It was a five-story, double-wide Italianate home set back on 65th Street. Together, William and Sophia had two daughters:

- Irene Muriel Augusta Sherman (1887–1972), who married Lawrence Lewis Gillespie (1876–1940), a son of Maj. Gen. George Gillespie Jr., in 1910.
- Mildred Constance Sherman (1888–1961), who married Ralph Stonor, 5th Baron Camoys (1884–1968) of Stonor Park in Oxfordshire, England, in 1911. They met at the 1911 Decies-Gould wedding. His younger brother, Edward Maurice Stonor, was married to Florence Rothschild in 1925.

Her husband died on January 22, 1912, at their home at 838 Fifth Avenue. He was buried in the Island Cemetery in Newport, Rhode Island. Sophia died in Newport on June 28, 1947, and was buried next to her husband at Island Cemetery.

=== Descendants ===
Through her eldest daughter, she was the grandmother of Eileen Sherman Gillespie (1915–2008), who became engaged to John Jacob Astor VI, but called off the wedding and, later, married banker John Jermain Slocum (a descendant of John Jermain) who was the Harvard roommate of David Rockefeller, and Phyllis Gillespie (1917–1972), who married Alan T. Schumacher, an investment banker; and Doris Beryl Gillespie (1921–1931), who died young.

Through her daughter, Lady Camomys, she was the grandmother of Ralph Robert Watts Sherman Stonor (1913–1976), who succeeded his father to the barony; the Honourable Pamela Sophia Nadine Stonor, (1917–2005) who married Lt. Col. Charles Pepys (a great-grandson of the 1st Earl of Cottenham) in 1941; and the Honourable Mildred Sophia Noreen Stonor (1922–2012), who married John Rozet Drexel III (a great-grandson of Anthony Joseph Drexel) in 1941, and was the mother of three children: Pamela Drexel, John Rozet Drexel IV (married to Mary Jacqueline Astor, daughter of John Jacob Astor VI), and Noreen Drexel.
