= Harold Brown (Rhode Island financier) =

American financier and philanthropist

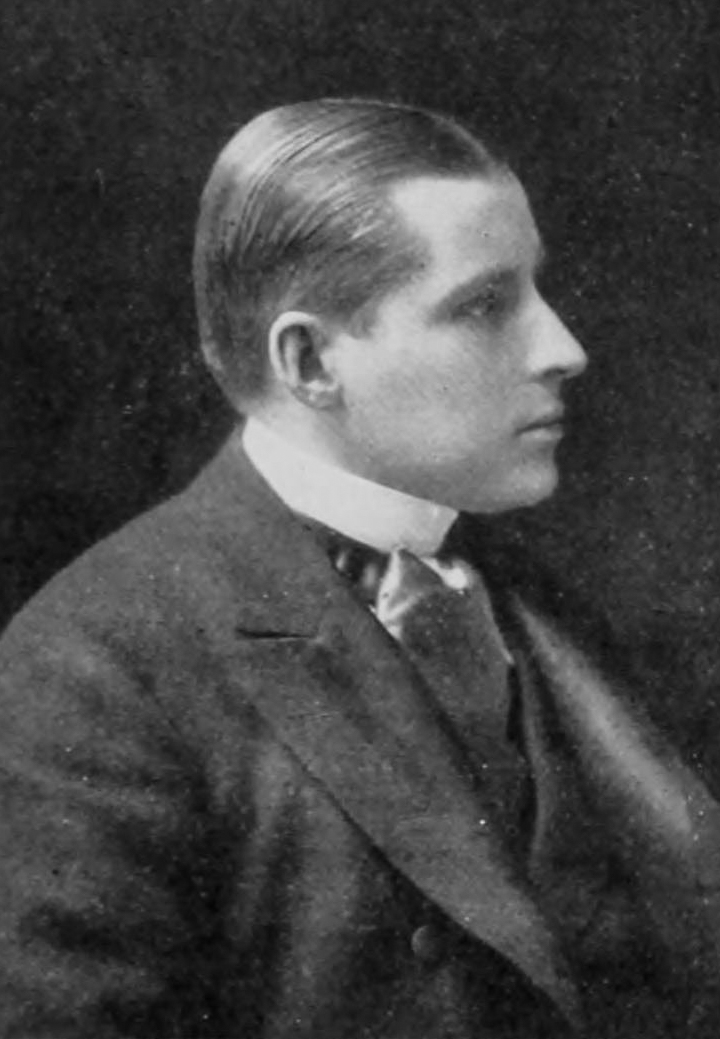
- Born: December 24, 1863; Providence, Rhode Island
- Died: May 10, 1900 (aged 36); New York City, New York
- Education: Brown University
- Employer: J.N. & H. Brown
- Spouse: Georgette Wetmore Sherman (m. 1892–1900)
- Parent(s): John Carter Brown I Sophia Augusta Browne
- Relatives: Nicholas Brown Jr. (grandfather); John Nicholas Brown I (brother); John Nicholas Brown II (nephew)

Harold Brown (December 24, 1863 – May 10, 1900) was an American financier and philanthropist who was prominent in New York society during the Gilded Age.

== Early life ==
Harold Brown was born on December 24, 1863, to John Carter Brown II (1797–1874) and Sophia Augusta Brown (1825–1909). His father was a collector of American books in the mid-19th century and was the first American to join the Hakluyt Society as a charter member in 1846, and in 1855, he was elected a member of the American Antiquarian Society. His older brother was John Nicholas Brown I (1863–1900), who married Natalie Bayard Dresser (1869–1950) (sister-in-law of George Washington Vanderbilt II), and his younger sister was Sophia Augusta Brown (1867–1947), who married William Watts Sherman (1842–1912). His brother donated his father's collection to Brown University.

=== Family ===
His paternal grandfather was Nicholas Brown Jr. (1769–1841), the namesake patron of Brown University (in 1804). His great-grandfather was Nicholas Brown Sr. (1729–1791), a merchant and slave trader who co-founded the College in the English Colony of Rhode Island and Providence Plantations. His great-grandfather was the brother of John Brown, Moses Brown, and Joseph Brown.

His nephew, John Nicholas Brown II (1900–1979), became the Assistant Secretary of the Navy and married Anne Seddon Kinsolving (1906–1985).

== Career ==
He prepared for college with private tutors, including William Carey Poland, and later enrolled at Brown University with the class of 1885. He left Brown a year later, instead deciding to continue his studies at home and abroad.

In 1888, Brown and his brother, John, formed a partnership, "J.N. & H. Brown." The brother's business was similar to the activities of the family business, Brown & Ives, where they lent funds for mortgages and invested in buildings and lands out west. In their business dealings, Harold and John relied upon George W. R. Matteson, the trustee of their father's estate for advice and assistance.

=== Society life ===
In 1892, Brown was included in Ward McAllister's "Four Hundred", purported to be an index of New York's best families led by Mrs. Astor, as published in The New York Times. Conveniently, 400 was the number of people that could fit into Mrs. Astor's ballroom.

Brown and his wife owned a home in Newport, Rhode Island on Bellevue Avenue and Hazard Street, and lived at 382 Fifth Avenue in New York City. He was a member of the Metropolitan Club, the Knickerbocker Club, the Union League Club, the Grolier Club, and the Society of Colonial Wars.

== Personal life ==
On October 4, 1892, Brown was married to Georgette Wetmore Sherman (1872–1960), the daughter of Annie Derby Rogers (née Wetmore) and William Watts Sherman (1842–1912), a businessman and the treasurer of the Newport Casino who was married to Brown's younger sister in 1885. She was also the niece of Sen. George Peabody Wetmore.

On May 1, 1900, his brother died of typhoid fever. After hearing of his brother's death, Harold immediately headed home from a trip in Europe with his wife, only to himself die a few days, aged 36, later upon his return to America. He died at the Hotel Netherland in New York City. Both Harold and his brother willed their estates to his nephew, who became the heir of his family's fortune and was referred to as the richest child in the world at the time. His widow continued to live in Newport, until her death in 1960.
