= John Nicholas Brown =

John Nicholas Brown may refer to:

- John Nicholas Brown I (1861–1900), American book collector
- John Nicholas Brown II (1900–1979), United States Assistant Secretary of the Navy
