= Nicholas Brown III =

American politician

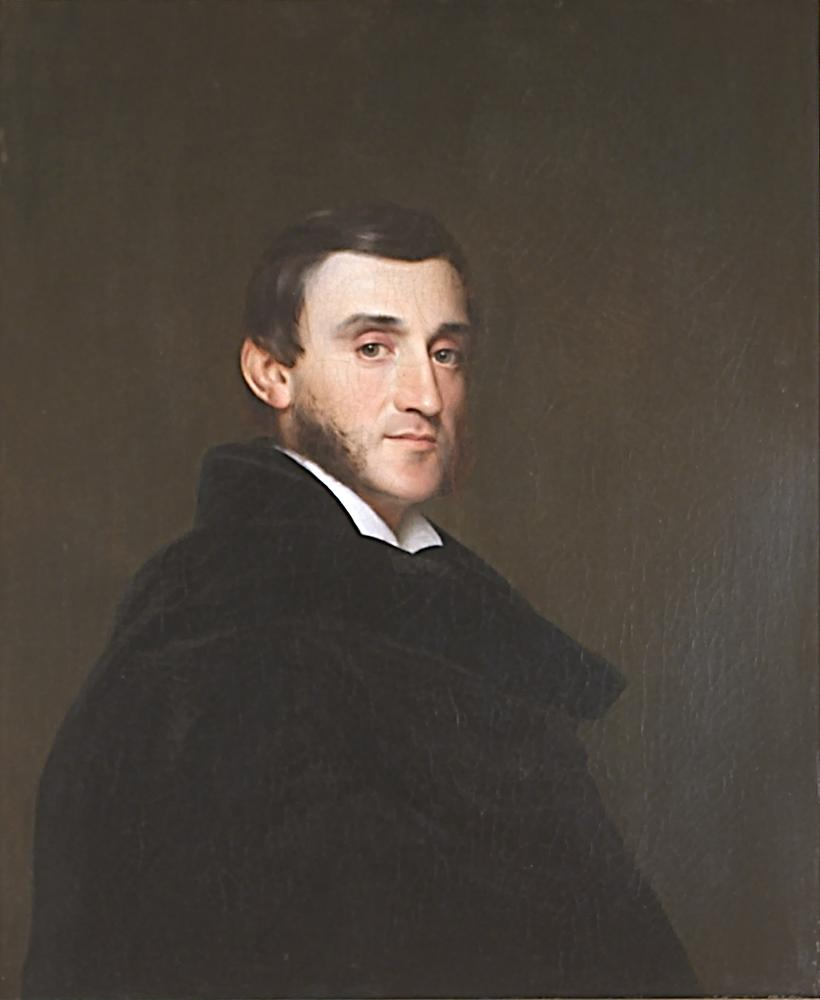
- Nicholas Brown, painted by Charles Cromwell Ingham

Lieutenant Governor of Rhode Island
- In office 1856–1857
- Governor: William W. Hoppin
- Preceded by: Anderson C. Rose
- Succeeded by: Thomas G. Turner

Personal details
- Born: Nicholas Brown III; October 2, 1792 Providence, Rhode Island, U.S.
- Died: March 2, 1859 (aged 66) Providence, Rhode Island, U.S.
- Spouse(s): Abby Mason; Caroline Matilda Clements
- Children: 5
- Parent(s): Nicholas Brown Jr. Ann Carter
- Relatives: John Carter Brown II (brother); Nicholas Brown Sr. (grandfather)
- Education: Brown University (1811); Litchfield Law School

Nicholas Brown III (October 2, 1792 – March 2, 1859) was the United States Consul to the Papal court from 1845 to 1853 and later was Lieutenant Governor of Rhode Island from 1856 to 1857, serving under Governor W. W. Hoppin.

== Early life ==
Nicholas Brown III was born on October 2, 1792, in Providence, Rhode Island, the eldest of three surviving children born to Nicholas Brown Jr. (1769–1841), the namesake patron of Brown University, and Ann Carter, daughter of John Carter, a prominent printer in Providence. His younger brother was John Carter Brown II (1797–1874). His grandfather was Nicholas Brown Sr. (1729–1791), brother of John Brown, Moses Brown, and Joseph Brown, who was a merchant and slave trader who co-founded the College in the English Colony of Rhode Island and Providence Plantations which is today known as Brown University.

He graduated from Brown University, which was founded by his family, in 1811 and attended the Litchfield Law School.

Nicholas Brown III died on March 2, 1859.

== Career ==
From 1845 to 1853, he was the United States Consul to the Papal court. From 1856 to 1857, he served as Lieutenant Governor of Rhode Island, serving under Governor W. W. Hoppin.

== Personal life ==
In 1820, Nicholas married his cousin, Abby Mason (1800–1822), daughter of James Brown Mason. After her death, he married Caroline Matilda Clements (1809–1879) in 1831. They had five children, including:

- Alfred Nicholas Brown (1832–1864), who married Anne Mauran in 1857. Of their three children, only Nicholas Brown (1862–1891) lived to adulthood.
- Annmary Brown Hawkins (1837–1903), in whose memory the Annmary Brown Memorial at Brown University was dedicated, and where she was laid to rest.
- Carrie Mathilde Brown Bajnotti, (1841–1892) whose husband, Italian diplomat Paul Bajnotti, erected a series of memorials after her death: the Bajnotti Memorial Fountain in Burnside Park, the Pancratiast Statue in Roger Williams Park, and Carrie Tower, the clock tower at Brown University.

Political offices
Preceded by Anderson C. Rose	Lieutenant Governor of Rhode Island; 1856–1857	Succeeded by Thomas G. Turner
