= William Watts Sherman =

American businessman

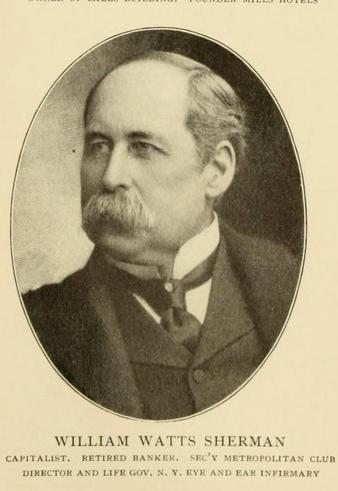
- Born: August 4, 1842; Albany, New York
- Died: January 22, 1912 (aged 69); New York, New York
- Occupation: Businessman
- Known for: Treasurer of Newport Casino
- Spouses: Annie Derby Rogers Wetmore (m. 1871; died 1884) Sophia Augusta Brown (m. 1885)
- Children: 4
- Parent(s): Watts Sherman; Sarah Maria Gibson
- Relatives: George Peabody Wetmore (brother-in-law); Sherman Stonor, 6th Baron Camoys (grandson)

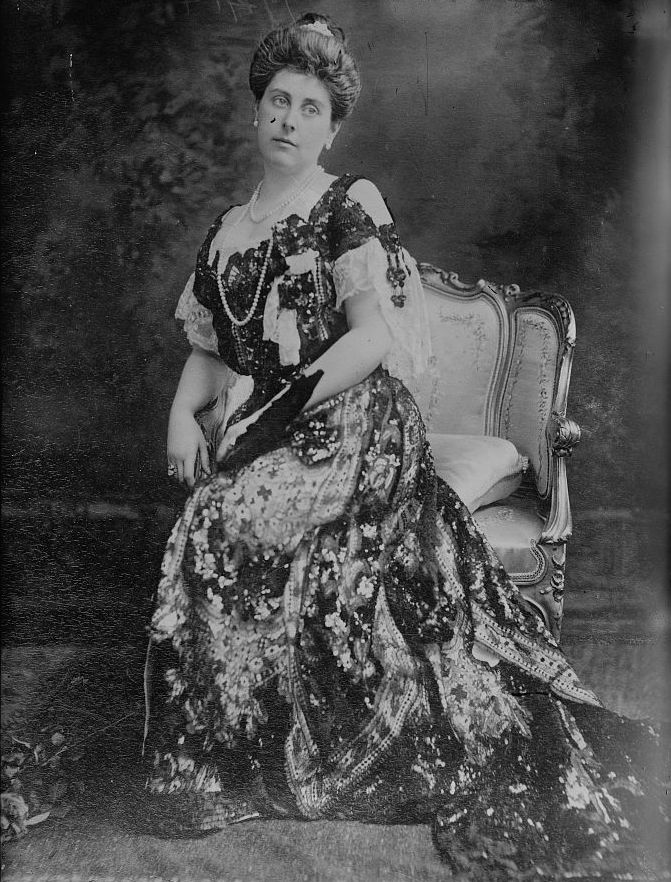
Sophia Augusta Brown, Sherman's second wife and widow, circa 1914

William Watts Sherman (August 4, 1842 – January 22, 1912) was a New York City businessman and the treasurer of the Newport Casino. In 1875–1876 he had the William Watts Sherman House constructed in Newport, Rhode Island.

== Early life ==
William Watts Sherman was born on August 4, 1842, in Albany, New York, to Watts Sherman (c. 1820–1865) and Sarah Maria Gibson.

== Career ==
William Watts Sherman trained as a physician but followed his father into the banking firm Duncan, Sherman & Company. In 1875 to 1876 he built the William Watts Sherman House in Newport, Rhode Island, which is a National Historic Landmark due to its architectural significance.

He was a presidential elector from Rhode Island for President Theodore Roosevelt in 1904.

Sherman belonged to several patriotic and hereditary societies. In 1905, he was admitted as an honorary member of the Rhode Island Society of the Cincinnati. He was also a charter member of the Rhode Island Society of the Sons of the Revolution in 1896 (membership number 1) and served as its first president until 1903. He was also a charter member of the Rhode Island Society of Colonial Wars in 1897 and a member of the Saint Nicholas Society of the City of New York.

Sherman was a member of several social clubs including the Knickerbocker Club, Metropolitan Club, Century Club, City Club, and the National Arts Club.

== Personal life ==
On July 7, 1871, he married Annie Derby Rogers Wetmore (1848–1884), daughter of William Shepard Wetmore (1801–1862) and sister of Sen. George Peabody Wetmore (1846–1921). Before Annie's death of pneumonia in 1884, they had two daughters:

- Georgette Wetmore Sherman (1872–1960), who married Harold Brown (1863–1900), the son of John Carter Brown II (1797–1874) in 1892.
- Sybil Katherine Sherman (1875–1954), who married John Ellis Hoffman in 1896. They divorced in 1904 and in 1905, she married Norrie Sellar (1872–1932), a prominent cotton broker who was a grandson of Adam Norrie.

In 1885, he married Sophia Augusta Brown (1867–1947), daughter of John Carter Brown II (1797–1874) and granddaughter of Nicholas Brown, Jr., the namesake of Brown University. Sophia's brother later married Sherman's eldest daughter, Georgette. Their other brother was John Nicholas Brown I (1861–1900). Together, William and Sophia had two daughters:

- Irene Muriel Augusta Sherman (1887–1969), who married Lawrence Lewis Gillespie (1876–1946).
- Mildred Constance Sherman (1888–1961), who married Ralph Stonor, 5th Baron Camoys (1884–1968).

William Watts Sherman died on January 22, 1912, at his home at 838 Fifth Avenue. He was buried in the Island Cemetery in Newport, Rhode Island.
