= William Watts Sherman House =

Historic house in Rhode Island, United States

- U.S. National Register of Historic Places
- U.S. National Historic Landmark
- U.S. National Historic Landmark District – Contributing property
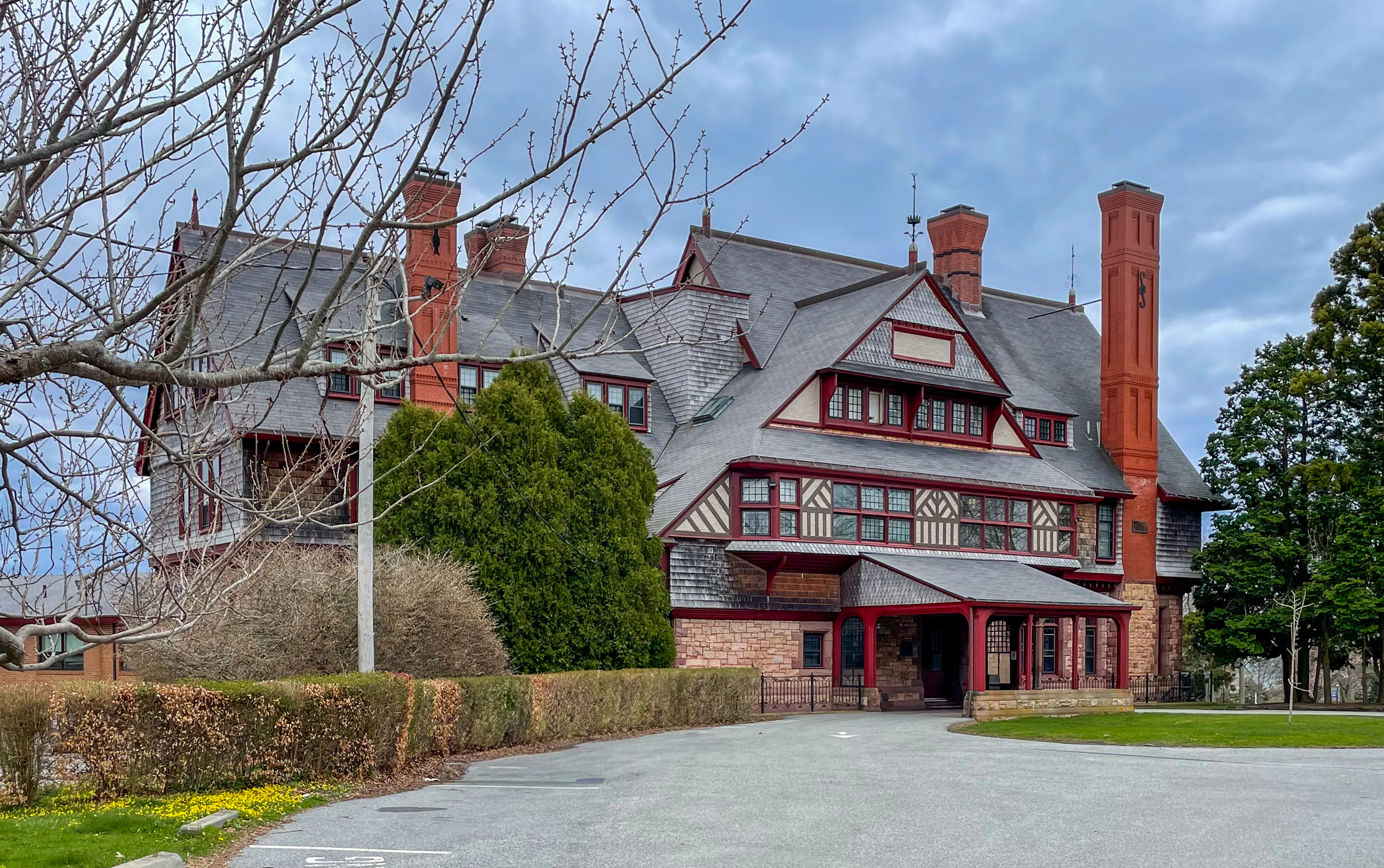
- William Watts Sherman House, west facade

- Location within Rhode Island Location within the United States
- Location: Newport, Rhode Island
- Coordinates: 41°28′12″N 71°18′18″W
- Built: 1875
- Architect: Henry Hobson Richardson
- Architectural style: Queen Anne
- Part of: Bellevue Avenue Historic District (ID72000023)
- NRHP reference No.: 70000015

Significant dates
- Added to NRHP: December 30, 1970
- Designated NHL: December 30, 1970
- Designated NHLDCP: December 8, 1972

The William Watts Sherman House is a notable house designed by American architect H. H. Richardson, with later interiors by Stanford White. It is a National Historic Landmark, generally acknowledged as one of Richardson's masterpieces and the prototype for what became known as the Shingle Style in American architecture. It is located at 2 Shepard Avenue, Newport, Rhode Island and is now owned by Salve Regina University. It is a contributing property to the Bellevue Avenue Historic District.

== History ==
The house was built in 1875–1876 for William Watts Sherman, of the banking firm Duncan Sherman & Co. of New York, and his first wife Annie Derby Rodgers Wetmore (daughter of William Shepard Wetmore of the nearby Chateau-sur-Mer). It was designed by the architectural firm of Gambrill and Richardson, though there is no evidence of Gambrill's involvement in the design, and built by the Norcross Brothers. According to an article in the Newport Mercury (January 9, 1875), its frame was constructed in New Jersey and shipped to Newport for assembly.

The original house was 2 1/2 stories in height and basically rectangular, about 53 by 81 feet (16 by 25 m) in dimensions, with porte-cochere on the east facade, and two principal entrances on the west. Its first story was faced in pink granite ashlar, with higher stories of brick, shingle, and half-timbered stucco, diamond-panel windows grouped in long, horizontal bands, and five massive red brick chimneys. Trim materials included reddish sandstone and brownstone. The roof was steeply gabled, with a broad single gable in front and multiple sharp gables to the rear, all originally shingled in wood. Its interior organizes clusters of rooms about a spacious central stair hall. Circa 1877 unusual stained-glass windows by Daniel Cottier (but often credited to John LaFarge) were added; these have subsequently been sold.

== Alterations ==
This original design was extended and altered, 1879–1881, by McKim, Mead and White in a style consonant with earlier work; the parlor and library were designed by Stanford White. A second addition by Newport architect Dudley Newton (1845–1907), circa 1890, added a ballroom and service wing. The house remained in private hands until 1951 when it was willed to the Baptist Home of Rhode Island as a home for the aged. In 1963 a hospital wing was added, and in 1982 it was acquired by Salve Regina.

The house combines elements from medieval European, Renaissance English and Colonial American styles, and appears to have been inspired by British architect Norman Shaw's houses in Surrey (published in 1874). According to the Newport Mercury, its builders had been "unable to find a name" for the house's architectural style, although the family termed it Queen Anne style.

On December 30, 1970, the house was designated a National Historic Landmark by the Department of the Interior.

== Gallery ==
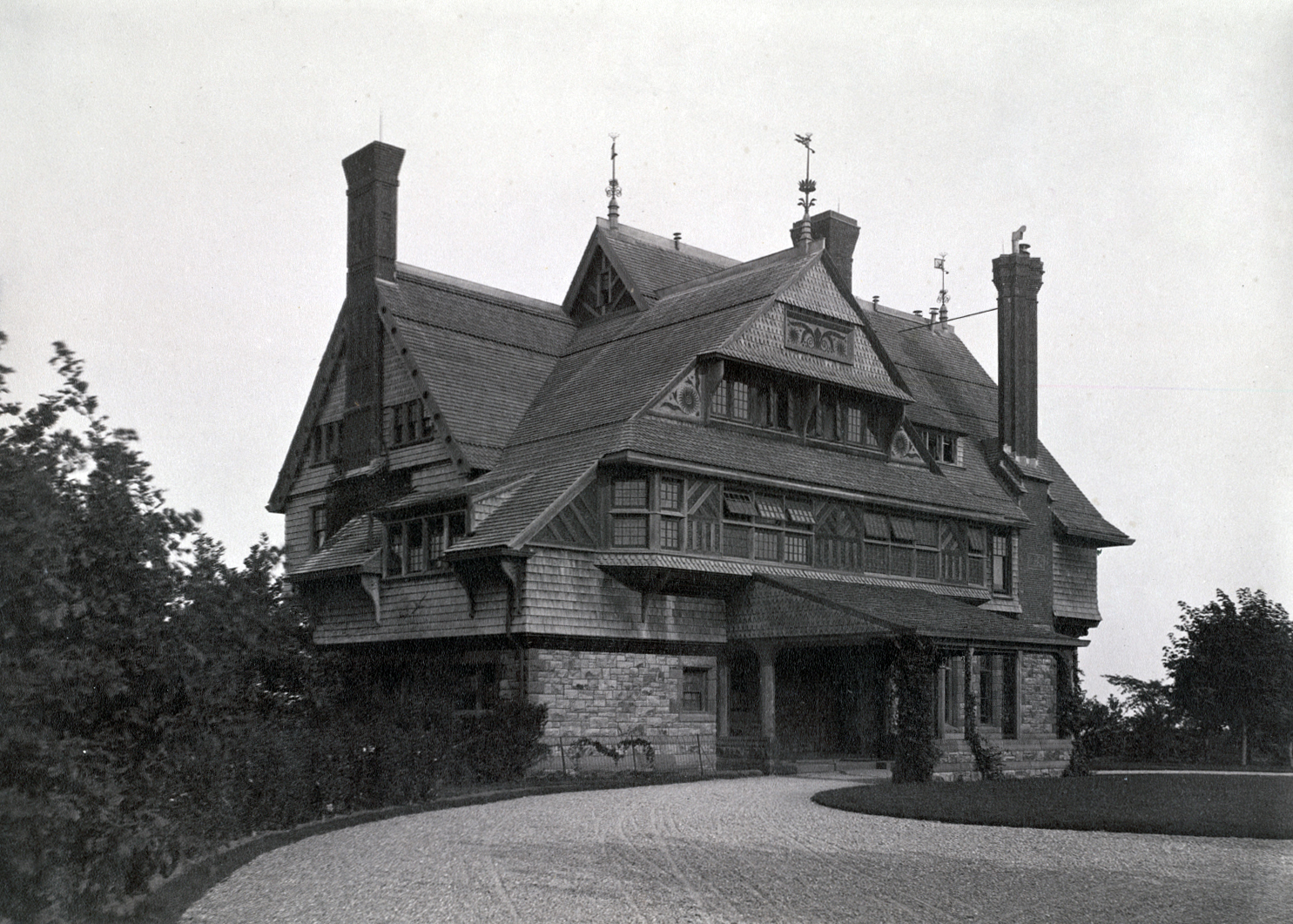
Watts Sherman House, before 1879 alterations.

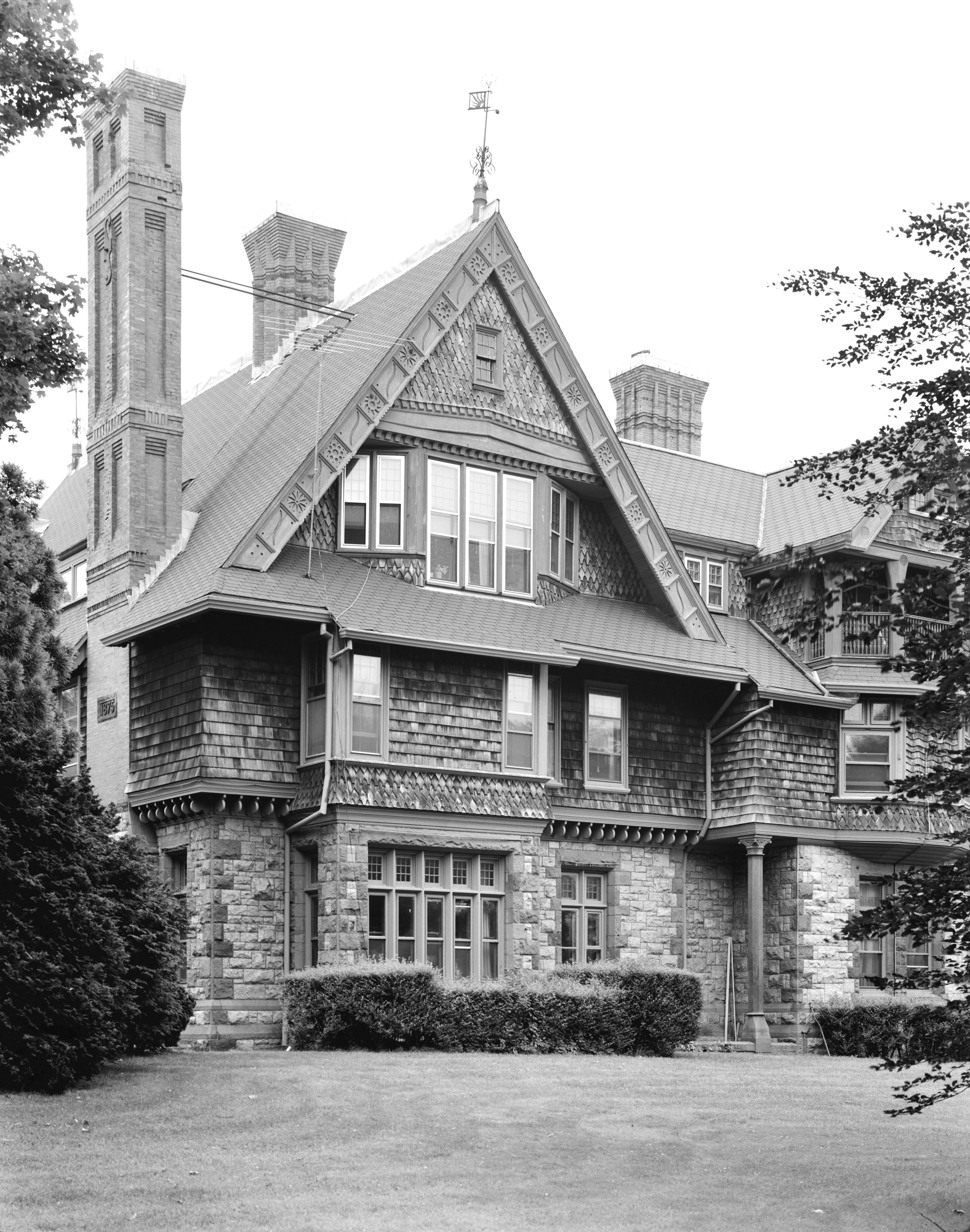
From the southeast.

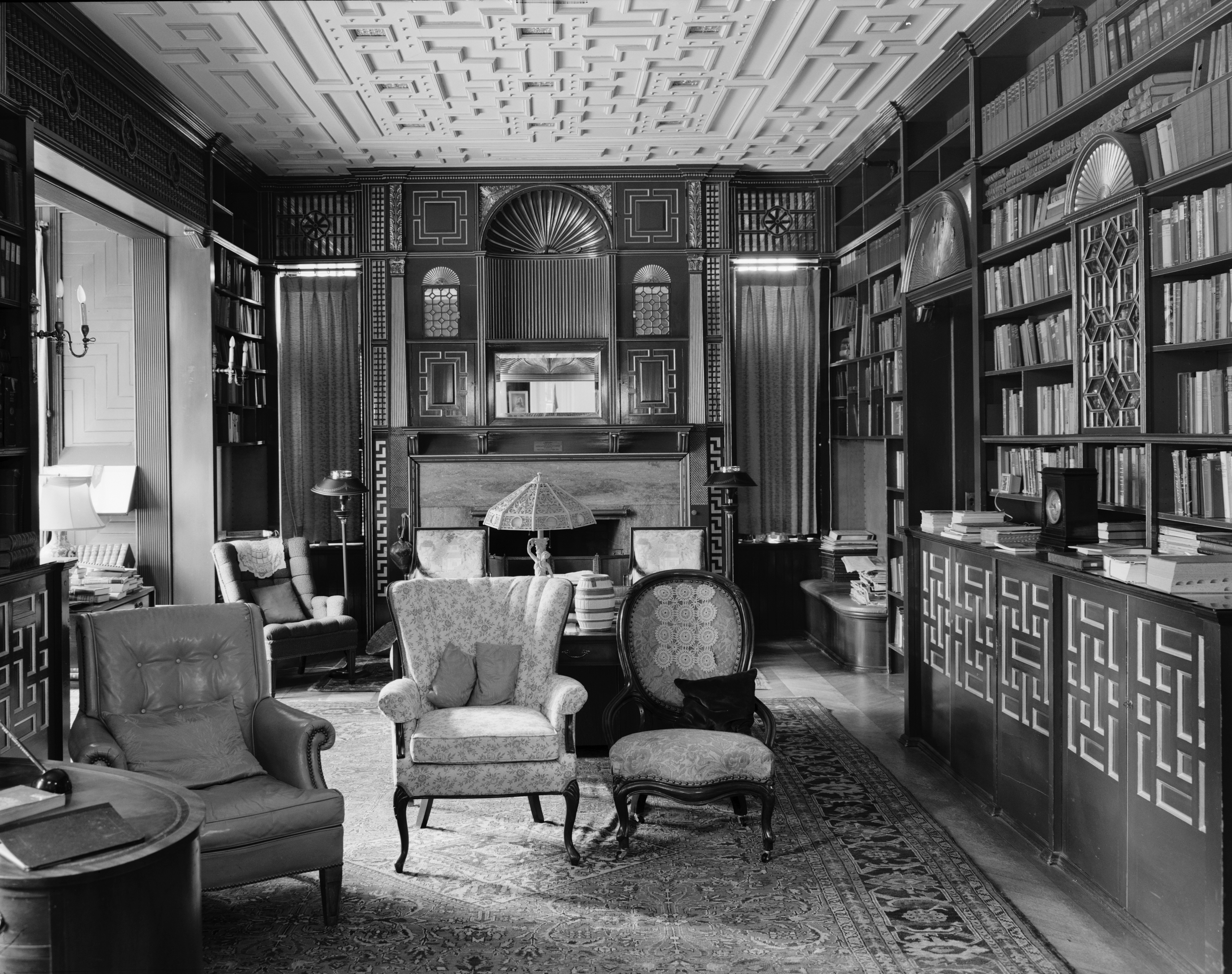
Library, by Stanford White.

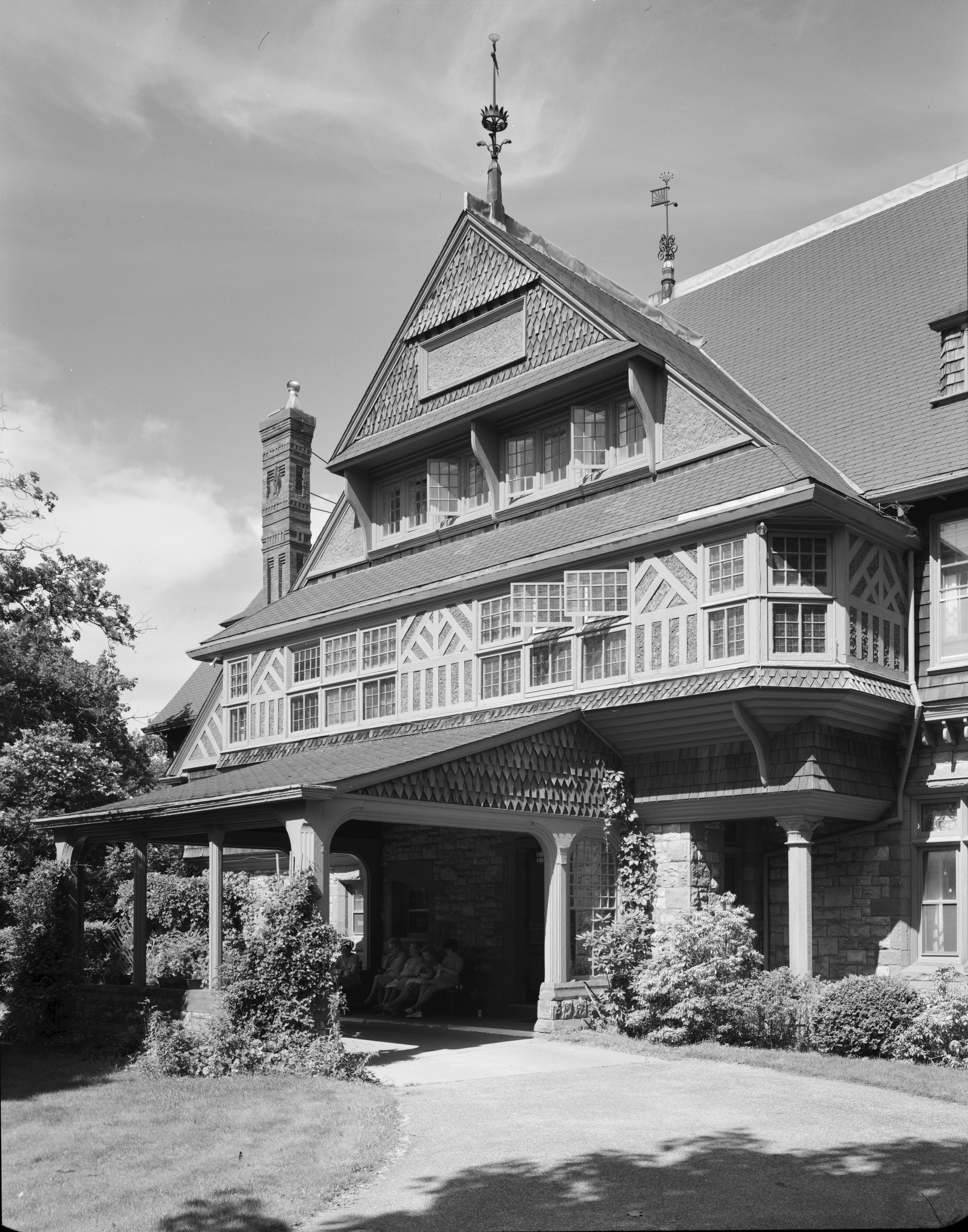
West facade

== See also ==
- List of National Historic Landmarks in Rhode Island
- National Register of Historic Places listings in Newport County, Rhode Island
