= William Carey Poland =

American educator and university president (1846–1929)

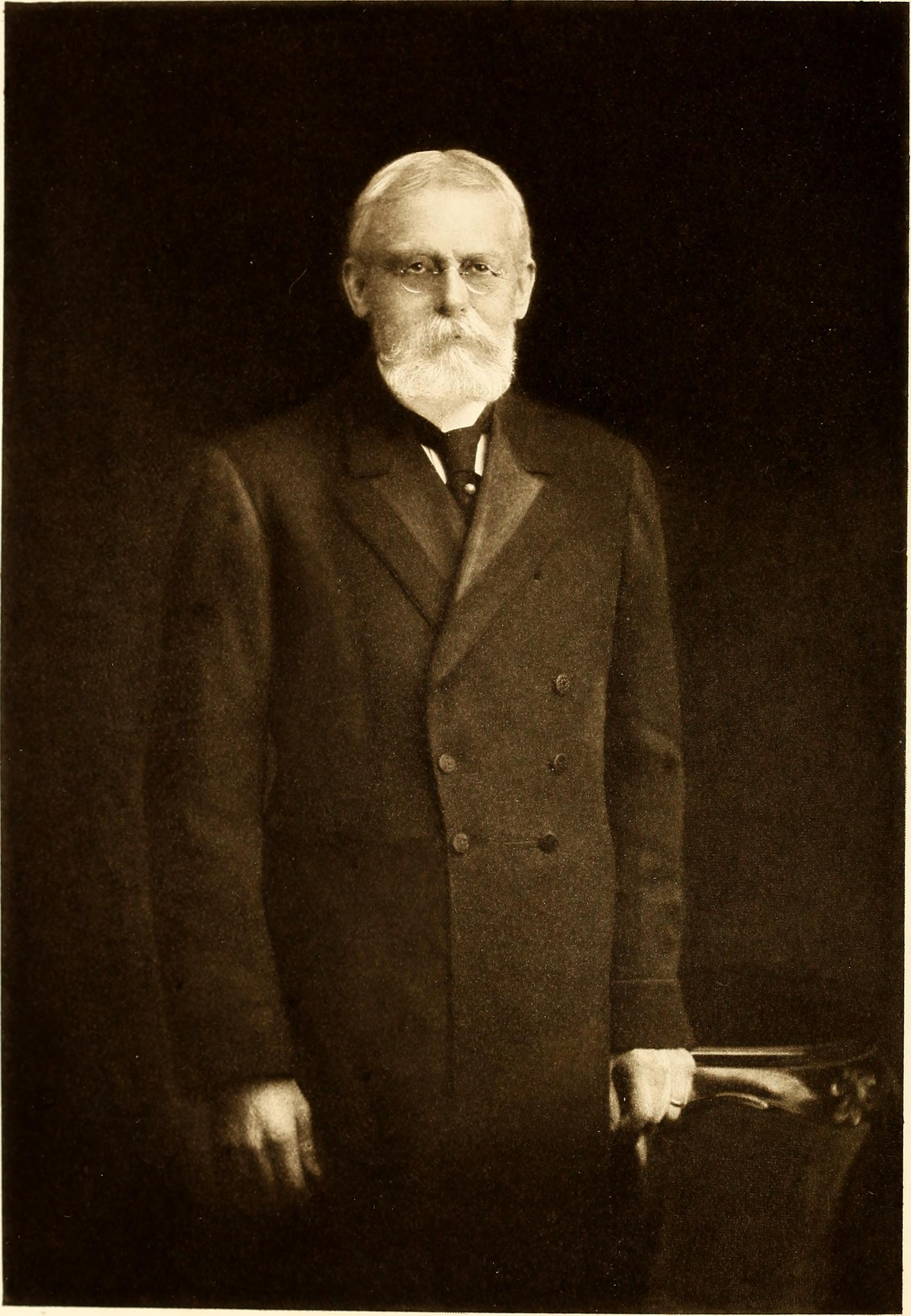
- Photo c. 1910

5th President of the Rhode Island School of Design
- In office 1896–1907
- Preceded by: Herbert W. Ladd
- Succeeded by: Isaac Comstock Bates

Personal details
- Born: January 25, 1846 Goffstown, New Hampshire, U.S.
- Died: March 19, 1929 (aged 83) Providence, Rhode Island, U.S.
- Resting place: Swan Point Cemetery
- Spouse: Clara Harkness
- Children: 3
- Education: Brown University
- Occupation: Classical scholar, educator, academic administrator, former university president

William Carey Poland (1846–1929) was an American classical scholar, educator, academic administrator, and former university president. He was Professor Emeritus at Brown University starting in 1915; and the President of Rhode Island School of Design from 1896 to 1907.

== Biography ==
William Carey Poland was born on January 25, 1846, in Goffstown, New Hampshire. His father was Baptist minister James Willey Poland. When he was fourteen, his family moved to Melrose, Massachusetts. He graduated from Melrose High School and received an A.B. degree and an M.A. degrees from Brown University in 1868.

After graduating, Poland became the principal of the Worcester Academy in Worcester, Massachusetts. He taught Greek and Latin at Brown University from 1870 to 1890 and taught art history from 1892 to 1915. In 1878, he worked as a private tutor for John Carter Brown's two sons to prepare them for college. Brown's sons John and Harold traveled with Poland to Berlin, Paris, and Cannes to study classics. He served as the director of the American School of Classical Studies at Athens in 1891. When he retired in 1915, he was made Professor Emeritus of Art History.

He was the fifth president of the Rhode Island School of Design (RISD), serving from 1896 to 1907. During his time at RISD, the school acquired Memorial Hall on Benefit Street (in 1903), marking the school's physical expansion beyond a single building.

Poland was married to Clara (née Harkness), daughter of Albert Harkness, and together they had three sons.
