= John Nicholas Brown I =

American book collector (1861–1900)

John Nicholas Brown
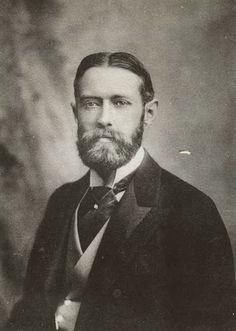
- Born: December 17, 1861; Providence, Rhode Island, U.S.
- Died: May 1, 1900 (aged 38)
- Education: Brown University
- Employer(s): Brown & Ives
- Spouse: Natalie Bayard Dresser (m. 1897–1900)
- Children: John Nicholas Brown II
- Parent(s): John Carter Brown I Sophia Augusta Browne
- Relatives: Nicholas Brown Jr. (grandfather); John Carter Brown III (grandson)

John Nicholas Brown I (December 17, 1861 – May 1, 1900) was an American book collector who donated his father's collection to Brown University.

== Early life ==
John Nicholas Brown was born on December 17, 1861, to John Carter Brown II (1797–1874) and Sophia Augusta Brown (1825–1909). His father was a collector of American books in the mid-19th century and was the first American to join the Hakluyt Society as a charter member in 1846, and in 1855, he was elected a member of the American Antiquarian Society. His brother was Harold Brown (1863–1900) and his sister was Sophia Augusta Brown (1867–1947), who married William Watts Sherman (1842–1912).

He prepared for college with private tutors, including William Carey Poland. In 1881, Brown entered Brown University, however, he left school after two years, citing poor health and a weak constitution. He continued his studies of his own accord, traveling extensively and studying history, architecture, languages and the classics. In 1895, the faculty of Brown University voted to confer a degree upon him as a member of the class of 1885.

=== Family ===
His paternal grandfather was Nicholas Brown Jr. (1769–1841), the namesake patron of Brown University (in 1804). His great-grandfather was Nicholas Brown Sr. (1729–1791), brother of John Brown, Moses Brown, and Joseph Brown, who was a merchant and slave trader who co-founded the College in the English Colony of Rhode Island and Providence Plantations.

== Career ==
After receiving his degree from Brown University, Brown began to work for the family business, Brown & Ives, with the assistance of his cousin William Goddard. He also served as President of the Lonsdale Company, and in 1888, Brown and his brother, Harold, formed a partnership, "J.N. & H. Brown." The brother's business was similar to the activities of the family business where they lent funds for mortgages and invested in buildings and lands out west. In their business dealings, John and Harold relied upon George W. R. Matteson, the trustee of their father's estate for advice and assistance.

== Personal life ==
On September 8, 1897, he married Natalie Bayard Dresser (1869–1950) at Trinity Church in Newport, Rhode Island. Natalie was the daughter of Brevet Major George Warren Dresser (1837–1883), a West Point graduate and an officer in the Union Army during the American Civil War, and Susan Fish Le Roy (1834–1883).

Natalie was the great-niece of Hamilton Fish (1808–1893), a U.S. Secretary of State, U.S. Senator, and New York Governor. Through the Fish family, she was a descendant of Peter Stuyvesant, the first governor of Dutch colonial New York through Hamilton Fish's mother, Elizabeth Stuyvesant, Peter Stuyvesant's 2x great-granddaughter. Her siblings included D. LeRoy Dresser (1862–1915), and Edith Stuyvesant Dresser (1873–1958), the wife of George Washington Vanderbilt II (builder of the Biltmore Estate) and later Sen. Peter Goelet Gerry.

Together, they had their only son:

- John Nicholas Brown II (1900-1979), the Assistant Secretary of the Navy (AIR) during the Truman administration, who married Anne Seddon Kinsolving (1906-1985), sister of the Rev. Dr. Arthur Lee Kinsolving, rector of Trinity Church in Boston, and later, St. James' Episcopal Church in New York. Rev. Kinsolving was the father of Lee Kinsolving (1938–1974), the actor.

Brown died on May 1, 1900, of typhoid fever, when his son was only three months old. His brother Harold Brown died a few days later after returning to the United States from Europe after hearing of his brother's death. John Nicholas Brown II was referred to as the richest child in the world at the time. In 1901, his widow donated the funds to build Emmanual Episcopal Church in Newport, RI in his memory. She died at her home, Harbor Court (now the Newport station of the New York Yacht Club), in 1950.

=== Organizations and philanthropy ===
Brown was a member of the Rhode Island Society of the Cincinnati and the New York Society of Colonial Wars (national member number 989 and state member number 528). He was elected a member of the American Antiquarian Society in 1888.

On February 1, 1890, Brown became a charter member of the Rhode Island Society of the Sons of the American Revolution. He was elected as the Society's second president and served from May 29, 1890 until May 29, 1891. Ironically, according to the Rhode Island Society's manual published in 1900, Brown "never qualified as a member of the Society, nor officiated as president." (pg. 27.) This was because he never completed a formal membership application to join the Society despite having ancestors who supported the cause of American independence.

Brown was the donor of the Providence Public Library building in Providence, RI.
