= John Nicholas Brown II =

United States Assistant Secretary of the Navy

John Nicholas Brown
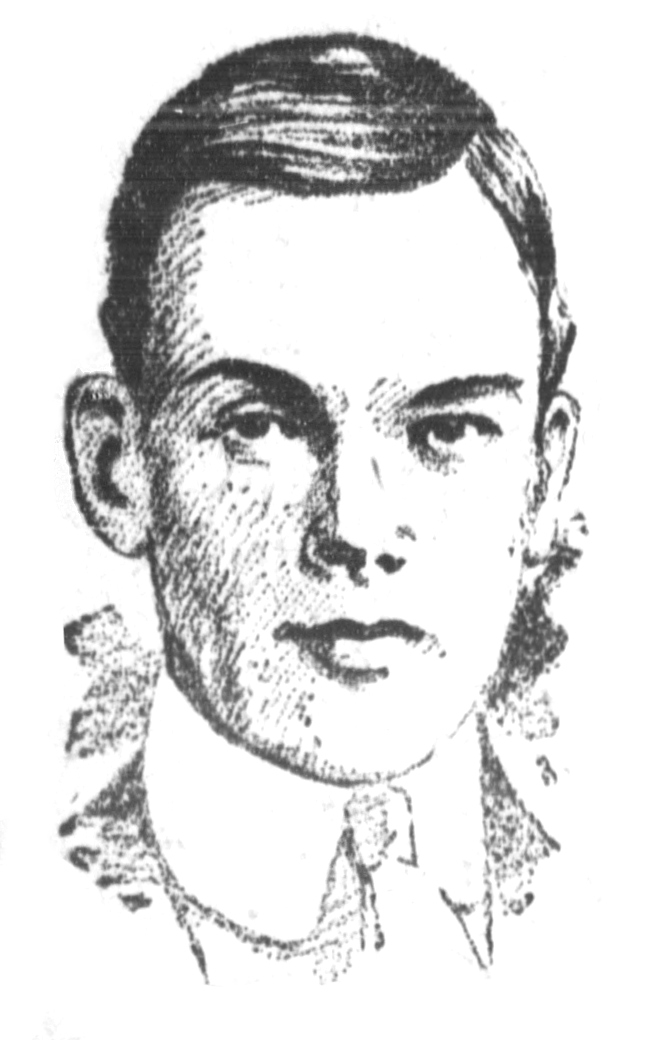
- Brown in 1921

Assistant Secretary of the Navy
- In office January 12, 1946 – March 8, 1949
- President: Harry S. Truman
- Preceded by: John L. Sullivan
- Succeeded by: Dan A. Kimball

Personal details
- Born: February 21, 1900 New York City
- Died: October 10, 1979 (aged 79) Annapolis, Maryland
- Spouse: Anne Seddon Kinsolving (m. 1930–1979)
- Children: Nicholas Brown; John Carter Brown III; Angela Bayard Brown
- Parent(s): John Nicholas Brown I Natalie Bayard Dresser
- Relatives: John Carter Brown I (grandfather)
- Education: St. George's School
- Alma mater: Harvard College
- Awards: Legion of Honour

John Nicholas Brown II (February 21, 1900 – October 10, 1979) was the United States Assistant Secretary of the Navy (AIR) from 1946 to 1949. He was a member of the Brown family that had been active in American life since before the American Revolution and who were the major early benefactors of Brown University.

== Early life ==
He was born in New York City on February 21, 1900, to John Nicholas Brown I (1861–1900), who died on May 1 of the same year, and Natalie Bayard Dresser (1869–1950), daughter of Civil War Veteran and civil engineer Brevet Major George Warren Dresser and Elizabeth Stuyvesant LeRoy.

Brown grew up in Newport, Rhode Island, and attended St. George's School, from which he graduated in 1918. Brown served briefly in the United States Navy during the closing days of the First World War as a seaman. Upon attaining his majority in 1921, Brown succeeded his father as an hereditary member of the Rhode Island Society of the Cincinnati by right of his descent from his 2x great-granduncle Major Simeon Thayer. He then attended Harvard College, from which he received a bachelor's degree in 1922, and a master's degree in 1928.

=== Family ===
His paternal grandfather was John Carter Brown (1797–1874), the son of Nicholas Brown Jr. (1769–1841), the namesake patron of Brown University (in 1804), who was a collector of American books in the mid-19th century and was the first American to join the Hakluyt Society as a charter member in 1846, and in 1855, he was elected a member of the American Antiquarian Society. His 2x great-grandfather was Nicholas Brown Sr. (1729–1791), brother of John Brown, Moses Brown, and Joseph Brown, who were successful merchants and benefactors of Providence, Rhode Island, including giving the land and building for the College in the English Colony of Rhode Island and Providence Plantations.

His mother was the great-niece of Hamilton Fish (1808–1893), a U.S. Secretary of State, U.S. Senator, and New York Governor. Through the Fish family, he was a descendant of Peter Stuyvesant, the first governor of Dutch colonial New York through Hamilton Fish's mother, Elizabeth Stuyvesant, Peter Stuyvesant's 2x great-granddaughter. His maternal uncle was D. LeRoy Dresser (1862–1915), his maternal aunt was Edith Stuyvesant Dresser (1873–1958), the wife of George Washington Vanderbilt II (builder of the Biltmore Estate) and later Senator Peter Goelet Gerry. His first cousin was Cornelia Stuyvesant Vanderbilt (1900–1976), who married John Francis Amherst Cecil (1890–1954), son of Lord William Cecil and Mary Rothes Margaret Tyssen-Amherst, 2nd Baroness Amherst of Hackney.

== Career ==
In the wake of the Wall Street crash of 1929, Brown took control of his family's real estate and textiles businesses, beginning new enterprises and streamlining others.

Near the end of World War II, Brown was commissioned as a lieutenant colonel and worked for the United States Army in Europe as Special Cultural Advisor for the Monuments, Fine Arts, and Archives program (MFAA) as well as Chief of Monuments of the U.S. Group Control Council in Germany. In this capacity, he helped supervise the return of art treasures stolen by the Nazis to their rightful owners. The work of the MFAA is depicted in the movie The Monuments Men.

Early in 1946, President of the United States Harry S. Truman nominated Brown as Assistant Secretary of the Navy (AIR) and Brown held this office from January 12, 1946, until March 8, 1949. He was a delegate to the Democratic national convention in 1948. He was elected to the American Academy of Arts and Sciences in 1950 and, in 1959, was elected to the American Philosophical Society.

After his government service, Brown settled in Providence, Rhode Island, as a senior fellow of Brown University. He served the university in a number of capacities for 49 years, including a stint as chairman of the university's building and planning committee, in which capacity he oversaw the building of a number of Brown University's buildings. He was also a regent of the Smithsonian Institution, and in 1975 was awarded the Smithsonian's Joseph Henry Medal for his cultural leadership.

=== Philanthropy ===
Brown inherited a large fortune from both his father and uncle Harold, who both died in May 1900 before he was three months old. In 1957, Fortune magazine reported that his net worth was between $75 million and $100 million. One of Brown's first acts of philanthropy was in 1924 to finance the construction of the large and ornate chapel at St. George's School in Middletown, Rhode Island. It is said he did this so that the students would no longer have to walk two miles to go to church on Sundays.

Brown was appointed to the board of directors of the Rhode Island Foundation in 1930 and served on it until his resignation in 1972. His 42-year tenure on the board was the longest in the Foundation's history. The Rhode Island Foundation is the largest philanthropic foundation in the state of Rhode Island.

Brown was invested as an Officer of the French Legion of Honour in February 1947 in recognition of his efforts to return works of art which had been looted by the Nazis during World War II.

== Personal life ==
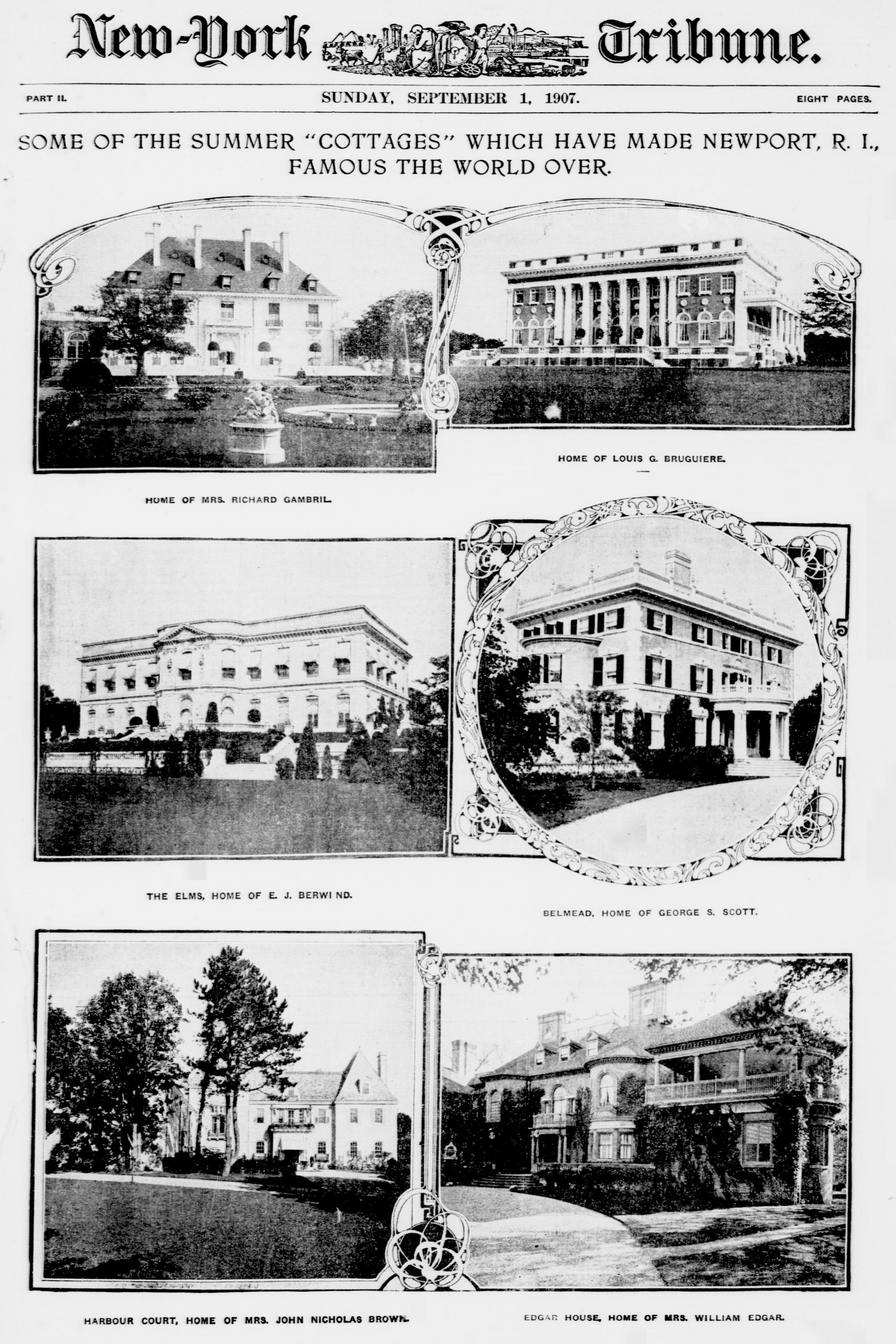
Brown's Newport, Rhode Island cottage (bottom left), among others.

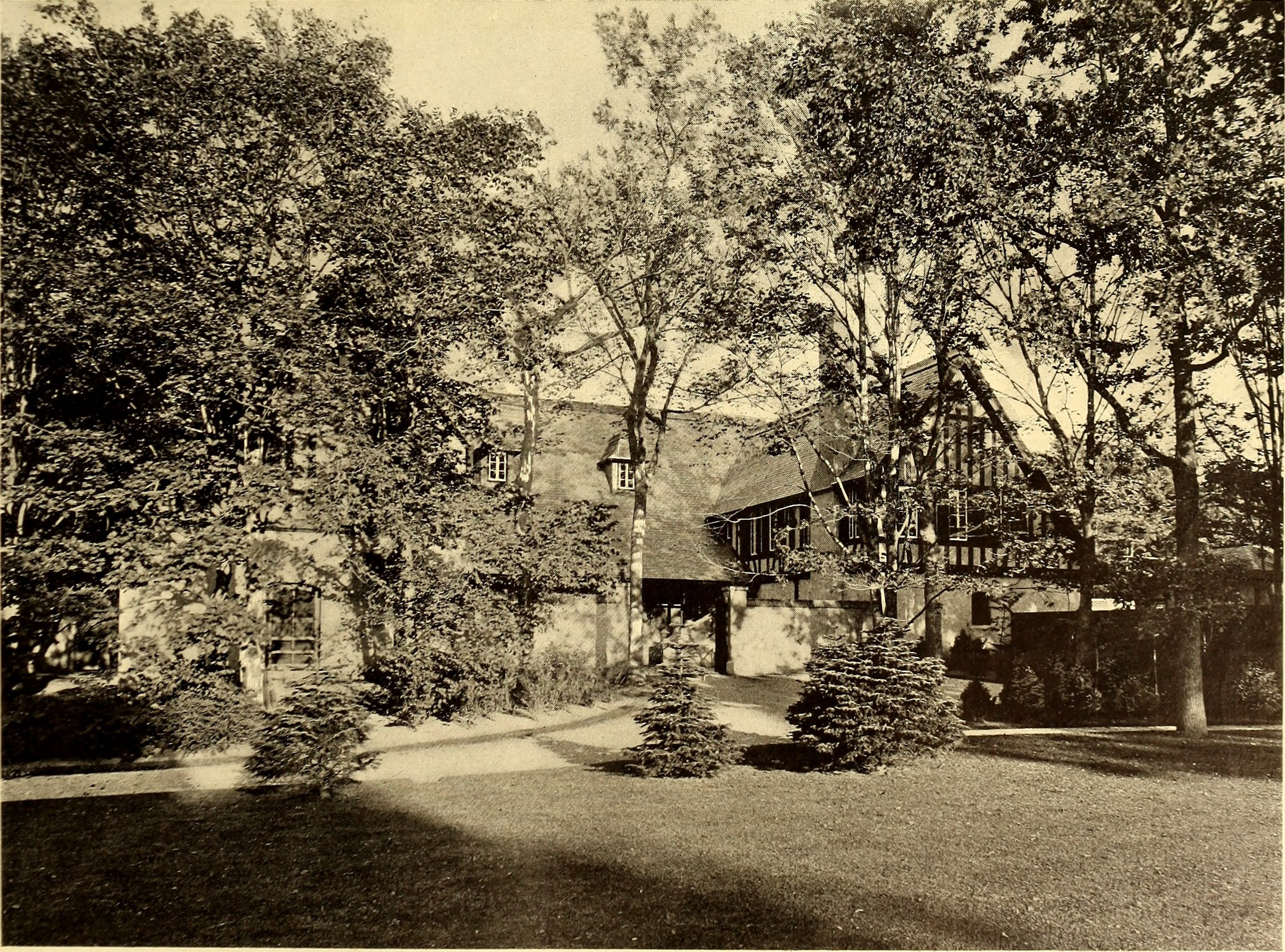
Harbour Court, Brown's cottage, now the Newport branch of the New York Yacht Club

In 1930, he met and married Anne Seddon Kinsolving (1906–1985), a society reporter working for the Baltimore News. She was the sister of the Reverend Dr. Arthur Lee Kinsolving, rector of Trinity Church, and later, St. James' Episcopal Church in New York. Reverend Kinsolving was the father of Lee Kinsolving (1938–1974), the actor. She was an avid collector of material related to military uniforms and donated the Anne S. K. Brown Military Collection to Brown University in 1981. Brown and his wife had three children:

- Nicholas Brown (born 1933), a captain in the U.S. Navy who served as the director of the National Aquarium in Baltimore from 1983 to 1995, who married Diane Verne
- John Carter Brown III (1934–2002), who became director of the National Gallery of Art, and was married to Constance Mellon Byers (1942–1983) (daughter of Richard King Mellon), and later, Pamela Braga Drexel (former wife of John R. Drexel IV).
- Angela Bayard Brown (b. 1938), who married Dr. Edwin Garvin Fischer (born 1937) in 1963, grandson of Edwin Louis Garvin.

On October 10, 1979, while celebrating his son John Carter Brown III's 45th birthday, John Nicholas Brown had a heart attack while on his yacht in Annapolis, Maryland, and died.

Brown was laid to rest, beside several of his ancestors, at the Brown family plot in the North Burial Ground in Providence.

=== Activities and Interests ===
Brown was an avid yachtsman and served as commodore of the New York Yacht Club from 1952 to 1954. He also served as commodore of the Ida Lewis Yacht Club and the Newport Yacht Club. In 1949, he had built the sailing yacht Bolero which was a 73-foot Bermudan yawl designed by Olin Stephens. The Bolero won the 635 mile Newport Bermuda Race in 1950, 1954 and 1956 – setting a new record unbeaten until 1974.

Brown belonged to many social clubs and hereditary organizations including the Pilgrims Society, the Society of the Cincinnati (in which he succeeded his father in 1921 by right of his descent from his great great uncle Major Simeon Thayer), the Military Order of the Loyal Legion of the United States (by right of the service of his grandfather, Brevet Major George Warren Dresser), the Rhode Island Society of the Sons of the American Revolution (joined in 1960 as national member number 85,691), the Hope Club, the Newport Reading Room, the Newport Country Club, the Spouting Rock Beach Association, the Fishers Island Club and the highly exclusive Clambake Club.

=== Residences ===
Brown's Newport estate, named Harbour Court, designed by Ralph Adams Cram, was inherited by his wife and, after her death, it was sold to the New York Yacht Club to serve as its Newport station.

Brown's Providence residence was the Nightingale–Brown House at 357 Benefit Street. It was built in 1792 and had been passed down through generations of the Brown family. During the 1920s, Brown redecorated the house in American colonial revival motifs. In 1985, the house was donated to Brown University after the death of his wife, Anne K.S. Brown, after which it underwent extensive renovations.

In 1932, Brown attended a Museum of Modern Art show featuring the work of Le Corbusier, Frank Lloyd Wright, Mies van der Rohe and Richard Neutra. In 1938, after acquiring land on Fishers Island, Brown convinced his wife that they should hire a modern architect to build their home. The house, named Windshield, was designed by Neutra and was completed in August 1938, at a cost of $218,000 (equivalent to $4,986,170 in 2025 dollars) and a size of more than 14,000 square feet. The house was revolutionary in that it had rubber floors, aluminium frame windows and two Buckminster Fuller designed Dymaxion bathrooms. On September 21 Windshield was partially destroyed by the 1938 New England Hurricane. Brown had the house repaired and Windshield was re-occupied by the Spring of 1939. Brown put the house up for sale in 1959 but no buyer could be found. Brown donated the house to the Fishers Island Club in 1963 and it was later sold to Michael Laughlin. The house burned down on New Year's Eve 1973.

Government offices
Preceded by John L. Sullivan	Assistant Secretary of the Navy (AIR); January 12, 1946 – March 8, 1949	Succeeded by Dan A. Kimball
