= Newport Reading Room =

Gentlemen's club in Newport, Rhode Island

Reading Room, ca. 1910

The Newport Reading Room (also known as The Reading Room), founded in 1854, is a gentlemen's club located on Bellevue Avenue in Newport, Rhode Island, USA. Its primary building features an actual book reading room. The Spouting Rock Beach Association, which owns the famed Bailey's Beach, has been reported to own the building. However this claim, according to the club's leadership, is incorrect.

The club operates under laws for 501(c)(7) Social and Recreation Clubs; in 2024, it claimed total revenue of $1,252,125 and total assets of $2,848,887.

== History ==
The Newport Reading Room was founded in 1854 by William Shepard Wetmore, a wealthy China trade merchant, and several other notable Newporters, including Yankee traders and Southern planters who summered in Newport. Several of the managing stock holders were full-time Rhode Island residents while others were summer residents. Supposedly, the Newport Casino, a rival club nearby on Bellevue Avenue was started by a former Reading Room member, James Gordon Bennett, Jr., as described:

The Newport Reading Room incident concerns Bennett and one of his polo buddies, Captain Candy, better known as "Sugar Candy." A wager was concocted whereby Sugar Candy would mount his polo pony and ride up the short flight of stairs into the exclusive club located on Bellevue Avenue. Bennett was reprimanded, Sugar Candy supposedly shown the door for the last time. As the story goes (never proven), Bennett started the Newport Casino in response.

The Reading Room has a long history of hosting charitable fundraisers, for example the New York Times reported on the club's 1912 baseball game against the U.S. Navy officers of the Atlantic Fleet to raise funds for Newport Hospital. The Reading Room was one of the centers of Newport social life with other traditional institutions such as the Redwood Library, Newport Country Club, Trinity Church, Bailey's Beach, New York Yacht Club summer clubhouse and the Newport Casino.

== Notable Stockholder Members ==
There are several categories of membership that include Stockholders, those who are eligible to vote; annual subscribers, resident and non-resident; and junior members.

- Henry H. Anderson, Jr.
- Vincent Astor
- George F. Baker
- James Gordon Bennett, Jr.
- John Nicholas Brown
- Rear Admiral Henry E. Eccles
- Elbridge T. Gerry
- Robert Goelet Sr.
- John N. A. Griswold
- Theodore Havemeyer
- Vice Admiral John T. Hayward
- Thomas Wentworth Higginson
- Arthur Curtiss James
- George Noble Jones
- William Beach Lawrence
- Lewis Cass Ledyard
- Pierre Lorillard
- Charles May Oelrichs
- Duncan Pell
- Claiborne Pell
- Frederick H. Prince
- Cornelius Vanderbilt II
- Harold S. Vanderbilt
- William Shepard Wetmore
- Rear Admiral J.C. Wylie

== See also ==
- List of American gentlemen's clubs
- Newport Casino
- Newport Country Club
