= Albert Harkness =

American classical scholar and educator

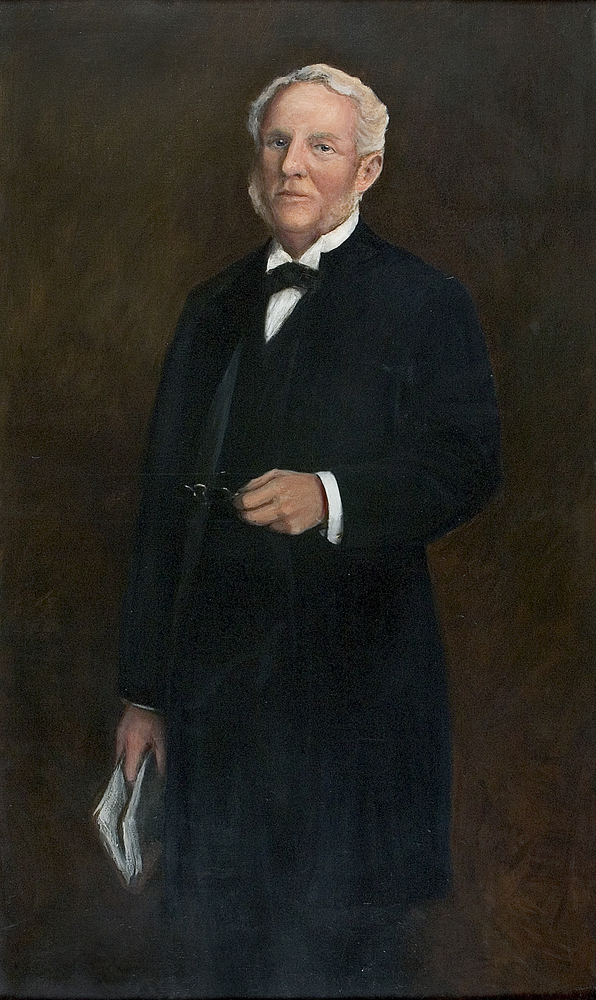
- Born: October 6, 1822; Mendon, Massachusetts
- Died: May 27, 1907 (aged 84); Providence, Rhode Island
- Citizenship: US
- Spouse: Maria Aldrich Smith Harkness
- Children: Albert Granger Harkness; Clara Frances Harkness
- Parent(s): Southwick Harkness; Phebe (Thayer) Harkness

Academic background
- Education: Brown University; Berlin; Bonn; Göttingen

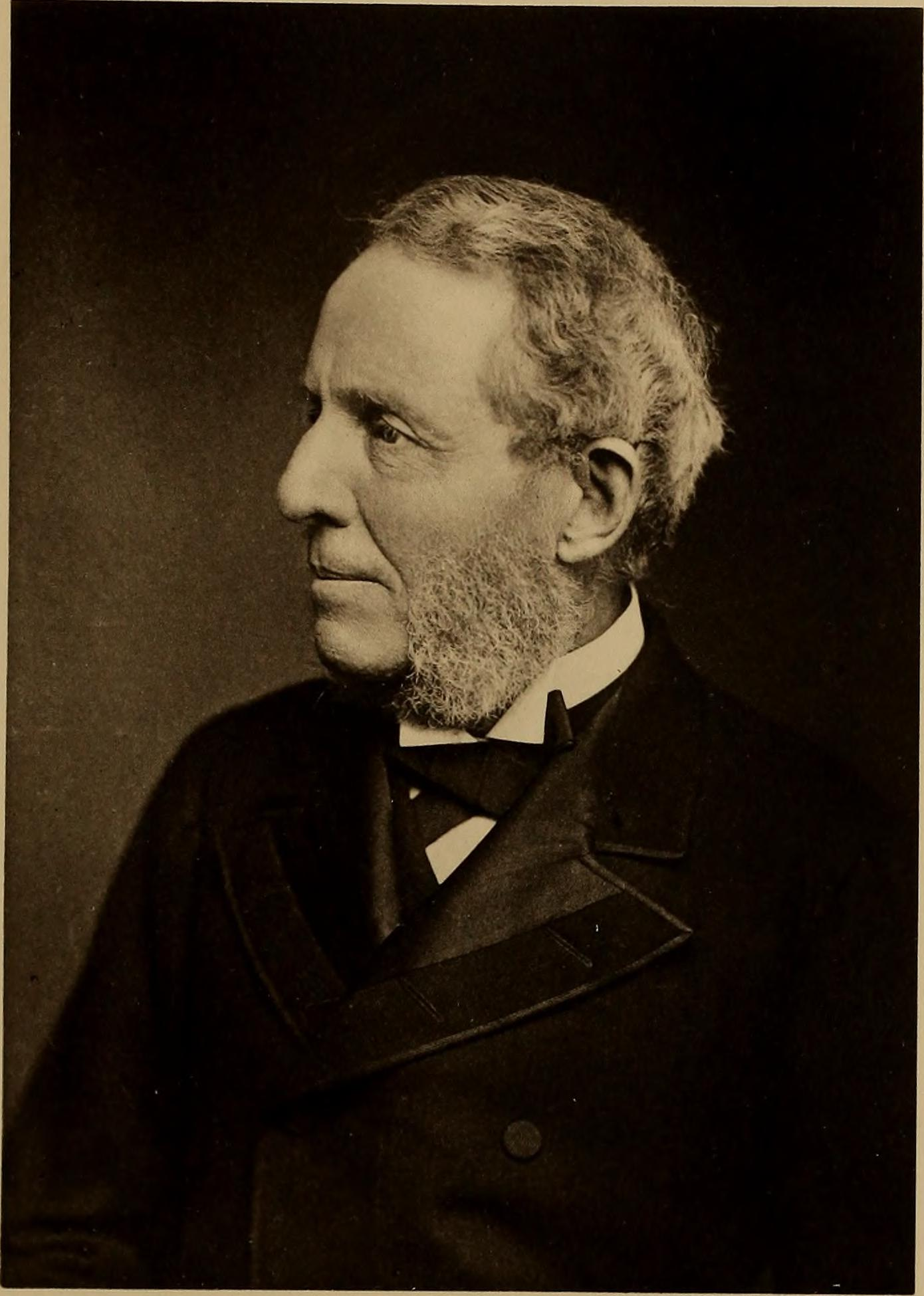
Albert Harkness

Albert Harkness (October 6, 1822 – May 27, 1907) was an American classical scholar and educator. He was professor of Greek at Brown University, and helped found the American Philological Association and the American School of Classical Studies at Athens.

== Early life ==
Harkness was born in Mendon, Massachusetts and attended Uxbridge High School and Worcester Academy. He graduated from Brown University in 1842. He was senior master of Providence High School from 1846 to 1853, and pursued studies in Germany at the universities of Berlin, Bonn, and Göttingen. Harkness was the first American to obtain a degree from Bonn (Ph.D., 1854).

== Career ==
In 1855, he was appointed professor of Greek in Brown University, a position he held until his retirement in 1892.

He visited Europe in 1870 and 1883 and there investigated educational questions, in particular the methods of German and English universities. He assisted in founding the American Philological Association, of which he was a first vice president in 1869-1870 and president in 1875–1876. As a member of the Archæological Institute of America, he was appointed in 1881 to the committee on the expediency of establishing an American School of Classical Studies at Athens, an institution which was opened in 1882. In 1884, he was elected director of the school. In 1869, he received the degree of LL.D. from Brown University.

He lectured extensively before learned societies, contributed valuable papers on original researches in philology to the Transactions of the American Philological Association, and from 1851 published a series of textbooks in Latin studies, of which it may be said that from them dated the beginning of a new era in the Latin department of classical studies in America.

== Death ==
Harkness died in Providence, Rhode Island on May 27, 1907.

== Family life ==
Harkness was the son of Southwick and Phebe (Thayer) Harkness. On May 28, 1849, Harkness married Maria Aldrich Smith. Their son Albert Granger Harkness was a Professor of Roman Literature and History at Brown University, and their daughter Clara Frances married William Carey Poland, a professor at Brown University.

== Published works ==
- First Latin Book (1851)
- "First Greek Book" (1860, 1885 revised) original cost was $1.05 hardback and was published by American Book Company New York, Cincinnati and Chicago from the press of D. Appleton & Company with two prefaces (original and revised, respectively)
- Second Latin Book and Reader (1853)
- A Latin Grammar for Schools and Colleges (1864)
- a Latin Reader (1865)
- Introduction to Latin Composition (1868, 1888)
- annotated editions of Cæsar's De Bello Gallico (1870, 1886)
- select orations of Cicero (1973, 1882)
- Sallust's Catilina (1878, 1884)
- an annotated Course in Latin Prose Authors (1878)
- a standard Latin Grammar (1864, 1881), published in a thorough revision with many additions as A Complete Latin Grammar (1898)
