= Nightingale–Brown House =

Historic house in Rhode Island, United States

- Nightingale-Brown House
- U.S. National Register of Historic Places
- U.S. National Historic Landmark
- U.S. National Historic Landmark District – Contributing property
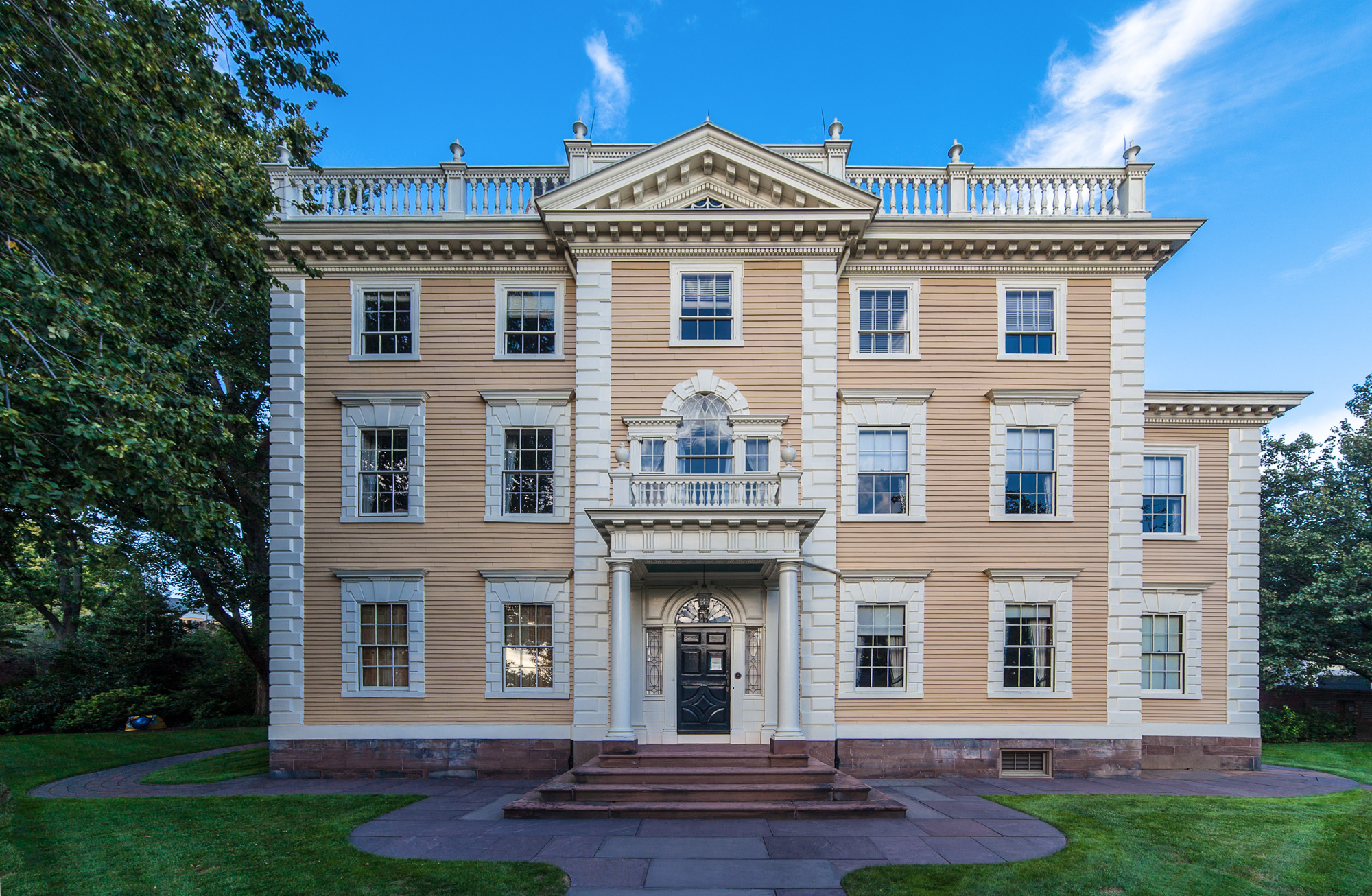
- Front elevation, 2008

- Location within Rhode Island Location within the United States
- Location: 357 Benefit St., Providence, Rhode Island
- Coordinates: 41°49′22″N 71°24′13″W
- Area: 1 acre (0.40 ha)
- Built: 1792
- Architect: Caleb Ormsbee
- Architectural style: American Colonial, Georgian, Italianate
- Part of: College Hill Historic District (ID70000019)
- NRHP reference No.: 89001242

Significant dates
- Added to NRHP: June 29, 1989
- Designated NHL: June 29, 1989
- Designated NHLDCP: November 10, 1970

The Nightingale–Brown House is a historic house at 357 Benefit Street on College Hill in Providence, Rhode Island. It is home to the John Nicholas Brown Center for Public Humanities and Cultural Heritage at Brown University. The house is architecturally significant as one of the largest surviving wood-frame houses of the 18th century, and is historically significant as the longtime seat (from 1814 to 1985) of the Brown family, whose members have been leaders of the Providence civic, social, and business community since the 17th century, and include nationally significant leaders of America's industrialization in the 19th century. The house was listed on the National Register of Historic Places and declared a National Historic Landmark in 1989.

== Description ==
The house is a large three-story wood-frame structure, set on a lot roughly 1 acre (0.40 ha) in size, built in 1791 for Colonel Joseph Nightingale. Its main facade is five bays wide, with a central projecting section. The center entrance is framed by sidelight windows and topped by an elliptical fanlight window. This framing is one of the earliest known uses of such windows in the United States. The entrance is sheltered by a square porch supported by columns, with a low railing above. Atop the doorway is a Palladian window, whose side windows are topped by dentillated cornices. The projecting section is topped by a triangular pediment, whose deeply recessed tympanum is modillioned and filled with a window. The corners of the projecting section, and of the main and side blocks, are all quoined, and the window surrounds on the first two floors also feature quoined and voussoired surrounds. The main block is covered by a hip roof, with a low balustrade surrounding it. This appearance largely matches the first known image of the house, a drawing made in 1802.

In 1814, Nicholas Brown, Jr. purchased the home. His descendants owned the house until the death of Anne S.K. Brown in 1985, at which point it was donated to Brown University. In 1853 John Carter Brown hired Thomas Tefft to design a carriage house for the property, and in 1858 a two-story addition was added to the south side. It is unknown if Tefft was involved in the design of the addition, but it has stylistic similarities to the carriage house.

In 1862 Brown hired Richard Upjohn to design a library wing, which was built in 1862–1864 and is northeast of the main block and forms a courtyard with the carriage house. This addition, like the earlier one, repeats stylistic elements of the original 1791 structure. Frederick Law Olmsted was hired to design the landscaping for the grounds in 1890; this work is still evident despite modest alterations.

== Occupants ==
Nicholas Brown, Jr. was the son of Nicholas Brown, Sr., a leading Providence merchant. He was a leading industrial developer of the early 19th century, and was such a benefactor of the local college that it was renamed Brown University in his honor. He also served in the state legislature, and cofounded the Providence Athenaeum. John Carter Brown is best known for amassing a large library, now owned by the university and operated as the John Carter Brown Library. Anne S. K. Brown, the last Brown descendant to live in this house, amassed a large collection of military documents and artifacts, which are also now owned by the university. Her son, J. Carter Brown, who directed the National Gallery of Art, was raised in the house.

== John Nicholas Brown Center for Public Humanities and Cultural Heritage ==
The John Nicholas Brown Center for Public Humanities and Cultural Heritage (JNBC) was housed in the building for many years. The center, founded as the John Nicholas Brown Center for the Study of American Civilization in 1979 and part of Brown University since 1995, collaborates on public and scholarly humanities projects with local, national, and international partners working in the arts, history, education and community engagement. The center also offered a master's degree in Public Humanities through Brown. In December 2023, the JNBC announced that the center would be renamed the John Nicholas Brown Center for Advanced Studies and the MA program in Public Humanities was put on hold.

== Gallery ==
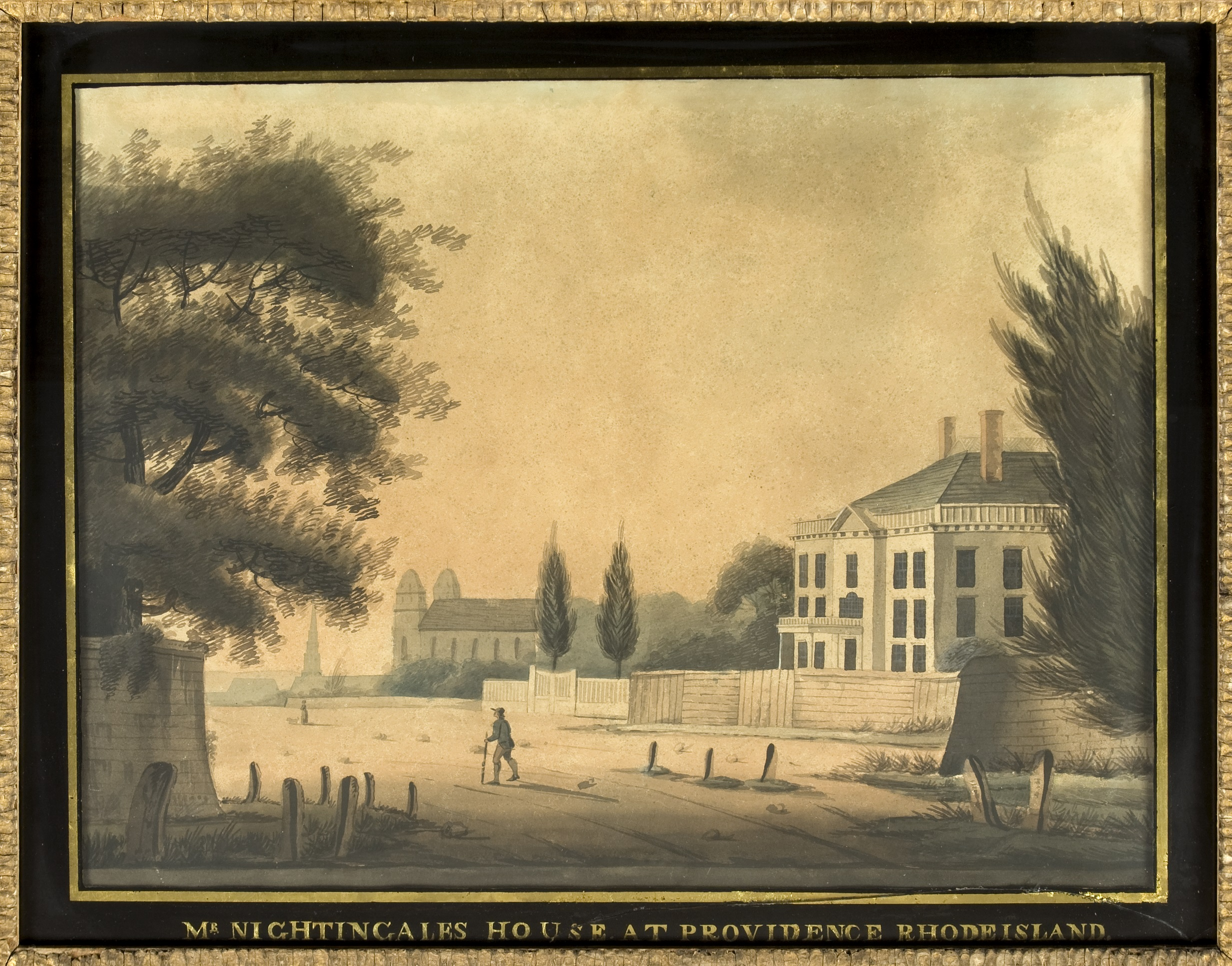
A painting of the house by Alice Pelham Banniter (c. 1802)

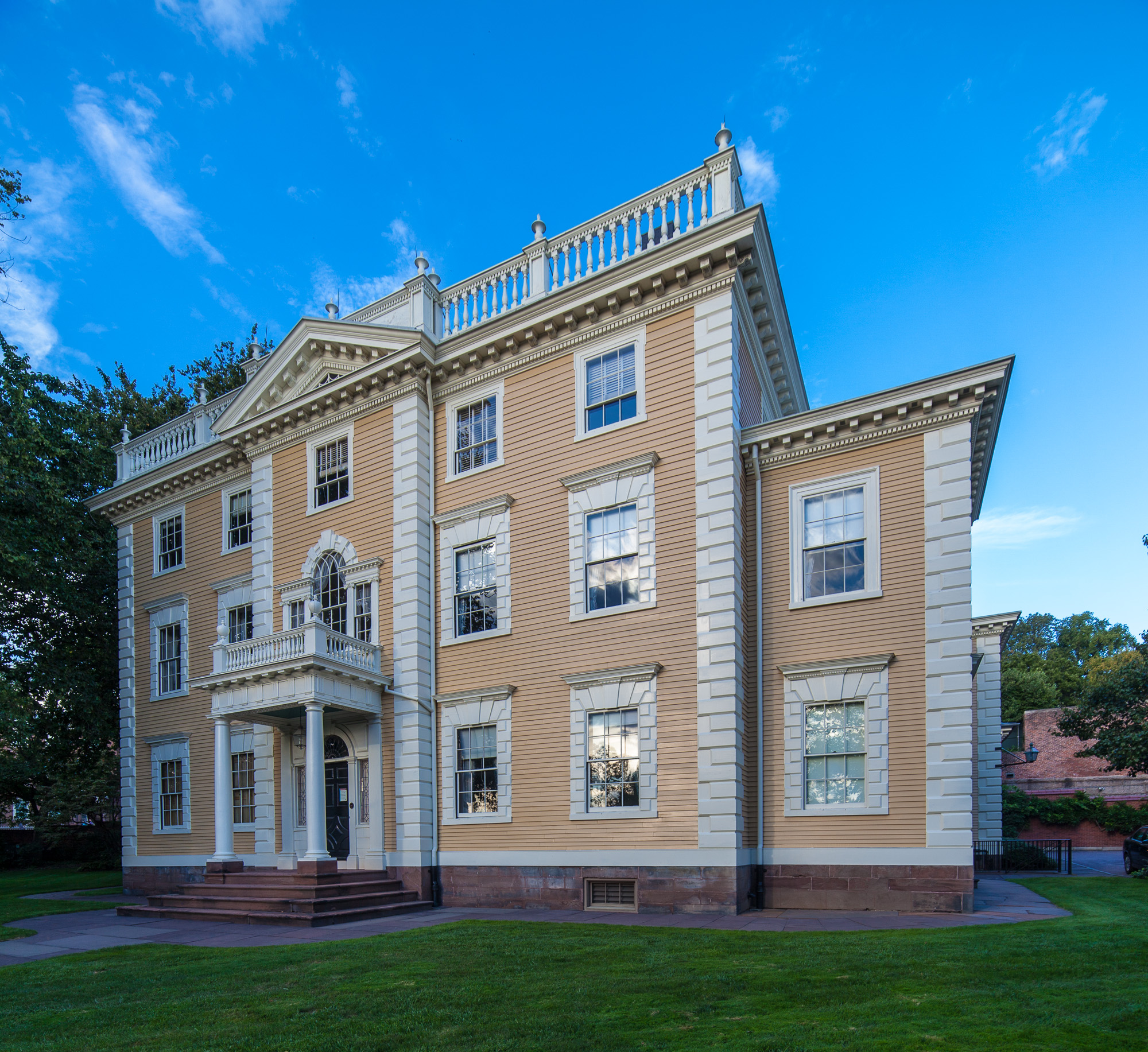
The house in 2012

== See also ==
- List of National Historic Landmarks in Rhode Island
- National Register of Historic Places listings in Providence, Rhode Island
