= John Carter Brown =

American book collector (1797–1874)

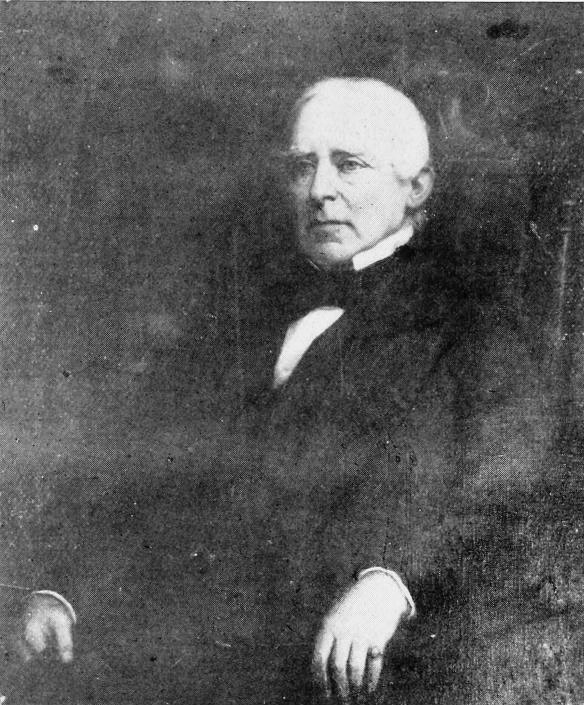
- Born: 1797
- Died: June 11, 1874 (aged 76–77); Providence, Rhode Island, US
- Education: Brown University
- Occupation: Book collector
- Spouse: Sophia Augusta Brown (m. 1859)
- Children: John; Harold; Sophia
- Father: Nicholas Brown Jr.
- Relatives: Nicholas Brown Sr. (grandfather); John Carter (grandfather)

Signature
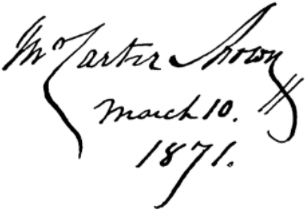

John Carter Brown II (1797 – June 11, 1874) was a book collector whose library formed the basis of the John Carter Brown Library at Brown University.

== Early life ==
John Carter Brown II was born in 1797, the youngest of three surviving children born to Nicholas Brown Jr. (1769–1841), the namesake patron of Brown University, and Ann Carter, daughter of John Carter, a prominent printer in Providence. His grandfather was Nicholas Brown Sr. (1729–1791), brother of John Brown, Moses Brown, and Joseph Brown, merchants, active in Rhode Island politics, who brought the College of Rhode Island to Providence in 1771.

During his upbringing, he was taught philanthropy and public leadership by his father and his uncles who were involved with such work. He attended Brown University (renamed in honor of a gift made by his father in 1804) and graduated in 1816. His graduation oration was on "The Revolution of Empires."

== Career ==
In 1822, John Carter Brown was sent to Europe as a super-cargo for Brown & Ives. After being shipwrecked in France, he turned the business trip into a two-year grand tour. Dr. Benjamin Carter, his uncle, was an important influence in introducing John Carter Brown to "the great subject," the interaction between the old and new worlds.

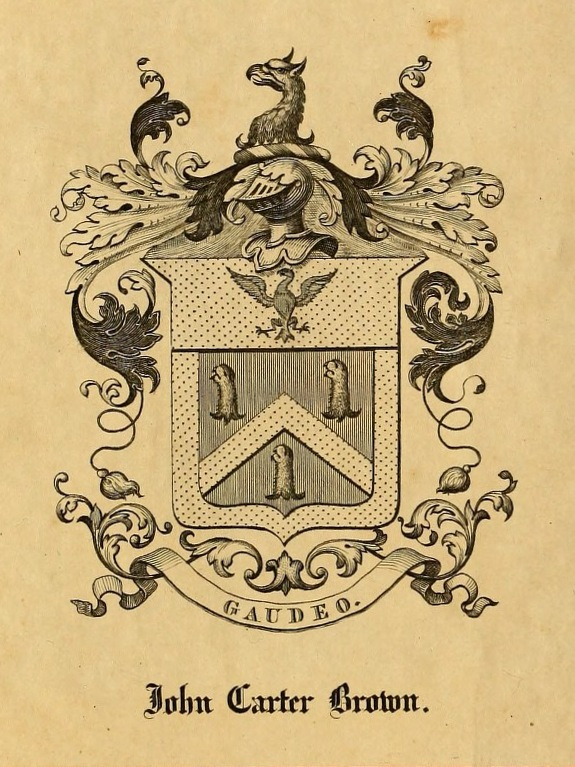
Bookplate (exlibris) of John Carter Brown

After his father's death in 1841, John Carter Brown had the freedom to withdraw from Brown & Ives affairs and to develop his passion for books. In fact, he was continuing a family tradition as his ancestors had been buying books since 1749, helping to found the Providence Library in 1758 and 83 years later, the Providence Athenaeum. In 1846, he bought his elder brother's collection of books on the Americas and began purchasing books in Europe, using Henry Stevens as his agent. The same year, he bought the collection of Frenchman Henri Ternaux. When his collection became too large, he expanded his house, the Nightingale-Brown House, by adding a modern fireproof library; he also hired a full-time librarian, John Russell Bartlett, to manage the collection and produce its first catalogue.

In 1846, he became the first American to join the Hakluyt Society as a charter member, and in 1855, he was elected a member of the American Antiquarian Society. In 1852, he received an honorary doctor of laws degree from Brown University.

== Personal life ==
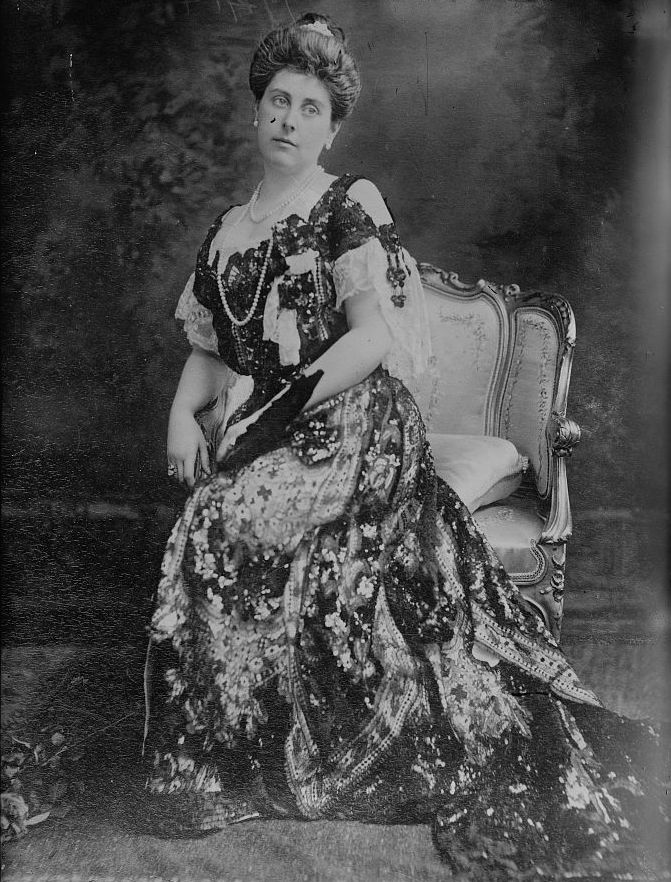
Brown's daughter, Sophia Augusta Brown (1867–1947), second wife of William Watts Sherman, circa 1914

In 1859, at the age of 62, he married Sophia Augusta Brown (1825–1909), a descendant of Roger Williams (1603–1683). Together, they had:

- John Nicholas Brown I (1861–1900), who married Natalie Bayard Dresser (1869–1950)
- Harold Brown (1863–1900), who married Georgette Wetmore Sherman (1872–1960), daughter of William Watts Sherman (1842–1912) by his first wife, in 1892, and niece of Sen. George Peabody Wetmore.
- Sophia Augusta Brown (1867–1947), who married William Watts Sherman (1842–1912) in 1885, after the death of his first wife in 1884.

He died on June 11, 1874, at 77 years of age. The bulk of his estate, besides a $50,000 (equivalent to $1,422,794 in 2025 dollars) donation to Brown, was left to his children. The trustees were his wife, Robert H. Ives, Thomas P. I. Goddard, and George W. R. Matteson. In 1876, his wife had a cottage in Newport on Bellevue Avenue.

=== Philanthropy ===
In addition to gladly sharing his books, he still continued to make contributions to Brown University, Butler Hospital, and the Rhode Island Hospital. He played major roles in Anti-Slavery campaigns, he became President of the Emigrant Aid Society. Before his death, he was able to amass a collection of 7,500 books. When his oldest son died in 1900, his well-collected books were granted to Brown University with an endowment and a building.

=== Descendants ===
He was the grandfather of John Nicholas Brown II (1900-1979), Assistant Secretary of the Navy, and great-grandfather of J. Carter Brown III (1934-2002), director of the National Gallery of Art.
