= Duncan, Sherman & Company =

Defunct American banking firm

- Founded: 1852
- Fate: Bankruptcy (1875)
- Headquarters: New York City, New York
- Key people: Alexander Duncan; Watts Sherman; William Watts Sherman; J.P. Morgan
- Products: Financial services

Duncan, Sherman & Company was a New York City banking firm, founded in 1852, that went bankrupt in 1875.

== History ==
Duncan, Sherman & Company was established in 1852 by Scottish immigrant Alexander Duncan, Watts Sherman (the former cashier and general manager of the Albany City Bank) and William Butler Duncan Sr. (Alexander Duncan's son). After incorporating, the firm purchased a lot at 11 Pine Street, on the corner of Nassau Street, and hired New York City architect Alexander Saeltzer to design the Duncan, Sherman Company building. In 1866, the firm's office suffered a fire which destroyed "some old books and duplicate letters" but did not do much damage otherwise.

When the original partnership expired on July 1, 1862, Alexander Duncan withdrew from the firm but left his capital in the firm which he assigned to his two sons, W. Butler Duncan and David Duncan. Upon the death of Watts Sherman in 1865, Francis H. Green and William Watts Sherman, Watts Sherman's son who had trained as a physician, joined the company as partners. Charles H. Dabney served as a partner in the firm, as well as the company accountant.

The firm invested heavily in Mobile and Ohio Railroad stock, and acted as the American representatives of George Peabody and Company, which was known as J.S. Morgan & Co. after George Peabody retired in 1864 and Junius S. Morgan took over (the firm later became known as Morgan Grenfell). Beginning in 1857, J.P. Morgan, son of Junius S. Morgan, apprenticed as cashier at the firm. Morgan left the bank in 1860, along with Charles H. Dabney, to establish his own firm and take over as the agent for his father's company.

In June 1875, former teller William F. Leslie, along with his accomplice, Ella Shaw ("a fine-looking young woman of about twenty-five years of age."), was charged with robbing the firm of $25,000.

=== 1875 failure ===
On July 27, 1875, the firm failed with liabilities in excess of $5,000,000. The business was "placed in the hands of an assignee--ex Judge William D. Shipman." "The suspension of Duncan, Sherman and Company was a shock to the business community of New York and to the country. The firm was one of the oldest and strongest in the country." In 1878, Shipman auctioned the firms investment in the Mobile and Ohio Railroad, filed reports for several years thereafter.

Some initially blamed the failure of Duncan, Sherman on the Union Bank of London, however, the Union Bank had not failed, but, instead, had refused to honor the drafts of the American bank. Duncan, Sherman & Co. was due to its heavy investment in cotton on behalf of English buyers, which in 1875 had broken down markets and "spread ruin among the cotton mills in England."

In 1878, Duncan and Francis H. Grain (both of New York) and William Watts Sherman (of Newport) "lately composing the firm of Duncan, Sherman, and Company," acquired 758 shares of Franco-Texan Land Company stock through land-grant bonds which was associated with the Texas and Pacific Railway.
