= William Shepard Wetmore =

Early American businessman

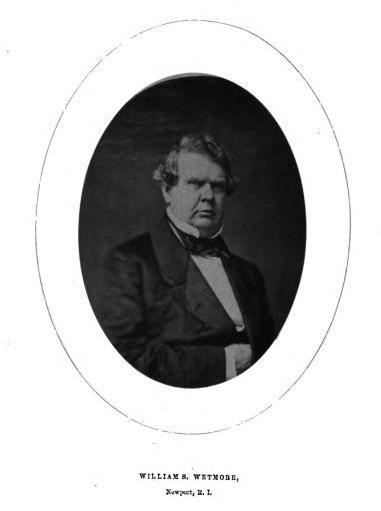
- Born: January 26, 1801; St. Albans, Vermont, U.S.
- Died: June 16, 1862 (aged 61)
- Spouses: Esther Phillips Wetmore (m. 1837; died 1838) Anstiss Derby Rogers (m. 1843)
- Children: 4, including George Wetmore
- Parent(s): Nancy Shepard; Seth Wetmore

William Shepard Wetmore (January 26, 1801 – June 16, 1862) was an American businessman and philanthropist who was an Old China Trade merchant.

== Early life ==
He was born on January 26, 1801, to Nancy Shepard and Seth Wetmore in St. Albans, Vermont. He was a sixth-generation descendant of Thomas Whitmore, who immigrated to Boston in 1635 from the west coast of England and became one of the earliest settlers of the Connecticut Colony. His mother died on February 2, 1802. He had two stepbrothers Charles Wright Wetmore and Seth Downing Wetmore and one stepsister Nancy Shepard Wetmore. William moved to Connecticut with his aunt and uncle and was educated at Cheshire Academy in Cheshire, Connecticut.

== Career ==
William was mentored by an uncle, Samuel Wetmore, who was in a mercantile partnership with another uncle, Chauncy Whittlesey, in Middletown, Connecticut. In 1815 Samuel and his brother William Willard Wetmore moved to Providence, Rhode Island, entering into a business partnership with the merchants Edward Carrington & Company. When William was fourteen years of age, he was hired aboard the ship Fame, bound for England, South America, and the East Indies. In 1823, a trip on the Lion stranded him in Valparaíso, Chile. He took employment in Chile with the firm Richard Alsop of Middletown, Connecticut. This eventually led to a partnership of Alsop, Wetmore and Cryder in 1825 with John Cryder of Philadelphia. In 1829, he retired from the firm.

=== China Trade ===
Due to impaired health William's physician advised a career move to China. In 1833, he traveled to Canton, China and took over a partnership in Dunn & Company. He formed close ties with a junior partner Joseph Archer. He went on to establish a new merchant house, Wetmore & Company, with Joseph Archer. Wetmore's profit and loss ledgers from 1834–1839 reveal that the primary goods brokered by Wetmore & Co. were tea, tea papers, silks and spices. Lesser cargoes were wines, ports, opium, hemp, pearl buttons, copper and coffee. They also transported a variety of foreign currencies, and delivered Sunday newspapers. "Fast boats" were commonly employed for personal passages and letters. The company went on to be one of the largest mercantile houses in the East Indies despite the fact that Wetmore was opposed to the opium trade. During his time in the Far East, Wetmore collected a variety of Chinese objects, porcelains and china, which he imported home.

It was in 1835 that the Maryland merchant George Peabody sailed to London on a mission to defer a United States banking crisis when states had begun skipping interest payments on bonds marketed in London. Peabody eventually enjoyed a huge success as a merchant banker in London and as a self-appointed American ambassador of the mercantile industry. He developed a form of wholesale banking known as merchant banks and became a leading dealer of American state bonds in London. It was through family and business connections that William S. Wetmore began a lifelong friendship with the prominent financier Peabody.

=== Later life ===
In 1844, he revisited his partnership with Cryder and formed the house of Wetmore and Cryder in New York City. He retired from the firm in 1847. According to Barrett in The Old Merchants of New York City, besides his success in the merchant trade, Wetmore acquired vast land holdings of 10,000 acres (40 km^{2}) in Ohio and 70,000 acres (280 km^{2}) in Tennessee and his net worth at retirement was valued over one million dollars. Wetmore later left New York City and retired to Newport, Rhode Island, where he bought 15 acres (61,000 m^{2}) of land.

== Personal life ==
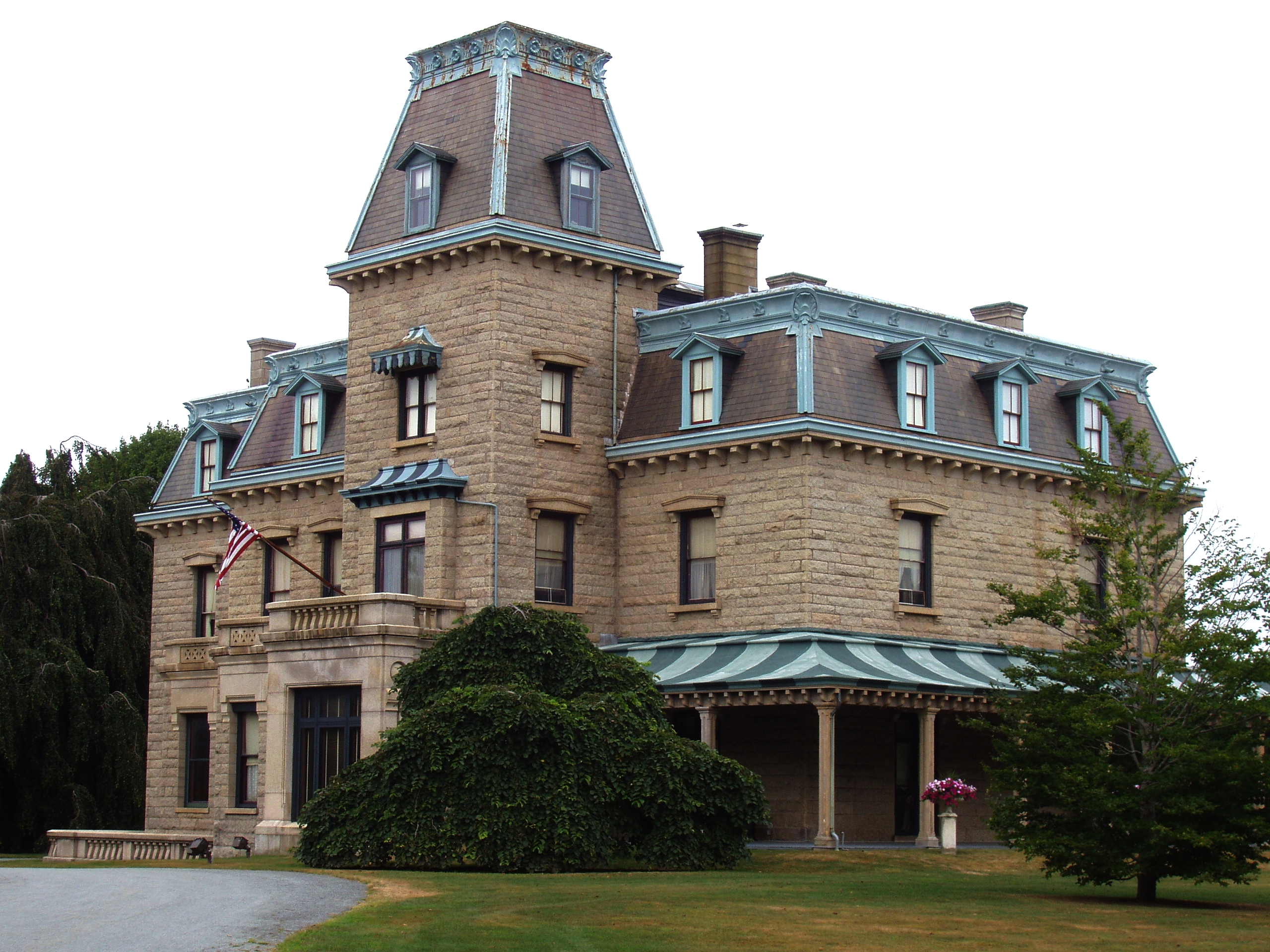
Chateau Sur Mer, Wetmore's home in Newport, Rhode Island, built in 1852

On October 24, 1837, William married his cousin, Esther Phillips Wetmore of Middletown, Connecticut, at Gloucester Lodge, Regent's Park, London. She was the daughter of his uncle Samuel Wetmore and a sister of Mary Cryder. The following year, a daughter was born in New York City, who died at birth or soon thereafter on October 12, 1838. Esther died on October 26, 1838.

After her death, he married 21-year-old Anstiss Derby Rogers in Salem, Massachusetts, on September 5, 1843, daughter of John Wittingham Rogers. They had three children:

- William Shepard Wetmore Jr. (1844–1858), who died of scarlet fever in June 1858.
- George Peabody Wetmore (1846–1921), later the Governor of Rhode Island and a U.S. Senator.
- Annie Derby Rogers Wetmore (1848–1884), who married William Watts Sherman on July 7, 1871.

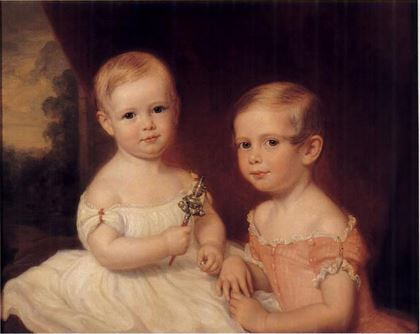
The Wetmore Boys, George and William Jr., by George Peter Alexander Healy.

In Newport, he built Chateau-sur-Mer, one of the first of the grand Bellevue Avenue mansions of the Gilded Age in Newport, Rhode Island. It is now open to the public as a museum. He furnished it with "strange and interesting" Chinese lacquer furniture and porcelain. In 1860 he added a massive stone moon gate on the grounds from designs brought back from China.

However, there is no mention of his wife, Anstiss, in a series of letters written between Annie, George, and their father, corresponding between Newport and New York City during the years 1856–1860. It is believed she lived at the Merlano Cottage in Jamaica Plain, Massachusetts. According to the 1860 and 1865 census, Mrs. Wetmore is not residing at Chateau-sur-Mer. Servants living at the house in the 1860 census were a butler, cook, laundress and chambermaid. Another resident in the 1860 census at Chateau-sur-Mer was a Wetmore cousin, twenty-year-old Lucy Dennison.

William S. Wetmore conducted an active community life in Newport as a founder and incorporator of the Newport Historical Society in 1854, as the first and continuing chairman of the Newport Reading Room, 1854–1861, and as a Director of the Redwood Library from 1856 to 1862. Wetmore was one of sixteen Newporters who joined to contribute $16,500.00 to Touro Park. He was also elected vice president of the innovative Butler Hospital for the insane in 1858, which initiated reform of treatment for the poor and insane.

Upon William Wetmore's death on June 16, 1862, sixteen-year-old George and fourteen-year-old Annie were master and mistress of Chateau-sur-Mer.
