= Nicholas Brown Jr. =

American businessman and philanthropist

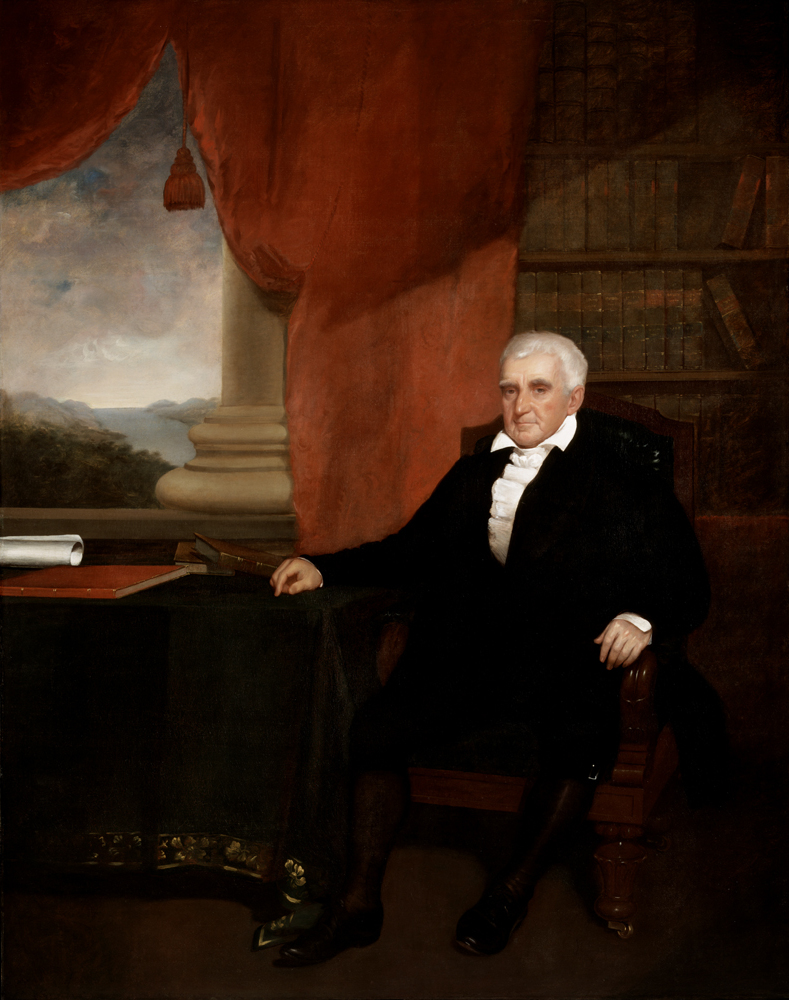
- Nicholas Brown Jr., painted by Chester Harding, 1836
- Born: April 4, 1769; Providence, Colony of Rhode Island and Providence Plantations
- Died: September 27, 1841 (aged 72); Providence, Rhode Island, U.S.
- Resting place: North Burial Ground; Providence, Rhode Island
- Education: Brown University (1786)
- Occupations: Legislator; Philanthropist
- Children: Nicholas Brown III; John Carter Brown II
- Parent(s): Nicholas Brown; Rhoda Jenckes

Nicholas Brown Jr. (April 4, 1769 – September 27, 1841) was an American businessman and philanthropist from Providence, Rhode Island, and the namesake of Brown University.

== Early life ==
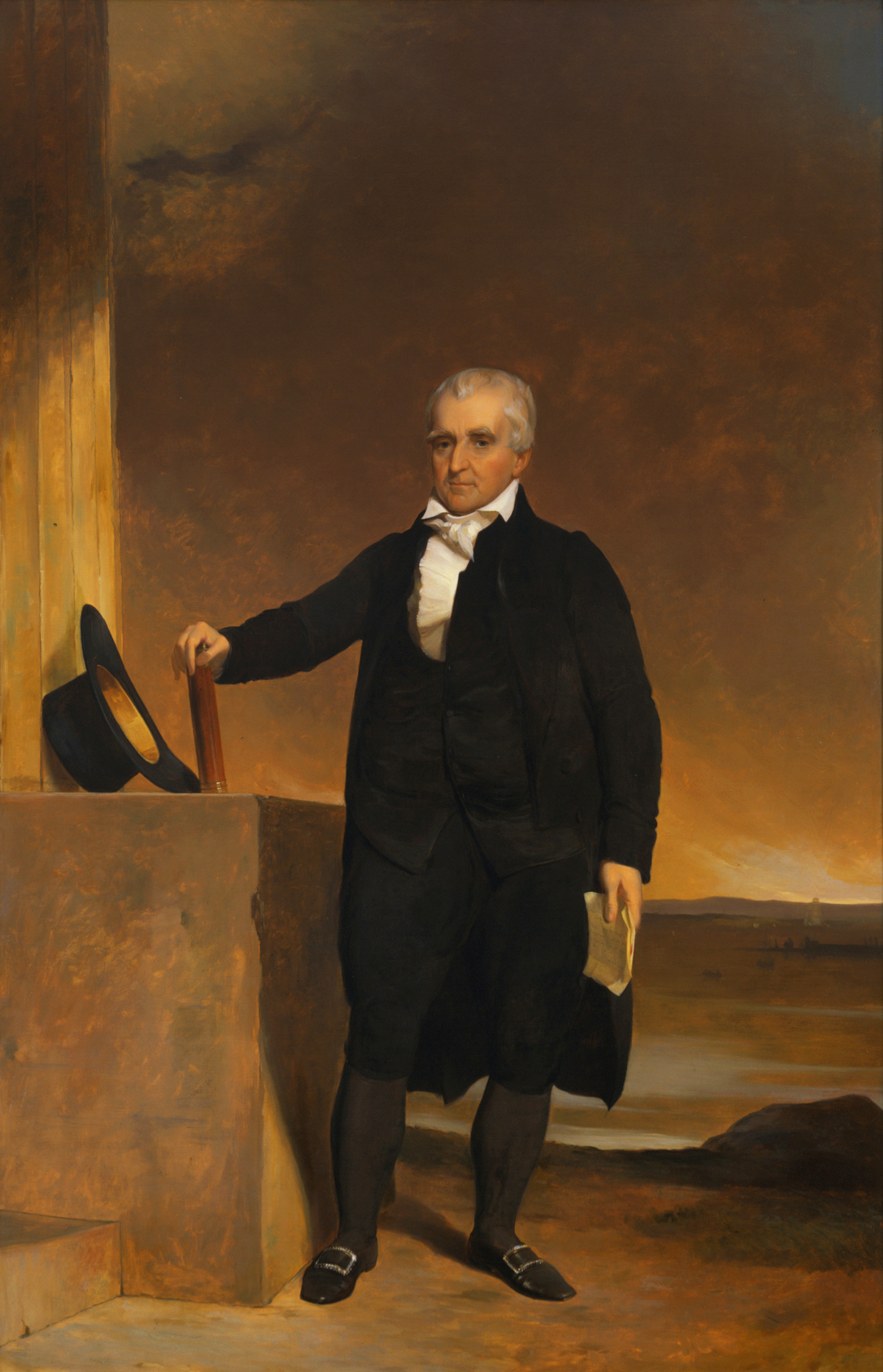
A portrait of Nicholas Brown Jr. posthumous painted by Thomas Sully in 1847

Brown was the son of Rhoda Jenckes (1741–1783) and Nicholas Brown Sr. (1729–1791), a merchant and co-founder of Brown University (which was then called College of Rhode Island and Providence Plantations). He was the nephew of John Brown (1736–1803) and Moses Brown (1738–1836) and a descendant of English colonist and Baptist minister Chad Brown (c. 1600–1650), who co-founded Providence. His maternal grandfather was Daniel Jenckes (1701–1774), a judge from a prominent family.

== Career ==
Both Nicholas Brown Jr. and his father were members of and large donors to the First Baptist Church in America. Brown Jr. graduated from the College of Rhode Island and Providence Plantations in 1786. After the death of his father, he created the company of Brown & Ives with his future brother-in-law Thomas Poynton Ives, and served in the state legislature as a Federalist.

After inheriting his father's estate in 1791, Brown became such a great benefactor to the school that it was renamed Brown University in 1804 when he donated $5,000 to the college. His total gifts to it were over $150,000. He also co-founded the Providence Athenaeum and was active in various Baptist and literary causes. He was elected a member of the American Antiquarian Society in 1813.

== Personal life ==
He was married twice; in 1791 to Ann Carter (1770–1798), daughter of John Carter (1745–1814), a prominent printer in Providence, and in 1801, to Mary Bowen Stelle (d. December, 1836), daughter of Benjamin Stelle, Esq.

His children were:

- Nicholas Brown III (1792–1859), who married his 2nd cousin, Abby Mason (1800–1822), daughter of James Brown Mason (1775–1819), in 1820. After her death, he married Caroline Matilda Cements (1809–1879) in 1831.
- Moses Brown (1793–1794), who died as an infant
- Anne Carter Brown (1794–1828), who married John Brown Francis (1791–1864), the grandson of her father's uncle, John Brown, in 1822.
- John Carter Brown II (1797–1874), who married Sophia Augusta Brown (1825–1909), daughter of Patrick Brown and Harriot Theyer, and a descendant of minister Roger Williams (1603–1683).

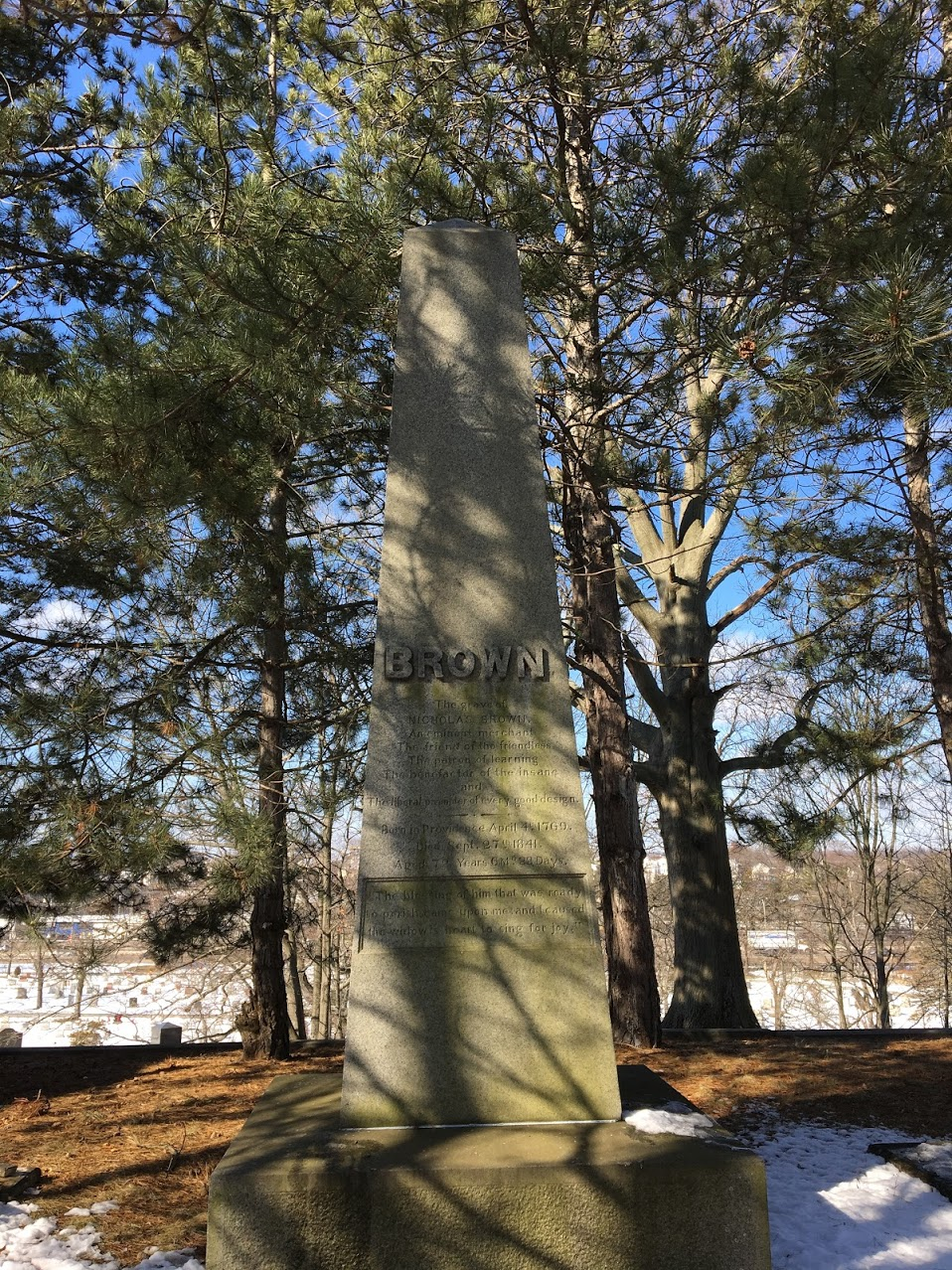
Brown's grave at North Burial Ground

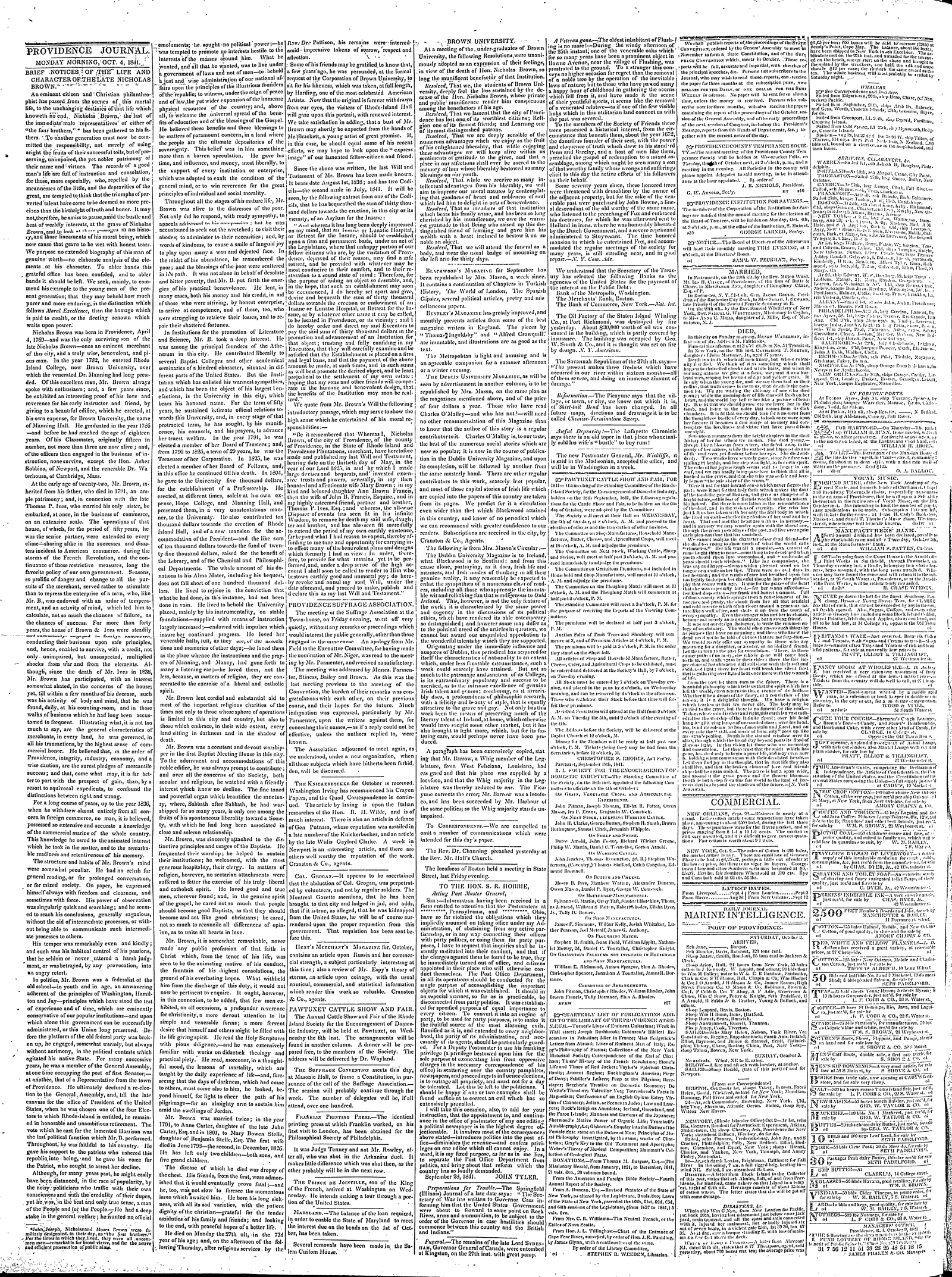
Write up by the Providence Journal following Nicholas Browns death

After his death September 27, 1841, Brown was interred in North Burial Ground in Providence. He left a $30,000 bequest to found a mental hospital, which eventually became Butler Hospital.

== See also ==
- Nightingale-Brown House
