= Nicholas Brown Sr. =

American slave trader and merchant

- Born: July 26, 1729; Providence, Rhode Island, Colony of Rhode Island, British America (now Rhode Island, U.S.)
- Died: May 29, 1791 (aged 61); Providence, Rhode Island, U.S.
- Occupations: Merchant; Slave trader Philanthropist
- Children: Nicholas Brown II
- Relatives: Chad Brown, ancestor John Brown, brother Moses Brown, brother Joseph Brown, brother John Brown Francis, grandson

Nicholas Brown Sr. (July 26, 1729 – May 29, 1791) was an American merchant, civic leader and slave trader who was a co-signer of the founding charter of the College of Rhode Island in 1763. In 1771, Brown was instrumental in convincing Baptist authorities to locate a permanent home for the college in his hometown of Providence. In 1804, the college was renamed Brown University following a gift made by Brown's son Nicholas Brown Jr.

== Biography ==
Born in 1729, the second child of James Brown II and Hope Power Brown, Nicholas Brown Sr. was apprenticed to his uncle Obadiah Brown from the age of 16. Just before his 21st birthday, his older brother Captain James Brown died at sea. Nicholas delayed his marriage to Rhoda Jenckes until he was 33 years old. Following the death of his uncle Obadiah, the family business conglomerate that included maritime trade along the Eastern Seaboard, with the Caribbean and with England; a rum distillery; spermaceti candle manufacturing; an iron foundry (the Hope Furnace); and a network of shops, was renamed Nicholas Brown & Co. Until 1771, Brown worked in partnership with his three younger brothers Joseph, John, and Moses, who were known in Rhode Island annals as the "Four Brothers." Thereafter, the brothers continued to collaborate on ventures but were no longer partners.

Brown served in the Rhode Island Legislature and became a civic leader, funding or fundraising for the paving of Providence streets, a library, a market house, the College of Rhode Island's first building, the First Baptist Church, a fire engine and other civic improvements. During the Revolution, he speculated in war bonds, supplied the Continental Army with gunpowder and foodstuffs, transformed the Hope Furnace into cannon works, and funded several privateering ventures. During the post-war "critical period," Brown was a leader of the Federalist faction in Rhode Island that opposed paper money and supported ratifying the U.S. Constitution.

Shortly after taking over the family business Brown ordered a nine-and-a half foot mahogany desk-and-bookcase crafted by Daniel Spencer, who was the nephew of John Goddard. It was sold for his descendant, Nicholas Brown VI by Christie's Auctioneers on June 3, 1989, for $12,100,000, (~$26.6 million in 2024) the highest price ever paid for a piece of decorative art at that date, to fund the restoration of the Nightingale-Brown House, which today is the John Nicholas Brown Center for Public Humanities and Cultural Heritage at Brown University. The desk-and-bookcase currently resides in a Private Collection.

Following Rhoda Brown's death in 1783, Brown married Avis Binney. He had ten children with Rhoda and one with Avis, of which only two survived: a son Nicholas Brown Jr. and a daughter, Hope, who married Thomas Poynton Ives.

== Controversy ==
As head of the family business, Nicholas Brown Sr. made a number of controversial decisions regarding smuggling, attempting to corner the tobacco market in Surinam, rigging elections, and most notably attempting a slave trading voyage in 1764 to fund his new iron foundry. The disastrous 1764 voyage of "The Sally" is described in detail in the final report of Brown University's Steering Committee on Slavery and Justice. Thereafter, Brown never again attempted slave trading and ensured his son was mentored by George Benson, an ardent abolitionist.
