= Washington Harbour =

Mixed-use in D.C.

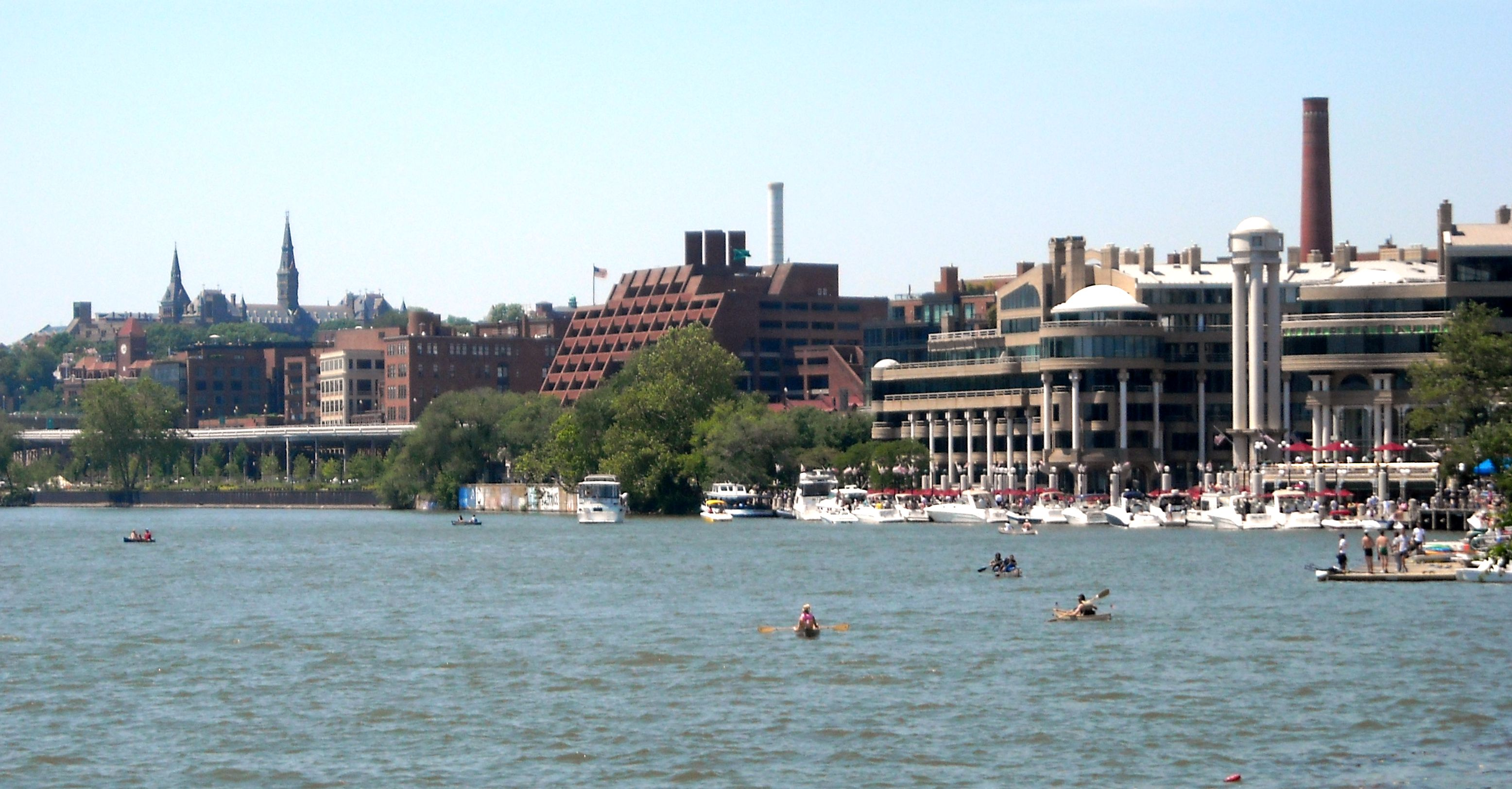
- The Potomac River waterfront in Georgetown with Washington Harbour to the right
- Interactive map of Washington Harbour
- Location: Washington, D.C., U.S.
- Address: 3000 and 3050 K Street, N.W.
- Coordinates: 38.901796°N 77.060086°W
- Status: Complete
- Groundbreaking: November 1981
- Constructed: June 1986
- Use: Office space, retail space, condominia
- Website: thewashingtonharbour.com

Companies
- Architect: Arthur Cotton Moore
- Developer: Washington Harbour Associates LLC
- Owner: MRP Realty and Rockpoint Group
- Manager: JLL Properties; Global Holdings Management Group

Technical details
- Cost: US$200
- Buildings: 5
- Size: 6 acres (24,000 m^{2})
- Leasable area: 536,000 square feet (49,800 m^{2})
- Parking: 489

Washington Harbour is a Class-A mixed-use development at 3000 and 3050 K Street, N.W., in Washington, D.C., United States. The southern edge of the development borders the Potomac River on the Georgetown waterfront. Designed by Arthur Cotton Moore, the complex consists of two curved towers and three other buildings attached to them, all in the Postmodern architectural style. Completed in 1986, the complex contains luxury condominia, offices, retail space, restaurants, and underground parking.

Construction of the complex was preceded by a seven-year zoning and legal battle over the future of the Georgetown waterfront. This dispute led to the designation and development of a new national park, the Georgetown Waterfront Park. A two-year controversy over the design of the complex, which included accusations of malfeasance by a D.C. agency, followed. Construction began in November 1981, and was complete in June 1986. Critical reception of Washington Harbour was mixed, but the public quickly embraced it.

Washington Harbour suffered management problems in its first two years, which led to the removal of one of its developers as property manager. The complex was sold to local real estate magnate Conrad Cafritz in 1988 in a controversial purchase-like lease agreement. Cafritz subsequently sold the property, which passed through the hands of six owners between 1990 and 2013, when it was once again put up for sale.

Washington Harbour has a first-of-its kind set of floodgates to ward off Potomac River floods. In 2011, a failure to use the floodgates properly caused a major flood, leading to a lawsuit and a $30 million renovation.

== Genesis of the project ==
=== Early studies ===
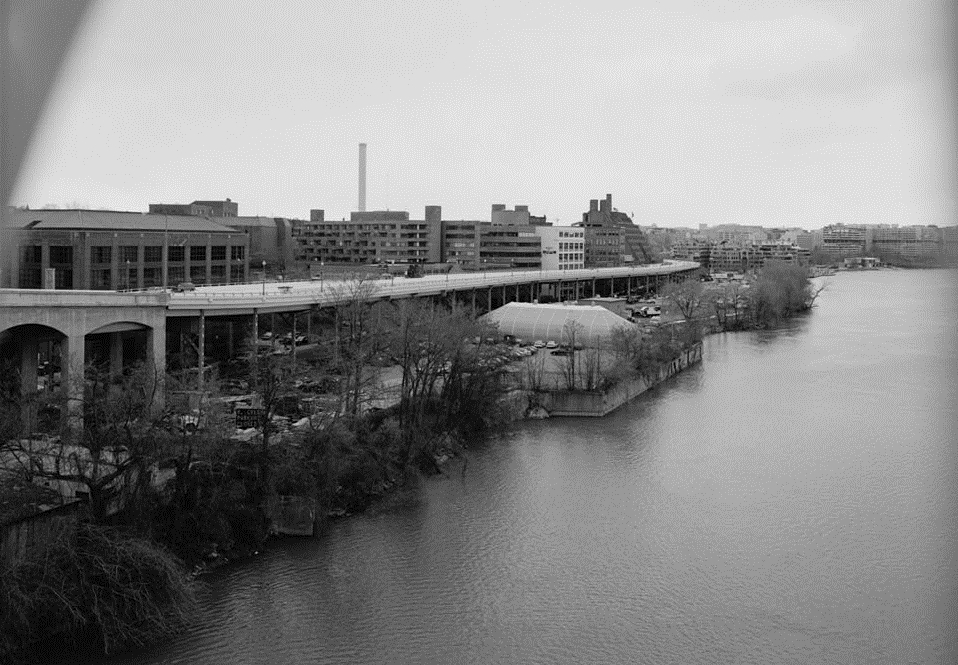
The Georgetown waterfront in 1967.

During the 1800s, the Georgetown waterfront was largely a commercial harbor. Most of the land was occupied by warehouses. Between 1900 and 1960, commercial river traffic declined sharply and the warehouses were replaced by coal gas, cement, steel, and other medium and light industrial manufacturing plants. By 1960, many of these plants closed, and the waterfront fell into disuse. A city-owned waste incineration plant, a waste-sorting facility, and construction-materials depot occupied portions of the site.

Between 1960 and 1970, five studies offered recommendations for redeveloping the waterfront. None was acted upon, in part because they—like other D.C. planning proposals of the time—proposed to build a highway along the river, which was strongly opposed by many D.C. residents, including those in Georgetown. A sixth study, commissioned in 1970 by the National Capitol Planning Commission (NCPC) and the Georgetown Citizens' Association (GCA), proposed not to build a highway but to demolish the 21-year-old Whitehurst Freeway. The study's authors said the freeway blocked vistas, inhibited development of the waterfront, was poorly engineered, and caused traffic back-ups at both of its ends. The report urged the city to bury the freeway in an enclosed trench and sell the air rights above it to developers or use it as parkland.

The 1970 study was received favorably by President Richard M. Nixon, who in April 1971 issued a message to Congress on the District of Columbia in which he called for "an overall preservation and development plan for the Georgetown waterfront" lest Georgetown's historic character be lost forever. Nixon's message provided a new impetus for planning in Georgetown, and in January 1972 the federal government funded a $250,000 study intended to spur zoning changes which would permit large redevelopment of the waterfront. Members of the study committee included the NCPC, GCA, the District of Columbia Highway and Traffic Department, the Department of Housing and Urban Development, the Department of the Interior, the Department of Transportation, and the United States Commission of Fine Arts (CFA).

=== Legal action over other construction projects ===
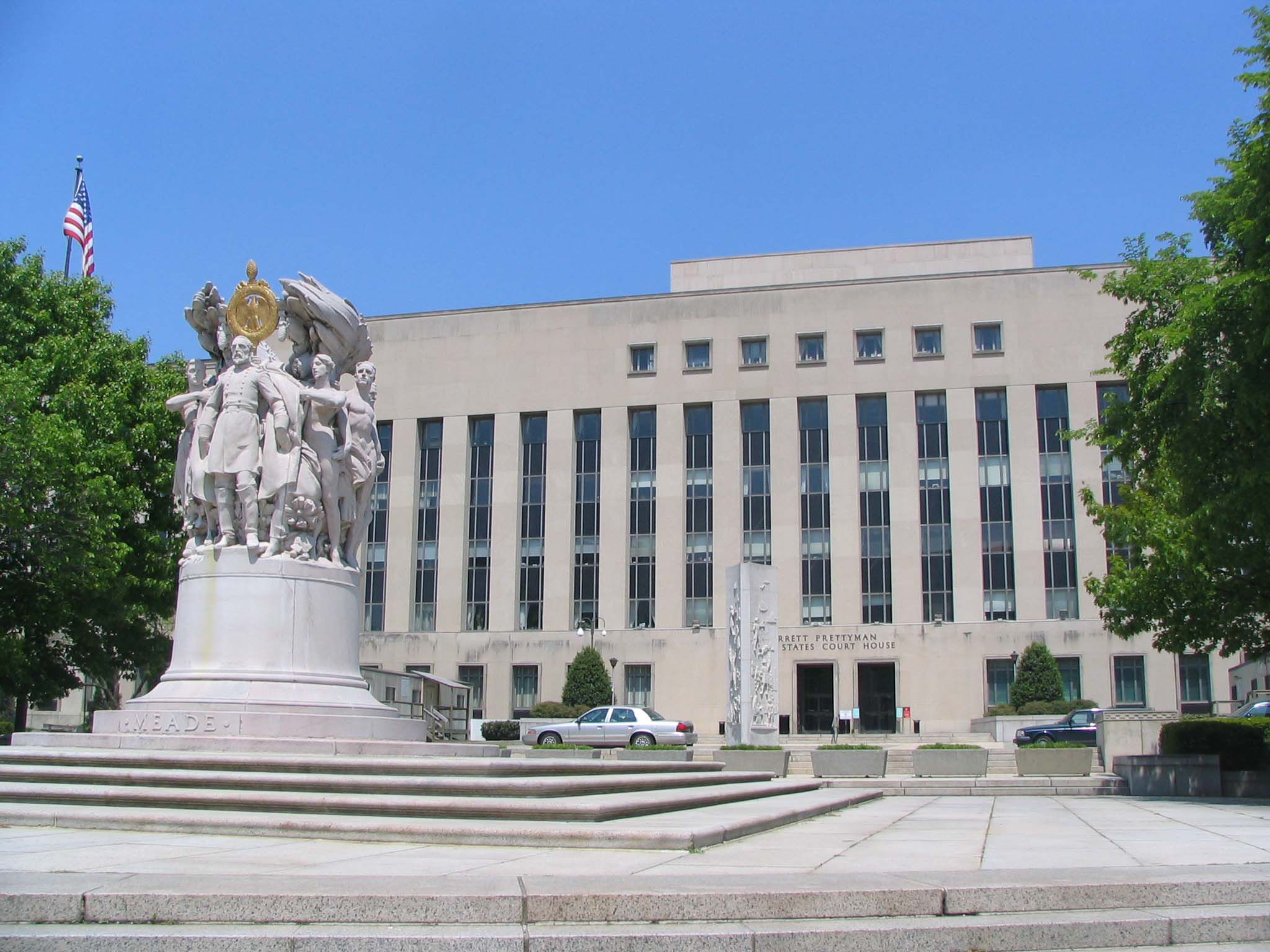
The U.S. Court of Appeals for the D.C. Circuit lifted the ban on construction on the Georgetown waterfront in 1973.

Some developers attempted to move ahead with construction before the federal study was finished, causing disputes that would eventually shape Washington Harbour. In April 1972, Georgetown Inland, a subsidiary of the Inland Steel Company, commissioned architect Arthur Cotton Moore to design an eight-story office building on company-owned land at 1055 Thomas Jefferson Street NW. But the CFA, which had statutory authority to approve the design and height of structures in the area, recommended against its construction for being too tall. On June 29, the D.C. Zoning Commission issued, without comment, a 120-day ban on all construction on the waterfront. The GCA argued for a ban on all construction in the area until the federal study was complete, but in August 1972 Georgetown Inland unveiled a plan to construct an $80 million complex of restaurants, hotels, office buildings, retail space, and a small harbor. Georgetown Inland argued that a construction ban, however temporary, would drive developers permanently away from the waterfront. The GCA sued to stop construction of the building, but the United States District Court for the District of Columbia refused its request on October 12. On September 29, the D.C. Zoning Commission lifted its June 29 ban and said that construction on the 100-acre (400,000 m^{2}) Georgetown waterfront could proceed.

The GCA appealed to the United States Court of Appeals for the District of Columbia Circuit. The court of appeals issued a temporary injunction banning construction, pending resolution of additional issues by the district court.

A preliminary version of the federal study was issued on November 2, 1972. Even though Georgetown Inland was proceeding with its plans (it now intended to construct two nine-story office towers), the federal study recommended that only mixed-use developments should be permitted on the waterfront. The report also recommended limiting structures to 40 feet (12 m) in height, although buildings of 60 feet (18 m) could be constructed in some places. This generated a second lawsuit by the GCA. The U.S. district court issued a second ruling in the construction case on November 18, and again allowed Georgetown Inland to proceed. GCA appealed, and the U.S. court of appeals reimposed its temporary injunction eight days later. The appellate court delayed a final ruling in the matter until February 1, 1973.

On February 6, the court of appeals extended its temporary injunction for 45 more days. It held that the D.C. Zoning Commission had improperly lifted its construction ban without providing a written justification. The court ordered the zoning board to issue that justification within 45 days. The zoning board provided its justification, and on May 8 the court of appeals lifted its injunction. In accepting the zoning commission's justification, the appellate court required that, going forward, the zoning commission must take sworn testimony and permit cross-examination of witnesses prior to making zoning decisions, and issue quasi-judicial written opinions outlining the reasons for its decisions. (The court ruling proved to be a watershed in improving city zoning decisions.)

== Zoning regulation changes ==
=== Zoning proposals ===
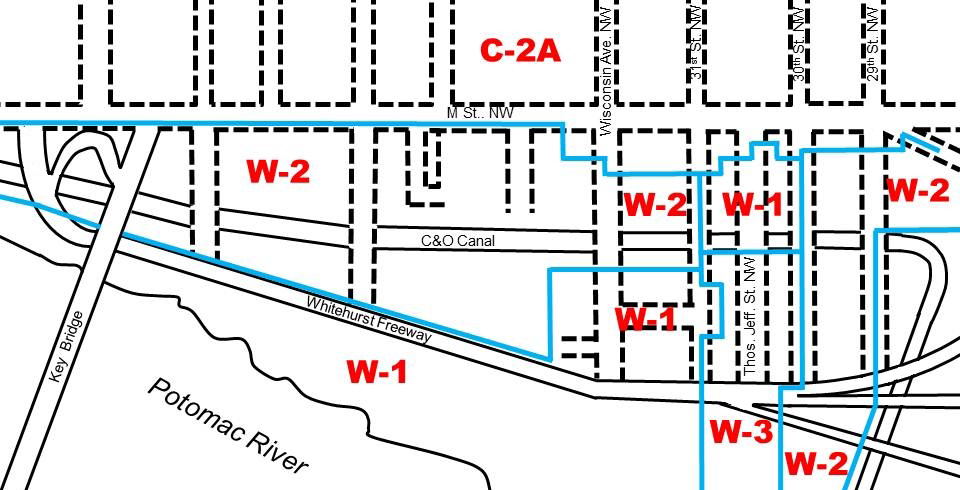
The Georgetown sub-zone zoning map approved by the D.C. Zoning Commission in November 1974.

The preliminary federal study recommended extensive zoning changes for the Georgetown waterfront, and the D.C. Zoning Commission acted immediately to implement these proposals. After public hearings on May 9, the zoning commission proposed new regulations on June 29. These rules permitted much more dense development, and established three sub-zones. In the W-1 area bounded by the Potomac River, 31st Street NW, Key Bridge, and K Street NW, buildings were restricted to six stories in height. The W-2 area bounded by 31st Street NW, K Street NW, Key Bridge, and the C&O Canal generally held buildings to six-stories as well. However, developers could seek exemptions allowing construction up to nine stories for mixed-use developments. In the W-3 area bounded by 30th and 31st Streets NW, the Potomac River, and the C&O Canal, buildings were permitted to reach nine stories. The square footage of a single building was also restricted in all three sub-zones, although this could be exceeded if the structure included more residential units.

The zoning plan was slightly changed in August. The W-1 area expanded a block and a half north of K Street NW and a block and a half west of 31st Street NW. The W-2 area expanded north to M Street NW as well as east to include a section bounded by the Potomac River, 30th Street NW, M Street NW, Pennsylvania Avenue NW, and 29th Street NW. The W-3 area above the C&O Canal was converted into W-1 zoned space. Public hearings on the revised plan began on August 6. The NCPC opposed the proposed regulations, arguing that it permitted buildings that were too high, did not regulate rooftop structures (such as penthouses or towers), provided too many exceptions for industrial use, and did not adequately protect historic structures. A group of local citizens and consultants known as the Georgetown Planning Group argued that the proposed rules permitted development that was too dense and too tall, and which would draw too much automobile and pedestrian traffic to the area. On November 15, the zoning board postponed action on the rezoning plan until the NCPC finished its regional planning exercise for the same area.

=== Zoning approval ===
Zoning of the Georgetown waterfront took a new direction with the establishment of home rule in the District of Columbia.

The zoning commission was governed by 1920 legislation, and its membership modified slightly by the 1967 reorganization of the city government into a mayor-council format. In 1974, its members were the District mayor, the chair and vice chair of the District of Columbia City Council, the Architect of the Capitol, and the director of the National Park Service. Under home rule legislation, however, the zoning commission membership would be a chair, vice-chair, and public member appointed by the mayor and subject to approval by the D.C. City Council; the Architect of the Capitol; and the director of the National Park Service. The District of Columbia Home Rule Act was due to come into effect on January 1, 1975.

In a surprise move, the lame duck zoning commission reversed course in late November 1974 and approved the proposed revised zoning rules for the Georgetown waterfront. The Washington Post reported that the rezoning process would have to begin again under the home-rule zoning commission, and there was little chance that the new commission would be able to approve anything like the proposed regulations. The existing zoning commission acted, the newspaper suggested, because it would suffer no political retaliation (having gone out of business), its actions could give the home-rule zoning commission political cover to retain the rules, and because its members believed there had been enough delay and consideration of the rules. Development, the old commission felt, had to proceed now or it never would. The GCA immediately sued to have the new zoning regulations overturned, and the D.C. Superior Court blocked all development in the area while the suit was pending.

=== The final federal consultant's study ===
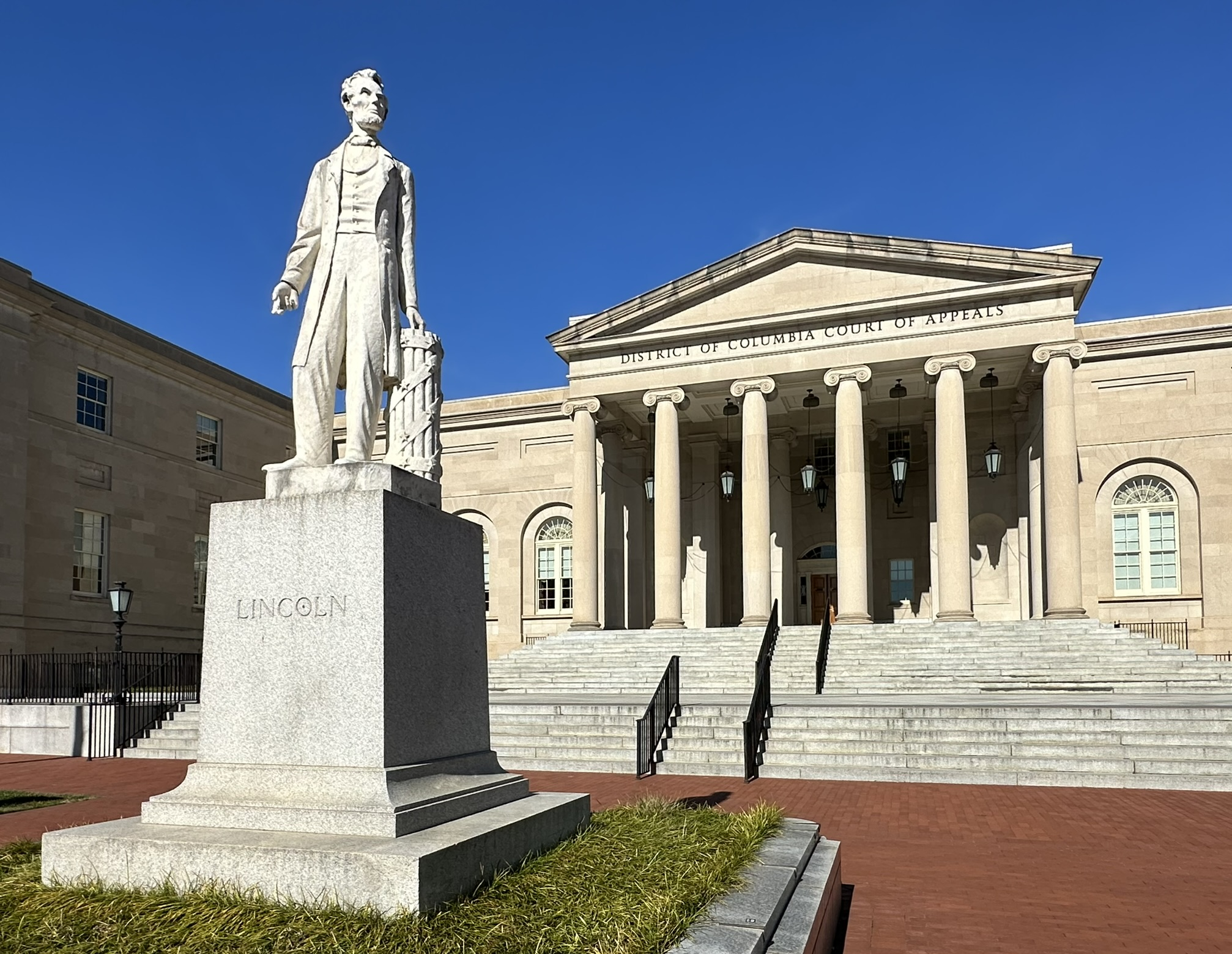
The D.C. Court of Appeals upheld the November 1974 zoning regulations which allowed construction to go forward on Washington Harbour.

On February 6, 1975, the final version of the federally funded consultant's study was issued. It recommended only low- and medium-rise buildings on the waterfront (40 feet (12 m) to 60 feet (18 m) high), rather than the high-rise structures (90 feet (27 m) high) approved by the D.C. Zoning Commission in November. It also recommended buildings with a smaller square-foot footprint. Although the NCPC did not immediately incorporate the report into its plans, it made it clear that it favored the report's conclusions.

With the zoning commission seemingly at odds with the NCPC, in early January 1978 the CFA proposed a resolution: The construction of two waterside parks and a large underground parking garage on the Georgetown waterfront. The city said it would try to implement the CFA's proposals, even though some city officials were reluctant to address the waterfront in such a piecemeal fashion.

With the GCA suit against the approved zoning changes still pending in April 1977, Papermill Associates (a partnership between the real estate firm of Holland & Lyons and rental car magnate Warren Avis) purchased the site of an unused waterfront paper mill (bounded by Cecil Alley NW, Grace Street NW, K Street NW, and Potomac Street NW) and began planning a $20 million townhouse condominium development. Meanwhile, Weissberg Development Corp. purchased the Wilkins-Rogers Company Flour Mill site (bounded by K Street NW, Potomac Street NW, 33rd Street NW, and the C&O Canal) for redevelopment into an $18 million mixed-use office and luxury apartment building. Both projects received CFA approval, even though construction could not yet proceed.

=== Final legal challenges ===
On November 2, 1977, the D.C. Superior Court ruled that the November 1974 zoning regulations had been properly adopted, even though they did not fit with the NCPC's master plan for the city. The GCA asked the court to issue a temporary injunction on construction in the area while they appealed the ruling. Then, in an unrelated case, the District of Columbia Court of Appeals issued a ruling on December 2 regarding zoning on Capitol Hill. The D.C. appellate court held that the D.C. Zoning Commission could not adopt decisions inconsistent with the NCPC's master plan. The GCA immediately refiled with the superior court, citing the Capitol Hill case and seeking to overturn the November 1974 zoning regulations.

The same day that the court of appeals issued its decision, Western Development Corp. announced the purchase of most of the area bounded by Wisconsin Avenue NW, M Street NW, Potomac Street NW, and the C&O Canal, as well as a small parcel on the opposite bank of the C&O Canal bounded by Wisconsin Avenue NW, Grace Street NW, and Potomac Street NW. The company said it would retain the historic Canal Warehouse and the historic building facades on Wisconsin Avenue, and construct a luxury shopping mall and south-facing condominia on the site. This project came the Georgetown Park shopping complex.

The final legal development occurred when, on October 17, 1978, the D.C. Court of Appeals ruled in Citizens Association of Georgetown v. Zoning Commission of the District of Columbia, 392 A.2d 1027 (D.C. App., 1978) that the November 1974 zoning regulations had been properly adopted even though they did fit with the NCPC's master plan. The decision essentially put an end to the GCA's attempt to prevent rezoning.

=== Creation of Georgetown Waterfront Park ===
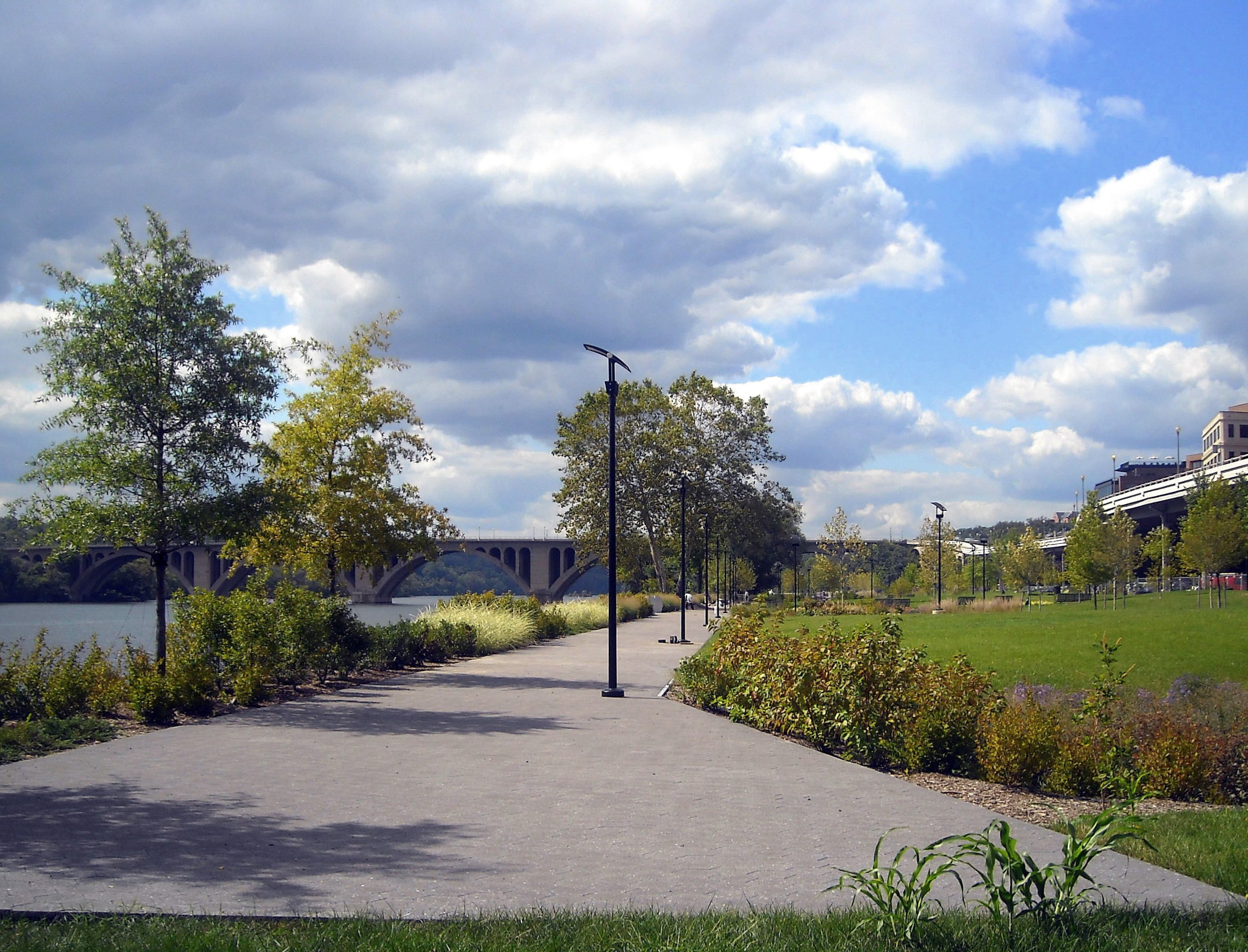
Georgetown Waterfront Park in 2008, from the entrance near Washington Harbour.

The D.C. Court of Appeals decision provided a major impetus to a new effort to retain a portion of the waterfront as parkland. In April 1979, the Georgetown Waterfront Task Force — an ad hoc group consisting of the NCPC, National Park Service (NPS), and D.C. Office of Planning and Development (a unit of the mayor's office) — issued a draft redevelopment plan for the area bounded by Rock Creek Park, the Potomac River, Key Bridge, and the C&O Canal. The plan (which built on the CFA's January 1978 proposal) called for a new park to be developed between 31st Street NW and Key Bridge along the Potomac River. The Chessie System railway, which owned the land, agreed to donate a 160-foot (49 m) wide strip next to the river for the park. Height restrictions for buildings immediately next to the park on K Street would be imposed, limiting structures to just 30 feet (9.1 m), while other structures could be 50 to 60 feet (15 to 18 m) in height. The plan reduced development in the area by 75 percent.

In March 1978, Senator Charles Mathias of Maryland introduced legislation in Congress to designate the entire area bounded by Rock Creek Park, Key Bridge, the Potomac River and the C&O Canal a national park. The controversial legislation would have forced all development in the area to cease. The legislation died, but in early 1979 Senator Mark Hatfield of Oregon introduced legislation requiring the NPS to buy just the Chessie System and Inland Steel land in the area and turn it into a national park. This legislation began to move forward in the Senate, which provided new urgency to settle the park issue on the waterfront.

On July 13, 1979, Secretary of the Interior Cecil D. Andrus, NCPC chairman David Childs, D.C. planning director James O. Gibson, and Western Develop Corp. president Herbert S. Miller signed an agreement to proceed with development of the area. The Chessie System turned over its strip of land for development of the park, and the NPS agreed to build a park there at a cost of $7 to $12 million. In addition, a trapezoidal portion of the northeast part of the waterfront area, consisting of land owned by the Chessie System, Western Development, Inland Steel, and other landowners, would be purchased by a joint venture owned by the Chessie System and Western Development. The joint venture pledged to build a $50 million complex of townhouse condominia, office buildings, and retail space in the area. The height of the structure would range from three to six stories. The development required the approval of the CFA, and D.C. City Council had to agree to cancel the unbuilt 30th Street, 31st Street, and Thomas Jefferson Street extensions (intended to reach the waterfront). Georgetown residents committed to turning the entire area into a park overwhelmingly opposed the agreement.

With this agreement, the boundaries of the Washington Harbor complex were set and design work began.

== Washington Harbour design proposals and disputes ==
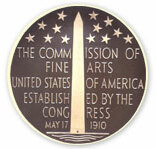
The U.S. Commission of Fine Arts (seal depicted) rejected the first design for Washington Harbour, but was enthusiastic about its second architectural design.

The Chessie System and Western Development hired GMR Limited, an architectural firm located in Rockville, Maryland, to design Washington Harbour. The company submitted its proposed design to the Commission of Fine Arts in the fall of 1979. This design was a six-story, squat, heavily massed set of buildings (connected by bridges on the upper level) which utilized as much of the development area as possible. The CFA voiced concern about the massing of the complex, and GMR Limited lowered its height to just three stories. The changes were not enough, however, and the CFA rejected the proposed design in December. A month later, Western Development hired nationally known architect Arthur Cotton Moore to redesign Washington Harbour. Taking up the suggestions of the CFA, Moore said he would use a variety of colors for the project and possibly design smaller buildings with more space between them. Meanwhile, city officials backed off their unequivocal support for the project. In addition, the NCPC ordered that an environmental impact statement (EIS) be drawn up for the various development and park proposals, a study which would take at least six months to complete. With the redesign and EIS requirements, Western Development officials said the start date for their project was being pushed from fall 1980 to March 1981. The company also gave a name to its partnership with the Chessie System: Washington Harbour Associates.

On March 5, 1980, Moore proposed a new design for Washington Harbour. The $60 million project in the postmodern style consisted of two curving buildings on the southern part of the parcel, facing the Potomac River. Five other buildings, separated by pedestrian paths, were planned for areas to the east, northeast, north, northwest, and west of these curved structures. About 60 percent of the total project was to be residential, consisting of 350 to 400 condominia. Retail space would occupy 320,000 square feet (30,000 m^{2}) of the project. An elliptical yacht basin was planned for the area embraced by the buildings, and a riverfront park was intended for the strip of land between the development and the river. Altogether, the project occupied just 3.43 acres (13,900 m^{2}), rather than the 5.9 acres (24,000 m^{2}) in the previous proposal. The GCA vehemently opposed the design. A week later, the CFA partially approved Moore's redesign. It did not, however, approve the project's height. The CFA said the project, at 86 feet (26 m) high, was too tall, and that it would not approve any building taller than 60 feet (18 m).

Moore quickly submitted a revised design. The redesign lowered the height of the project to 68.5 feet (20.9 m) (just five feet taller than the tallest building in Georgetown). The footprint of the complex was expanded back to 5.9 acres (24,000 m^{2}) and the residential and retail buildings moved closer to the river. Due to these changes, the overall size of the project declined to 700,000 square feet (65,000 m^{2}) from 750,000 square feet (70,000 m^{2}). The CFA approved the redesign's basic plan on April 8, 1980, although Washington Harbour Associates (WHA) was required to submit final architectural drawings to the CFA and prove that the National Park Service still planned develop the rest of the waterfront as a park. WHA meeting these two requirements would delay construction about a year.

GCA opposed the redesigned project as well. In November 1980, the GCA called for a two-year delay of the now $120 million project while a floodplain study was done. The GCA argued that the project was on such low land and so close to the water that it would regularly flood. Nine of the 13 D.C. City Council members sponsored a bill to ban construction on the project until the Federal Emergency Management Agency (which was already conducting a floodplain study of the area) was complete. Mayor Marion Barry opposed the legislation. Although no floodplain study requirement was imposed, another nine months passed while final architectural drawings and building permits were secured. By July 1981, the cost of the project had risen to $154 million (primarily due to inflation).

=== Historic Preservation Office delay ===
The start of construction on Washington Harbour was delayed for several weeks after Carol B. Thompson, director of the District of Columbia Office of Historic Preservation, made an unannounced visit to the site, drawing a lawsuit and a court injunction.

As part of the building permitting process, DCHPO was required to verify that the project conformed to the appearance, arrangement, building materials, color, height, style, and texture of the surrounding buildings and did not damage the character of the neighborhood. With the CFA having approved final architectural drawings and WHA having obtained assurances from the National Park Service regarding park construction, DCHPO approval was the last step required before the city would issue a building permit.

In late August 1981, Thompson visited the proposed construction site without notifying the GCA or WHA, a violation of DCHPO rules. On September 12, Thompson issued an order approving the project. When GCA learned of Thompson's site visit, it sued to enjoin issuance of her order, and she rescinded it.

In early October 1981, Thompson paid a second visit to the Washington Harbour site. This one conformed to DCHPO rules, but she was forced to hold a hearing in which GCA and WHA officials said that her previous visit had compromised the approval process. On October 22, Thompson reissued her order approving the project. GCA sued to overturn the DCHPO order. On November 4, the D.C. Court of Appeals issued a temporary injunction enjoining construction. The court lifted its order on November 14, concluding that the hearing showed that Thompson's actions had not irreparably harmed the DCHPO permitting process and that the second site visit had been properly held. The city said it would issue building permits within a week, and Washington Harbour Associates said it would begin construction immediately thereafter.

The court would issue its final rejection of GCA's lawsuit nearly a year later—on October 1, 1982, when construction was well underway.

== Construction of Washington Harbour ==
Construction on Washington Harbour began in November 1981 with demolition of an abandoned cement plant.

The George Hyman Construction Company of Bethesda, Maryland, was the general contractor; Zivan Cohen of the firm Tadjer-Cohen-Edelson was the structural engineer, and the landscape architect, James Urban.

By November 1983, the cement plant was gone, excavation of the foundations was complete, pilings for the buildings were being driven, and steel sheeting was being driven into the ground by the riverbank to help protect the site from water.

The cost of the project had also risen to $200 million, thanks in part to design changes during construction. In March 1983, WHA asked the United States Army Corps of Engineers to approve several things: the dredging of a channel in the Potomac that would lead to the elliptical boat basin in the center of the project, the addition of a floating dock, the construction of a seawall on the river's edge, and the use of Potomac dredge material to fill in the area behind the seawall. On this reclaimed land, the company intended to build a 700-foot (210 m) long boardwalk. The GCA and local rowing clubs opposed these requests, arguing that the boat basin and dock would attract too many powerboats that would threaten the many kayakers and scullers who used the area. Most of these proposals were withdrawn by November, when WHA abandoned the elliptical boat basin in favor of a fountain.

Washington Harbour Associates received financing for the project from KanAm Realty, a division of KanAm International (a German real estate development firm). Due to economic pressures, residential space in the complex had been turned into office space (for which higher rents could be charged). The amount of office space had jumped to 480,000 square feet (45,000 m^{2}) from 306,000 square feet (28,400 m^{2}), while the retail space shrank to 85,000 square feet (7,900 m^{2}) from 150,000 square feet (14,000 m^{2}) and residential space to 97,000 square feet (9,000 m^{2}) from 236,000 square feet (21,900 m^{2}). The number of condominia in the project dropped by 90 percent, although the remaining 38 units were built to be some of the most luxurious in the city. WHA intended to lease most of the retail space to restaurants, and had already leased space for a 1,000-seat facility to be designed by Warner LeRoy (then-owner of the famous Tavern on the Green). The remaining retail (a gourmet food shop, an office supply store, a pharmacy, etc.) would be leased to businesses catering to the needs of the condominium owners. The eastern tower was designed to accommodate retail and restaurants on the ground floor with office space above. The western tower was similar in design, except that the top floors contained condominia.

By May 1985, Washington Harbour was nearing completion. Contractors rushed to complete the floodgates at the base of the Washington Harbour towers in early November 1985 after the Potomac River, swollen by heavy rains, reached 7 feet (2.1 m) above flood stage.

One of the requirements of the complex's building permit was that it pay for an archeological assessment of undeveloped waterfront land. On the west side of the development (which was scheduled to become parkland), archeologists unearthed in summer 1985 the brick foundations and flooring of three buildings from the early 1800s. The ruins, as well as remains of a cobblestone street, were found 6 feet (1.8 m) down.

=== Completion and opening ===
On June 13, 1986, phase one of Washington Harbour — which consisted of the two curved towers and the five buildings attached to them — opened its doors. Seventy percent of the office space was leased (at top-of-the-market rates), and 32 of the 38 condominia were already sold. The complex included a $2 million "water dance" fountain designed by William Hobbs, and another $6 million to $7 million was spent on public spaces within the complex. Warner LeRoy announced that the name of his upscale restaurant would be "Potomac". Phase two of the project, which consisted of a hotel/office building on land between 30th Street NW and Rock Creek, was to begin construction in late 1986. But phase two was never completed. The land was sold, and the House of Sweden built on the site in 2006.

== Critical reception ==
=== Description of the complex ===
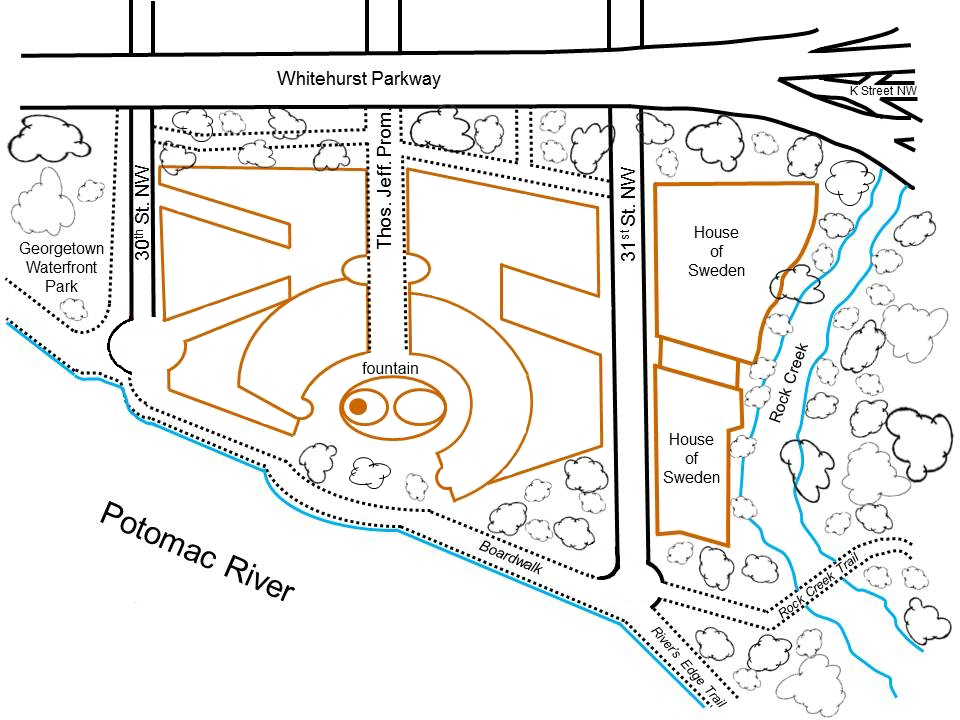
Map of the Washington Harbour complex as of 2013.

As constructed, the $200 million Washington Harbour complex consisted of five buildings with 23 facades. Each building is six stories high. The total interior footage was just under 1,000,000 square feet (93,000 m^{2}), although leaseable interior space was just 536,000 square feet (49,800 m^{2}). The main building consisted of two block long structures. The southern half of each building was curved, and these curved wings surrounded a large central fountain. This area was open on the southern end. Aligned on a north-south axis, the southern edge of the structure was parallel to the Potomac River (which angled southeast to northwest). Through the center of these two buildings ran Thomas Jefferson Promenade (the former Thomas Jefferson Street). Originally designed to be of equal height, the existence of residential space in the west tower (which had different floor-to-ceiling heights) left the two structures unequal. The landscaping of Thomas Jefferson Promenade was designed by Joe Brown and Michael Vergason of the landscape architecture firm EDAW, in cooperation with Arthur Cotton Moore Associates.

Washington Harbour drew on a postmodernist mix of Art Deco, Art Nouveau, Baroque Revival, Gothic Revival, Greek Revival, Renaissance Revival, Romanesque Revival, and Victorian architectural styles. The exterior walls were mostly brickwork (in beige and brown) and limestone (in pale beige). The brick was not even, but rather recessed and projecting and of varying geometric shapes. Some of the columns, buttresses, and pilasters used in the complex were structural, but many were not. Round and flat arches of varying width and height, brackets, incomplete cornices, gables, pediments, and decorative scrollwork were used throughout the complex. The roof featured fluted brick chimneys of varying height, adorned with corbels. Balconies and the rooftop terrace were edged with brick or metal parapets in a variety of styles. The roof consisted of curved metal set at various angles, and white-painted metal domes of various widths roofed the circular offices, round conference rooms, and rotunda-shaped living rooms below.

The shape, size, and style of windows and doors throughout the Washington Harbour complex were highly variable. Windows were single in some places, and horizontal ribbons in others. Wraparound windows often adorned corners, and sliding glass or French doors were sometimes used in place of windows. Windowsills, too, varied in color, height, material, shape, and style.

Entrances to the structure were somewhat less varied. Most exterior doors were glass. Door jambs were usually green metal but sometimes made of bronze or steel. Glass and metal canopies protected most doorways.

The facades varied widely:

- Columns of varying height supported upper floors on the Potomac River side of the complex, creating an extremely narrow, nonfunctional portico. The capital atop each column was vaguely Corinthian in style, made of shaped sheet metal, and contained concealed lighting fixtures. The south side of the complex also featured brick piers, pilasters, and pilaster/column combinations. Flying buttresses were used on the upper floors. The glass curtain wall behind which was the Potomac restaurant was decorated with ornamental metalwork similar to that found in Victorian cast-iron pavilions.
- The east facade consisted of tapered white columns, which framed large ventilation grills.
- The north facade consisted of a glass curtain wall of six bays and which sloped slightly inward. The rhythm, proportion, size, and spacing of the windows in each bay and on each floor was different.
- The west facade consisted of a glass curtain wall which sloped slightly inward. The facade projected outward (imitating bays and turrets) at points, and at points it featured a gabled roof. On the south corner of the building, a circular street plaza sliced into the sidewalk in the west (providing a few parking spaces) while cutting an arc into the facade of the building. This helped create a transition from the flat southern facade to the more diverse western facade.
- The facades facing Thomas Jefferson Promenade (the former Thomas Jefferson Street) featured a horizontal joint which was deeply recessed and rusticated. The projecting wall above the joint was supported by cantilevers.

Architect Arthur Cotton Moore said that massed, block-long building lines were necessary due to the need to use as much space as possible. To break up the monolithic, wall-like effect of this massing, each long facade was broken in multiple smaller facades and different architectural styles used to make the buildings visually interesting. Moore said he designed the walkways so that pedestrians see only one facade at a time, so consistency in architectural vision is maintained.

The pedestrian spaces around and weaving through the complex consisted of brick, ceramic, flagstone, and granite tiles. Thomas Jefferson Promenade was heavily landscaped. It also contained numerous benches, and the concrete planters along the promenade had lips purposefully designed to be wide enough to encourage seating. Cast-iron grillwork in the Beaux-Arts style covered street-level drains. Thomas Jefferson Promenade ended at the giant elliptical water-dance fountain, which contained a five-story high Greek Revival temple-like tower on the western side. A 600-foot (180 m) long boardwalk was built 6 feet (1.8 m) above the average water level, slightly overhanging the river.

=== Critical reception ===
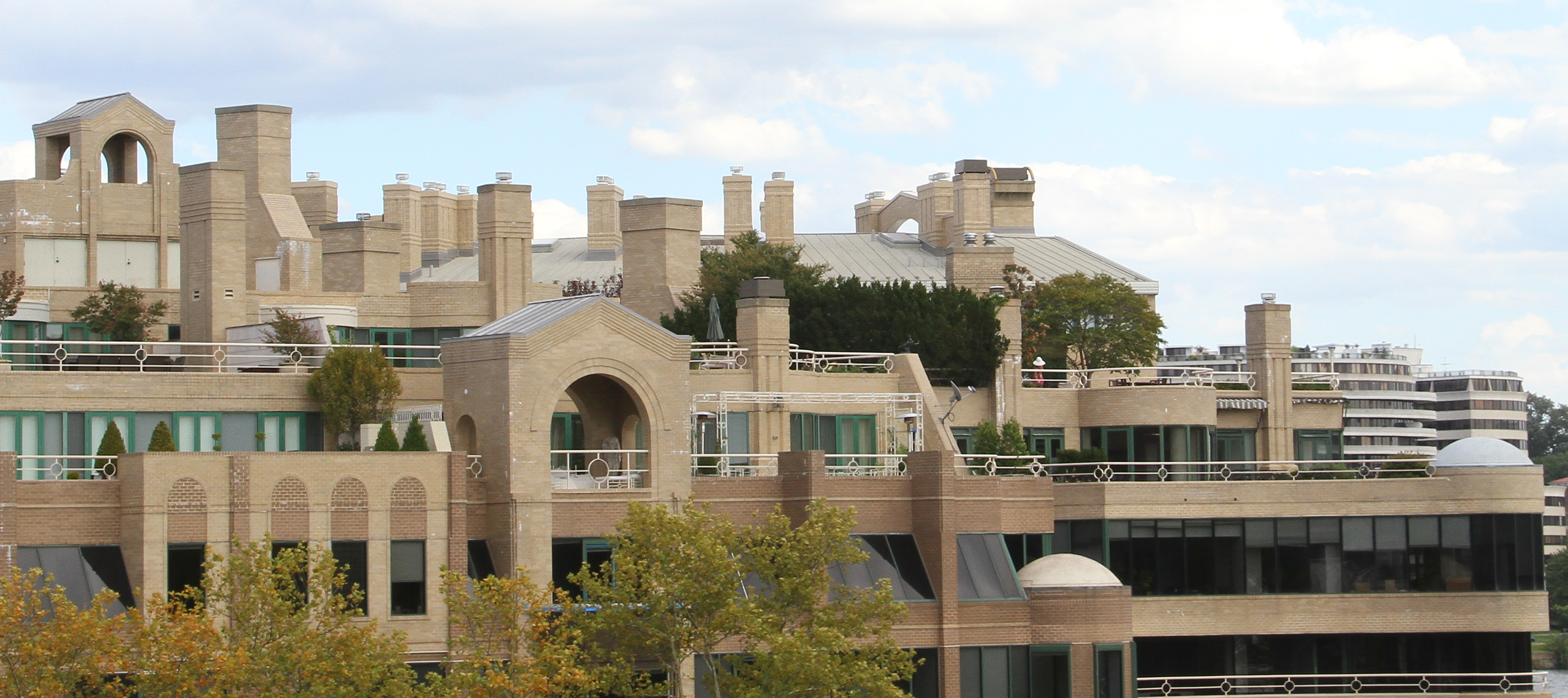
Upper floors of Washington Harbour, showing the wide variety of architectural elements Arthur Cotton Moore employed to make the complex visually interesting.

Architect Roger K. Lewis, writing for The Washington Post, generally praised the structure, calling it an "incredibl[y] diverse, complicated, at times overwhelming architectural collage". He called Moore's willingness to divide the complex with pedestrian walkways "a masterful stroke of urbanism" and praised its "architectural exuberance" — the way Moore fragmented the bulk of the buildings with recessed and projecting facades of widely different colors, materials, and styles. He also voiced strong approval for the way the complex was designed for wealthy tenants, and yet contained space for the public. However, he felt the building did not fit in with stylistically with the rest of Georgetown, even though Moore drew on the many architectural styles found there.

Washington Post architectural critic Benjamin Forgey was more equivocal. He called the structure "pop architecture [that] is proudly idiosyncratic", arguing that it failed as a piece of consistent architecture but succeeded in creating a unique and popular space. The overall impression, Forgey argued, was of disunity, although some elements (notably the rooftop chimneys and cupolas and the southwestern corner and western facade) worked very well together. Forgey had strong praise, however, for Thomas Jefferson Promenade and the strong sense of movement and vitality it created. Taken by itself, he said, the light tower in the fountain was also "the right object in the right place" and powerfully defined the elliptical plaza/fountain space. Even so, he found, its clean design didn't fit well with the "busyness" around it. Two years after the project opened, Forgey maintained his opinion that Washington Harbour was a "giant, busy architectural egg", but one "redeemed mightily by its fine urban design".

Others have had varying opinions of the project. Washington Post real estate reporter John Mintz disparaged it as "pop art" architecture. J. Carter Brown, director of the National Gallery of Art, derisively called it "Xanadu on the Potomac", while the author of the AIA Guide to the Architecture of Washington, D.C. felt it was a "curious concoction of architectural motifs" and "cartoonish" — and, overall, visually staggering. Architect Richard Saul Wurman called it "bombastic" and rife with "clunky flamboyance", but acknowledged that it provided superb access to the river. Architectural historians Pamela Scott and Antoinette Josephine Lee said the architectural elements looked "forced". Architect and Catholic University of America professor Peter Blake in 1987 derisively called Washington Harbour "theme-park architecture in search of an appropriate theme", and found it a "wacky, bizarre assemblage of columns, curves, battlements, domes, turrets, fountains, bollards, bastions, crescents, terraces, gun emplacements, alleys, promenades, boulevards, piazzas and more columns and columnets, plus too many other fantasies to mention or to describe". Although Blake called the complex "more High Tack than High Tech", he found it far superior to the bland, limestone-clad, boxy structures which usually are built in the city. Speaking in 1987, GCA board member Donald Shannon called it "a disaster, a collection of junk," and denounced it for being kitschy and for catering to yuppie consumerism. Washington Post reporter Maryann Haggerty, writing in 1998, called the complex "one of the city's most architecturally distinctive buildings".

Washington Harbour has been described as architecture that comes close to being Deconstructivist. Roger K. Lewis, a strong critic of deconstructivism, claimed the project has "mildly deconstructivist aspirations" because its architectural elements are fragmentary and arbitrarily grouped. Yet, he admits it avoids deconstructivism because it has an underlying rationale. Washington Post architectural critic Benjamin Forgey criticized the project on similar grounds. He argued that Moore's basic structural designs were "ingenious and compelling". But architectural style, Forgey said, is an afterthought and not "intrinsic" to Moore's building. Moore's stated rationale for Washington Harbour's look, he claims, is oversimplified and makes false linkages between ornamentation and human scale and between metal ornaments and modernity. Although Forgey does not use the word "deconstructivism", he pointed out that Washington Harbour lacked context and consistency.

The Washington Building Congress gave John J. Kirlin, Inc. its 1987 Craftsmanship Award for the plumbing work on the Washington Harbour fountain.

== Operations ==
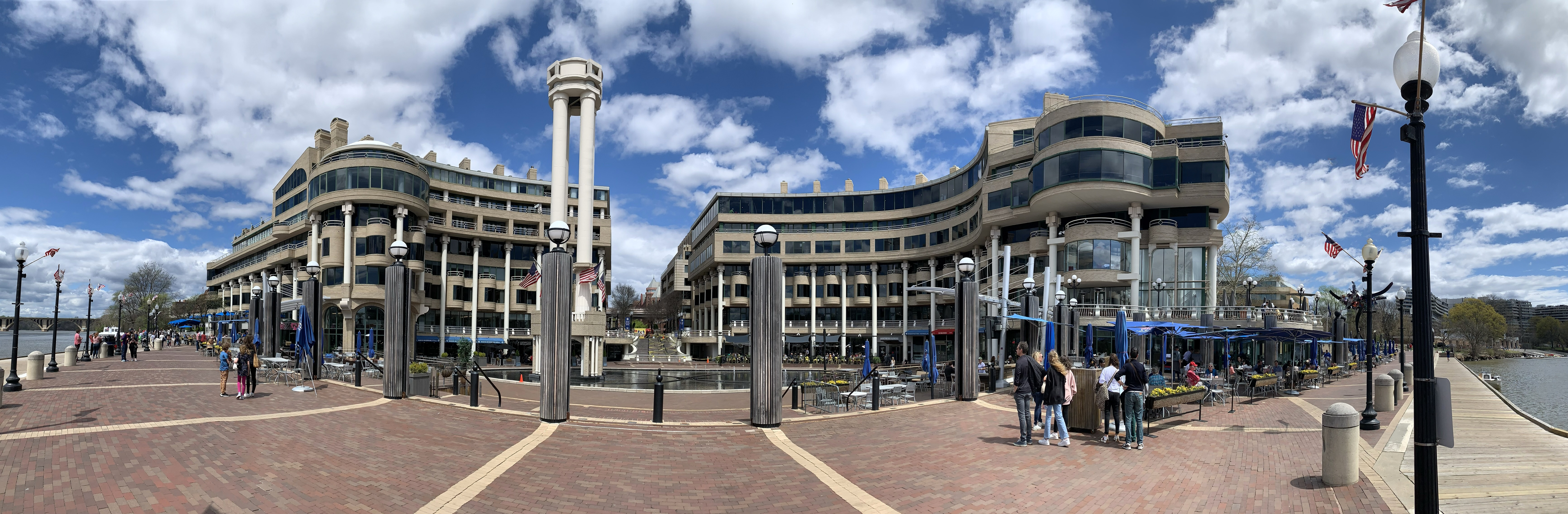
A spring day along the boardwalk in front of Washington Harbour in 2022.

Washington Harbour proved popular with the public. By spring 1987, the Japanese restaurant Hisago had opened, along with a pastry shop and delicatessen. Under construction were Tony & Joe's Seafood Place, China Regency (a Chinese restaurant), Jaimalito's Cantina (a Mexican restaurant), and a French restaurant. In the evenings, hundreds of businesspeople, cyclists, joggers, nearby residents, and tourists flooded the complex to enjoy the fresh air, water, and fountain. Rowers once worried that the complex would draw too much boat traffic, but scullers and rowers enjoyed a new-found popularity as their sport became visible to local residents who could watch them practice and compete from the Washington Harbour boardwalk. However, about 100,000 square feet (9,300 m^{2}) of the 560,000 square feet (52,000 m^{2}) of planned office space was not finished or occupied at the time the complex opened due to a lack of tenants.

In the fall of 1986, Western Development reduced the level of its investment in Washington Harbour. The company had won the right to develop Market Square, a $200 million mixed-use development project on Pennsylvania Avenue NW between 6th and 7th Streets NW. But Western Development failed to raise the necessary financing to build Market Square, and was forced to add as partners on the project the Texas-based real estate development company Trammell Crow and Dutch Institutional Holding Co., the largest public pension fund in the Netherlands. Subsequently, Western Development sold some of its investment in Washington Harbour to the other partners. This left CSX Corporation (the successor to the Chessie System) with 25.5 percent of the project, Western Development with 24.7 percent, KanAm with 9 percent, and a group of individual partners with 40 percent.

=== Western Development management troubles ===
Problems with the management of Washington Harbour first became public on October 27, 1987, when the complex's lead restaurant, Warner LeRoy's high-priced and luxurious Potomac, closed without warning. The Washington Post, quoting unnamed restaurant industry sources, said Potomac offered mediocre food at a high price, spent too much constructing the restaurant, was too large, and did not turn over diners fast enough. But LeRoy blamed Western Development, saying that tenant fees skyrocketed to $300,000 a year from $45,000 a year, trash collection was poor, landscaping was incomplete, fire alarms rang when there was no fire, management did not complete a covered walkway from the parking lot to the entrance, and the plumbing was poor. LeRoy further claimed that he spent $1 million on legal fees fighting Western Development (which managed the property). The Post quoted another unnamed restaurant owner in the building who agreed that Western Development was "a pain" to deal with. (A lawsuit filed by LeRoy against Western Development was settled out of court in November 1987.) By the end of October, other anonymous retail and office tenants were complaining to The Washington Post that they, too, encountered high unexpected costs and that Western Development was unresponsive to their complaints about physical plant problems. Several condominium owners in the complex also complained of rising costs, which included charges to cover real estate tax increases, fees for routine janitorial services (such as trash collection, sidewalk cleaning, and window washing), and parking garage charges. Some unidentified tenants also claimed they were misled about the project's operating costs, learning only too late that they did not cover all operating costs nor the real estate taxes; that space was often not finished until six months after the delivery date; that construction errors were not corrected; and that on-site employment (which retailers depended on for sales projections) would be 2,500 people but ended up being only 1,200 people (even though 85 percent of the complex was leased). The Washington Post quoted an unnamed industry source, who said Western "mistreated tenants" and "had no regard for their needs". But other tenants, such as Arthur Young & Co., Holcomb & Co., and Tony & Joe's said they were satisfied with Western Development's management of Washington Harbour. Western Development blamed the District government for rising costs, claiming the city had doubled the real estate tax on the complex in the past year. The rising operating fees caused the Hays Harmon gift shop to close and the owner of Cafe Rose to attempt to sell the business.

The closure of Potomac negatively impacted foot traffic at Washington Harbour, causing economic distress for other retailers. In December, Washington Harbour Associates asked a federal bankruptcy court to release Potomac from its lease, so that the complex could rent out to the space to another tenant.

Six months after the management problems were first made public, CSX Corporation fired Western Development and hired Faison Associates as Washington Harbour's property manager.

=== Sale to Conrad Cafritz ===
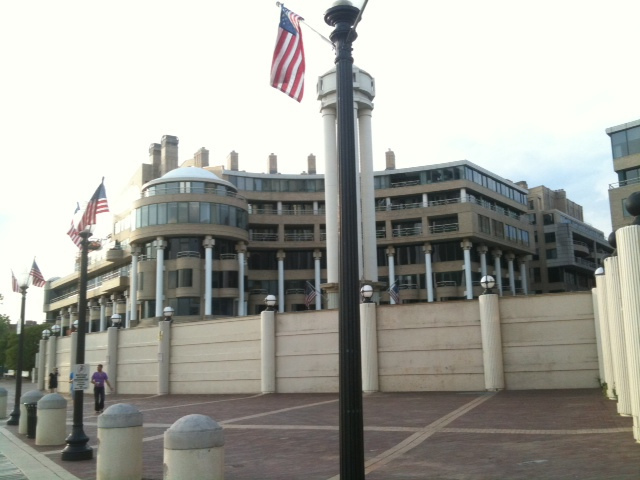
View of the Washington Harbour floodgates, in deployed mode, on the Potomac River side of the complex.

Washington Harbour was an increasingly troubled property as it entered its second year. More than 32,000 square feet (3,000 m^{2}) of the 65,000 square feet (6,000 m^{2}) of retail space and 38,000 square feet (3,500 m^{2}) of the property's 110,000 square feet (10,000 m^{2}) of restaurant and office space was vacant. (In comparison, the average office vacancy rate in the city was 8 percent.) Thirty of the project's 35 condominia were sold in the past year, and a $68 million lawsuit by Warner LeRoy was pending against the owners. The Washington Post, quoting unnamed real estate insiders, said Washington Harbour was having difficulty making money because WHA spent too lavishly on construction which rent could not support.

On August 29, 1988, local media announced that Conrad Cafritz, heir to the Cafritz real estate empire, had signed an agreement that gave him control of Washington Harbour. CXS quietly began trying to sell the property in 1987 (before the management controversy began), asking $225 million to $250 million for it. Negotiations with Cafritz began in summer 1987, and came to a quick resolution. Although no purchase price was publicly disclosed, the Washington Post reported that the sale was worth $200 million. (The city appraised the property at $116 million.) The deal was not an outright purchase. Under the terms of the agreement creating Washington Harbour Associates, CSX not only controlled the partnership but was also the sole landlord of Washington Harbour under a 198-year lease. CSX sub-leased the property to the tenants. Using a complex transaction involving a number of shell corporations, contracts Cafritz made with himself, and contracts Cafritz made personally with CSX Realty president Richard Beadles, Cafritz bought the land beneath Washington Harbour for $31 million. Cafritz obtained control (but not ownership) of the improvements to the property by purchasing CSX's interest in Washington Harbor Associates and taking over the 198-year lease. Cafritz then took further control of the property by leasing Washington Harbour to two new partnerships created by Cafritz solely for the purpose of controlling the property. Under the terms of these leases, Caftritz only took ownership of the improvements in 2182.

An unidentified group of Japanese investors helped finance Cafritz's acquisition, and the deal closed on December 22, 1988. (The condominia, which were tenant-owned, were not included in the purchase.)

The purchase-like Cafritz lease was controversial. Since no deeds for the improvements changed hands, Cafritz was able to avoid paying $3 million in transfer taxes and recordation fees. Since the District of Columbia did not tax leases, Cafritz only paid taxes and fees on the land, which amounted to only $620,000. Elected officials in the cash-strapped city were angered by the deal, and worried that numerous other purchase-like leases would soon wreak havoc on the city's income from transfer taxes. The controversy raged for several months until, in May 1989, the D.C. City Council approved legislation increasing the transfer tax and closing the purchase-like lease loophole.

The Cafritz deal stabilized Washington Harbour. Cafritz converted some retail space in the complex to office space (which paid higher rents), settled out of court in late 1988 the $68 million lawsuit filed by Warner LeRoy, and reduced rents for new tenants in the office space by 16 percent. Two months after Cafritz began his takeover of the property, chef Vittorio Testa opened a new restaurant, Leonardo da Vinci Ristorante, in a portion of the space formerly occupied by Potomac, Testa transformed the space from a bejeweled, chandeliered showroom into a quiet, softly lit restaurant. Leonardo da Vinci Ristorante opened in February 1989. It included a less expensive, more informal dining room and a carryout service on the lower level. In August 1989, Ark Restaurant Corp. announced it had signed a 15-year lease for a new restaurant, Sequoia, at Washington Harbour. The company said the mid-priced fare ($20 for dinner) and smaller size (550 seats, compared to Potomac's 800 seats) would make the new eatery profitable. Sequoia opened in September 1990. By mid 1990, Cafritz had leased much of the empty office space at Washington Harbour as well.

=== Successive ownership changes ===
Cafritz retained ownership of Washington Harbour for only two years. By 1990 Cafritz was having financial troubles and the Japanese wanted him out of the partnership. In June 1990, the Japanese exercised their contractual rights and, with the financing from Long-Term Credit Bank of Japan, bought out Cafritz's interest in Washington Harbour.

Washington Harbour continued to stabilize after the acquisition by the Japanese. The new ownership brought in Jones Lang Wootton USA (now JLL) as Asset Manager, Leasing Agent and Property Manager to reposition the property. All 35 condos finally sold (although about a third of them had been put on the market again), 85 percent of office space was leased, and a new Italian restaurant, Pasta Place, opened. The complex was also home to a rising number of free cultural events. By summer 1992, Washington Harbour was the home of the Potomac International Regatta, an outdoor jazz festival, and nightly entertainment in the summer by guitarists, steel drum bands, and string quartets. Additionally, six sculptures by John Seward Johnson II were installed in the boardwalk area. By May 1994, office space rentals edged up to 88 percent (but were among Georgetown's highest rents, at $32 to $34 a square foot), and major firms such as Hill & Knowlton and Swidler & Berlin took space. Potomac River Front also brought operating costs down by about 25 percent to just $10 per square foot.

In February 1988, Jones Lang Wootton USA brokered the sale of Washington Harbour to Crescent Real Estate Equities for $161 million. At the time of the sale, it was the highest price per square foot ever paid for an office building in Washington, DC. It was Crescent's first purchase of a Washington area building. Again, the sale did not include the tenant-owned condominia.

Crescent Real Estate owned Washington Harbour for three and a half years. In September 2001, Crescent sold Washington Harbour to Shorenstein Properties for $154.25 million or $287.67 per square foot.

Shorenstein Properties owned Washington Harbour for two and a half years. In March 2003, it sold the complex to Broadway Real Estate Partners for $185 million. Financing was provided by Lehman Brothers, an unidentified offshore investment bank, and several other private investors. The 19.5 percent increase in the price of the complex came from the rapid improvement in occupancy, which reached 99 percent (with less than 1 percent annual turnover) by 2003. Another 75 percent of the space was leased until 2007, and rents were no longer the highest in the area but in line with other downtown properties. New major tenants included the law firms Foley & Lardner, Collier Shannon Rill & Scott, and Orrick, Herrington & Sutcliffe.

After two years, Broadway Real Estate Partners sold Washington Harbour to Prudential Real Estate Investors in February 2005 for $220 million.

Although Washington Harbour was drawing "huge crowds" every evening and on weekends when the weather was warm, Prudential Real Estate Investors sold the complex in March 2010 to MRP Realty and the Rockpoint Group for about $244.5 million. Real estate insiders said Prudential may have needed cash for other, more lucrative investments. Additionally, vacancy rates at the complex had risen dramatically. Just 3.8 percent of the property was vacant in the second quarter of 2007, but 23.9 percent was vacant in the last quarter of 2009. MRP Realty dismissed the longtime property manager and began managing the complex itself.

=== 2011 flood and renovations ===
Washington Harbour suffered a serious flood on April 17, 2011. Heavy rains and a strong high tide caused the Potomac River to overflow its banks by 10 to 12 feet (3.0 to 3.7 m). With the floodgates either not up or only partially up (sources conflict as to their status), water began pouring into the parking garage, basement, and first floor of the complex at 7:00 a.m. All first floor tenants and all condominium residents were evacuated by the District of Columbia Fire and Emergency Medical Services Department (DCFEMS). The flood gates were finally raised at noon, and DCFEMS spokesperson Peter Piringer said the floodgates "would have...easily contained" the water had they been in place. MRP Realty later said it believed the floodwaters had crested and that putting up the floodgates was not necessary.

On April 19, a $5 million class action lawsuit was filed against MRP Realty on behalf businesses and employees which lost income due to the flood. The lawsuit said MRP Realty failed to raise the floodgates despite adequate warning. An additional 39 plaintiffs (most of them restaurant employees) joined the suit, which was refiled on June 15 in D.C. Superior Court to accommodate them. Talks to resolve the lawsuit were held in the fall of 2012, but broke down in October. Superior Court Judge Erik Christin dismissed the class action lawsuit on February 19, 2013.

On July 30, 2011, MRP Realty announced a $30 million renovation of Washington Harbour. The renovation plans, which were not yet vetted by the local Advisory Neighborhood Commission and city officials, added new restaurant space and additional outdoor dining space, and replaced elliptical fountain with a new 7,000-square-foot (650 m^{2}) fountain capable of becoming a 9,000-to-12,000-square-foot (840 to 1,110 m^{2}) ice rink (sources differed on the size) in the winter. MRP Realty said it hoped to begin the renovations in early 2012. MRP Realty executives said the renovation was not in response to the April flood, but had been planned since the company bought Washington Harbour in 2010. These renovation plans were subsequently approved by the relevant authorities. M. Arthur Gensler Jr. & Associates designed the plaza, fountain/ice rink, and exterior renovations, and Clark Construction was the general contractor. The fountain/ice rink opened in November 2012. The 11,800-square-foot (1,100 m^{2}) rink was the city's third skating rink, and its largest. It proved immediately popular.

In November 2012, MRP Realty announced it was investigating the feasibility of constructing either a six-story, 88-family residential building or a 120-room hotel on the wooded northeast corner of the Washington Harbour property. Neither structure would be more than 60 feet (18 m) high. D.C. Zoning Administrator Matthew Le Grant advised MRP Realty that city zoning regulations did not appear to block construction of the 70,500-square-foot (6,550 m^{2}) structure. Condominium owners at Washington Harbour opposed the development in January 2013, claiming it would harm their property values.

Washington Harbour announced on March 4, 2013, that chef Fabio Trabocchi would open a new 9,000-square-foot (840 m^{2}) restaurant, Fiola Mare, at Washington Harbour within the year.

=== 2013 sale ===
MRP Realty and Rockpoint Group put Washington Harbour up for sale in February 2013, with an asking price of $250 million. They sold the property in June 2013 for $370 million to Principal Real Estate Investors (PREI), a consortium of South Korean investors. In October, PREI contracted with two companies to assist it in leasing space. It hired Transwestern to lease office space, and Rappaport to lease retail space.

== Flooding operations ==
=== Floodgate design ===
At Georgetown, the Potomac River reaches flood stage when it is 7 feet (2.1 m) above its average level. At 8 feet (2.4 m), moderate flooding occurs. At 10 feet (3.0 m), major damage begins. The record for high water is 19.5 feet (5.9 m), set in 1889. A near-record of 17.72 feet (5.40 m) was reached during heavy rains in October 1942.

Washington Harbour was purpose-built close to the waterline. About 1970, the Department of the Interior commissioned Arthur Cottom Moore Associates to study the way 80 cities utilized their waterfronts. The study found that when cities used waterfronts for public use, they either erected "festival/market buildings" (where vendors occupy space temporarily) that are easily vacated or erected levees or seawalls to seal the river off from the land. Moore was determined to provide the public ready access to the Potomac River, and avoid both solutions.

To overcome the flooding problem, Moore incorporated a floodgate into Washington Harbour. The Sverdrup & Parcel engineering firm designed a floodgate system based on the barriers used to protect nuclear power plants. Fifty-seven floodgates surround the entire complex. The gates vary in size, with those closest to the river about 12 feet (3.7 m) in height and 8,000 to 10,000 pounds (3,600 to 4,500 kg) in weight. Those on other sides of the complex are smaller and lighter. The gates were designed to protect against a flood 17 feet (5.2 m) high. Each gate is stored in a below-ground slot, and must be raised into position between what appear to be decorative bollards by a hoist or small crane. A buried gas compressor then inflates seals on either side of the gate to create a seal between the gate and the bollards. The lowest (P2) level of the parking garage is designed to be purposefully flooded so that the below-ground water pressure keeps the gates upright.

The gates — the first of their kind in the world when built — take three to five hours to put in place. The decision to raise the gates is made by the management company, which contacts the National Weather Service's River Desk at Harper's Ferry, West Virginia. Generally speaking, water at Harper's Ferry takes about 36 hours to reach Washington Harbour. In 1996, the cost of raising the floodgates was about $18,000 per use. (A hydraulic lifting system was considered, but rejected as too costly given the limited use the gates would receive.)

=== Instances of flooding ===
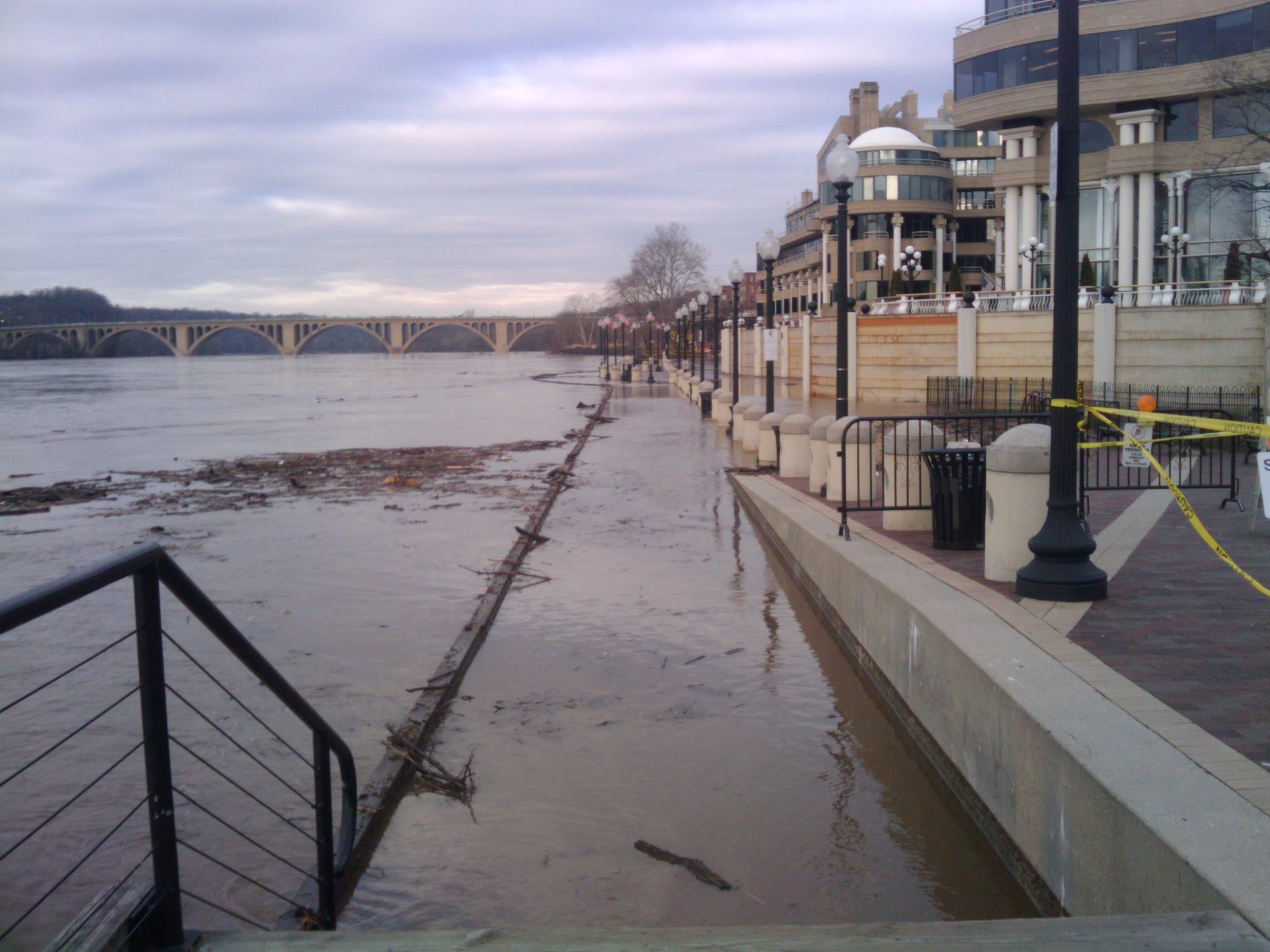
Flooding at Washington Harbour in January 2010 covers the boardwalk and part of the plaza, but is stopped by the floodgates.

The floodgates at Washington Harbour have been used at least 11 times between 1986 and 2012. These include the following:

- April 17–19, 1987 — Heavy rains caused the Potomac River to rise by 3 feet (0.91 m) on April 17. The floodgates were raised as a precaution. The Potomac was 8 feet (2.4 m) above normal on April 19, which was the worst flooding since the gates were first used in November 1985. The boardwalk was covered with water.
- March 30, 1994 — The next reported use of the floodgates was on March 30, 1994, when the Potomac River crested at 10.3 feet (3.1 m) due to melting snowpack and heavy rains. Floodwaters came 30 feet (9.1 m) inland, and were 6 to 8 inches (15 to 20 cm) high at the floodgates. The boardwalk, in disrepair due to contact with ice in February, received additional damage.
- January 20, 1996 — Melting snowpack and heavy rains again caused the Potomac to rise 13.8 feet (4.2 m) above normal, the highest level in 25 years. Washington Harbour was surrounded by water, but the floodgates prevented any damage.
- September 10, 1996 — Hurricane Fran caused the Potomac River to rise 12.1 feet (3.7 m) above normal, again surrounding Washington Harbour with water. Once more, the floodgates protected the complex.
- September 5, 1999 — The remnants of Hurricane Dennis caused Washington Harbour to raise its floodgates after extensive flooding was predicted. However, these forecasts were in error, and the boardwalk was barely covered with water.
- September 17, 2003 — Heavy rains from Hurricane Isabel caused the Potomac River to rise 13.75 feet (4.19 m) above normal. Even though Washington Harbour raised its floodgates, at least one restaurant in the complex stayed open. About 3 feet (0.91 m) of water covered the boardwalk, but it did not reach the floodgates. After a heavy thunderstorm on September 23, Washington Harbour raised the floodgates again even though they had just been taken down. Some water seeped into Tony & Joe's Seafood restaurant before the gates were in place.
- June 27–28, 2008 — Flash flooding due to extremely heavy rain led Washington Harbour to raise its floodgates. But despite predictions of flooding, water barely covered the boardwalk.
- January 27, 2010 — An early snowmelt and ice dams on the Potomac River caused the Potomac River near Washington to flood. But although the floodgate were raised, water never reached the floodgates. It only covered the boardwalk and a few feet of the plaza.
- April 17, 2011 — Washington Harbour failed to raise floodgates after torrential rains, which caused massive flooding in the complex.
- May 2011 — A week of heavy rain led to flood warnings along the middle and lower Potomac River. Washington Harbour, beginning to recover from the significant flood of April 2011, raised its floodgates. No flooding past the boardwalk occurred.
- October 29–30, 2012 — The passage of Hurricane Sandy over Washington, D.C., led Washington Harbour to raise its floodgates early. The Potomac River crested at 9 feet (2.7 m) above normal, but water did not reach the floodgates.
