= Arthur Cotton Moore =

American architect (1935–2022)

- Born: April 12, 1935; Georgetown, Washington, D.C., U.S.
- Died: September 4, 2022 (aged 87); Washington, D.C., U.S.
- Education: Princeton University, Princeton University School of Architecture
- Occupation: Architect
- Spouse: Patricia Moore
- Projects: Washington Harbour, restoration and modernization of the Thomas Jefferson Building and John Adams Building of the Library of Congress, the Old Post Office, and the Cairo Hotel in Washington, D.C.
- Website: https://web.archive.org/web/20210303055816/http://arthurcottonmoore.com/about

Arthur Cotton Moore (April 12, 1935 – September 4, 2022) was an American architect who was notable for the restoration of Washington Harbour and modernization of the Thomas Jefferson Building.

Moore began his professional practice in 1965 and was best known for expanding the purview of the country’s nascent Preservation Movement, from the restoration of historic manor houses to re-purposing urban industrial structures. His first project––Canal Square, in Washington D.C.’s Georgetown neighborhood––was the earliest recognized manifestation of combining an old mercantile building with major new construction.

Moore was also known for the Washington Harbour development on the Potomac River in Georgetown, Washington, D.C., the Goh Annex of the Phillips Collection also in Washington, D.C., and the renovation and modernization of the Thomas Jefferson and John Adams buildings of the Library of Congress, the Old Post Office building on Pennsylvania Avenue, and the renovation of Washington D.C.'s tallest residential building, the Cairo Hotel.

== Early life ==
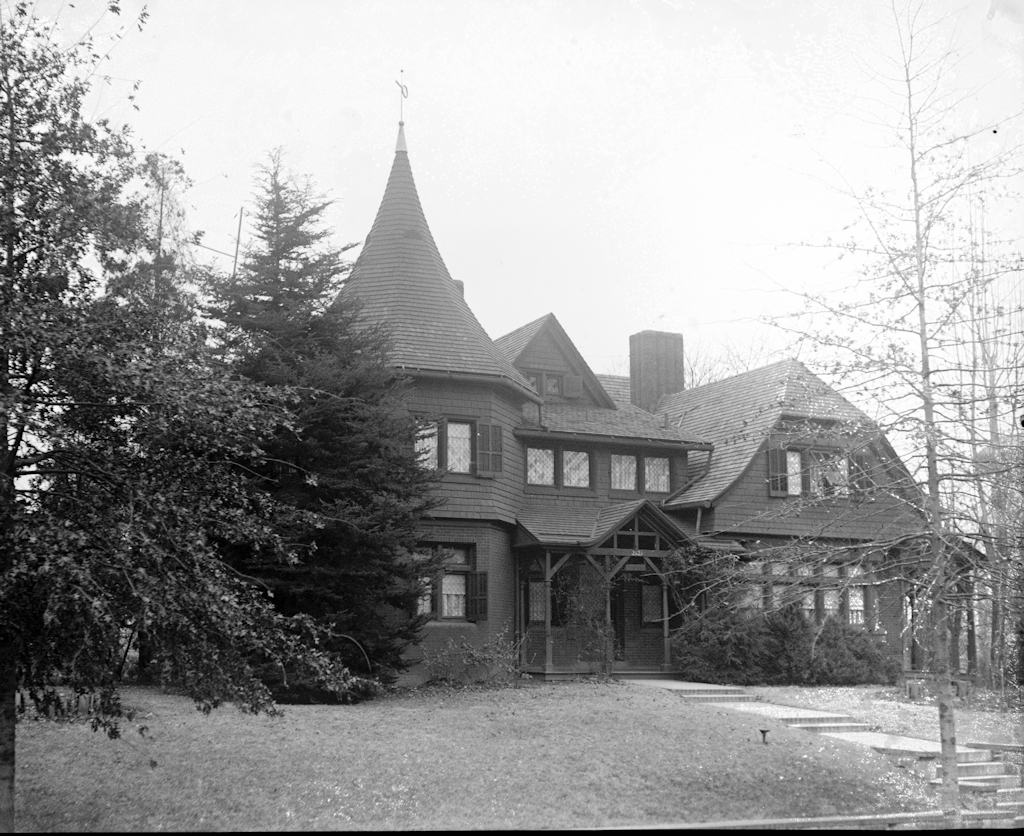
"Tanglebank," Arthur Cotton Moore's childhood home.

Arthur Cotton Moore spent his early years at “Tanglebank,” his grandparents’ Victorian house off Connecticut Avenue in the Kalorama neighborhood of NW Washington, D.C., now the site of a new People's Republic of China building providing housing for its embassy personnel.

Moore’s father, Captain Charles Godwin Moore, Jr., served during both World Wars. His mother was the granddaughter of Thomas Monroe Gale, whose house in the Kalorama neighborhood is now the Myanmar Embassy.

Moore graduated in St. Albans School, Washington, D.C. In 1958, Moore graduated cum laude in Princeton University. Moore studied architecture Princeton University School of Architecture, M.F.A. before starting his career in 1965.

== Career ==
- Skidmore Owings & Merrill: New York. Summers (1956–1958)
- Ketchum & Sharp: New York. (Summer 1959)
- Satterlee & Smith: Washington, D.C. (1960–1961)
- Chloethiel Woodard Smith & Associates: Washington, D.C. (1961–1965)
- Arthur Cotton Moore/Associates: Washington, D.C. (1965–2022)

=== Style ===
Moore described his architectural style in his non-preservation work as Modernism with Baroque sensibilities. Some have referred to this style as “post-postmodernism.” It is a lighter, even an entertaining modern interpretation of the exuberant style that flourished in Europe from the middle of the 17th century to the early 18th century. ''People are tired of endless grid-crunching,'' Moore said. ''Baroque deals with modern design's fear and loathing of the curve - just what I think is missing in modern design.''

=== Notable projects ===
- Canal Square in Georgetown, is a landmarked 19th-century warehouse and the former home of the Tabulating Machine Company, a direct precursor of IBM. It was re-adapted with new construction in 1970 at a cost of US$2.5 million. Located alongside the Chesapeake and Ohio Canal in the then-neglected industrial waterfront area, the project repurposed the warehouse by joining it with a sympathetic modern addition, bringing new life to the area. This led to similar programs across the country in a practice that became known as “adaptive reuse,” using existing building equity in a strategic way as an alternative to the devastation brought about by urban renewal and other economic development programs. Eighty-four articles on Canal Square were published in national and international newspapers, magazines, and books.
- Washington Harbour on the Georgetown waterfront (Washington, D.C.)
- The US$80 million restoration and modernization of the Thomas Jefferson and John Adams Buildings of the Library of Congress (Washington, D.C.)
- Renovation of the Old Post Office building, completed in 1982 (Washington, D.C.)
- Madeira School, an early solar-energy building (Washington, D.C.)
- The Cairo Hotel, an 1894 building and the tallest privately owned building in Washington, D.C., remodeled for US$2.7 million from a neglected hotel to a profitable condominium
- The Foundry, along the C&O Canal in Georgetown, Washington, D.C., included an existing historic foundry together with new construction.
- The Phillips Collection renovation and the Goh Annex (Washington, D.C.)
- Bedford-Stuyvesant Restoration Center (Brooklyn, NY)
- Foxhall Crescents (Washington, D.C.)
- Cathedral of St. John the Baptist (Charleston, South Carolina)
- Lobby, entrance canopy, and Rizik’s Pavilion. 1100 Connecticut Avenue, NW, Washington D.C.

=== National awards for architecture and furniture design ===
Since 1965, Moore received 70 Design Awards including:

- 1977: The American Institute of Architects, in accordance with the judgment of its Honor Awards Jury, presented an Honor Award to Arthur Cotton Moore/Associates for achievement of excellence in Architectural Design of Canal Square (June 1977)
- 1999: The American Institute of Architects, in accordance with the judgment of its Honor Award Jury, presented an Honor Award for Architecture to the Thomas Jefferson Building of the Library of Congress, Washington, D.C. for Excellence in Architectural Design by the Architect of the Capitol and Arthur Cotton Moore/Associates, Associate Architect. The Library of Congress, Owner. (May 1999)
- 1999: The American Institute of Architects and The American Library Association presented this Award of Excellence to the Architect of the Capitol and Arthur Cotton Moore/Associates, Associate Architect, for the Thomas Jefferson Building of the Library of Congress in recognition of Distinguished Accomplishment in Library Architecture. (June 1999)
- 1972: Architectural Record Magazine’s National Award for Residential Design for Avon Place, Washington, D.C.
- 1977: Architectural Record Magazine’s National Award for Residential Design for Harris House, Arlington, VA
- 1980: Architectural Record Magazine’s National Award for Residential Design for Bernstein House, Washington, D.C.
- 1990: Architectural Record Magazine’s National Award for Excellence in Design for the Industrial Baroque Furniture Series
- 2004: The Society of Professional Journalists, Dateline Award for Excellence in Local Journalism for the "Big Apple Attack" published in the Washingtonian Magazine

=== Group architectural exhibitions ===
- 1981/1982: Cooper-Hewitt Museum: Suburbs. Foxhall Crescents
- 1983: Columbia University Center for the Study of American Architecture. American Architecture: Innovation and Tradition
- 1985: The Catholic University of America, Architecture School: Current Work
- 1988: The Athenaeum, Alexandria, Virginia. A Decade of Washington Architecture
- 1988: The National Building Museum. Best Addresses
- 1990: The National Building Museum. Give us your Best
- 1991: The National Building Museum. Visions and Revisions
- 1991: Columbia University. Donations to the Avery Library Centennial Archive: Contemporary Architectural Drawings

=== Honors and distinctions ===
- Projects have been published in over 2,800 articles in magazines and newspapers throughout the United States, Europe, the U.K., South Korea, Australia, Japan, and in several books
- Elected as a Fellow of the American Institute of Architects (A.I.A.) (1979)
- Included since 1980 in the international compilation Contemporary Architects, published by St. James Press, London
- Included in Wikipedia's List of Notable Architects, a list of well-known individuals with a large body of published work or notable structures
- Included in American Architects: A Survey of Award-winning Contemporary Architects
- U.S. Trade Mission: State Department Representative to Belgium, Switzerland, and the Netherlands (1973)
- Listed in Who's Who in America since 1980
- “Washingtonian of the Year,” Washingtonian Magazine (January 1981)
- “Washington D.C.: The Making of a Capital,” Honorary Advisor to The Columbia Historical Society (1986)
- The Power Elite: The 100 Most Influential People in Private Washington, Regardie's Magazine (January 1988)
- Distinguished Community Service Award, The Princeton Club of Washington (1988)

=== Lectures ===
- 1975: Smithsonian Institution. Seven Lectures on Architecture and Planning. Washington, D.C.
- 1978: Producer’s Council. “The Architect and the Developer Working Together.” Chicago, IL
- 1978: The Smithsonian Institution. “The Architecture of the Absurd.” Four-part series.
- 1979: Columbia University.Graduate School of Architecture and Planning. “Recent Work.” New York, NY
- 1979: AIA Grassroots North Meeting. “Recent Work.” Washington D.C.
- 1979: University of Maryland. Graduate School of Architecture and Planning. “Recent Work.”
- 1979: North Carolina State University. School of Architecture. “Recent Work.” Raleigh, NC
- 1979: Trinity College. Annual Guest Lecture. Dublin, Ireland
- 1979: University of Texas.School of Architecture. “Recent Work.” Austin, TX
- 1979: Smithsonian Institution. “Buildings Reborn.” Washington, D.C.
- 1980: AIA Nebraska. “Current Work.” Omaha, NE
- 1980: University of Wisconsin. “Current Work.” Milwaukee, WI
- 1982: University of Nebraska.“Current Work.” Lincoln, NE
- 1982: The Annual Henry Hornbostel Memorial Lecture. “Current Work.” Carnegie-Mellon University. Pittsburgh, PA
- 1982: Smithsonian Institution.“Squabbles in the City.” Washington, D.C.
- 1982: University of Kentucky. “Current Work” Lexington, KY
- 1982: Smithsonian Institution. “Residential Architecture.” Washington, D.C.
- 1983: Institute for Urban Design. Fifth International Conference on Urban Design. “Georgetown Waterfront.” Washington, D.C.
- 1983: The Metropolitan Club.“Book and Author Dinner.” “Current Work.” Washington D.C.
- 1984: Northern Virginia Builder’s Association. “Current Work.”
- 1984: Howard University School of Architecture. “Current Work.” Washington, D.C.
- 1984: Society of Real Estate Appraisers. “Old Post Office.” Washington, D.C.
- 1984: Washington-Alexandria Center for Architecture, Extension of Virginia Polytechnic Institute. “Current Work.” Virginia.
- 1985: Mid-Atlantic APA Regional Conference. “Waterfront Development.” Washington, D.C.
- 1985: The Hirshhorn Museum. “A Retrospective Lecture Marking 20 years of Practice.”
- 1985: Smithsonian Institution. Tour of Arthur Cotton Moore Projects
- 1985: The Board of Trade.“Current Work.”
- 1986: AIA Grassroots ’86. “Old Post Office.”
- 1986: D.C. Bar Association. (Real Estate, Housing and Land Use Division) “Current Work.” Washington, D.C.
- 1986: The Committee of 100 on the Federal City. “The Portals Project.”
- 1986: Capital Design Week. “The Washington Design Center.”
- 1986: American Planning Association. “The Portals.”
- 1987: Masonry Institute. “Current Work.”
- 1988: Purdue University School of Landscape Architecture. “Current Work.” Indiana, IL
- 1988: Tulane University School of Architecture. “Current Work.” New Orleans, LA
- 1988: American Society of Appraisers. “Waterfront Development.”
- 1989: Virginia Masonry Council. “Arthur Cotton Moore Projects.” Richmond, VA
- 1989: Landscape Architecture Magazine. “Forum on Urban Plazas.” Maryland
- 1990: Urban Waterfronts ’90. The Waterfront Center.
- 1991: Construction Specifications Institute. “Library of Congress Restoration Tour”
- 1992: Bethesda-Chevy Chase Rotary Club. “Selected Projects.” Maryland
- 1993: Howard University School of Architecture. “Art, Architecture, Urban Design.” Washington, D.C.
- 1994: D.C. Building Industry Association.“Redoing Lobbies: Renovation Design Choices.”
- 1995: M-Day 1995.Masonry Institute of Michigan/AIA Michigan. “Masonry in Architecture.” Grand Rapids, MI
- 1995: Rosslyn Renaissance. “Rosslyn Waterfront.”
- 1996: Washington Building Congress. “Pennsylvania Avenue.” Washington, D.C.
- 1996: Chesapeake AIA. “Current Work” Annapolis, MD
- 1997: Rosslyn Renaissance.“Rosslyn Waterfront”

The international publicity generated by the many facets of the Washington Harbour Complex––Architecture, Urban Design, residential/office/commercial uses, a visionary flood control system, fountains, and its siting on the Potomac River––prompted requests from specific groups for a combination slide presentation, guided tour, and Q&A session:

- 1985: The National Building Museum (October 27)
- 1985: The National Building Museum (November 9)
- 1986: AIA Washington Chapter (November 22)
- 1986: Representatives of the Isle of Dogs, London Council
- 1987: The Corcoran Gallery of Art (April 4)
- 1987: Representatives of the City Council. Liverpool, England
- 1987: Representatives of the Ministry of Bonn, West Germany
- 1987: Columbia Historical Society (September 26)
- 1987: Brick Institute of America (November 16)
- 1987: Representatives of Parliament. Frankfurt, Germany
- 1988: American Society of Appraisers (June 28)
- 1988: American Society of Landscape Architects (July 13)
- 1988: The Waterfront Center (September 24)
- 1988: American Planning Association (October 28)
- 1988: Howard University School of Architecture (November 19)
- 1988: Representatives of the South Korean Government (December 7)
- 1989: The National Building Museum (March 25)
- 1989: Potomac River Basin Consortium (April 8)
- 1989: The National Building Museum (April 15)
- 1989: American Society of Landscape Architects (July 13)
- 1989: Israeli Architects Association (October 20)
- 1991: The Town Council of Lyon, France (April 8)
- 1991: AIA ACSA National Convention (April 9)
- 1991: The National Building Museum (April 27)
- 1991: AIA National Convention (May 18)
- 1993: University of Osaka, Graduate School of Global Architecture (June 21)
- 1994: The Brick Institute of America (November 14)
- 1996: The Brick Institute of America (November 11)

== Master planning ==
- “Master Plan of the National Mall, Expanded for the 21st Century” (2017) was published in Moore’s book “Our Nation’s Capital: Pro Bono Publico Ideas” (2017), the Washington Business Journal (January 2018) and Washingtonian Magazine (May 2018).
- Master Planning Policy Papers for New Towns. U.S. Department of Housing and Urban Development (1969)
- Master Planning Research on Urban Waterfronts. Project No. C-2141 (1971). Supported under the Title II provisions of the Water Resources Research Act of 1964 and funded by the Office of Water Resources, U.S. Department of the Interior. The goal was to introduce master planning to urban waterfronts, as an incentive to the then-awakening efforts to recharge the United States’ cradle of development. Bright, Breathing Edges of City Life: Amenity Benefits of Urban Water Resources was the first definitive look at this specific development effort, and was the best-seller on the list of Government Printing Office publications at that time.
- Developer Master Plans for the ownership of the land, with the intention of phased implementation:
  - Camp Luckett. Route 7. Fairfax, Virginia: 200 acres
  - Davis Tract. Montgomery County, Maryland: 75 acres
  - Salt Pond. Bethany, Delaware: 1,000 acres
  - Forest Glen. Montgomery County, Maryland: 25 acres
  - The Palisades. Arlington, Virginia: 15 acres
  - Radnor Tract. Ballston, Virginia: 5 acres
  - The Portals. Washington D.C.: 10 acres
  - The Georgetown Waterfront. Washington, D.C.: 10 acres
  - Gwynebrook. Towson, Maryland: 75 acres
  - Warfield/Kline. Frederick, Maryland: 6 acres
  - Baker/Kane. Charleston, South Carolina: 50 acres
  - Baker Tract. Renley Point, South Carolina: 35 acres
  - Shirlington Tract. Arlington, Virginia: 30 acres
  - Shoreham Tract. Washington D.C.: 10 acres
  - Minglewood Farms. Nashville, Tennessee: 800 acres
  - 400 Block, Schenectady, New York:4 acres
  - The Rockefeller Estate. Washington, D.C.: 25 acres
  - Arts Council. Winston-Salem, North Carolina: 3 acres
  - Old Ford Plant. Alexandria, Virginia: 10 acres
  - The Thomas Cannery. Gaithersburg, Maryland: 3 acres
  - Fortune Parc. Montgomery County, Maryland: 48 acres
  - Doubleday Property. Garden City, Long Island: 18 acres
- Central Business District Master Plansfor city governments and downtown business groups, with the intention of phased implementation geared towards economic revitalization. Included in most of these was identification of potential developers, and a detailed strategy to bring the plans to reality:
  - Baltimore, Maryland: 40 blocks
  - Petersburg, Virginia: 40 acres
  - Norfolk, Virginia: 50 acres
  - Fort Wayne, Indiana: 6 blocks
  - Rockville, Maryland: 420 acres
  - Columbus, Georgia: 100 blocks
  - Nashville, Tennessee: 162 acres
  - York, Pennsylvania: 100 acres
  - Colmar Manor, Maryland: 15 acres
  - Dearborn, Michigan: 6 blocks
  - Myrtle Beach, South Carolina: 70 acres
- Tourism Master Plans for state governments. Large-scale projects done in the 1960s, all of which were geared to economic development through creation/invention of a tourism industry:
  - The Town of East St. Louis, Illinois
  - Ski industry for West Virginia
  - Cooperative Resort Town, Puente al Mar, Puerto Rico
  - Frank Holten State Park, Illinois
  - The South Texas Triangle
  - Nine Counties, Northeast Development District, Arkansas
  - Eureka Springs, Arkansas
  - Arkadelphia, Arkansas
  - Ten Year Development Plan of the Bahama Islands
  - Red Carpet Country, Oklahoma
  - Bourne, Massachusetts
  - Nassau, Bahamas

== Painting ==
=== Solo exhibitions ===
- 1990: Industrial Baroque (Painting and Furniture). Barbara Fendrick Gallery. New York. (February 22 to March 31, 1990)
- 1990: Industrial Baroque (Painting and Furniture). Barbara Fendrick Gallery. Washington D.C. (April 5 to 28, 1990)
- 1991–92: Facades (series). Hokin Kaufman Gallery. Chicago, Illinois. (November 1991 to January 1992)
- 1993: Urban Stories (series). Galerie Gasnier Kamien. Paris, France. (April 6, 1993, to July 31, 1993)
- 1995: Visions of the Future (series). National Technical Museum, Prague, Czech Republic in cooperation with the Fund for Arts and Culture in Central and Eastern Europe. (March 9 to April 30, 1995)
- 1995: Visions of the Future (series). The Museum of Architecture, Wroclaw, Poland in cooperation with the Fund for Arts and Culture in Central and Eastern Europe. (September 7 to October 8, 1995)

These following articles on the solo exhibitions were published in newspapers and magazines between 1989 and 1995:

- The New York Times. June 15, 1989 (Barbara Gamarekian)
- Regardie’s Magazine. January 1990
- The New York Times. March 15, 1990 (Suzanne Slesin)
- The Washington Post. April 5, 1990 (Jane Stonesifer)
- The Washington Post. April 7, 1990 (Benjamin Forgey)
- Dossier Magazine. June 1990
- Trump’s Magazine. June 1990 (Lesa Griffith)
- Architectural Record Magazine. September 1990 (Karen D. Stein)
- Washington Home & Garden Magazine. Winter. 1990
- Avery Library Centennial Drawings Archive. 1991. “Retrofitted Window.” San Francisco:
- Pomegranate Press.
- Art & Antiques Magazine. November 1991 (Carol Vogel)
- Gay Chicago Magazine. December 19, 1991 (Justin H. Sunward)
- Le Generaliste. June 1993 (Chantal de Rosamel)
- Jardin des Modes. June 1993 (Nicole Bamberger)
- Demeures Chateaux. June/July 1993 (Michel de Loye)
- Listings: D’Architectures. April 1993
- Le Moniteur Architecture. April 1993
- Connaissance des Art. May 1993
- L’Oeil. May 1993
- BAT Magazine. France. May 1993
- The Washington Post. “Big Sky Motel.” October 14, 1993
- Frontier Magazine. “Big Sky Motel.” Winter 1994
- Prace. March 13, 1995
- Express. March 13, 1995
- Svobodne Slove. March 14, 1995
- Dobry Vecernik. March 15, 1995
- The Washington Post. March 16, 1995
- Dobry Vecernik. March 20, 1995
- Dobry Vecernik.March 30, 1995
- Prace. March 31, 1995
- Zn Noviny. April 5, 1995
- In: Hospodarske.April 7, 1995
- Kvety. April 7, 1995
- Atelier. April 13, 1995
- Vystrizek Z Tisku. April 21, 1995

=== Group exhibitions ===
- 1990: National Building Museum, Washington, D.C., “Industrial Baroque” Furniture. Side Table (October 1990)
- 1991: Columbia University, New York, Miriam and Ira D. Wallach Art Gallery. Retrofitted Window (April 1991)
- 1991: Chicago International Art Exposition
- 1992: Chicago International Art Exposition
- 1993: "Art by Architects", Washington, D.C., AIA/Share our Strength Auction.Big Sky Motel (October 21, 1993)
- 1993: The Corcoran Gallery of Art, Friends Auction. Washington D.C. Wet Paint (November 5, 1993)
- 1993: "East/West Tangent", Cologne, Germany. Curated by Francoise Friedrich. SoHo Art Gallery and In the Eighth Year (November 10 to 20, 1993)
- 1994: "Art by Architects", Los Angeles. AIA Convention. Balcony Supported by Ganged Metal Tube Brackets (May 13, 1994)
- 1994: American Embassy Kuwait. Art in Embassies Program: Lookout Tower and Wide Flange Cornice with Pipes and Sheet Metal Dentils (June 1994)
- 1994: The Corcoran Gallery of Art, Friends Auction. Washington, D.C. Ready to Talk (October 28, 1994)
- 1995: The Corcoran Gallery of Art, Friends Auction. Washington D.C. Seaside Motel (October 27, 1995)

== Writing ==
=== Books ===
- 1973: Foreword to Historic Buildings of Washington, D.C. Pittsburg: Ober Park Associates, Inc.
- 1998: The Powers of Preservation: New Life for Urban Historic Places, New York: McGraw-Hill.
- 2015: Interruption of the Cocktail Hour. A Washington Yarn of Art, Murder, and the Attempted Assassination of the President, Create Space Independent Publishing.
- 2017: Our Nation’s Capital: Pro Bono Publico Ideas, Washington, D.C.: International Arts & Artists.
- 2018: Washington Comiks: An Irreverent Look at the Absurdities of Our Nation's Capital, as Portrayed in 50 paintings, to be published by International Arts & Artists. 2018

=== Magazines ===
Journal of the American Institute of Architects:

- 1965: “Politics, Architecture and World Fairs.” Cover article. (April)
- 1979: Book Review. “The Revolutionary New Corridor-Free Systems.”
- 1979: “Adaptive Abuse”
- 1980: “The Retreat into Architectural Narcissism”

“The Pennsylvania Avenue Plan.” St. Albans Bulletin, May 1965

“Advise and Consult.” Library of Congress Information Bulletin. Vol. 56, No. 9, 5-11. May 1997.

The Weekly Standard:

- “Storm Warnings. Architectural Change is Coming–and It ain’t gonna be pretty.” (Venice Biennale), February 7, 2005.
- “Lines in the Sand. Art and Commerce in Sunny Florida.” (Art Basel Miami Beach), March 12, 2007.
- “China by Design. On a clear day you can see the People’s Architecture” April 28, 2008

Washingtonian Magazine: (Contributing Editor on Urban Affairs, 1965–1978)

- 1965: “Last Resort Architecture”
- 1965: “Subways are for People”
- 1966: “Wanted: A HUD with Vision”
- 1966: “The Architecture of Zoning”
- 1966: “The Washington National Airport boondoggle”
- 1967: “Sound and Fury at the FAA”
- 1967: “The Restoration Game”
- 1967: “Transportation to Dulles Airport”
- 1967: “The Day Commissioner Tobrinop saw a Kiosk”
- 1967: “A Proposal to Solve the National Airport Problem: The Airline Terminal Building”
- 1969: “Washington’s Waterfronts: 44 Miles down the Drain”
- 1970: “Economic Home Rule for the District of Columbia”
- 1972: “A No-Cost Solution to the Airport Problem”
- 1972: “An Offer to Buy National Airport”
- 1973: “Take this New York”
- 1974: “Saving the Willard”
- 1986: “The Bunkerization of Washington”

== Personal life ==
Arthur Cotton Moore's son is Greg Moore, a theoretical physicist at Rutgers University. Moore died of Pulmonary fibrosis on September 4, 2022 at the age of 87. His remains are buried in Oak Hill Cemetery, Washington, D.C.
