= Anne S. K. Brown =

American historian

- Born: Anne Seddon Kinsolving; March 25, 1906; Brooklyn, New York
- Died: November 21, 1985 (aged 79); Newport, Rhode Island
- Education: Bryn Mawr School
- Occupations: Historian and collector of military memorabilia.
- Known for: Anne S. K. Brown Military Collection.
- Spouse: John Nicholas Brown II (m. 1930; died 1979)
- Children: 3, including J. Carter
- Parent(s): Arthur B. Kinsolving; Sally Bruce Kinsolving
- Relatives: Lee Kinsolving (nephew)

Anne Seddon Kinsolving Brown (1906–1985) was an American historian, socialite, and collector of military memorabilia who married into the prominent Rhode Island Brown family, founders of Brown University.

== Early life ==
Anne was born on March 25, 1906, in Brooklyn (Note: Some sources say she was born in Baltimore, where her family moved when she was an infant.) to Arthur B. and Sally Bruce Kinsolving. When she was six months old her family moved to Baltimore where her father took the position of rector at Old St. Paul's Episcopal Church. Subsequently her father became Bishop of Baltimore. She was the sister of the Arthur Lee Kinsolving, rector of Trinity Church, and later, St. James' Episcopal Church in New York. Arthur Kinsolving was the father of Lee Kinsolving (1938–1974), the actor.

She attended Bryn Mawr School in Baltimore, graduating in 1924. For the next several years she worked as a journalist for the Baltimore News, writing on a variety of topics including music, theater and art.

== Career ==
Anne Brown began collecting lead toy soldiers during the couple's year-long honeymoon trip to Europe in 1930. Eventually her interest expanded dramatically to a large collection of military memorabilia, which on her death became the Anne S. K. Brown Military Collection. Beyond collecting artefacts, she was a general historian, co-founding the Company of Military Historians in 1949. She was one of the few women military historians. She also wrote many books and articles.

In 1962, she was given an L.H.D degree from Brown University. In 1965 she lectured on military history at the University of California.

== Personal life ==
In 1930, she met and married John Nicholas Brown II, a Brown family heir who eventually became Assistant Secretary of the Navy (AIR) from 1946 to 1949. Together, Anne and John had three children:

- Nicholas Brown (b. 1933), a captain in the U.S. Navy who served as the director of the National Aquarium in Baltimore from 1983 to 1995, who married Diane Verne
- John Carter Brown III (1934–2002), who became director of the National Gallery of Art, and was married to Constance Mellon Byers (1942–1983) (daughter of Richard King Mellon), and later, Pamela Braga Drexel (former wife of John R. Drexel IV).
- Angela Bayard Brown (b. 1938), who married Dr. Edwin Garvin Fischer (b. 1937) in 1963, grandson of Edwin Louis Garvin.

Anne Brown died at her home "Harbour Court" in Newport, RI, on November 21, 1985.
