= Company of Military Historians =

American non-profit organization

The Company of Military Historians is a non-profit organization in the United States whose mission is to disseminate "information on the uniforms, equipment, history, and traditions of members of the Armed Forces of the United States worldwide and other nations serving in the Western Hemisphere." It was organized informally in 1949 by its co-founders H. Charles McBarron, Jr., Harold L. Peterson, Frederick P. Todd, Anne S. K. Brown, J. Duncan Campbell, and Detmar H. Finke. It was formally organized in 1951 as the Company of Military Collectors and Historians and shortened its name in 1962 to its present version. From its inception, the organization has been made up of not only historians, but artists specialing in historical depictions of soldiers, uniforms, battles and similar illustrations. Among its members have been George Woodbridge, who is better known as an illustrator for Mad Magazine, and Fred Ray, who worked for DC Comics.
