= John Walker (curator) =

American art curator

- John Walker, by Yousuf Karsh
- Born: December 24, 1906; Pittsburgh, Pennsylvania, United States
- Died: October 16, 1995 (aged 88); Amberley, West Sussex, England, United Kingdom
- Education: Bernard Berenson
- Alma mater: Harvard University
- Occupation: Art curator
- Known for: director of the National Gallery of Art, Washington, D.C.

John Walker III (December 24, 1906 – October 16, 1995) was an American art curator, and the second director of the National Gallery of Art, from 1956 to 1969.

== Life ==
Walker received an undergraduate degree in art history from Harvard University in 1930, where he studied with Paul J. Sachs. He formed the Harvard Society for Contemporary Art, with Philip Johnson, Lincoln Kirstein, and Edward Warburg. He studied at Villa I Tatti in Florence with Bernard Berenson, and served as professor and assistant director of the American Academy in Rome from 1935 to 1939.

Walker became chief curator of the National Gallery of Art in 1939 and was involved in identifying works of art looted by the Nazis following World War II. In 1956 he was named director of the National Gallery, succeeding David E. Finley Jr., and remained in the position until his retirement in 1969. During his tenure at the gallery, Walker cultivated donor relationships with collectors such as the Mellon family, Joseph Widener, Armand Hammer, and Chester Dale; his significant acquisitions included Rembrandt's Aristotle with the Bust of Homer, Fragonard's La Liseuse, El Greco's Laocoon, and the Ginevra de' Benci by Leonardo da Vinci. Walker was the author of six books, including Bellini and Titian and Titian at Ferrara, and an autobiography, Self-Portrait with Donors. Like his predecessor, David Finley, Walker served on the U.S. Commission of Fine Arts, from 1967 to 1971.

In 1961, Walker hired J. Carter Brown as his assistant. He retired in 1969, and lived in Florida, Fishers Island, New York, and England.

== Works ==
- National Gallery of Art, Washington, D.C., New York: Harry N. Abrams, 1963, and subsequent American and European editions
- Self-Portrait with Donors: Confessions of an Art Collector. Boston: Little, Brown and Company, 1974, ISBN 978-0-316-91803-9
- Joseph Mallord William Turner. New York: Harry N. Abrams, 1976; concise edition: New York: Harry N. Abrams, 1983
- Portraits: 5,000 Years. New York: Harry N. Abrams, 1983
