= H. Charles McBarron Jr. =

American artist (1902–1992)

- Born: October 3, 1902; Chicago, Illinois
- Died: April 21, 1992 (aged 89); Chicago, Illinois
- Education: Art Institute of Chicago
- Known for: Illustrator
- Notable work: Illustrated books: Military Uniforms in America; Soldiers of the American Revolution: A Sketchbook, and many others
- Patrons: Founding member, Company of Military Historians

Hugh Charles McBarron Jr. (October 3, 1902 – April 21, 1992) was an American artist. Known for his wide body of work featuring the United States Armed Forces, he is considered by many to have been the "dean of military illustrators".

== Biography ==
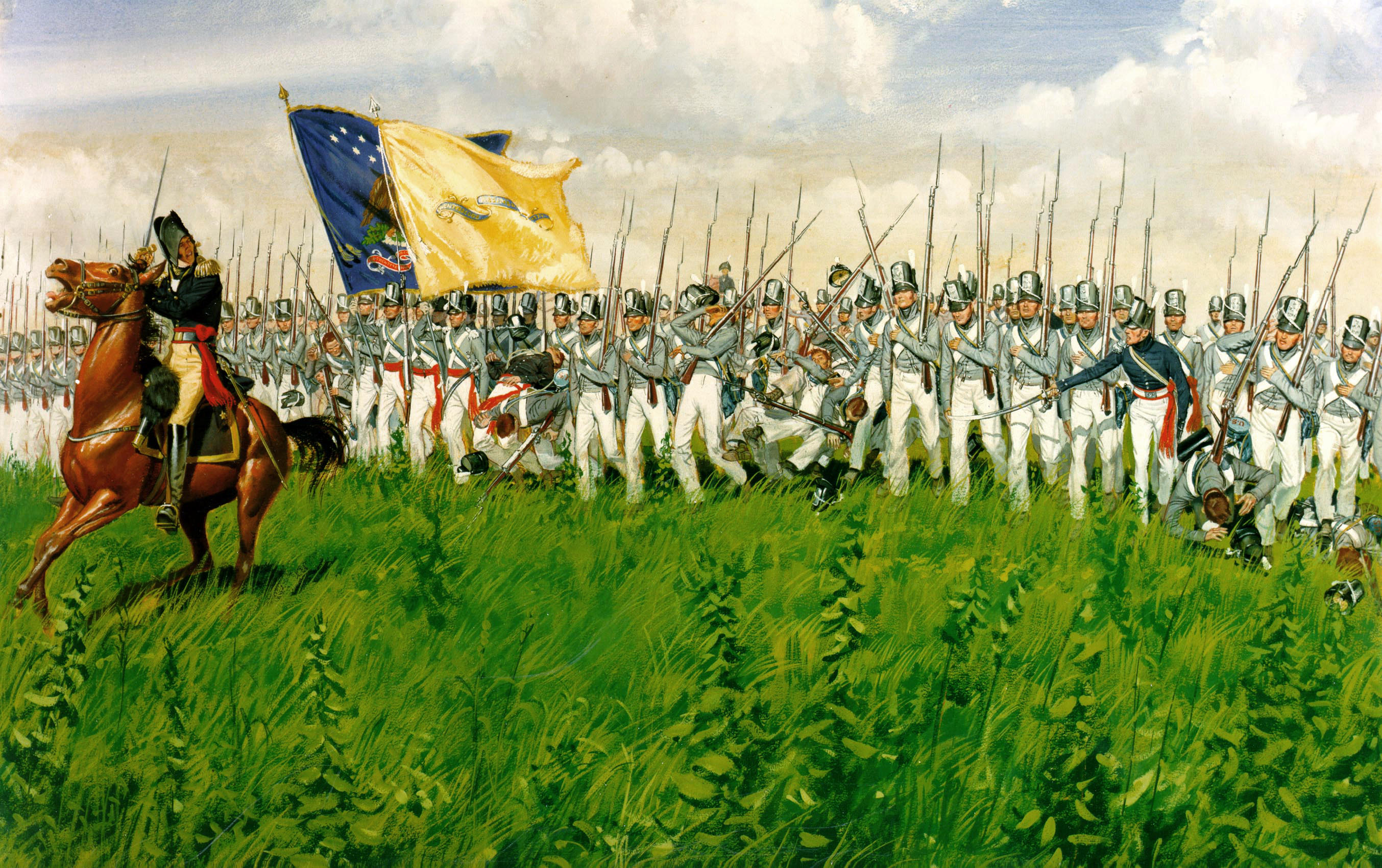
Battle of Chippawa

McBarron was born in Chicago, where he lived all his life. He was born and raised in a family home on Chicago's Near North Side, which was rebuilt by his maternal grandfather after the Great Chicago Fire of 1871.

McBarron began formal art training at age seven in classes at the Art Institute of Chicago. Upon graduation from Waller High School, now known as Lincoln Park High School, he made a sudden decision to forego admission to Northwestern University's Medill School to pursue comprehensive study at the Art Institute of Chicago. His favored artists and illustrators included Van Dyck, Winslow Homer, Howard Pyle, NC Wyeth, JC Leyendecker, Maxfield Parrish, and John Singer Sargent.

While informally researching military uniforms and weapons, McBarron realized that many illustrations of military scenes were inaccurate. He became committed to knowledgeable portrayal of detail and historical accuracy, exemplified by his 1975 work Soldiers of the American Revolution: A Sketchbook depicting the Continental Army, led by General George Washington, during the American Revolutionary War.

To support his studies, McBarron compiled an extensive personal library and collection of arms, armour, uniforms, artifacts, and research resources and archives. He drew on these and public sources for reference when creating his more than 60-year body of work. McBarron created all his illustrations from his studio in Chicago. Throughout his entire career, he maintained professional studios in Downtown Chicago, and a home-based studio in Chicago.

McBarron often drafted and completed his work in non-stop fashion. He embraced and used to his advantage then-contemporary mediums such as Black-and-White photos, Polaroid photos, and Kodak 16-mm movies. His use of photography and other such resources helped him produce illustrations and artworks that had accurate details.

To go along with his reading and research, McBarron visited and studied many of the major battlefields and historic sights located in the original Thirteen Colonies, the Western Reserve, and Canada.

He was known for his ability to comprehend and explain complexities of clothing and uniform construction. McBarron would recreate uniform patterns which he would use to sew replicas to serve as historically accurate models for his work. While attending a luncheon with a fellow historian who was writing about a particular uniform, McBarron sketched out its pattern on a cocktail napkin. The fellow historian surreptitiously pocketed McBarron's impromptu sketch, and later included its reproduction within an authoritative work on military dress.

McBarron often served as an expert consultant to the United States Marine Corps History Division, United States Army Center of Military History, the Smithsonian Institution, various military museums, and individual branches of the US Armed Forces. He also consulted with Encyclopædia Britannica and World Book Encyclopedia. McBarron served as a mentor, resource, and guide to many devotees, illustrators, and historians.

McBarron made uniform illustrations for the Military Collector & Historian, journal of the Company of Military Historians, from the work of Lieutenant Colonel Edwin North McClellan, USMC (Uniforms of the American Marines 1775 to 1829 1932, reprinted 1974, 1982):

"Captain Robert Mullan's Company of Continental Marines, 1779" (MC&H, volume I, number 1, plate #2, pp 2-3)
"U.S. Marine Corps, Circa 1805-1818" (MC&H, volume II, number 2, plate #24, pp. 25-28)

While known for his military illustrations, McBarron also created illustrations for fashion, advertising and mail order catalogues. He produced such popular-culture icons as Captain Midnight, the Jolly Green Giant and Buster Brown. He portrayed himself as a subject within his works, and can be found in virtually all his military depictions. Where's Waldo? illustrator Martin Handford, in a Time Magazine article, cited McBarron as his primary influence.

== Marriage and family ==
McBarron married Mary Cecilia Pugh with whom he had a son and a daughter.

After his death, McBarron was interred next to his wife at Calvary Cemetery in Evanston, Illinois.

== Professional work ==
Among H. Charles McBarron's noted series of artworks on American Military subjects are:

- Over 250 color illustrations for Military Uniforms in America, the quarterly publication of the Company of Military Historians (H. Charles McBarron-Founding Member & Fellow); c. 1948-1990
- Five series of Ten each: 50 Illustrations entitled The American Soldier: 1775 to the Present; reproductions published by the US Government Printing Office, Washington DC
- Sixteen paintings of The Army in Action; c. 1950-cc; reproductions published by the US Government Printing Office, Washington DC
- Two series of 12 each = Twenty-four paintings of historic Uniforms of the US Navy 1775-1968 for the US Navy Department; published by the US Government Printing Office, Washington, DC
- Ten paintings: Soldiers of the American Revolution for the Center of Military History; reproductions published by the U.S. Government Printing Office
- Twenty-seven paintings for the American Oil Company (Amoco) c. 1963-65, Historical Americana

=== Illustrated publications ===
- Book of the Continental Soldier, Harold Peterson, illustrated by H. Charles McBarron, c 1965
- Soldiers of the American Revolution: A Sketchbook; H. Charles McBarron, Department of the Army, Center of Military History, Washington, D.C., 1976
- Military Uniforms in America; John R. Elting and Michael J. McAfee (editors), illustrated by H Charles McBarron. published by Presidio Press, California (four volumes):

- Volume I The Era of the American Revolution, 1755-1795, Presidio Press, San Rafael, California, 1974
- Volume II Years of Growth, 1796-1851, Presidio Press, San Rafael, California, 1977
- Volume III Long Endure, The Civil War Period, 1852-67, Presidio Press, Novato, California, 1982
- Volume IV The Modern Era, from 1868, Presidio Press, Novato, California, 1988

- Encyclopædia Britannica; Illustrations of Military and Historical subjects
- Book of Costume; Simon & Schuster
- Book of Soldiers; Simon & Schuster
- Historical Slide Films; Society for Visual Education
- Numerous illustrations for textbooks, mostly historical
- Numerous illustrations for magazines and calendars

== Professional membership ==
- Company of Military Historians. Founding Member c. 1948 (along with Anne K. Brown- "Anatomy of Glory", Brown University Press c 1961) McBarron illustrated up to 300 illustrations for publication in its Military Uniforms in America series. He created the Company's "Continental Rifleman 1775" illustrated emblem.
- Smithsonian Institution; Consultant

== Collections and works ==
- Cantigny Park; Wheaton, Illinois -Col. Robert R. McCormick Memorial Museum to the 1st Division, 8 paintings
- Cowpens National Battlefield; Chesnee, South Carolina; "Battle of Cowpens" c. 1980
- Smithsonian Institution; Washington DC -42 colour illustrations of the US Army, US Navy & US Marine Corps through United States history
- United States Department of Defense; Washington DC and US Military Bases and Installations
- West Point Museum, United States Military Academy; West Point, New York
- US Marine Corps Museum; Philadelphia, Pennsylvania -Large Oil Painting
- US Army War College; Norfolk, Virginia -Large Oil Painting(5x8)
- Valley Forge Military Academy; Valley Forge, Pennsylvania -Portrait of General Lee on Horseback
- Virginia Military Institute; Lexington, Virginia
- The Citadel; Charleston, South Carolina
- Pritzker Military Museum & Library; Chicago, Illinois -"The Doughboy"
- Parks Canada - Battle of the Châteauguay National Historic Site of Canada, life-sized mural (30x8), Battle of the Chateauguay c. 1977
