= Anne S. K. Brown Military Collection =

Coordinates: 41.858007°N 71.449563°W

The Anne S. K. Brown Military Collection is one of the largest research collections devoted to the history and iconography of soldiers and soldiering, from circa 1500 to 1945. Formerly a private collection, it was donated to the Brown University Library in 1981.

Anne S. K. Brown began collecting toy soldiers in 1930, but within a few years had moved on to acquiring graphics and monographs depicting or describing military uniforms. In the years following the Second World War, the collection increased dramatically, so much so that the Brown family were advised to move the archive out of their house for fear of causing structural damage from the weight. Today, the collection is located on the top floor of the John Hay Library situated on the Brown University campus.
