= Harold L. Peterson =

American historian

- Born: May 22, 1922; Peekskill, New York
- Died: January 1, 1978 (aged 55); Alexandria, Virginia
- Occupation: Historian for National Park Service.
- Known for: Expert on historical arms, armor and related.

Harold Leslie Peterson (1922–1978) was a historian widely considered in his day to be a foremost expert on firearms and related subjects in American history.

Peterson was born in Peekskill, New York, on May 22, 1922. He attended Drew University in Madison, New Jersey, where he was an undefeated varsity fencer in foil and saber. His education was interrupted by a nine-month tour of active duty during World War II. He graduated from Drew with an AB magna cum laude in 1945. He then went to work at the Wisconsin Historical Society while simultaneously pursuing an MA in history at the University of Wisconsin, which he received in 1947.

In 1949, Peterson co-founded a group which eventually formalized into the Company of Military Historians. He served on the Board of Governors for the organization from 1949 to 1972 and as President from 1960 to 1963. He was also elected a Fellow of the organization in 1957.

Peterson's entire professional career was with the National Park Service. From 1963 until his death in 1978 he held the title of Curator. During his career he was consultant to many organizations and museums as an expert on historical arms and armor. In addition to his particular focus on arms, he was also a general promoter of the history mission of the Park Service, and was a leader of the Eastern National Park and Monument Association.

Peterson's interest, writings and research in military history went well beyond the range of arms and armor, to include military music and drinks of soldiers. He recorded his own performances of classic military music, and he wrote a book on drinks called Cups of Valor under the pseudonym N. E. Beveridge.

When Peterson died on January 1, 1978, he was survived by his wife, Dorothy Parker Peterson, a son Harold L. Jr., a daughter, Kristin Smalley, and his parents, Dr. and Mrs. Leslie C. Peterson.

== Bibliography ==
Books by Peterson:

- Peterson, Harold L. (2003) [First published 1954]. The American Sword, 1775-1945. Mineola, NY: Dover Publications. ISBN 0486428028. OCLC 51653498.
- Peterson, Harold L. (2000) [First published 1956]. Arms and Armor in Colonial America. Mineola, NY: Dover Publications, Inc. ISBN 0-486-41244-X. OCLC 44447011.
- Peterson, Harold L. (1957). Arms and Armor of the Pilgrims. Plymouth, MA: Plimoth Plantation, Inc. and the Pilgrim Society. OCLC 13605080. Free version at Project Gutenberg.
- Peterson, Harold L. (1958). American Knives. New York: Scribner. OCLC 1172161.
- Peterson, Harold L. (1959). Notes on Ordnance of the American Civil War, 1861-1865. Washington: American Ordnance Association. OCLC 1747771.
- Peterson, Harold L.; Feaser, Dan (1961). A History of Firearms. New York: Scribner. ISBN 0684923084.
- Peterson, Harold L. (1962). The Treasury of the Gun. New York: Golden Press. OCLC 965037.
- Peterson, Harold L. (1964). The Encyclopedia of Firearms. Dutton. OCLC 857231.
- Peterson, Harold L.; Feaser, Daniel D. (1964). Forts in America. New York: Scribner. ISBN 068412890X.
- Peterson, Harold L. (1965). American Indian Tomahawks. New York: Museum of the American Indian, Heye Foundation. OCLC 2153645.
- Peterson, Harold L.; Feaser, Daniel D. (1966). A History of Knives. New York: Scribner. OCLC 566972.
- Peterson, Harold L. (1967). Pageant of the Gun. Garden City, NY: Doubleday. OCLC 1441868.
- Peterson, Harold L. (1967). The Fuller Collection of American Firearms. Philadelphia: Eastern National Park and Monument Association. OCLC 731256.
- Peterson, Harold L. (1968). The Book of the Continental Soldier; Being a Compleat Account of the Uniforms, Weapons, and Equipment With Which He Lived and Fought. Harrisburg, PA: Stackpole Co. OCLC 189383.
- Peterson, Harold L. (1968). Daggers and Fighting Knives of the Western World. New York: Walker. OCLC 50890.
- Peterson, Harold L.; Feaser, Daniel D. (1968). A History of Body Armor. New York: Scribner. OCLC 449351.
- Peterson, Harold L. (as N. E. Beveridge) (1968). Cups of Valor. Harrisburg, PA: Stackpole Books. OCLC 449432.
- Peterson, Harold L. (1969). Round Shot and Rammers, an Introduction to Muzzle-Loading Land Artillery in the United States. Harrisburg, PA: Stackpole Books. ISBN 0811715019. OCLC 5520.
- Peterson, Harold L. (1971). Americans at Home: From the Colonists to the Late Victorians. New York: Scribner. ISBN 0684123444.
- Peterson, Harold L.; Elman, Robert; O'Rourke, J. Barry (1971). The Great Guns. New York: Grosset & Dunlap. ISBN 0448020696.
