= Berkley (Washington, D.C.) =

- Neighborhood of Washington, D.C.
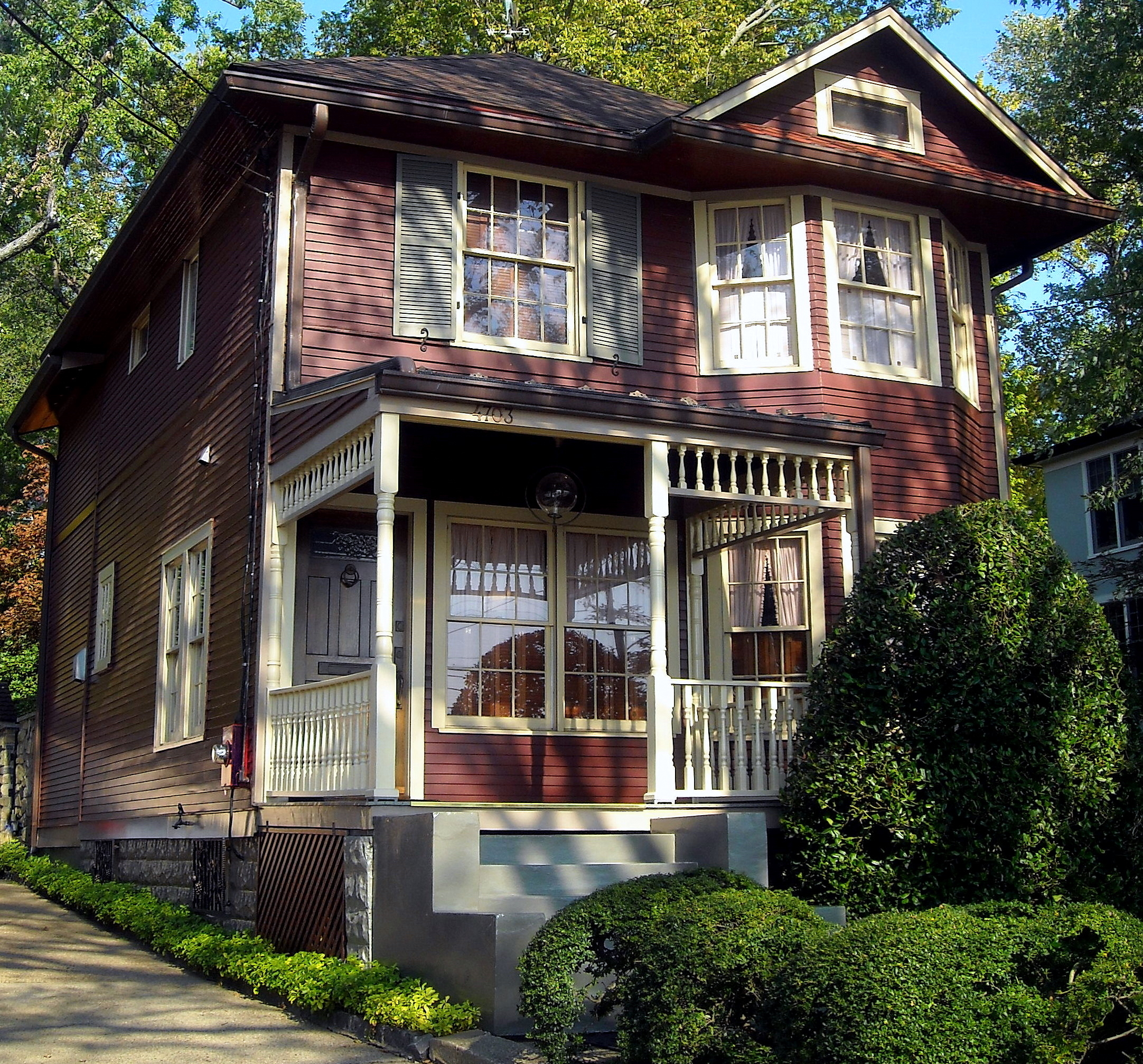
- An American Craftsman-style home in Berkley (2008)

- Map of Washington, D.C., with Berkley highlighted in red
- Coordinates: 38.912056°N 77.08825°W
- Country: United States
- District: Washington, D.C.
- Ward: Ward 3

Government
  - Councilmember: Matthew Frumin
- Postal code: ZIP code

Berkley is a neighborhood in the Northwest quadrant of Washington, D.C.

== Geography ==
Berkley is bounded by Wesley Heights Park to the north, MacArthur Boulevard to the southwest, Battery Kemble Park to the west, and 44th Street and Foxhall Road to the east. Beyond the line formed by 44th and Foxhall lies Glover-Archbold Park, meaning that Berkley is surrounded on three sides by parkland. Its fourth side is adjacent to two neighborhoods, Foxhall and The Palisades, and as such is sometimes confused for them.

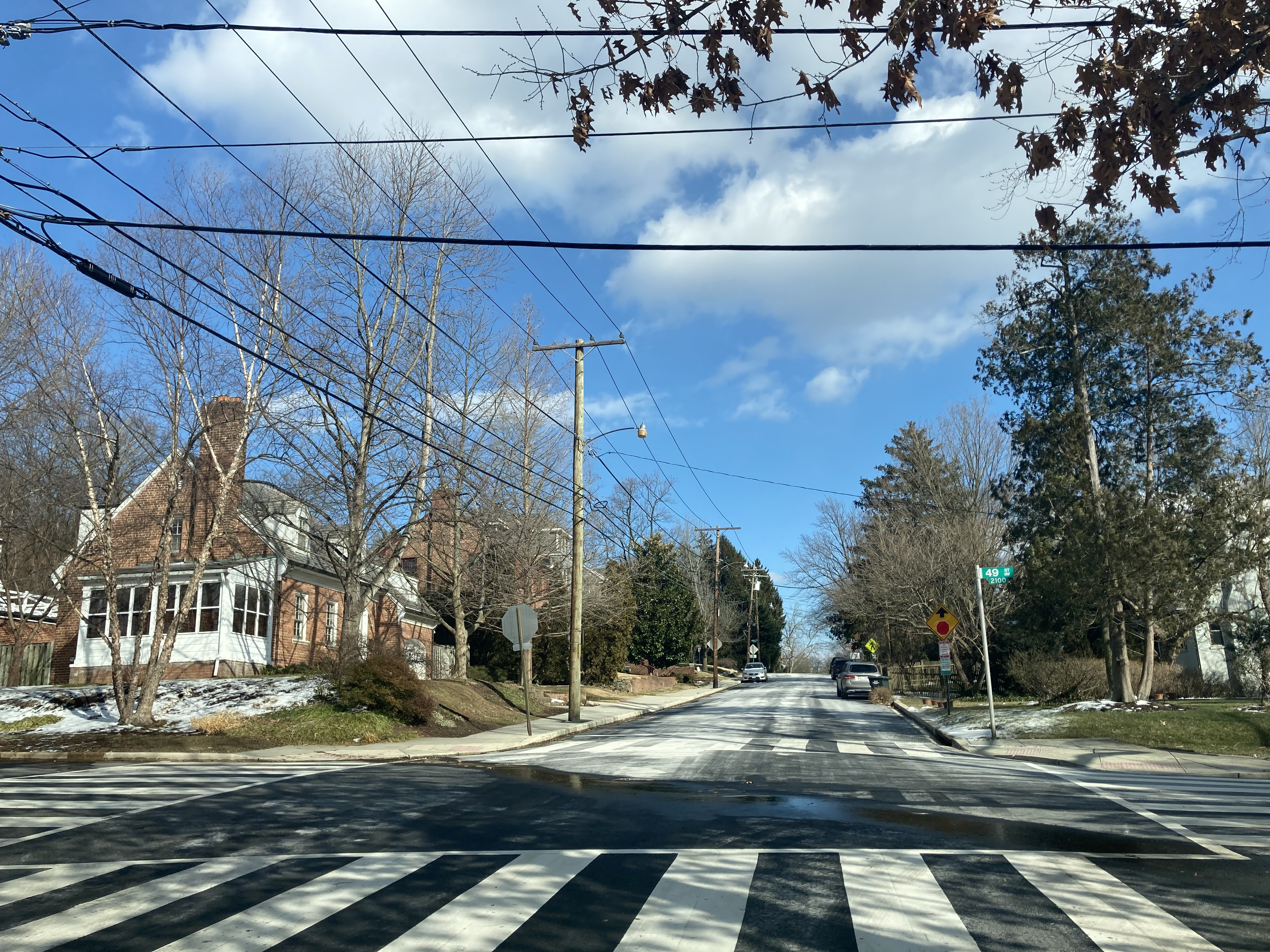
Intersection of W St. and 49th St. NW in February 2021

== Landmarks ==
Berkley is a suburban-style neighborhood, naturally isolated from the more cosmopolitan parts of the city by its location between parks. It is home to the Embassy of Germany and George Washington University's Mount Vernon Campus.

It was also very nearly the site of an official residence of the mayor of Washington, D.C., in 2001 when Betty Brown Casey, widow of millionaire Maryland real estate developer Eugene B. Casey, donated 17 acres (69,000 m^{2}) of land at 1801 Foxhall Road to the city for the purpose of a mayoral mansion. However, the city was bogged down for nearly a year in attempting to purchase adjacent land from the National Park Service; additionally, many vocal city activists and residents felt that for a city marked by increasing gentrification and socioeconomic diversity, building a mayoral residence in such a wealthy enclave sent a bad message.
