= J. Carter Brown =

American art director

John Carter Brown III

Director of the National Gallery of Art
- In office 1969–1992
- Preceded by: John Walker
- Succeeded by: Earl Alexander Powell III

Personal details
- Born: October 8, 1934 Providence, Rhode Island, US
- Died: June 17, 2002 (aged 67) Boston, Massachusetts, US
- Spouses: Constance Mellon Byers (m. 1971; div. 1973) Pamela Braga Drexel (m. 1976; div. 1991)
- Children: 2
- Parent(s): John Nicholas Brown II; Anne Seddon Kinsolving Brown
- Education: Groton School
- Alma mater: Harvard University; Harvard Business School; New York University
- Occupation: Arts administrator
- Awards: National Medal of Arts, Honor Award

John Carter Brown III (October 8, 1934 – June 17, 2002) was the director of the U.S. National Gallery of Art from 1969 to 1992 and a leading figure in American intellectual life. Under Brown's direction, the National Gallery became one of the leading art museums in the United States, if not the world. He was known as a champion of the arts and public access to art at a time of decreased public spending on the humanities.

== Early life ==
Brown was born in Providence, Rhode Island, on October 8, 1934, to John Nicholas Brown II and Anne Seddon Kinsolving Brown. His family had been prominent since before the American Revolution. His ancestors donated the initial endowment for Brown University and served as professors, administrators, and benefactors of the school in its early years. His father, John Nicholas Brown II, served as Assistant Secretary of the Navy (AIR) under President Harry S. Truman. Brown's parents, both involved in numerous cultural organizations, encouraged their son's interest in art. Brown was raised in his family's historic home, the Nightingale-Brown House.

As a boy, he attended the Arizona Desert School near Tucson, Arizona, before completing his secondary education at the Groton School in Massachusetts, where he graduated at the top of his class. He spent one year at the Stowe School in England before enrolling at Harvard University. He graduated summa cum laude with a major in History and Literature and was president of the Harvard Glee Club. Seeking a unique entry point into the world of art and culture, Brown decided to pursue a business degree long before "arts management" existed as a common course of study. After completing his M.B.A. at Harvard Business School, he spent a year studying with Harvard-trained art historian Bernard Berenson in Florence, Italy. He then enrolled at New York University's Institute of Fine Arts. After completing his master's degree, he decided not to complete a Ph.D. in art history.

== National Gallery ==
In 1961, Brown was hired by the National Gallery of Art as an assistant to the Director, John Walker. He was soon groomed to be Walker's successor and appointed assistant director in 1964. In this capacity he supervised the construction of the museum's East Building, designed by American architect I. M. Pei. In 1969, at the age of 34, Brown became director of the National Gallery. He would become the longest serving director in the National Gallery's history.

One of Brown's ambitions as director was to attract larger crowds to the nation's art museum. He was known for bringing "blockbuster" exhibitions to the museum. The National Gallery became a rival of the Metropolitan Museum of Art in New York for exhibitions and donations. During his 23 years as director of the National Gallery, he added over 20,000 works to the collection. As many museums and cultural institutions lost public funding, Brown worked with Congress to increase the Gallery's operating budget year after year. He inherited a budget of $3 million in 1969 and increased that to $52 million when he retired in 1992. During the same period, the Gallery's endowment grew from $34 million to $186 million.

Through his high-profile leadership of the National Gallery, Brown became one of the leading public intellectuals in American and the champion of American art. His contacts in Washington politics and New York society aided him in his work at the museum. He also served as a trustee of the Kennedy Center for Performing Arts, a member of the Committee for the Preservation of the White House, and the chairman of the U.S. Commission of Fine Arts, a review panel that oversees public art and architecture in the nation's capital. In this latter position, he approved the Vietnam Veterans Memorial and an addition to the Corcoran Gallery of Art designed by Frank Gehry, which was never built. He was a vociferous opponent of and voted against the installation of the Vietnam Women's Memorial. He opposed the plan to amend Washington's Height Act to allow for taller buildings, saying President Washington's "vision is unpolluted as yet by the pressures of economic greed." He also supported the erection of the National World War II Memorial on the National Mall, though he described U. S. Marine Corps's Iwo Jima Memorial as "kitsch," comparing the monument to "a great piece of Ivory Soap carved."

In 1991, he was awarded the National Medal of Arts. Brown retired in 1992, after the National Gallery's 50th anniversary.

=== Retirement ===
After leaving the National Gallery in 1992, Brown became chairman of Ovation, a cable television arts network that furthered his ambition to "bring the arts into people's living rooms." He remained involved in many cultural organizations, including the Commission of Fine Arts, American Federation of Arts, the National Academy of Design, the Storm King Art Center, and the World Monuments Fund. He continued to serve also as a trustee of the John Carter Brown Library at Brown University and as chairman of the jury for the Pritzker Prize, the leading award for architecture. He became a member of the American Philosophical Society and the American Academy of Arts and Sciences in 1992 and 1993, respectively. In 1993 he was presented with the Honor Award by the National Building Museum at a ceremony in Washington, D.C. In 2001, he received the Golden Plate Award of the American Academy of Achievement presented by Awards Council member and operatic soprano Kathleen Battle.

== Personal life ==
In 1971, Brown married Constance Barber (née Mellon) Byers (1941–1983), a daughter of Richard King Mellon, granddaughter of Richard B. Mellon, and the former wife of William Russell Grace Byers. She was also a niece of Paul Mellon, chairman of the National Gallery's board of trustees and a major donor. They divorced in 1973.

In 1976, he married Pamela Braga Drexel (1947–2005) in Westminster Abbey, London. She was the daughter of B. Rionda Braga, a Cuban who was involved in the sugar business, and was the former wife of John R. Drexel IV (b. 1945). Before their divorce in 1991, they were the parents of two children:

- John Carter Brown IV (born 1977)
- Elissa Lucinda Rionda Brown (born 1983).

In August 2000, Carter was diagnosed with multiple myeloma, a terminal blood cancer, which was treated with an autologous stem cell transplant. Brown resumed his normal life until May 2002, when he was rehospitalized. He died six weeks later.

Near the end of his life, he became engaged to marry Anne Hawley of Brookline, Massachusetts, Director of the Isabella Stewart Gardner Museum. He had also begun writing a book about his life and his father's life.
