= College Hill, Providence, Rhode Island =

College Hill
- Neighborhood of Providence
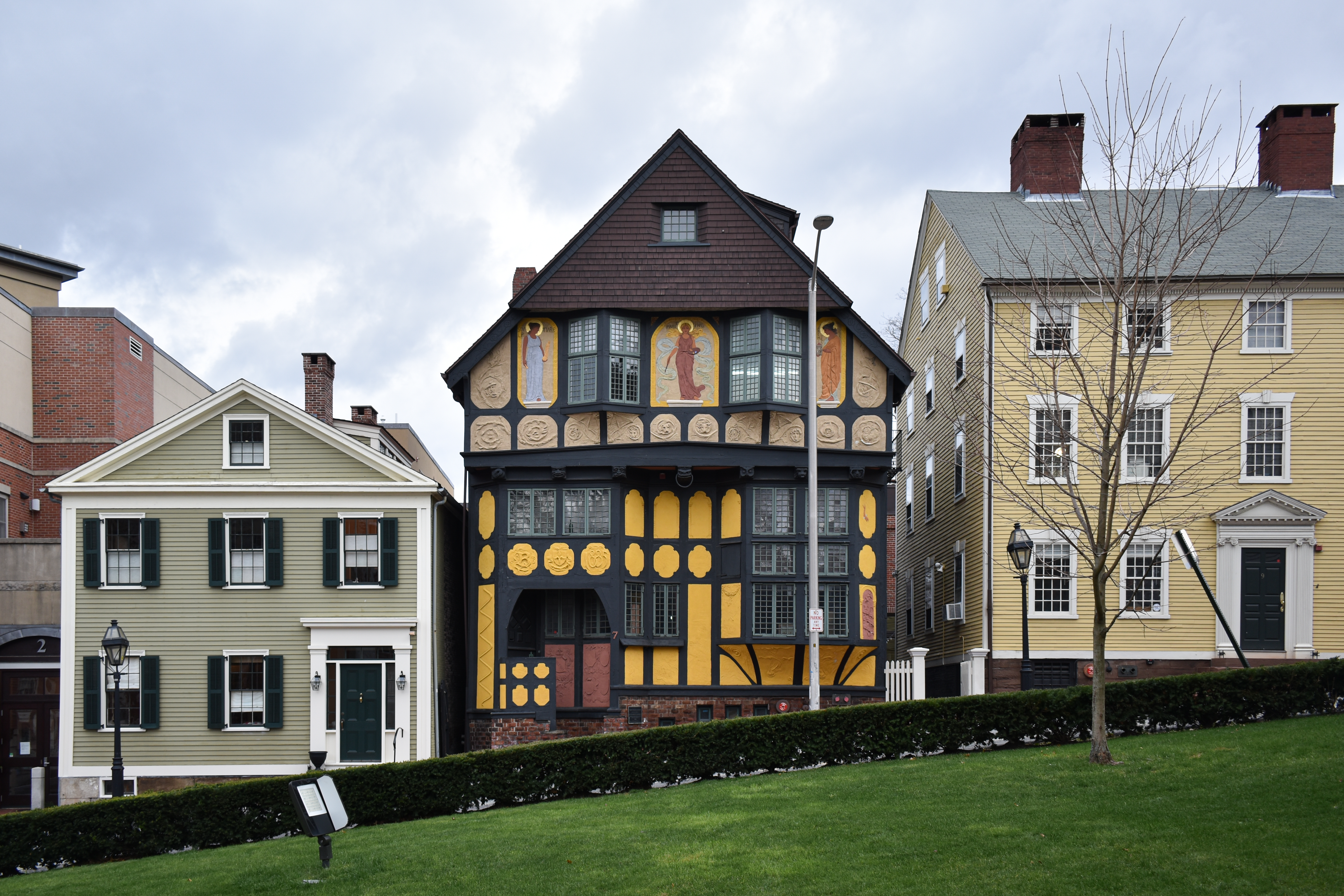
- The Fleur-de-lys Studios (1885) and Deacon Taylor House (1785)

- Location of College Hill within Providence
- Coordinates: 41°49′45″N 71°24′03″W
- Country: United States
- State: Rhode Island
- City: Providence

Area
  - Total: 0.770 sq mi (1.99 km^{2})

Population
  - Total: 9,124

College Hill is a historic neighborhood of Providence, Rhode Island, and one of six neighborhoods comprising the city's East Side. It is roughly bounded by South and North Main Street to the west, Power Street to the south, Governor Street and Arlington Avenue to the east and Olney Street to the north. The neighborhood's primary commercial area extends along Thayer Street, a strip frequented by students in the Providence area.

College Hill is the most affluent neighborhood in Providence, with a median family income of nearly three times that of the whole city.

Portions of College Hill are designated local and national historic districts for their historical residential architecture. In 2011, the American Planning Association designated the neighborhood one of the "Great Places in America".

== Name ==
The toponym "College Hill" has been in use since at least 1788. The name refers to the neighborhood's topography and numerous higher educational institutions: Brown University, Rhode Island School of Design, Pembroke College, and the since–relocated Bryant University.

Prior to Brown University's 1770 relocation to Providence, the area was known as Prospect Hill.

== History ==
The indigenous Wampanoag and Narraganset people inhabited the region prior to the arrival of English settlers.

=== Settlement ===
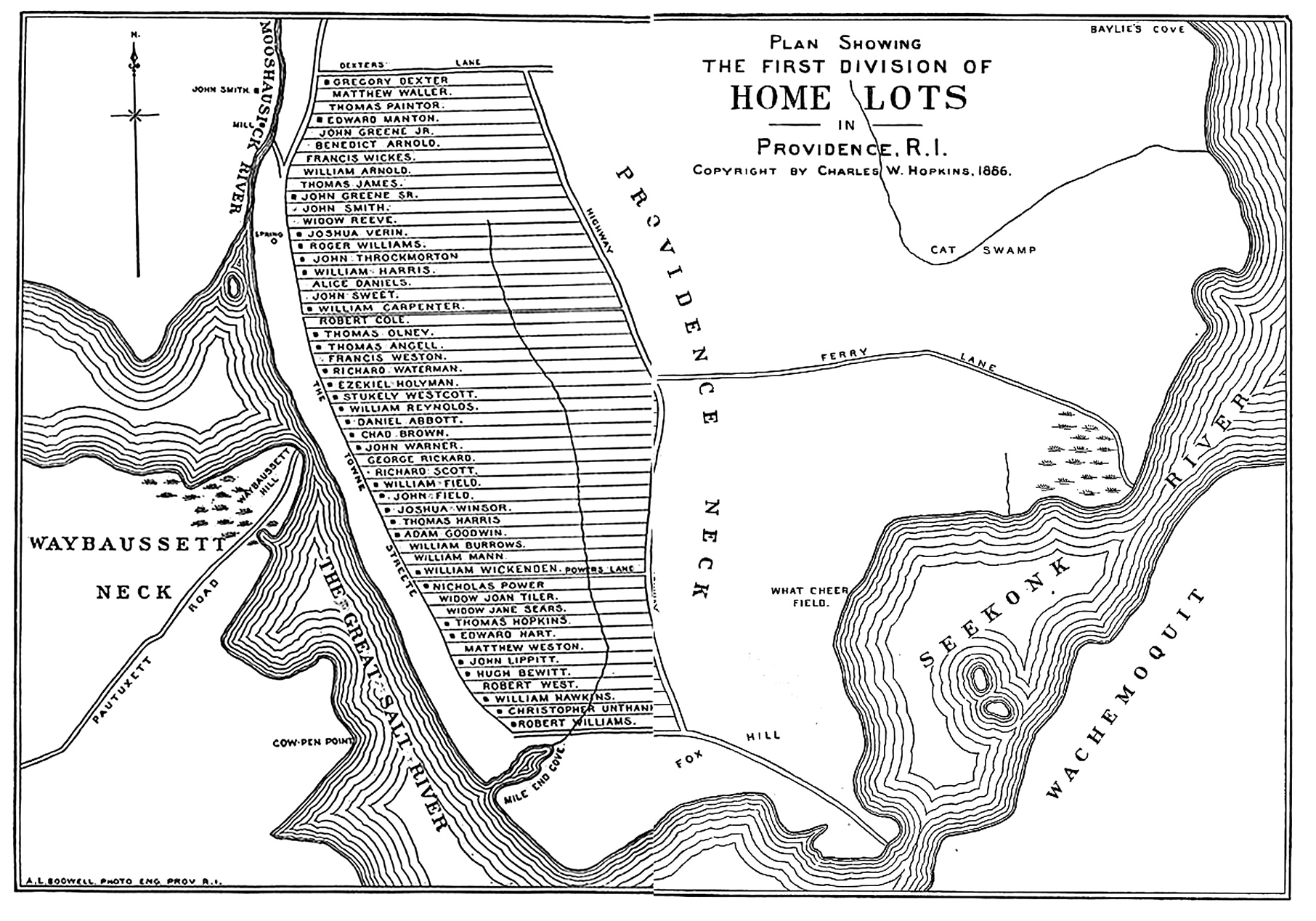
Early town layout of Providence. The plots are concentrated in the area now known as College Hill.

In 1635, religious dissenter Roger Williams established the settlement of Providence Plantations near the confluence of the Moshassuck and Woonasquatucket Rivers. By 1644, this settlement had taken root around a natural spring at the base of what is now College Hill. In 1638, the settlers allotted home lots. Roughly six acres each, these narrow tracts extended from Towne Street (now Main Street) to Hope Street, falling largely within the bounds of modern College Hill. Back Street—originally a series of paths running parallel to Towne and Hope—developed into what is now Benefit Street.

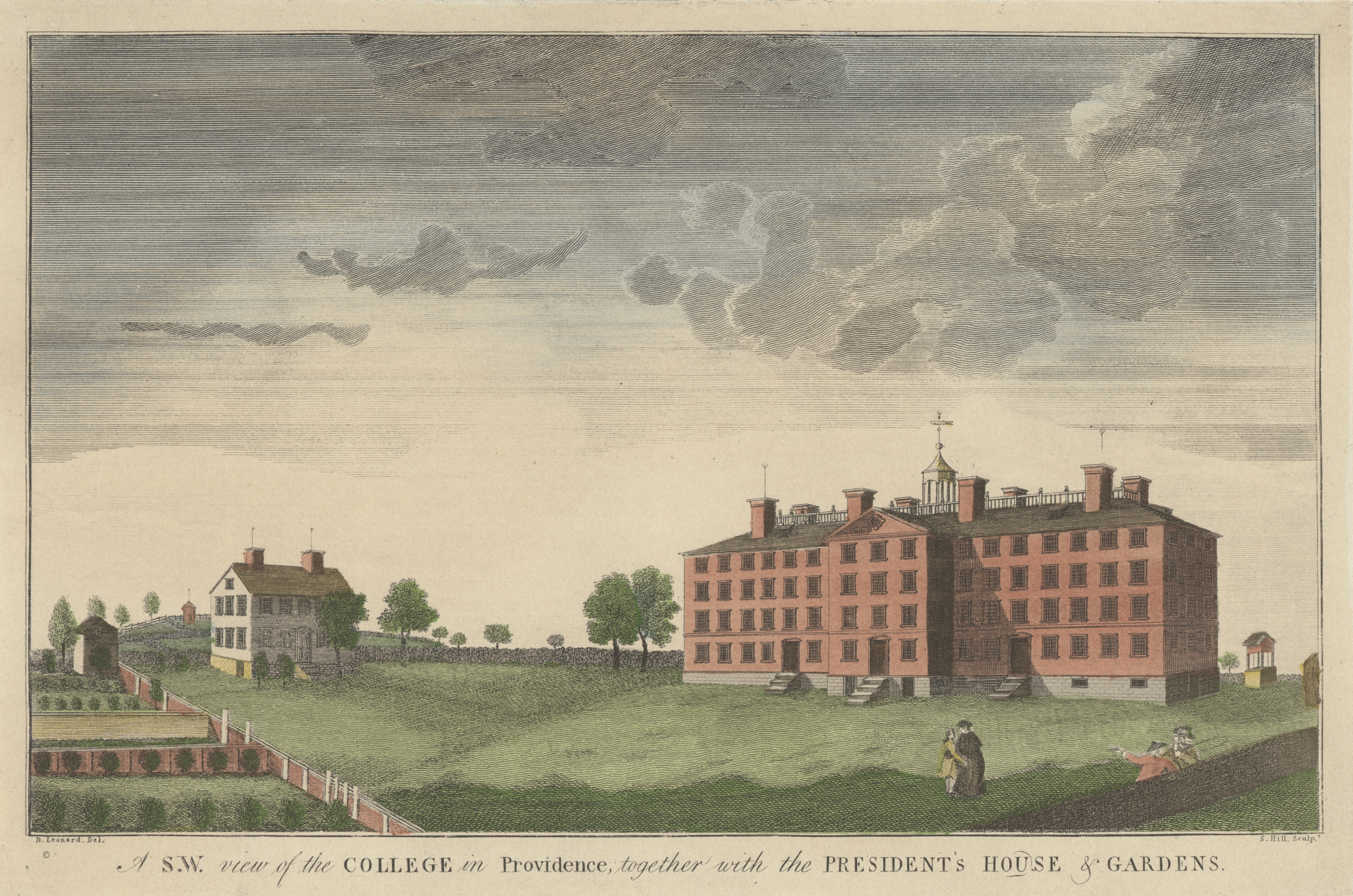
This 1795 engraving is the first known image of University Hall, built 1770-71, one of seven surviving American college buildings that date from the colonial period.

In 1770, the college that became Brown University moved to College Hill, establishing its campus on land purchased by Moses Brown and John Brown.

By the time of the American Revolution, the foot of the hill was densely populated with wharves, warehouses, shops, public buildings, and residential houses. Benefit Street was home to several hotels, including the Golden Ball Inn which hosted noted guests such as George Washington, Thomas Jefferson, and Marquis de Lafayette.

=== 19th century ===
In the nineteenth century, precious metals and jewelry trading drove much business on North Main Street.

In 1893, the Rhode Island School of Design (RISD) moved from a space leased in Downtown Providence to its current home at the base of College Hill. Over a century later, the school would expand by relocating its main library, undergrad dormitories, and graduate studios into Downtown buildings.

=== 20th century ===
In 1935, Bryant College of Business Administration moved from Downtown Providence to College Hill.

Beginning in 1922, Brown University began expanding its property holdings as an attempt to increase on-campus housing for its growing student body. These efforts culminated in the 1949-1957 construction of Keeney and Wriston Quadrangles, which involved the demolition of 59 historic homes.

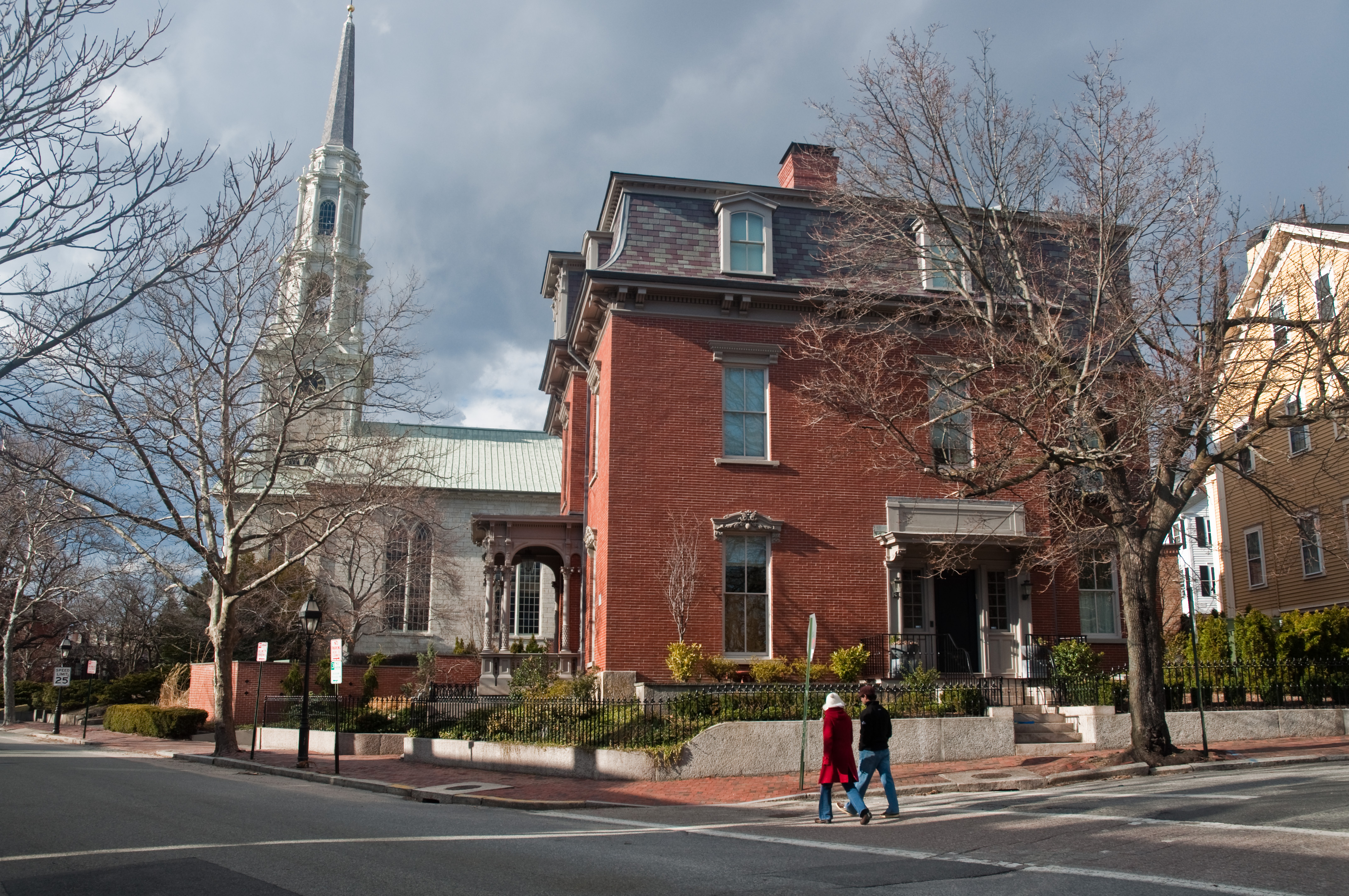
The Susan and William Huston House (1867) and First Unitarian Church (1816) on Benefit Street

Through the middle of the 20th century, the area nearer to the waterfront and Statehouse became a working-class neighborhood. Subdivided houses inhabited by these low-income communities became targets for demolition under one of the city's proposed urban renewal projects, spurred by slum clearance funds guaranteed by the Housing Act of 1949.

Brown's expansion coupled with urban renewal proposals catalyzed the establishment of local preservationist organizations which sought to maintain the dominance of historic structures in the neighborhood. In the mid-1950s, the newly-founded Providence Preservation Society (PPS) and the City of Providence together solicited $50,000 in research and renewal funds from the United States Department of Housing and Urban Development. This grant financed the development of a study and plan entitled College Hill: A Demonstration Study of Historic Area Renewal. Published in 1959, the report recommended the use of both public and private investment to restore and re-historicize North Benefit street with the goal of raising property values. The subsequent preservation efforts spearheaded by the PPS rehabilitated existing buildings, demolished decrepit structures, and relocated historic houses from other portions of Providence to the area.

This process, while lauded as a victory for historic preservation, directly resulted in the gentrification of the area, displacing the neighborhood's working-class African-American and Cape Verdean communities. These efforts also resulted in the conversion of the formerly mixed-use area surrounding Benefit Street to an almost purely residential neighborhood.

== Architecture ==
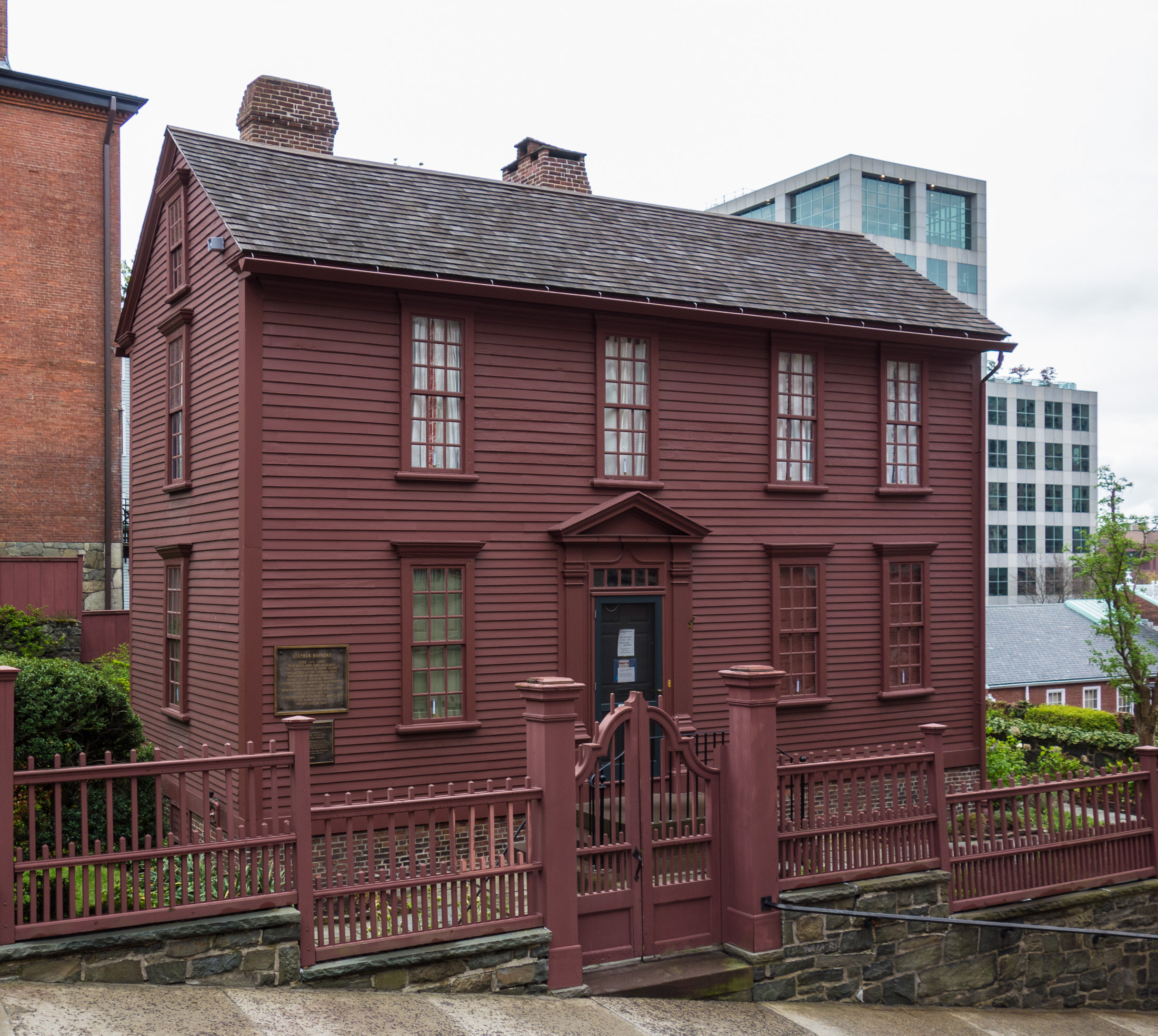
Governor Stephen Hopkins House, built 1707 is the oldest extant house in Providence.

College Hill boasts architectural styles from the 18th century onward, including residences and institutional structures.

As Providence's colonial core, the neighborhood contains a number of the city's oldest structures. Among these are the Governor Stephen Hopkins House (1707), the Benjamin Cushing Sr House (c. 1737), the Jabez Bowen House (1739), and the John Corliss House (1746).

College Hill is particularly noted for its 18th and 19th century mansions, many of which are situated on or near Benefit Street. Among these residences are the John Brown House (1786), Nightingale-Brown House (1792), Edward Dexter House (1795) and Thomas P. Ives House (1803), Corliss-Carrington House (1812), Thomas F. Hoppin House (1853), and Governor Henry Lippitt House (1865).

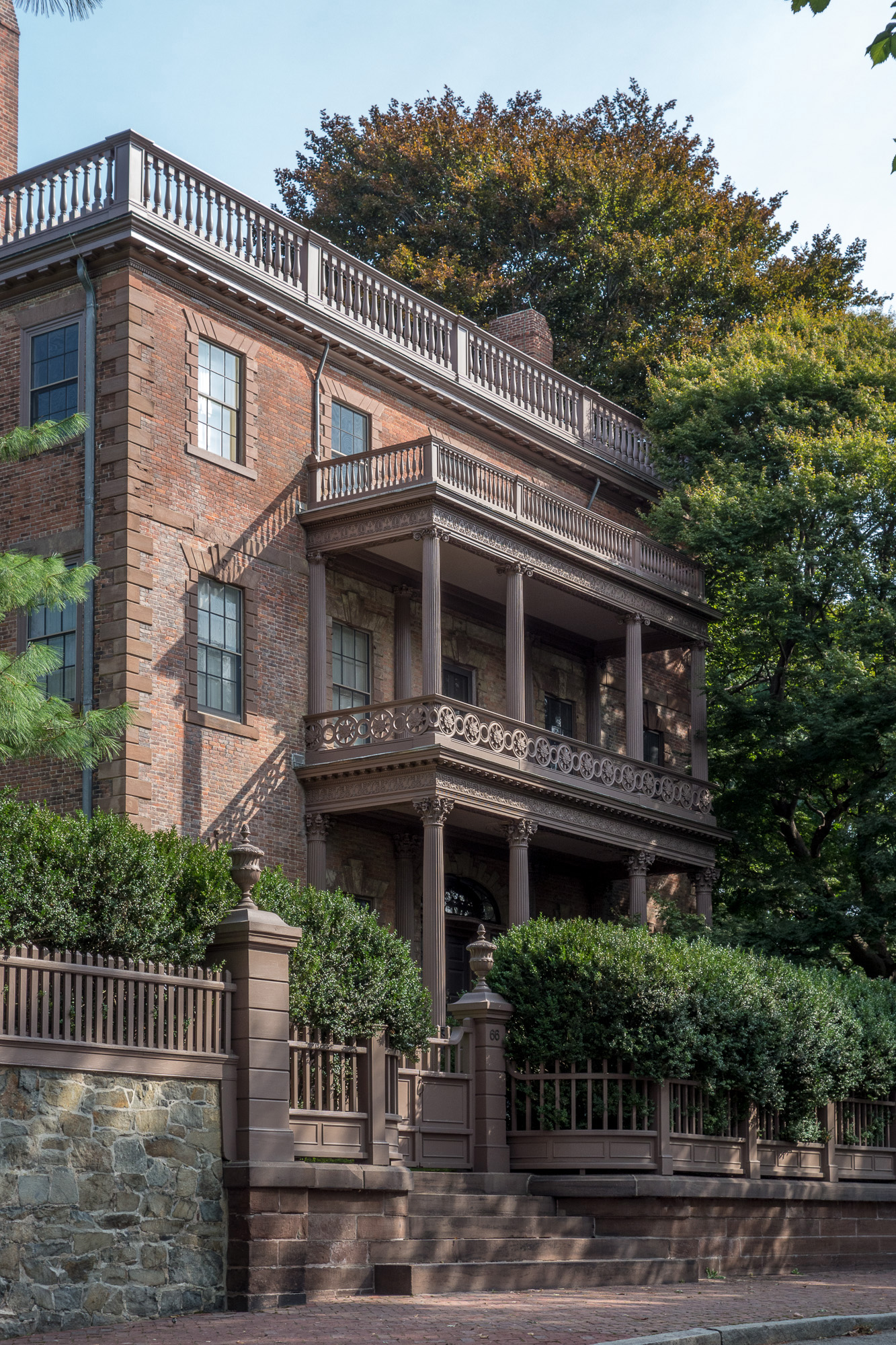
Corliss-Carrington House (1812)

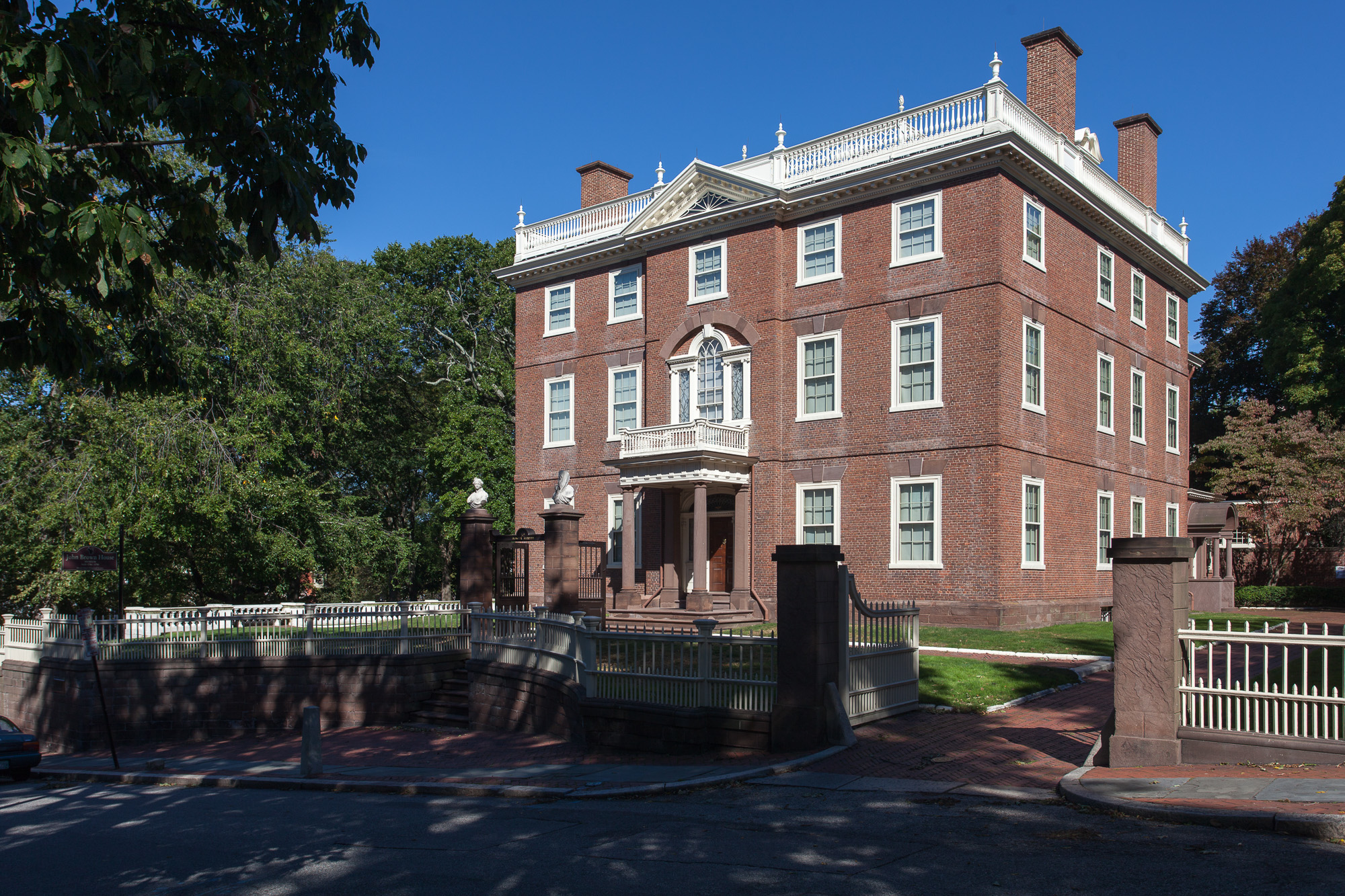
John Brown House (1786)

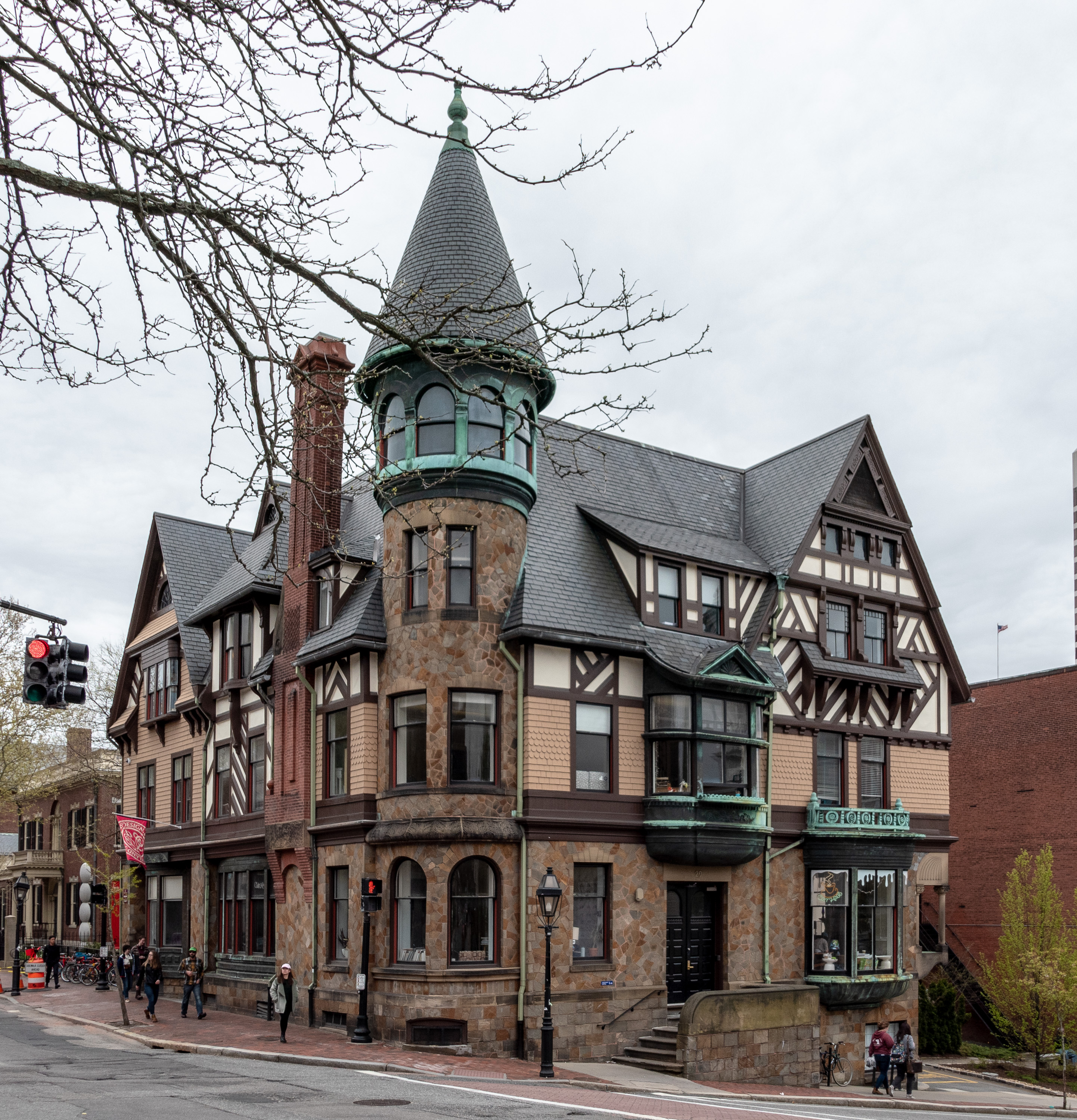
Dr. George W. Carr House (1885)

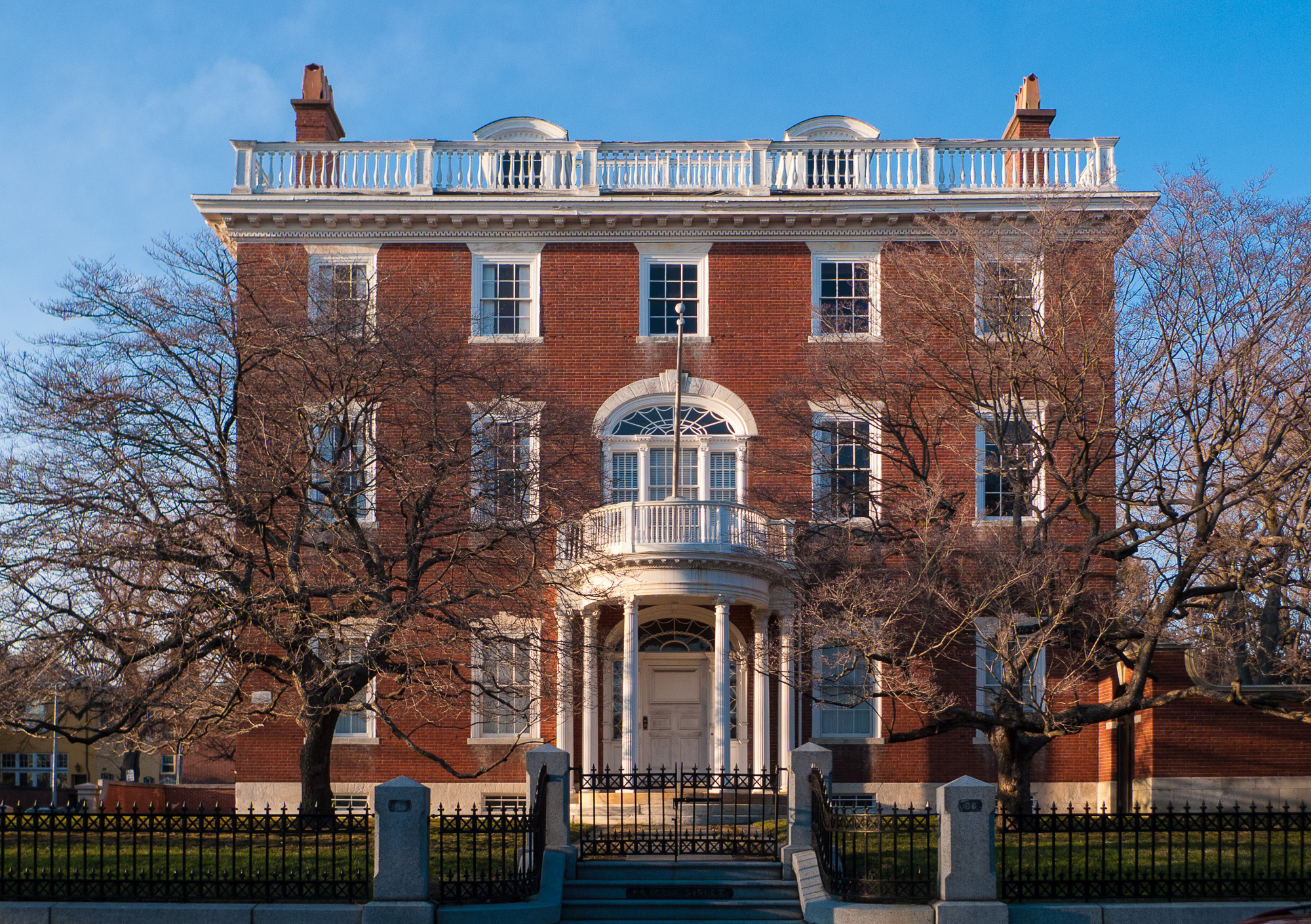
The Thomas P. Ives House (1803)

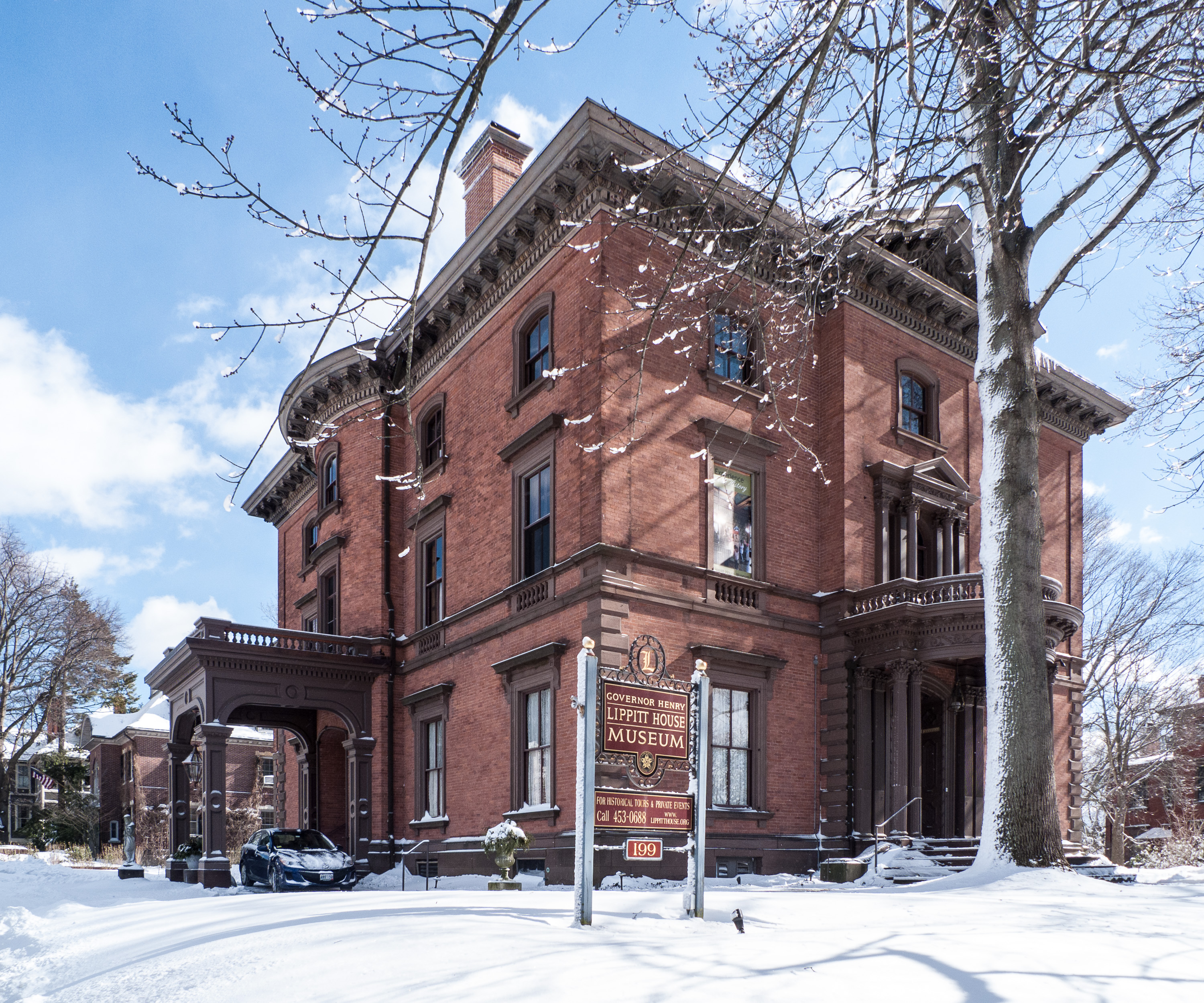
Governor Henry Lippitt House (1862)

Other structures of note include the Fleur-de-lys Studios, Providence Athenaeum, Old State House, and Brick Schoolhouse.

Nearly all of the buildings situated near historic Benefit Street have been rehabilitated in some form. Preservation guidelines ensure that period specific new construction can be woven into the existing collection of buildings. As the area is home to one of the finest cohesive collections of restored 18th- and 19th-century architecture in the United States, the College Hill neighborhood experiences significant infrastructure and building reinvestment dollars compared to other regions throughout the state.

== Government ==
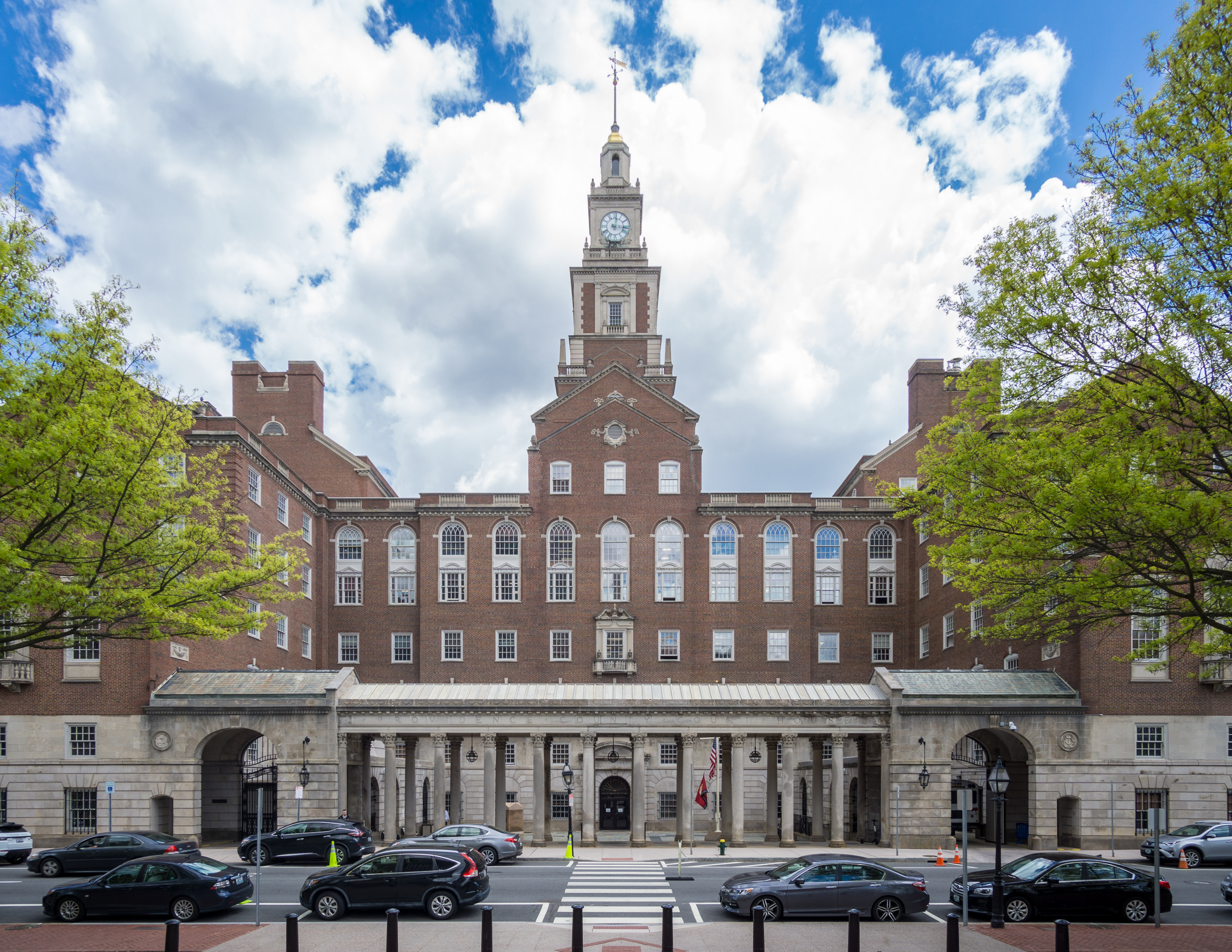
Providence County courthouse

College Hill is divided along Angell Street between Ward One to the south and Ward Two to the north. As of 2021, Ward One is represented in the Providence City Council by John Goncalves and Ward Two by Helen Anthony. Both are Democrats.

The most prominent public building in College Hill is the Providence County Courthouse which has entrances both on South Main Street, at the foot of College Hill, and Benefit Street further uphill. The building houses the Rhode Island Supreme Court, the state's highest court of appeal, as well as the Superior Court of Providence County and the Rhode Island Office of the Attorney General. Several blocks north along Benefit Street is the Old State House, originally built as the Colony House in 1762. Another public building on Benefit Street is the State Arsenal designed by Russell Warren in 1839.

== Demographics ==
For census purposes, the Census Bureau classifies College Hill as part of the Census Tract Area 36.01 and 36.02. This neighborhood had 9,124 inhabitants based on data from the 2020 United States Census.

The racial makeup of the neighborhood was 51.4% (5,330) White (Non-Hispanic), 6.6% (601) Black (Non-Hispanic), 20.5% (1,869) Asian, 5% (457) from some other race or from two or more races. Hispanic or Latino of any race were 9.5% (867) of the population. 18.1% are foreign born, with most foreign born residents originating from Asia (57.4%).

The median age in this area is around 21 years old. Family Households made up 12.6% of the population, and the average household (family and non-family) had around 2 persons living there. 12.2% of the population was married. Out of the 1,975 vacant and non-vacant housing units, 40.8% were owner occupied, and 47.1% renter occupied. The average house was worth significantly higher than the average in Providence.

== Universities and schools ==
College Hill is home to Brown University's main campus, and most of the Rhode Island School of Design, whose buildings are adjacent to Brown, along the western slope of College Hill.

The Moses Brown School, on Lloyd Avenue (the summit of College Hill) and the Wheeler School, on Hope Street, are notable private schools in the neighborhood. Hope High School is located at the corner of Hope and Olney Streets, is one of Providence's major public high schools.

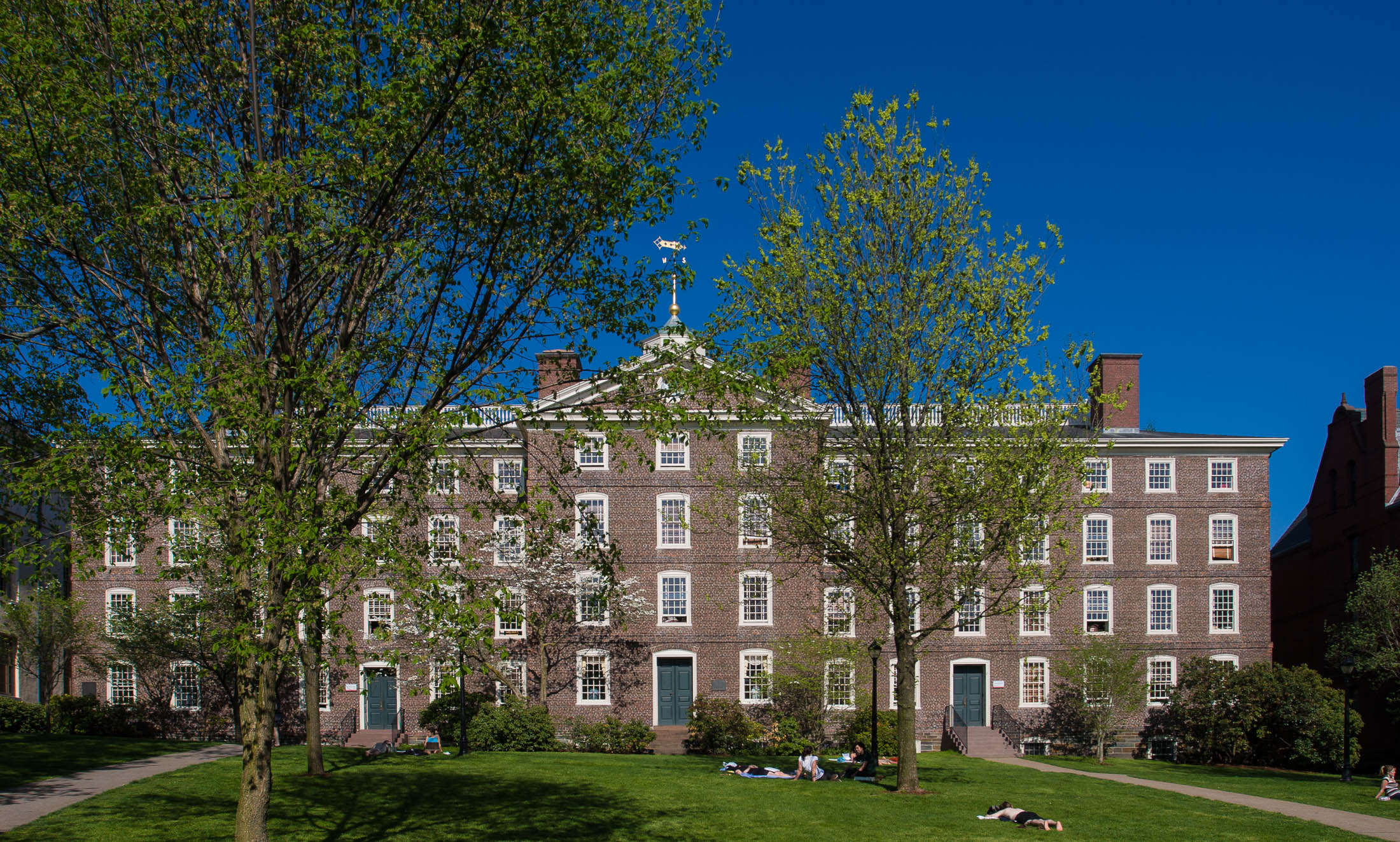
University Hall (1770) at Brown University

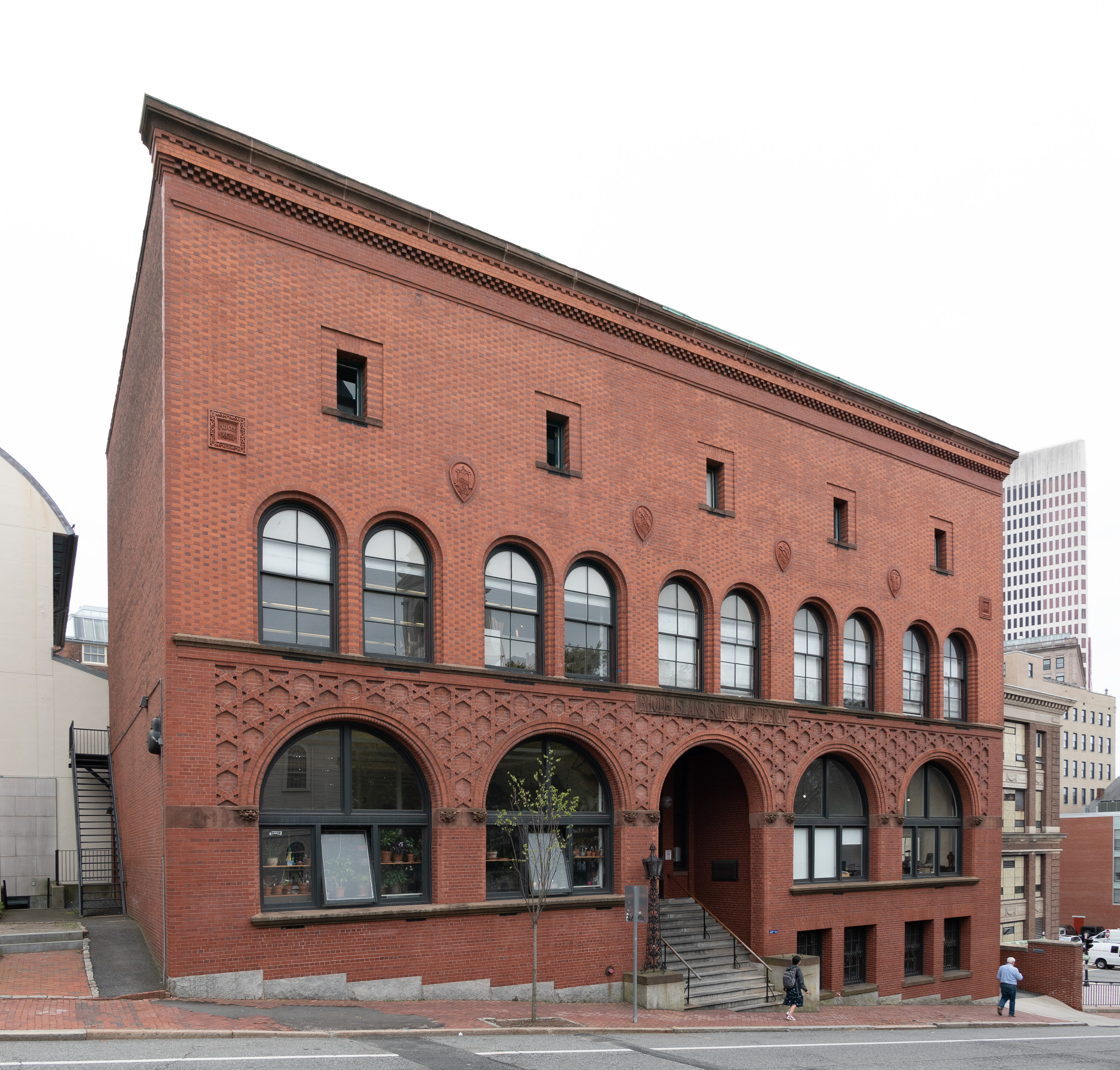
The Rhode Island School of Design's Waterman Building (1893)

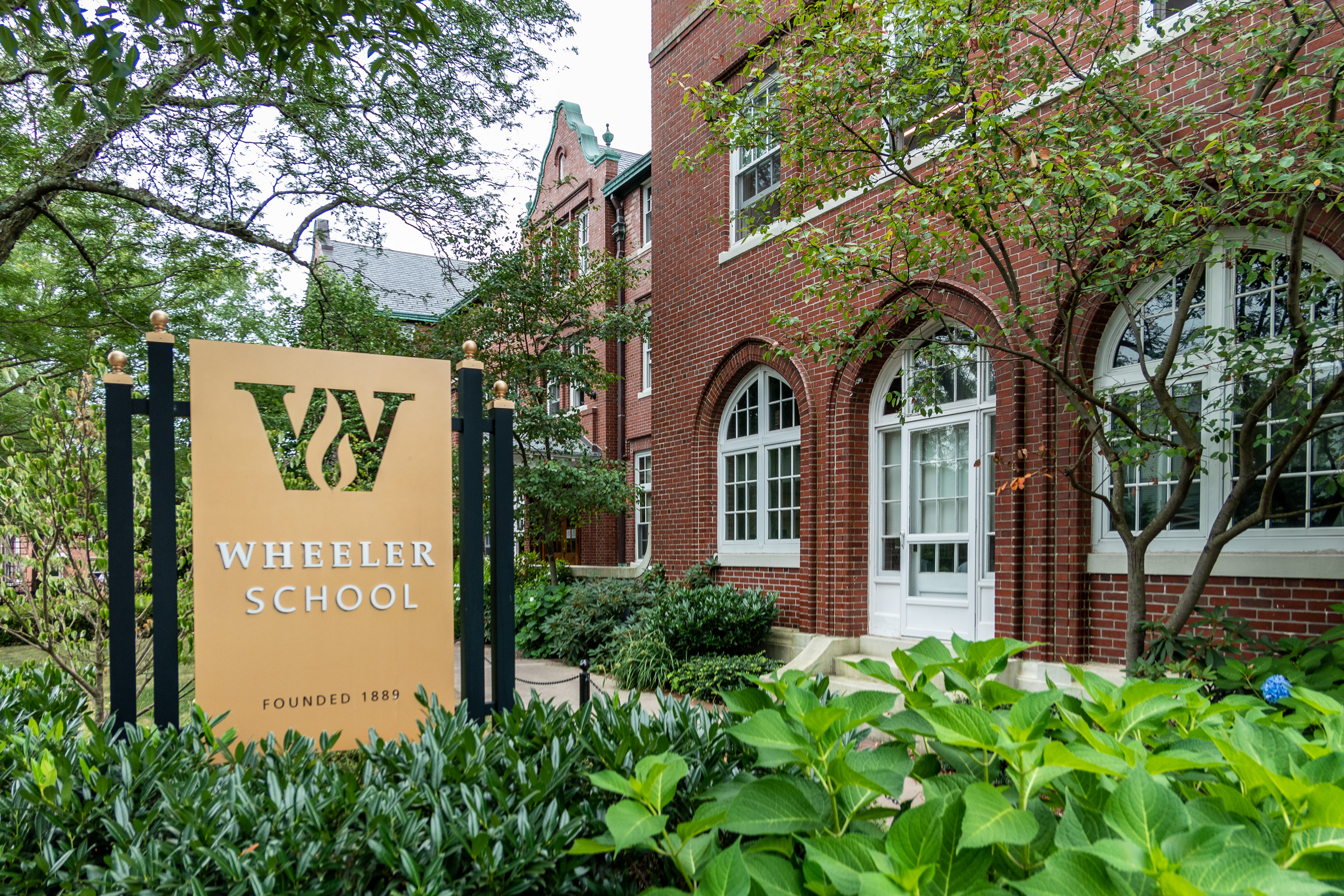
Entrance to the Wheeler School

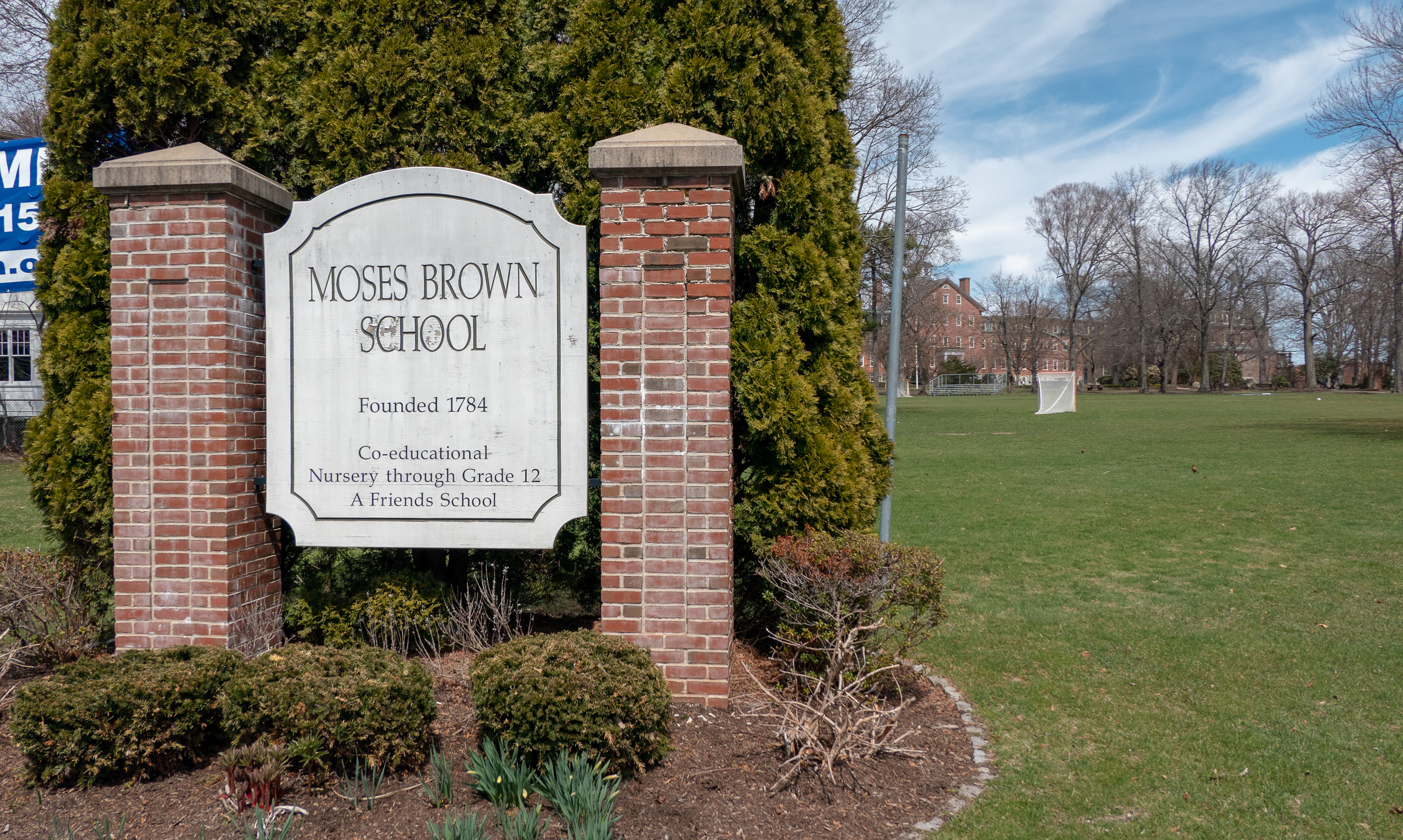
A sign at the front of the Moses Brown School

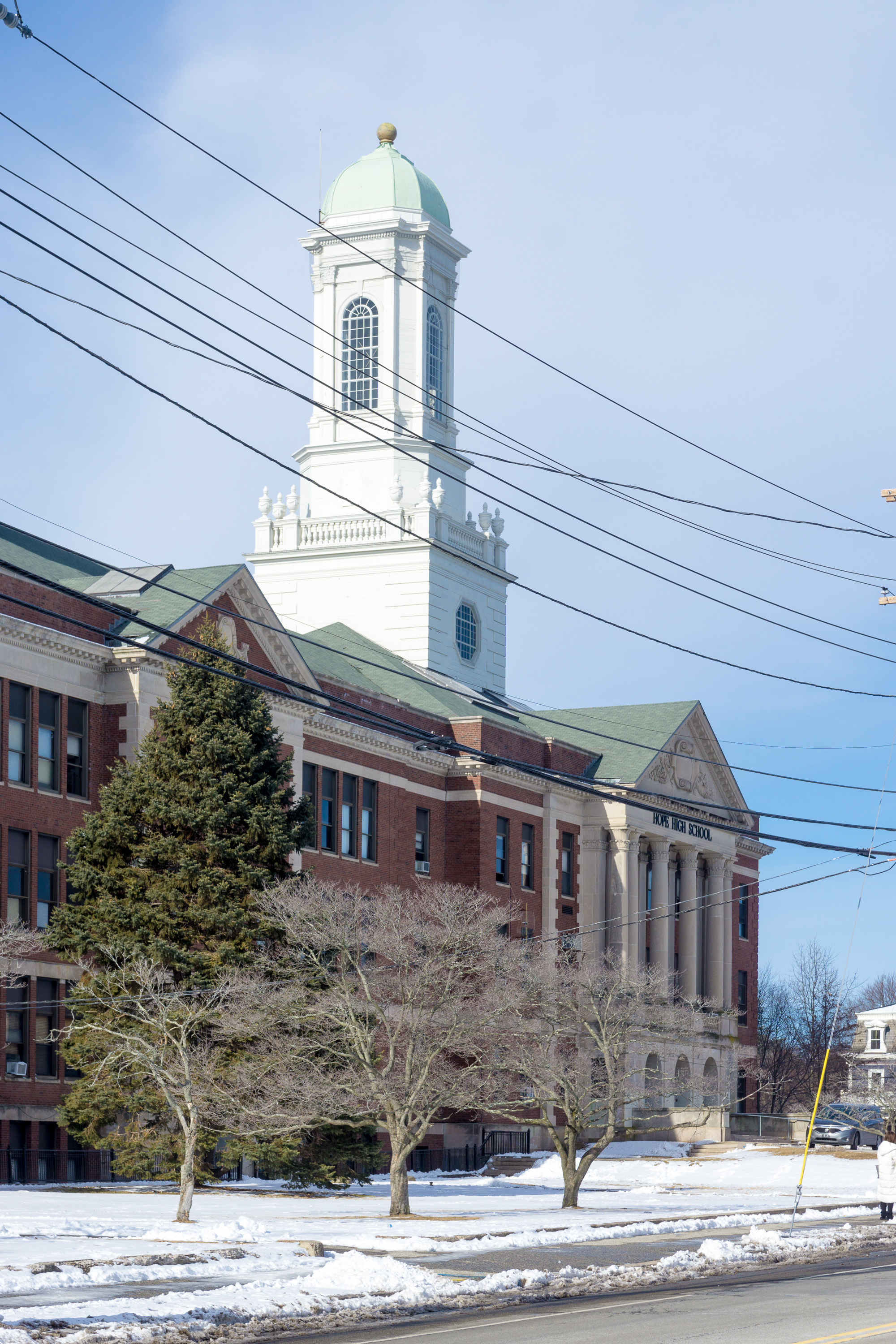
The 1936 building of Hope High School

== Commerce ==
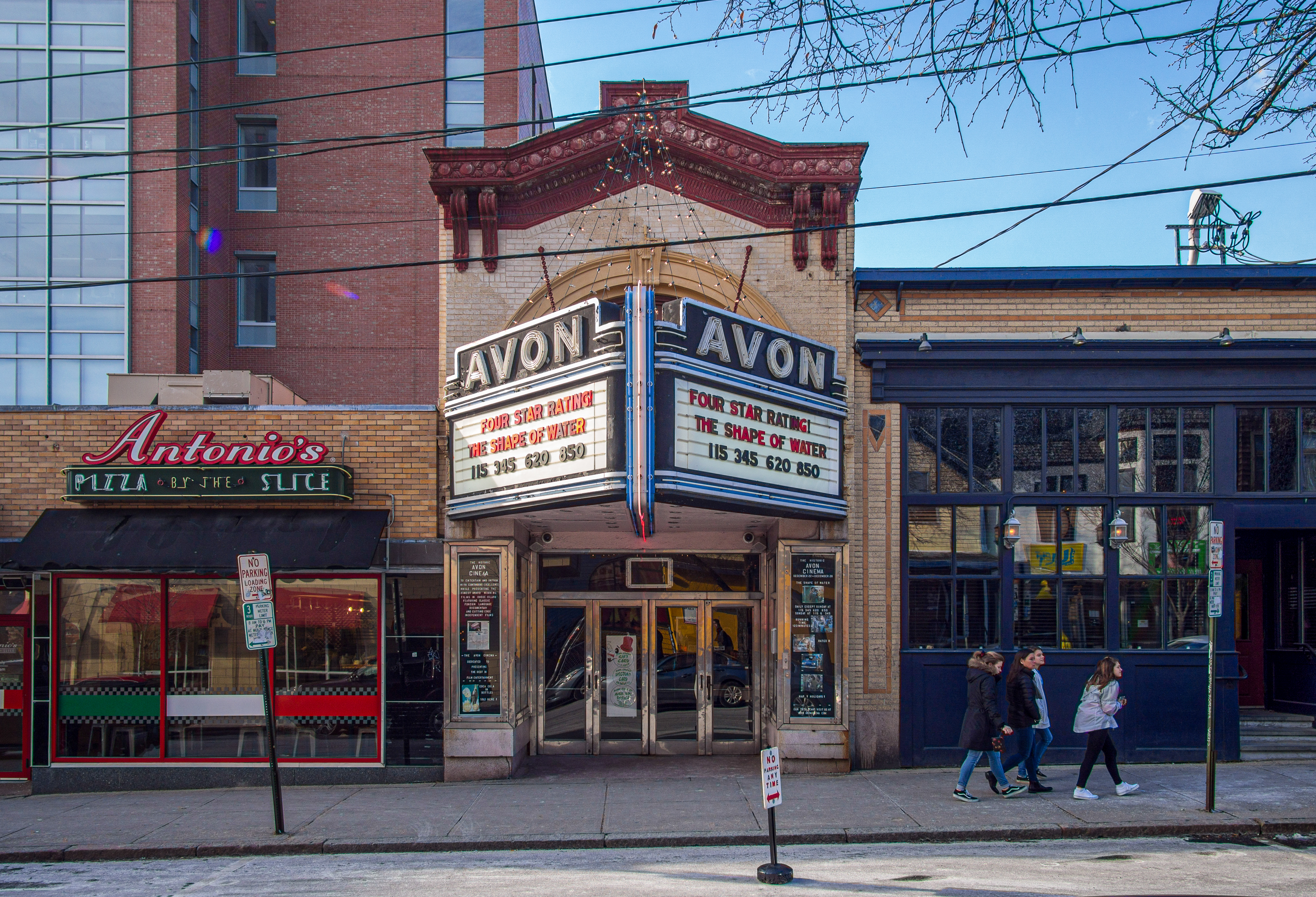
Thayer Street is the central commercial area of College Hill

=== Thayer Street ===
Numerous cafes, restaurants, and shops are located along Thayer Street, adjoining Brown University at Soldier's Arch. Both streets are home to numerous small and independent shops, though Thayer Street has a few chain stores. Brown University's bookstore is located on Thayer.

Thayer Street's Avon Cinema, dating back to the early twentieth century, is a noted College Hill landmark.

== Parks ==
- Prospect Terrace Park is located on top of College Hill, and allows for a scenic view of Downtown Providence, and the city and county beyond.
- Riverwalk, located along the Providence River, is where part of the WaterFire festival is held.
- Roger Williams National Memorial is on North Main Street.
- Veterans' Memorial Park and Market Square is between South Main Street and Canal Street.

== Landmarks ==
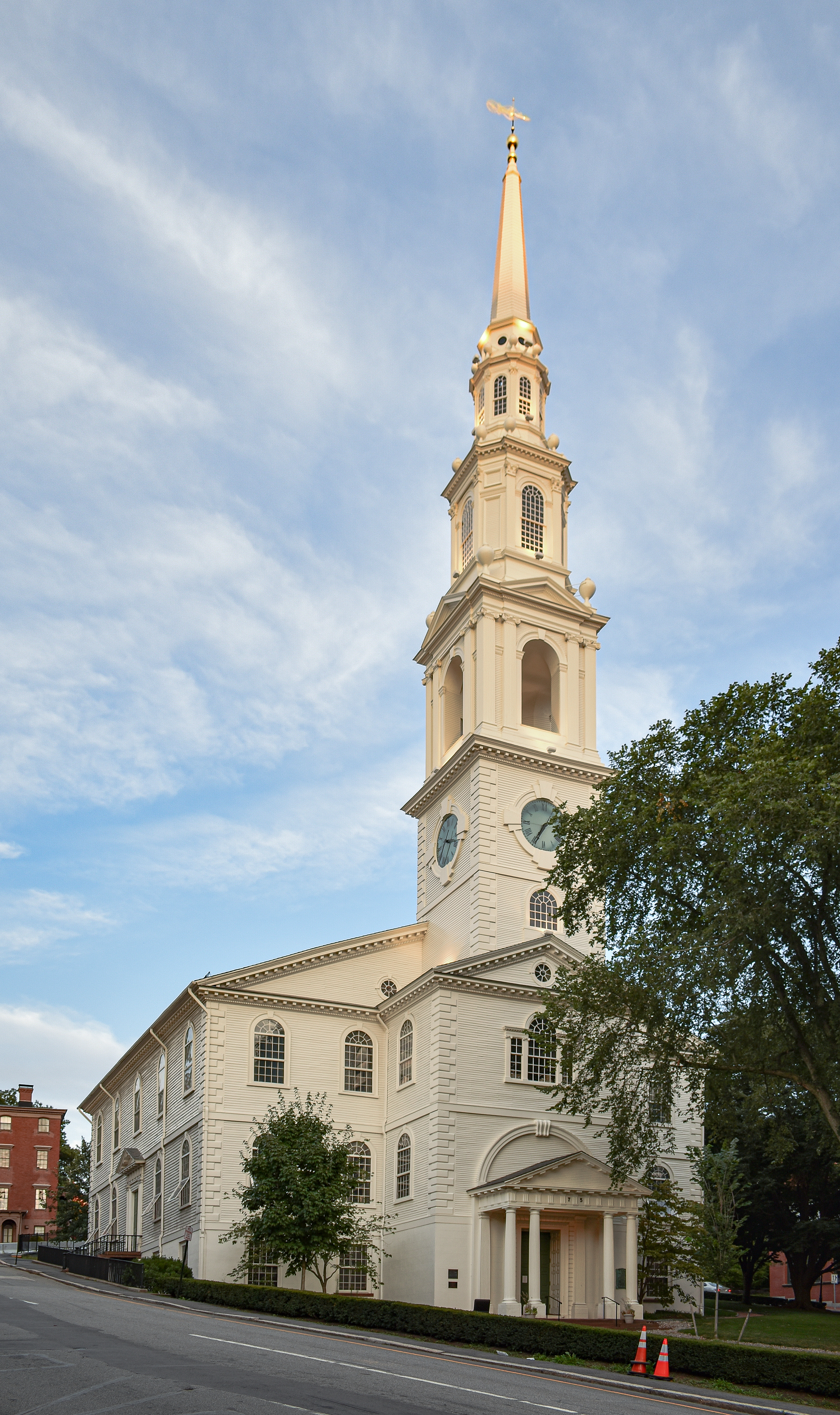
First Baptist Church in America

The base (western edge) of College Hill is the oldest area of the city. The College Hill Historic District includes much of the area, and has been recognized as a National Historic Landmark District by the Department of the Interior. The Providence Preservation Society and the Rhode Island Historical Society have preserved numerous historic buildings in the College Hill area.

Landmarks include:

- The Rhode Island School of Design Museum
- The Old State House
- The First Baptist Church in America
- The First Christian Science Church on Meeting Street, a domed church on Meeting Street.
- The Central Congregational Church
- The Providence Athenaeum, the fourth-oldest library in America, located on Benefit Street
- State Arsenal, an armory in service during the American Civil War, and the original headquarters of the Rhode Island State Police
- The Shunned House
- Dr. Willett house, 10 Barnes Street
- Ward house, 140 Prospect Street
- 456 Angell Street, birthplace of H.P. Lovecraft (formerly numbered as 194 Angell Street)
- Market House
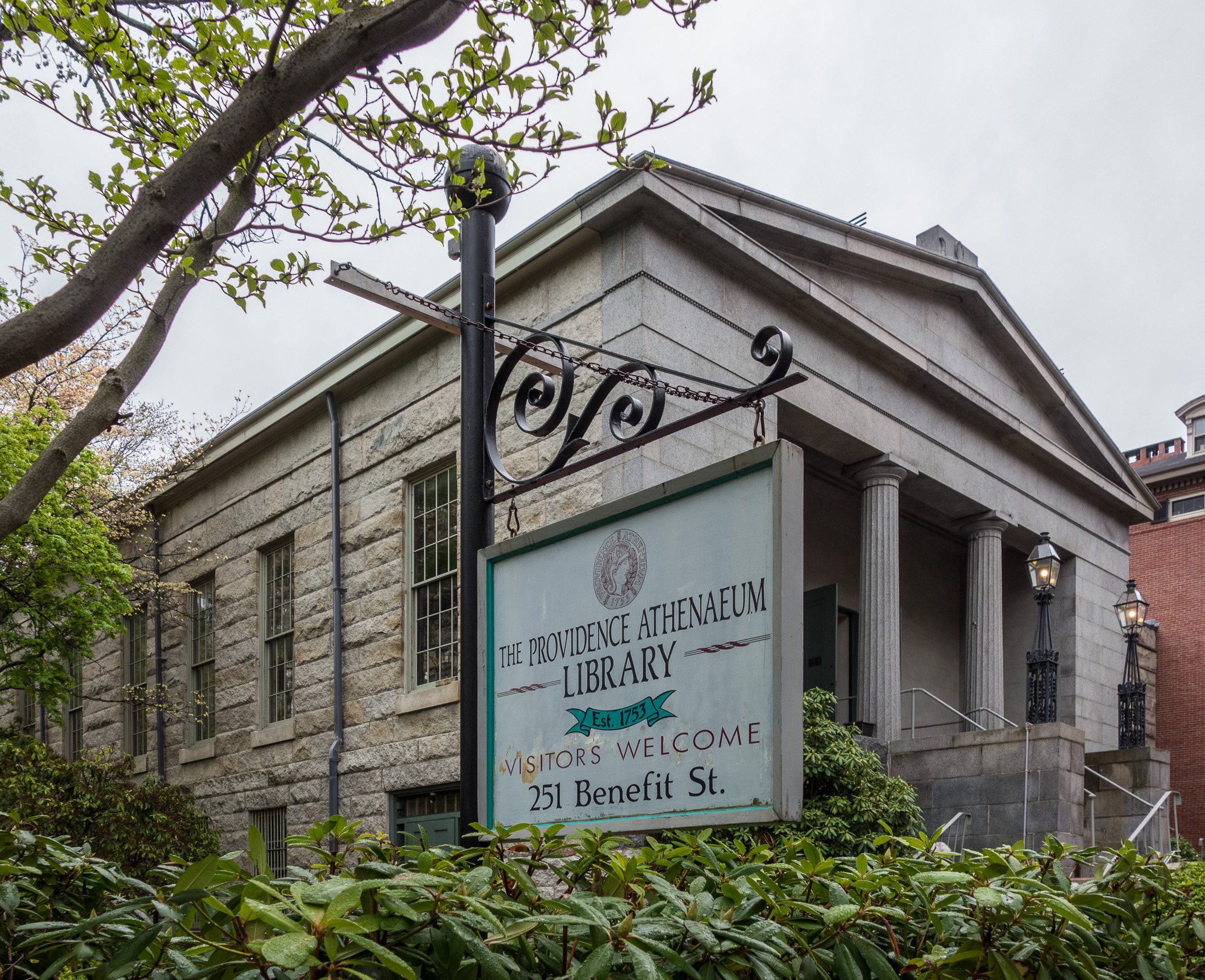
The Providence Athenaeum

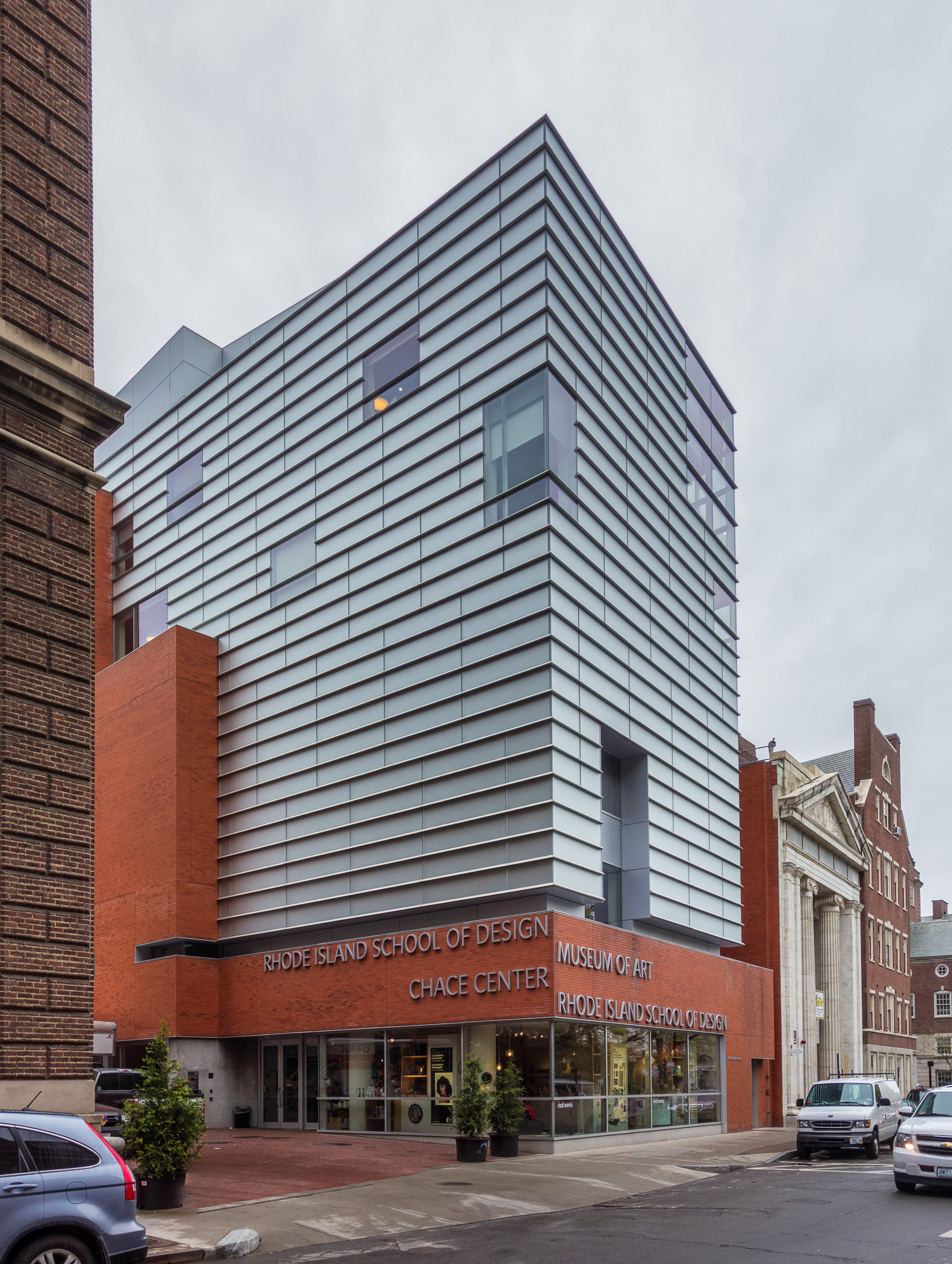
The RISD Museum of Art

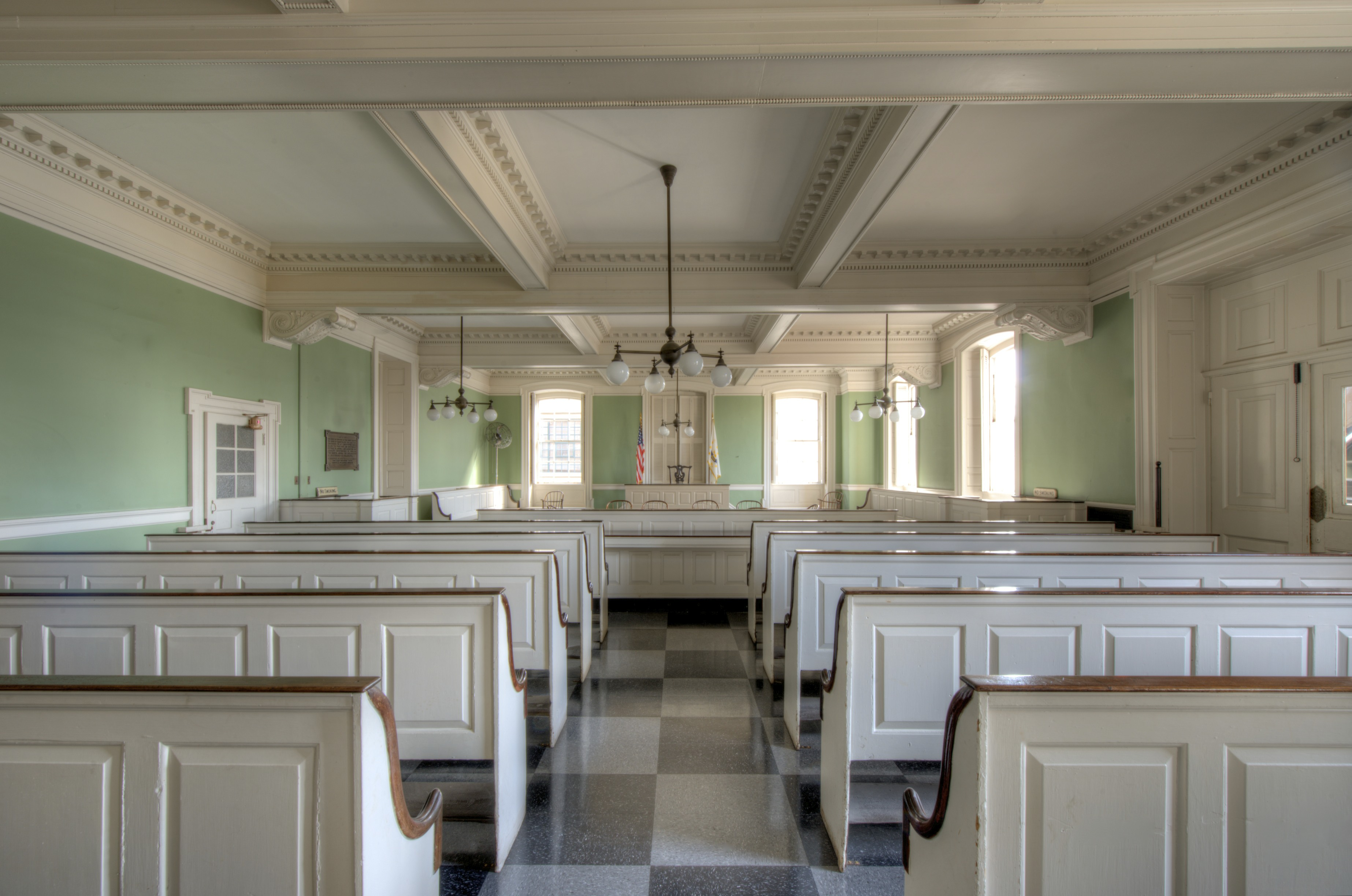
The Old State House

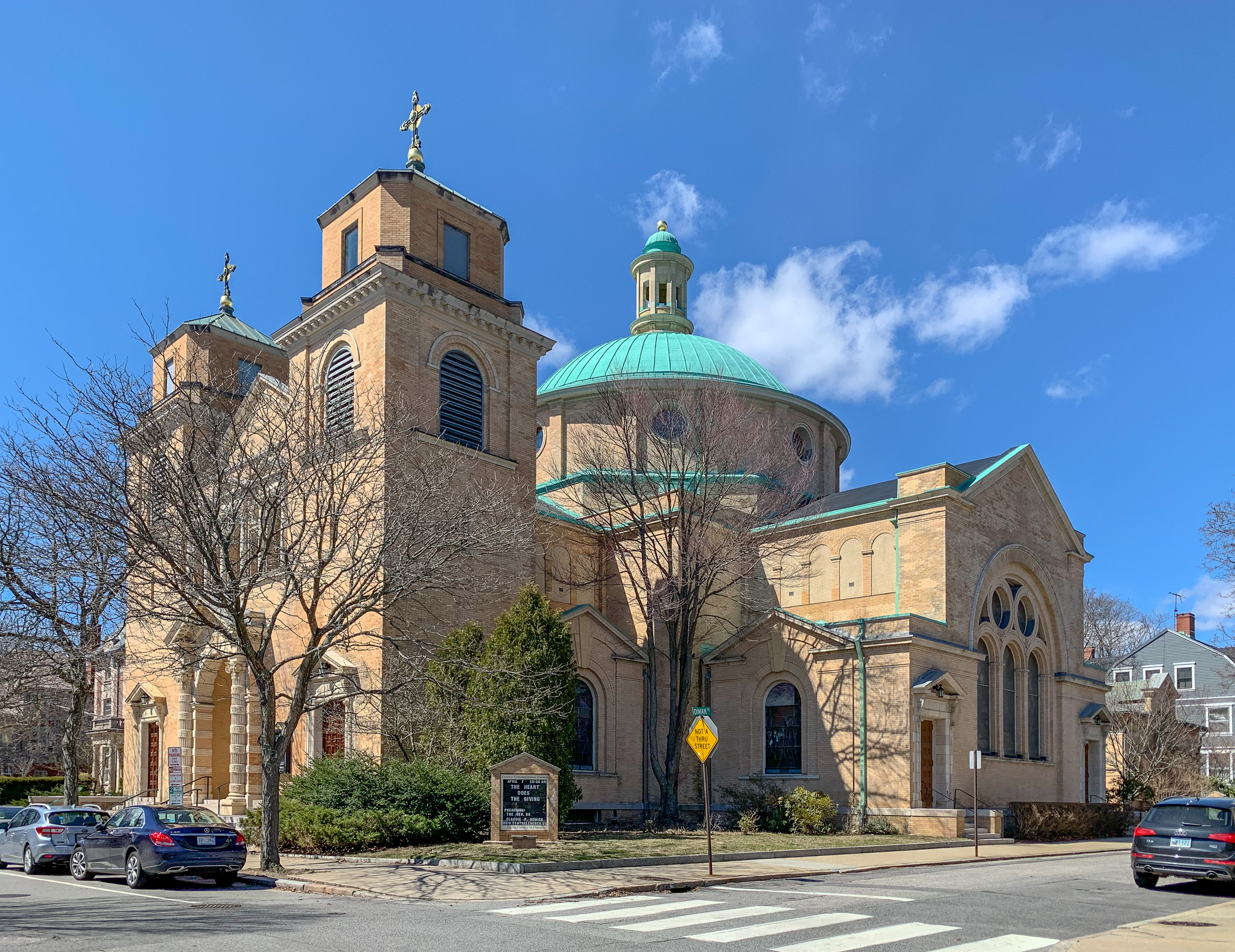
The Central Congregational Church

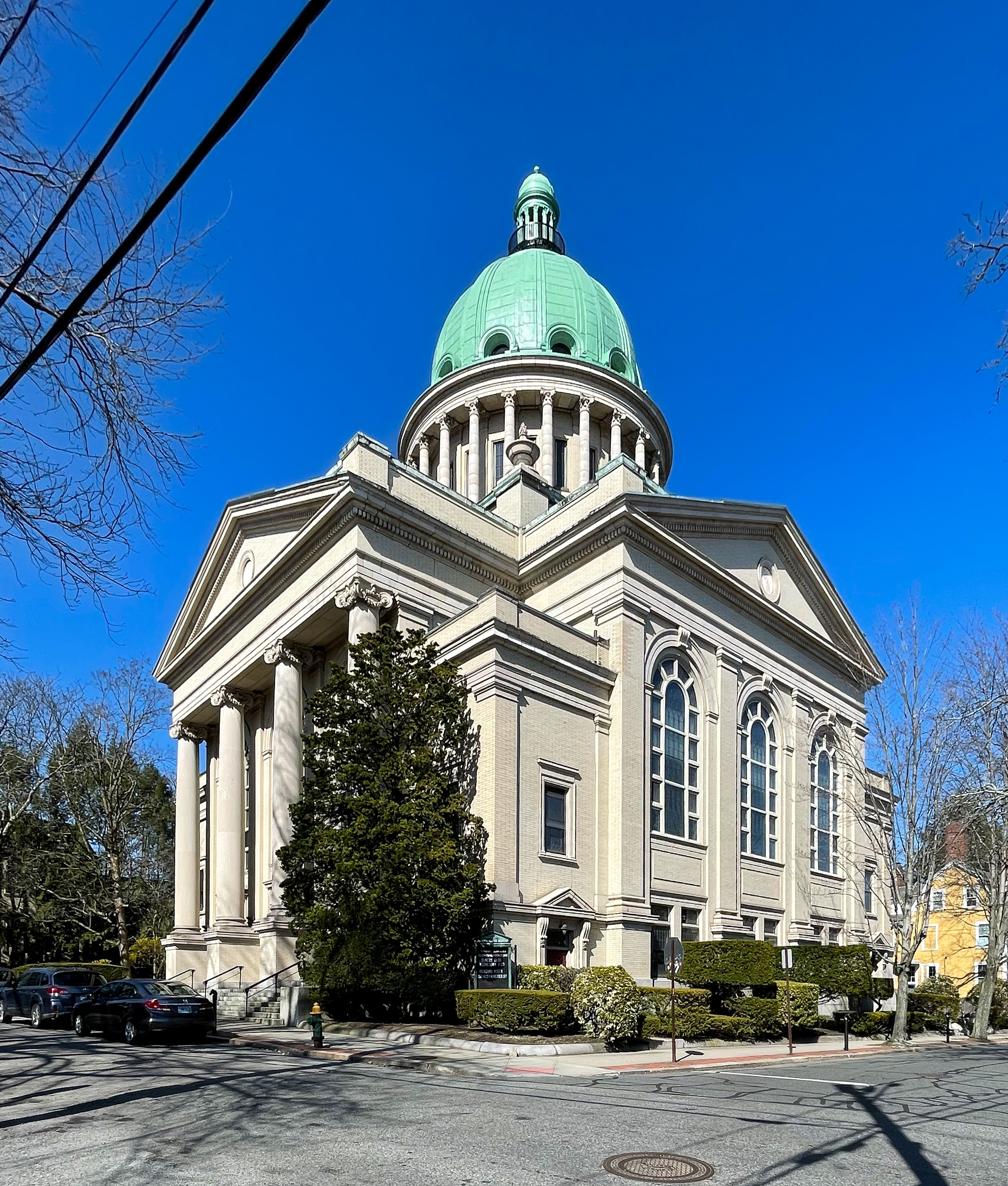
First Church of Christ Scientist

== College Hill in popular culture ==
- "The Shunned House", a short story by H. P. Lovecraft
- The Case of Charles Dexter Ward, a novel by H. P. Lovecraft
- The Devil Wears Prada a novel by Lauren Weisberger
- Underdog, a superhero film
- Family Guy scene locations, including Brown University, Roger Williams National Memorial Park, John Brown House, Providence Fire Station No. 5, and North Main vantage
- Providence Athenaeum, location where Sarah Helen Whitman broke off her relationship with Edgar Allan Poe

== Notable people ==
- Ambrose Burnside (military officer, politician, firearms, railroad exec.)
- Stephen Hopkins (politician)
- Sarah Helen Whitman
