= Edward Dexter House =

Historic house in Rhode Island, United States

- U.S. National Register of Historic Places
- U.S. National Historic Landmark District – Contributing property
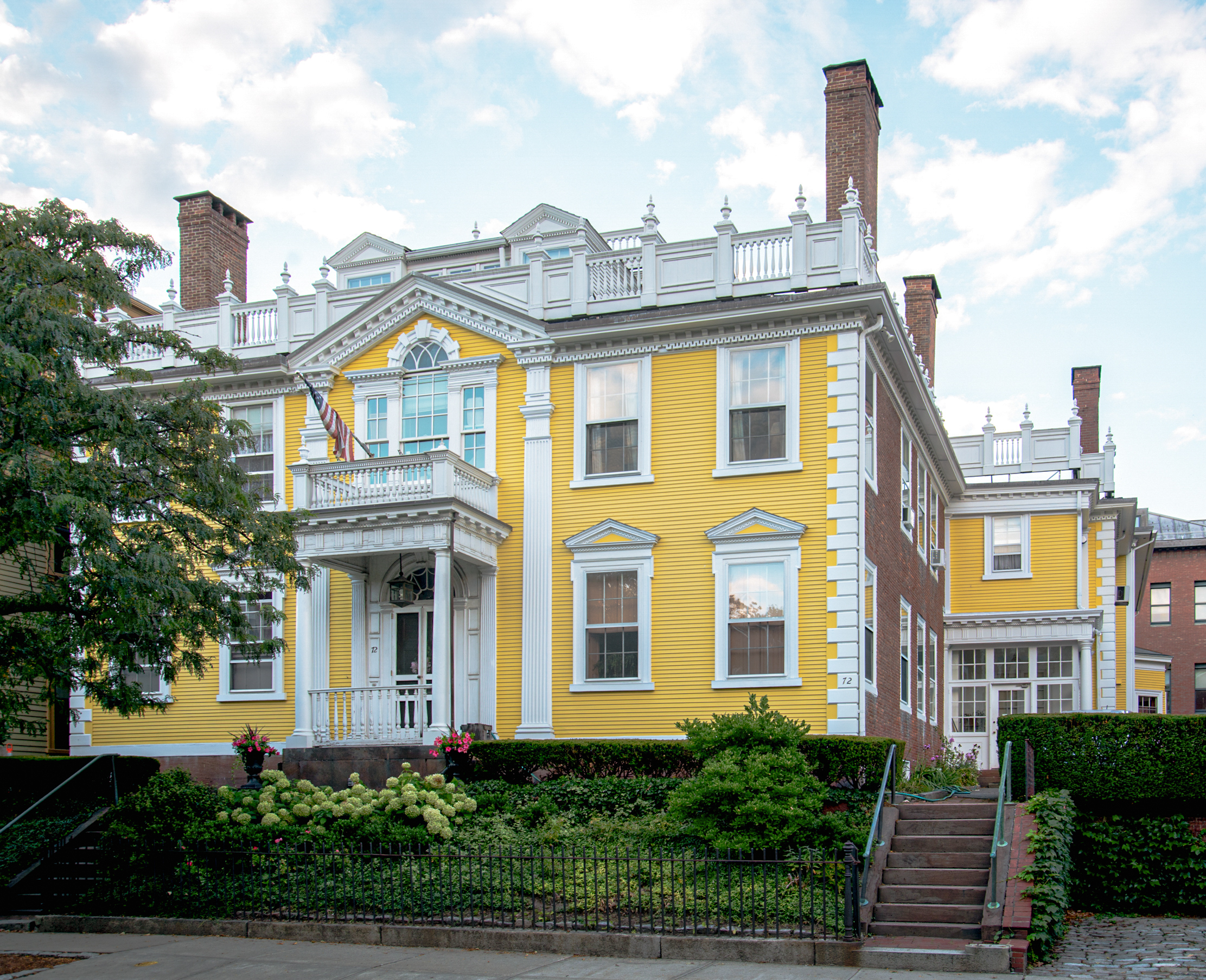

- Location within Rhode Island Location within the United States
- Location: 72 Waterman Street, Providence, Rhode Island
- Coordinates: 41°49′37″N 71°24′15″W
- Built: 1795
- Architectural style: Georgian, Federal
- Part of: College Hill Historic District (ID70000019)
- NRHP reference No.: 71000033

Significant dates
- Added to NRHP: June 21, 1971
- Designated NHLDCP: November 10, 1970

The Edward Dexter House is a historic house in the College Hill neighborhood of Providence, Rhode Island. It is a 2 1/2-story wood-frame structure, built in 1795–1797, with a hip roof topped by a square monitor. Its main facade is five bays wide, with the center bay flanked by two-story pilasters and topped by a small gable pediment. The well-preserved interior provided a template for an early-20th-century museum space designed by the Rhode Island School of Design to house a furniture collection donated by the house's then-owner, Charles Pendleton. The house is one of the few 18th-century houses in the city's College Hill neighborhood. It was originally located at the corner of George and Prospect Streets; in 1860 it was sawed in half and moved in sections to its present location.

The house was listed on the National Register of Historic Places in 1971.

== Gallery ==
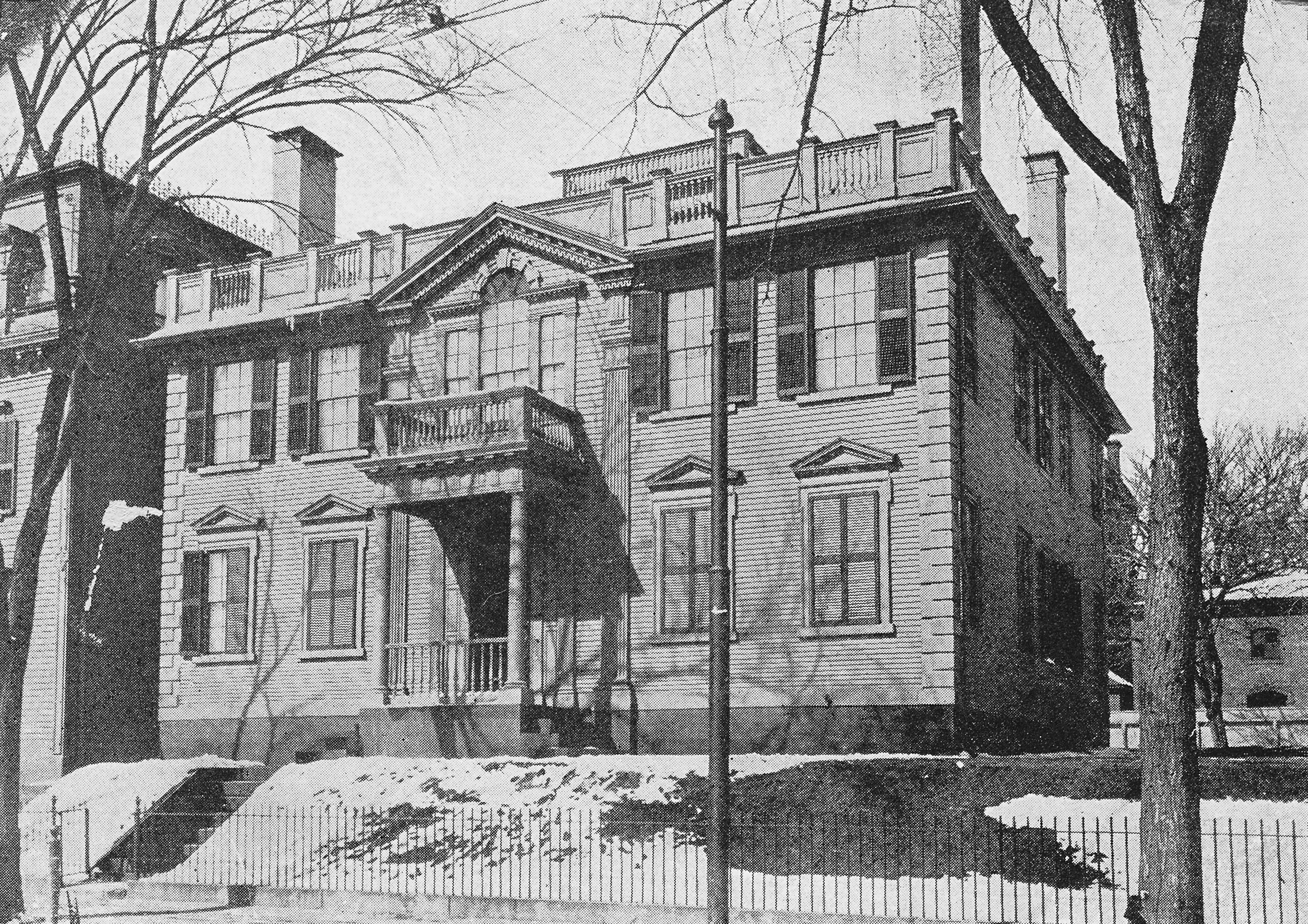
The house, circa 1915

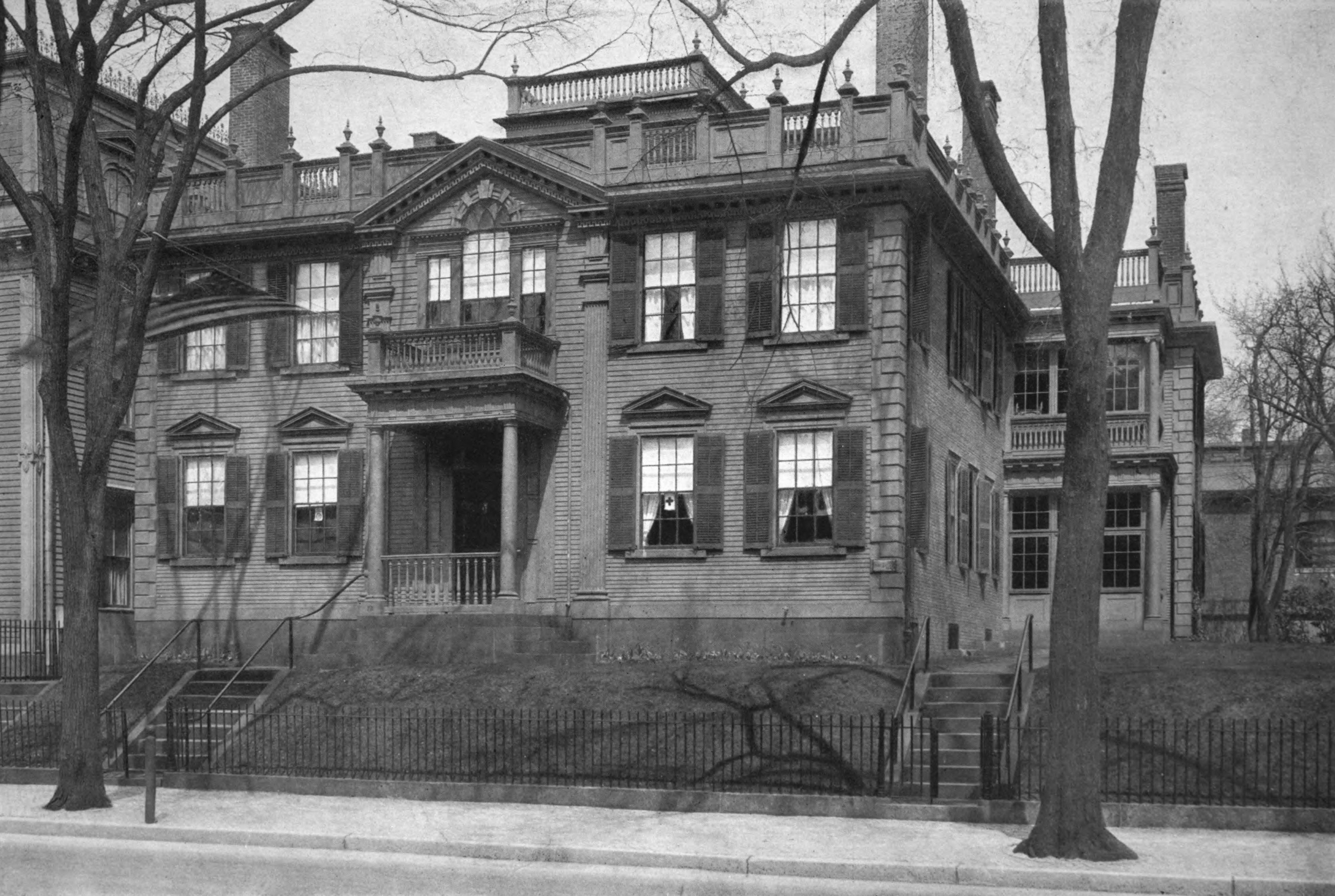
The house in 1918, following an addition to the building's rear

== See also ==
- National Register of Historic Places listings in Providence, Rhode Island
