= List of National Natural Landmarks in Rhode Island =

There is one National Natural Landmark in Rhode Island.

Rhode Island National Natural Landmarks (clickable map)

Name	Image	Date	Location	County	Ownership	Description
Ell Pond		May 1974	Rockville, Rhode Island 41.505331°N 71.782908°W	Rhode Island	private	This kettle hole is surrounded by a swamp of red maple and Atlantic white cypress with steep granitic monadnocks. There is a rare mix of both hydrophytic and xeric plants.

== See also ==
- List of National Historic Landmarks in Rhode Island
