= Corliss–Carrington House =

Historic house in Rhode Island, United States

- U.S. National Register of Historic Places
- U.S. National Historic Landmark
- U.S. National Historic Landmark District – Contributing property
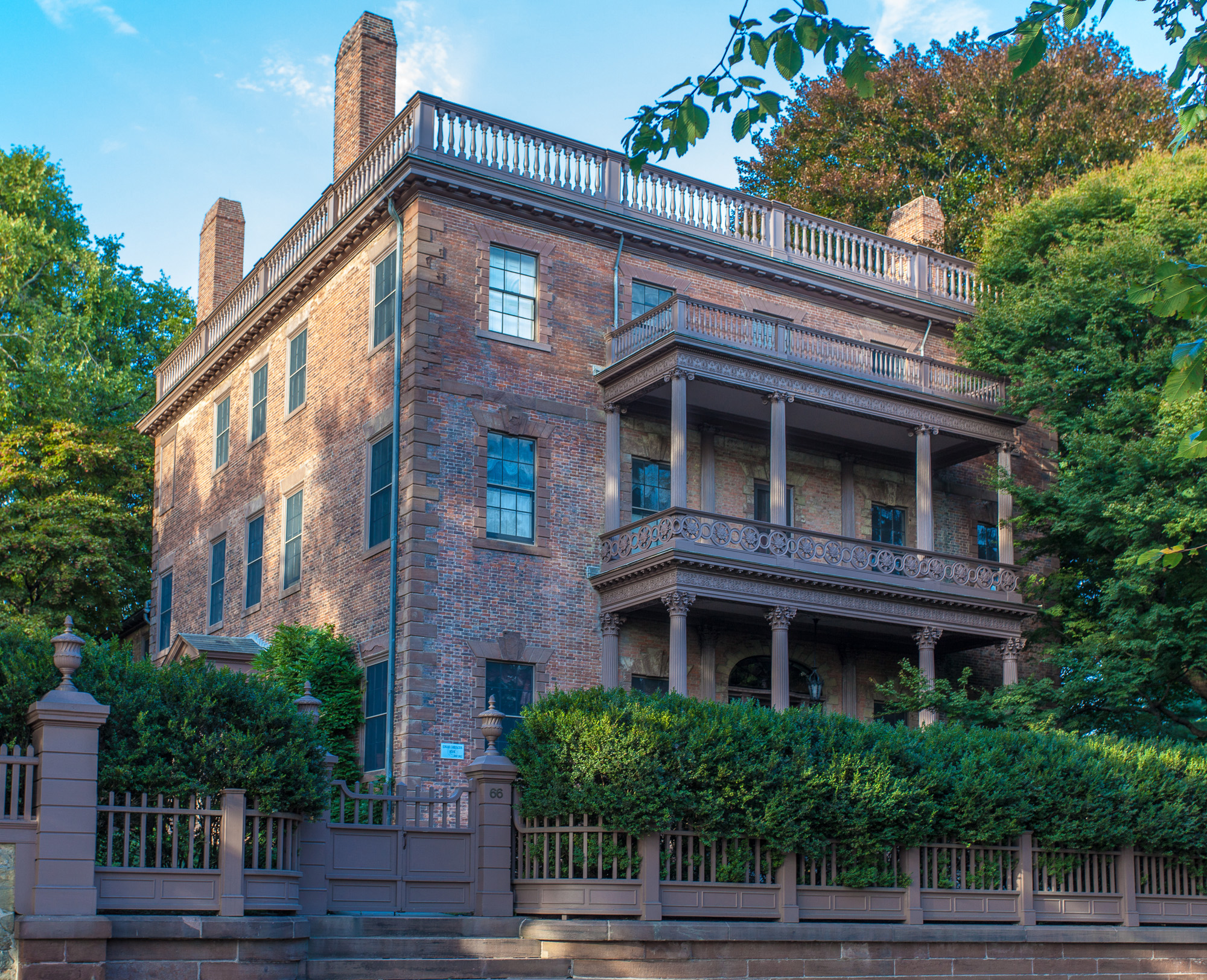
- Front elevation, 2008

- Location within Rhode Island Location within the United States
- Location: 66 Williams Street; Providence, RI
- Coordinates: 41°49′21″N 71°24′06″W
- Built: 1812
- Architectural style: Federal
- Part of: College Hill Historic District (ID70000019)
- NRHP reference No.: 70000020

Significant dates
- Added to NRHP: December 30, 1970
- Designated NHL: December 30, 1970

The Corliss–Carrington House is a National Historic Landmark house at 66 Williams Street in the College Hill neighborhood of Providence, Rhode Island. Built in 1812, it is significant as a high-quality and well-preserved example of an Adamesque-Federal style town house.

== Description ==
The house is a large three-story brick structure, trimmed in brownstone. The front facade is five bays wide, with corners trimmed with brownstone quoining. The window bays are also lined with quoining and topped by flat-arch brownstone with keystones. The center three bays of the front facade are sheltered by a two-story porch, supported on the first floor by fluted cast iron Corinthian columns, and on the second by fluted wooden Ionic columns. The main entrance is flanked by sidelight windows and topped by an elliptical fanlight.

The interior follows a typical Federal plan, with an expansive central hallway flanked by two rooms on each side. An archway with a leaded fanlight separates the immediate entry area from the spiral staircase that provides access to the second floor. The parlor to the right of the entry is the finest chamber, decorated with original Chinese-style wallpaper and elaborate woodwork, said to be the design of John Holden Greene. The fireplace mantels in this and other first-floor rooms are all Greek Revival replacements.

== History ==
The house was built in 1810–11 by John Corliss, a prominent Providence businessman, and was originally two stories in height. In 1812 it was purchased by Edward Carrington, who added the third floor and the front porch. The house remained in the Carrington family until 1936, when it was given to the Rhode Island School of Design. It was sold by the school to private owners in 1961, and is not open to the public.

It was declared a National Historic Landmark and listed on the National Register of Historic Places in 1970.

On December 17, 2019, Rhode Island Businessman and former mayoral candidate, Lorne Adrain, announced the purchase of the home for use as the headquarters of his program "Global Fellows in Courage".

In 2023, the house was listed for sale with an asking price of $7.45 million.

== See also ==
- List of National Historic Landmarks in Rhode Island
- National Register of Historic Places listings in Providence, Rhode Island

== Images ==
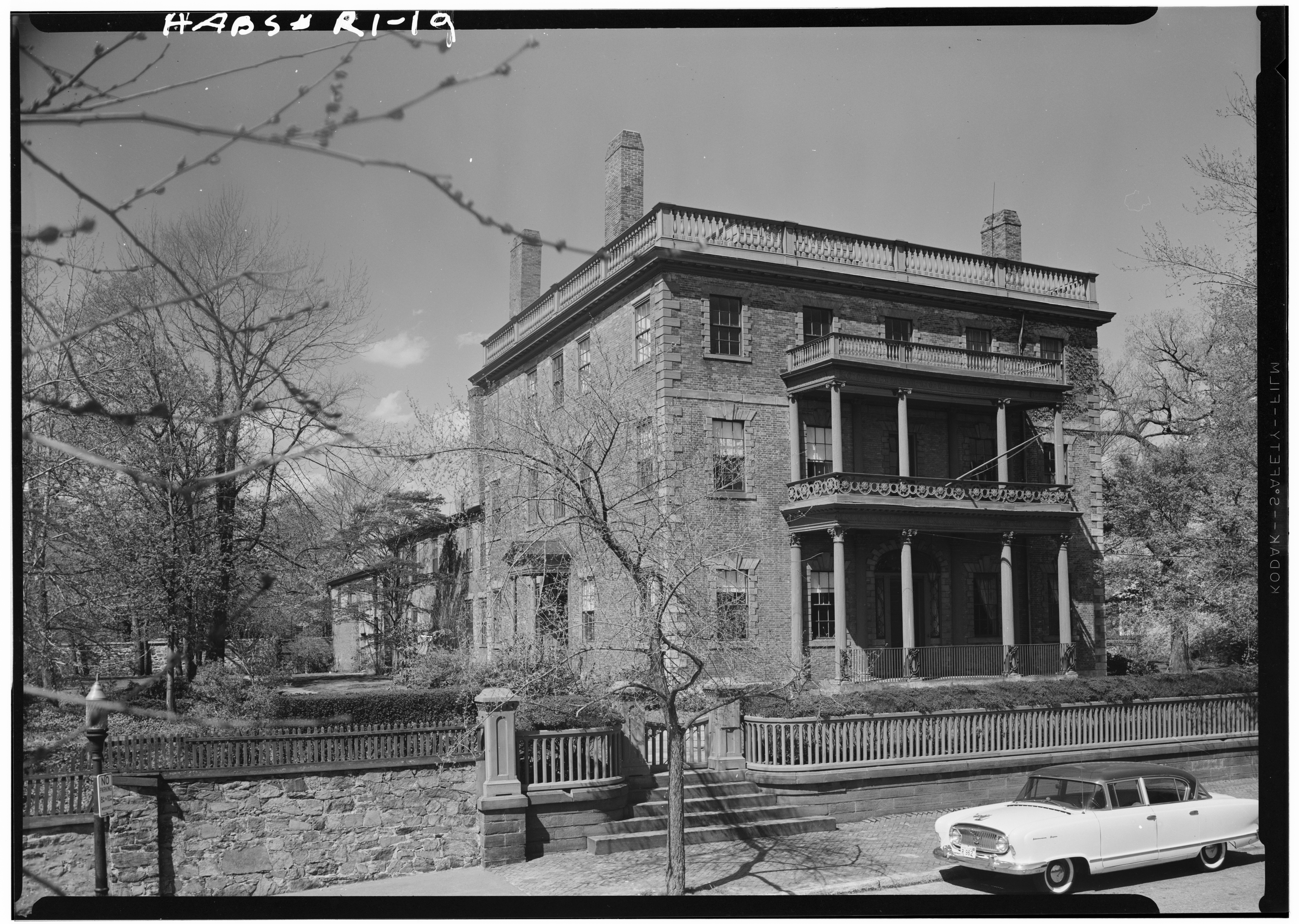
South and West Elevations, 1958

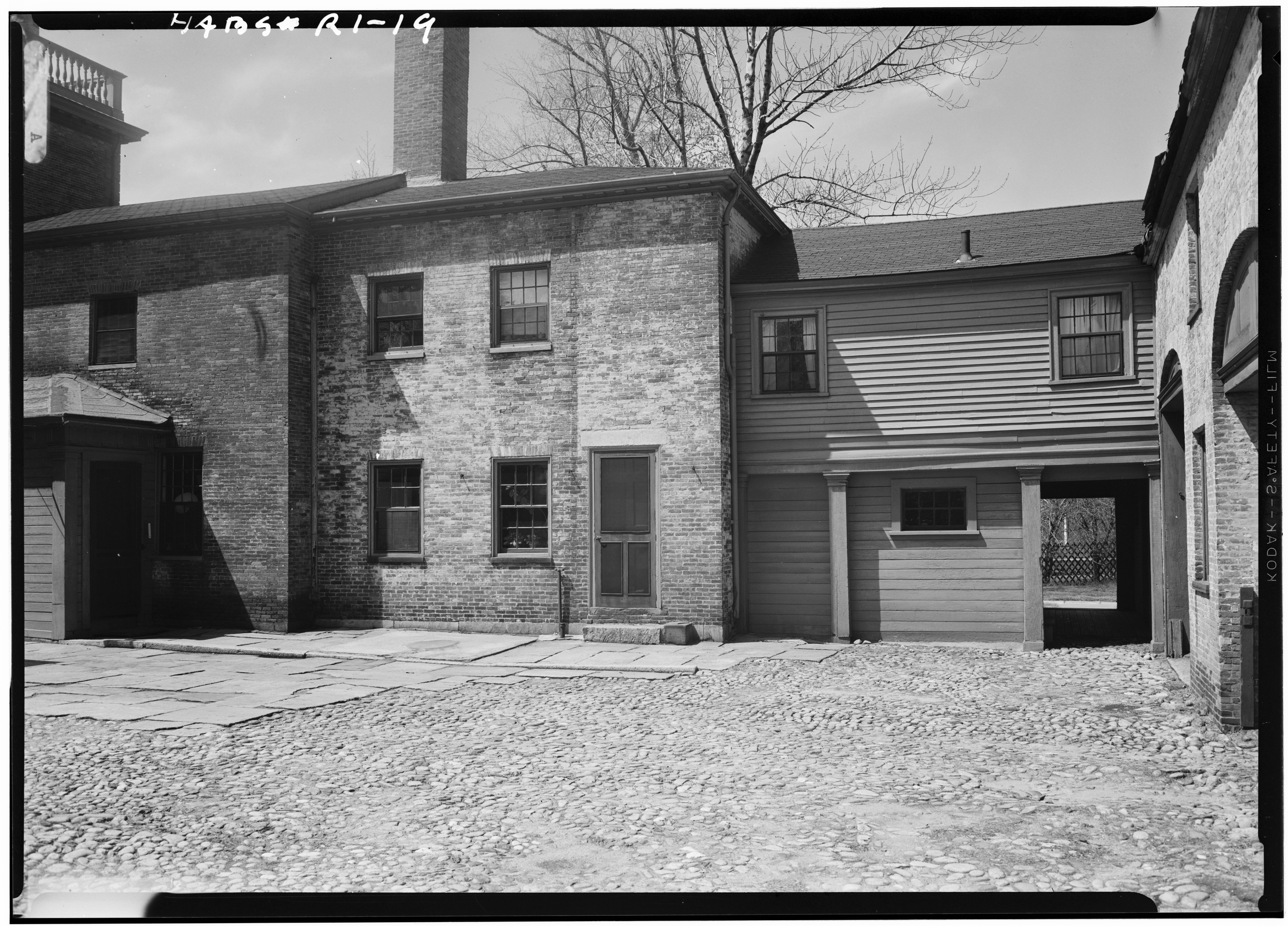
Rear courtyrard showing rear wing of house, 1958

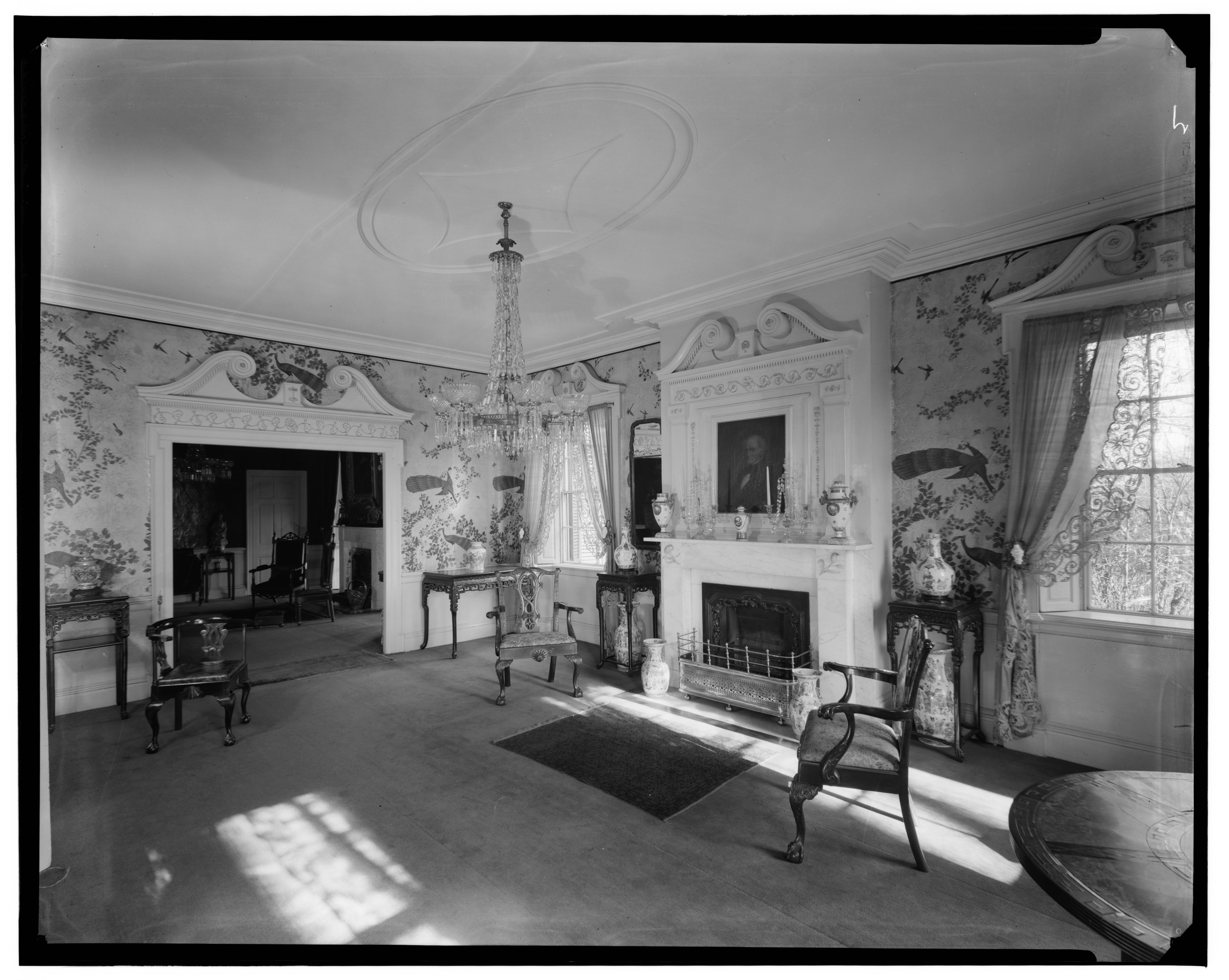
South Parlor
