= List of National Historic Landmarks in Rhode Island =

This article provide a List of National Historic Landmarks in Rhode Island. There are 45 National Historic Landmarks (NHLs) in Rhode Island. In addition there are two National Park Service administered or affiliated areas of national historic importance in the state.

Rhode Island's National Historic Landmarks are distributed across all five of Rhode Island's counties.

== Key ==
	National Historic Landmark
^{†}	National Historic Landmark District
^{#}	National Historic Site, National Historical Park, National Memorial, or National Monument
^{*}	Delisted Landmark

== List ==
	Landmark name	Image	Date designated	Location	County	Description
1	Nelson W. Aldrich House	Nelson W. Aldrich House	December 8, 1976 (#76000040)	Providence; 41°49′30″N 71°23′44″W	Providence	Federal-style home of Aldrich, a U.S. Senator and one of the most powerful men in Washington around the turn of the 20th century. Today home to the Rhode Island Historical Society.
2	Westminster Arcade	Westminster Arcade	May 11, 1976 (#71000029)	Providence; 41°49′27″N 71°24′39″W	Providence	First enclosed shopping mall in U.S., built in 1828.
3	Eleazer Arnold House	Eleazer Arnold House	November 24, 1968 (#68000006)	Lincoln; 41°54′03″N 71°25′13″W	Providence	Arnold House, 1691.
4	Isaac Bell House	Isaac Bell House	September 25, 1997 (#97001276)	Newport; 41°28′45″N 71°18′42″W	Newport	First major Shingle-style house
5^{†}	Bellevue Avenue Historic District	Bellevue Avenue Historic District	May 11, 1976 (#72000023)	Newport; 41°28′13″N 71°18′26″W	Newport	Mansions, many exemplary of period styles, built here by summer vacationers in late 19th and early 20th centuries.
6	Block Island South East Light	Block Island South East Light	September 25, 1997 (#97001264)	New Shoreham; 41°09′35″N 71°32′50″W	Washington	An 1874 Victorian Gothic brick lighthouse.
7	The Breakers	The Breakers	October 12, 1994 (#71000019)	Newport; 41°28′11″N 71°17′55″W	Newport	This mansion was built in the 1890s as the summer house of Cornelius Vanderbilt II.
8	Brick Market	Brick Market	October 9, 1960 (#66000019)	Newport; 41°29′24″N 71°18′55″W	Newport	Sophisticated Classical-style Colonial building.
9	John Brown House	John Brown House	November 24, 1968 (#68000007)	Providence; 41°49′22″N 71°24′13″W	Providence	Georgian home of John Brown, Providence merchant and benefactor of Brown University, built in 1786.
10	Chateau-sur-Mer	Chateau-sur-Mer	February 17, 2006 (#68000002)	Newport; 41°28′16″N 71°18′19″W	Newport	This 1852 French villa was built for merchant William Shepard Wetmore. It was the first great Newport mansion of the late 19th century.
11	Cocumscossoc Archeological Site	Cocumscossoc Archeological Site	April 12, 1993 (#93000605)	Wickford; 41°35′00″N 71°27′16″W	Washington	Area around Smith's Castle, one of Rhode Island's oldest houses, built on the site of an early trading post established by Roger Williams.
12^{†}	College Hill Historic District	College Hill Historic District	December 30, 1970 (#70000019)	Providence; 41°49′35″N 71°24′12″W	Providence	Original 120 acres (30 ha) of Providence as laid out by Roger Williams; today populated by many well-preserved historic homes, Brown University, and Rhode Island School of Design.
13	Corliss-Carrington House	Corliss-Carrington House	December 30, 1970 (#70000020)	Providence; 41°49′20″N 71°24′08″W	Providence	Well-preserved example of an Adamesque-Federal style townhouse from 1812, with decorative wrought iron columns.
14	Crescent Park Looff Carousel	Crescent Park Looff Carousel	February 27, 1987 (#76000045)	East Providence; 41°45′23″N 71°21′33″W	Providence	Well-preserved, working carousel by Charles I.D. Looff from 1895; extremely detailed workmanship.
15	The Elms	The Elms	June 19, 1996 (#71000021)	Newport; 41°29′08″N 71°18′14″W	Newport	Summer "cottage" and estate of Edward J. Berwind in Classical Revival style.
16	First Baptist Meetinghouse	First Baptist Meetinghouse	October 9, 1960 (#66000017)	Providence; 41°49′31″N 71°24′33″W	Providence	Oldest Baptist congregation in the United States, founded by Roger Williams in 1638. The current building dates to 1775.
17	Fleur-de-lys Studios	Fleur-de-lys Studios	October 5, 1992 (#92001886)	Providence; 41°49′39″N 71°24′32″W	Providence	Collaboration by Sydney Richmond Burleigh and Edmund Willson is a key early work by American Arts and Crafts Movement.
18	Flying Horse Carousel	Flying Horse Carousel	February 27, 1987 (#80000019)	Watch Hill; 41°18′25″N 71°51′31″W	Washington	One of the earliest American carousels still in operation, dating to 1876. The horses are suspended from chains, giving it its name.
19^{†}	Fort Adams	Fort Adams	December 8, 1976 (#70000014)	Newport; 41°28′30″N 71°20′28″W	Newport	Site of fortifications since 1799, most of the extant facilities date to the mid-19th century. Fort Adams was the principal defense site for Narragansett Bay.
20	Gen. Nathanael Greene Homestead	Gen. Nathanael Greene Homestead	November 28, 1972 (#71000014)	Coventry; 41°41′42″N 71°32′43″W	Kent	Homestead of American Revolutionary War general Nathanael Greene
21	John N. A. Griswold House	John N. A. Griswold House	May 16, 2000 (#71000023)	Newport; 41°29′09″N 71°18′32″W	Newport	An early work of architect Richard Morris Hunt, this Stick style house was built in 1864 for China merchant John Griswold.
22	Gov. Stephen Hopkins House	Gov. Stephen Hopkins House	November 11, 1971 (#70000022)	Providence; 41°49′30″N 71°24′26″W	Providence	Home of Stephen Hopkins, colonial and state governor, signer of the United States Declaration of Independence
23	Hunter House	Hunter House	November 24, 1968 (#68000003)	Newport; 41°29′36″N 71°19′15″W	Newport	Its oldest parts dating to 1748, this house is an excellent example of Georgian frame house, with many interior features and original furnishings.
24	Thomas P. Ives House	Thomas P. Ives House	December 30, 1970 (#70000023)	Providence; 41°49′22″N 71°24′08″W	Providence	An Adamesque-Federal style house, built in the early 1800s.
25	Edward King House	Edward King House	December 30, 1970 (#70000024)	Newport; 41°28′49″N 71°18′41″W	Newport	This Richard Upjohn-designed Italian villa house was built for a local merchant and was the largest in the city at time of its 1847 completion.
26	Kingscote	Kingscote	June 19, 1996 (#73000058)	Newport; 41°28′30″N 71°18′27″W	Newport	1839 Gothic Revival house by Richard Upjohn was the first summer residence in Newport.
27	Governor Henry Lippitt House	Governor Henry Lippitt House	May 11, 1976 (#72000043)	Providence; 41°49′41″N 71°23′50″W	Providence	This well-preserved 1865 Italianate villa-style house was built for Governor Henry Lippitt. It is now a house museum, with original interior furnishings by architect Henry Childs.
28	Marble House	Marble House	February 17, 2006 (#71000025)	Newport; 41°27′43″N 71°18′20″W	Newport	Designed by Richard Morris Hunt for William Kissam Vanderbilt, this was one of the earliest Beaux Arts houses in the U.S.; it helped begin the trend of building mansions in Newport.
29	Newport Casino	Newport Casino	February 27, 1987 (#70000083)	Newport; 41°28′56″N 71°18′30″W	Newport	Early McKim, Mead and White shingle-style building; also one of the first social clubs to include recreational facilities. Home to International Tennis Hall of Fame.
30^{†}	Newport Historic District	Newport Historic District	November 24, 1968 (#68000001)	Newport; 41°29′24″N 71°18′49″W	Newport	A well-preserved collection of colonial-era buildings in central Newport.
31	Nightingale-Brown House	Nightingale-Brown House	June 29, 1989 (#89001242)	Providence; 41°49′20″N 71°24′12″W	Providence	One of the most accomplished great Georgian houses in the country; later contributions by Richard Upjohn and grounds by Frederick Law Olmsted
32^{†}	Ocean Drive Historic District	Ocean Drive Historic District	May 11, 1976 (#76000048)	Newport; 41°27′18″N 71°19′57″W	Newport	Long road along southern shore of Newport dotted with later, smaller summer homes and seaside views.
33	Old Slater Mill	Old Slater Mill	November 13, 1966 (#66000001)	Pawtucket; 41°52′32″N 71°22′57″W	Providence	The first commercially viable textile mill in the United States.
34	Old State House	Old State House	October 9, 1960 (#66000014)	Newport; 41°29′27″N 71°18′48″W	Newport	A well-preserved Georgian public building from colonial era, it served as the meeting place of colonial, and later state, legislatures until the 20th century.
35^{†}	Original U.S. Naval War College	Original U.S. Naval War College	January 29, 1964 (#66000876)	Newport; 41°30′17″N 71°19′44″W	Newport	Includes the Naval War College Museum, built in the 1820s as Newport's poorhouse and later donated to the Navy as the first building of the Naval War College, and Luce Hall, the college's first purpose-built building.
36	Redwood Library	Redwood Library	October 9, 1960 (#66000015)	Newport; 41°29′11″N 71°18′32″W	Newport	Founded in 1747, this library is the oldest to still occupy its original facilities.
37	Joseph Reynolds House	Joseph Reynolds House	July 28, 1983 (#72000017)	Bristol; 41°41′00″N 71°16′44″W	Bristol	The oldest known three-story timber frame house in New England, built in 1700, it was used as headquarters by Lafayette during the Rhode Island campaign in 1778.
38	William Watts Sherman House	William Watts Sherman House	December 30, 1970 (#70000015)	Newport; 41°28′12″N 71°18′24″W	Newport	This house was built for banker William Watts Sherman by H. H. Richardson in 1875, and is recognized as a prototype of the Shingle style of architecture.
39	Site of Battle of Rhode Island	Site of Battle of Rhode Island	May 30, 1974 (#74002054)	Portsmouth; 41°35′46″N 71°15′47″W	Newport	Site of the 1778 Battle of Rhode Island, a successful defense of Aquidneck Island by British forces in the American Revolutionary War.
40	Gilbert Stuart Birthplace	Gilbert Stuart Birthplace	December 21, 1965 (#66000004)	Saunderstown; 41°31′30″N 71°26′44″W	Washington	Birthplace of noted portraitist Gilbert Stuart.
41	Trinity Church	Trinity Church	November 24, 1968 (#68000004)	Newport; 41°29′15″N 71°18′46″W	Newport	Oldest parish church in Rhode Island; its early 18th-century design is modeled on Boston's Old North Church.
42	United Congregational Church	United Congregational Church	October 16, 2012 (#71000027)	Newport; 41°29′09″N 71°18′45″W	Newport	
43	University Hall, Brown University	University Hall, Brown University	June 13, 1962 (#66000003)	Providence; 41°49′27″N 71°24′16″W	Providence	This first building on the Brown University campus, built in 1770.
44	Vernon House	Vernon House	November 24, 1968 (#68000005)	Newport; 41°29′20″N 71°18′48″W	Newport	Sophisticated Georgian frame home used as headquarters by Rochambeau during the American Revolutionary War.
45	Wanton-Lyman-Hazard House	Wanton-Lyman-Hazard House	October 9, 1960 (#66000016)	Newport; 41°29′28″N 71°18′45″W	Newport	Built circa 1697, this is the oldest house in Newport, illustrating the transition from 17th to 18th-century architectural styles.

== See also ==
- List of National Natural Landmarks in Rhode Island
