= College Hill Historic District (Providence, Rhode Island) =

Historic district in Rhode Island, United States

- U.S. National Register of Historic Places
- U.S. National Historic Landmark District
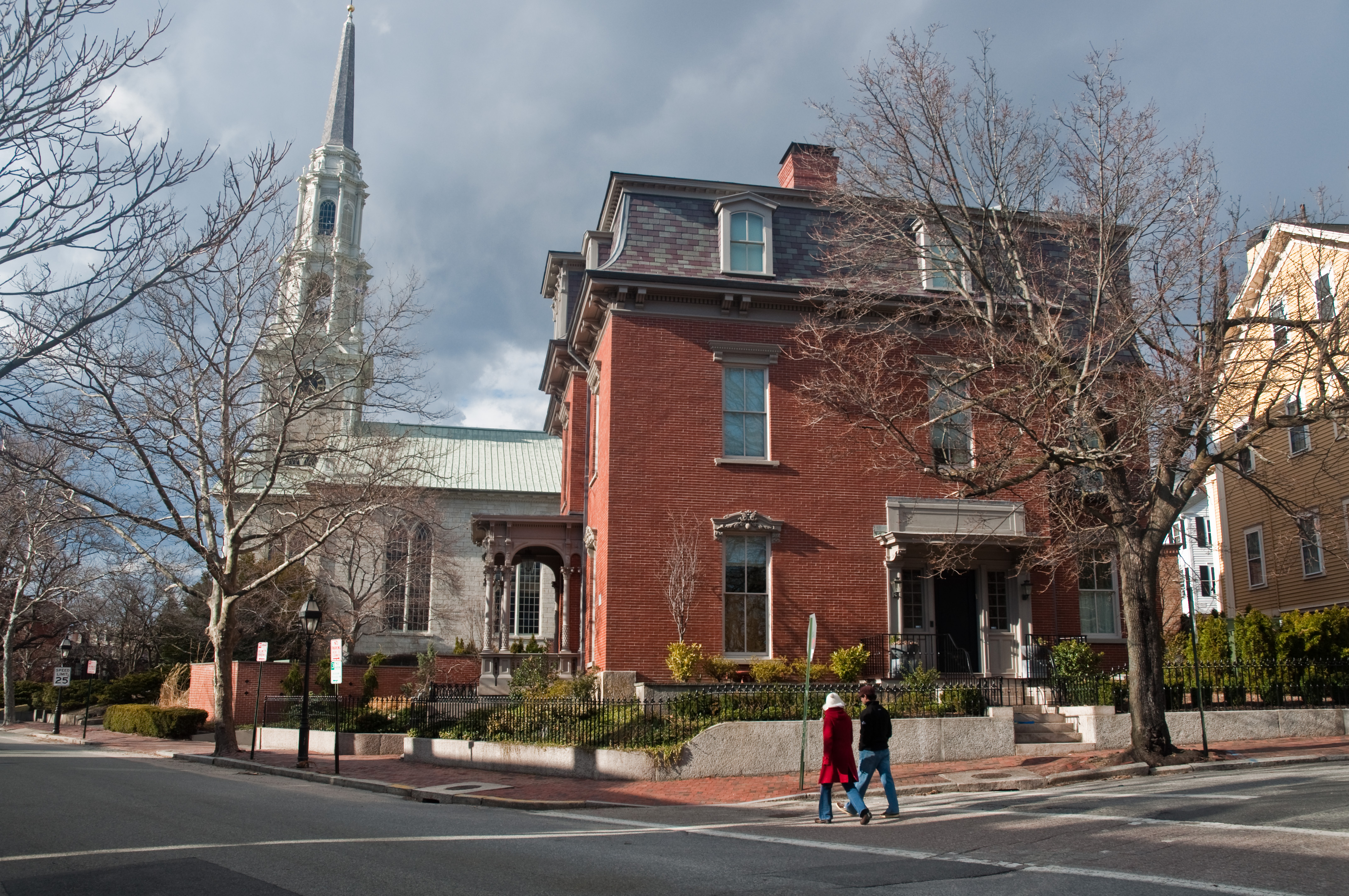
- Benefit Street

- Location within Rhode Island Location within the United States
- Interactive map showing the location for
- Location: Roughly bounded by the Providence and Seekonk Rivers, Olney, Hope, and Governor Sts., Carrington and Whittier, Providence, Rhode Island
- Coordinates: 41°49′35″N 71°24′12″W
- Architect: Multiple
- Architectural style: Mid 19th Century Revival, Federal
- NRHP reference No.: 70000019

Significant dates
- Added to NRHP: November 10, 1970
- Designated NHLD: December 30, 1970

The College Hill Historic District is located in the College Hill neighborhood of Providence, Rhode Island. It was designated a National Historic Landmark District on December 30, 1970. The College Hill local historic district, established in 1960 (and expanded in 1990), partially overlaps the national landmark district. Properties within the local historic district are regulated by the city's historic district zoning ordinance, and cannot be altered without approval from the Providence Historic District Commission.

== History ==
The area marks the original settlement of Roger Williams in 1636 on the banks of the Providence River after he was banished from Massachusetts. Williams' original homestead site is located near Roger Williams National Memorial, a small park near the river. Many of the street names mark the location of the original strips of farmland owned by the earliest settlers, such as Wickenden Street, Arnold Street, and Angell Street. Many Victorian and American colonial houses such as the Stephen Hopkins House remain in the area.

Brown University, Moses Brown School, Wheeler School, and the Rhode Island School of Design are atop the hill, giving it its name. Thayer Street is a popular destination nearby with coffee shops, galleries, stores, and restaurants. Many churches are also in the area including Roger Williams' First Baptist Church in America and Central Congregational Church. The Hill district is transected by Benefit Street which was built as a "benefit" to the community and stretched perpendicularly crossing the original homestead strips. The Old State House and Providence Athenaeum, the fourth oldest library in America are located in the district.

=== Designation ===
The National Historic District was designated in 1960 following a detailed inventory of the area which identified 348 structures in the district as contributing properties. The district was expanded 1977 and 1990 to approximately 945 properties largely from the 18th and 19th centuries.

The effort to establish the district were spearheaded by Antoinette Downing and John Nicholas Brown II.

== See also ==
- College Hill, Providence, Rhode Island, a neighborhood of Providence
- List of National Historic Landmarks in Rhode Island
- National Register of Historic Places listings in Providence, Rhode Island
