= Madeleine Ives Goddard =

American socialite and nurse (1874–1931)

Marquise d'Andigné
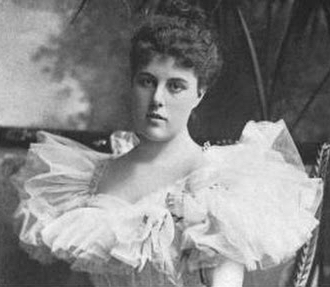
- Goddard, from a 1901 publication
- Born: Madeleine Ives Goddard; July 1, 1874; Providence, Rhode Island, US
- Died: March 31, 1931 (aged 56); Providence, Rhode Island, US
- Spouse: René d'Andigné (m. 1906; died 1929)
- Parent(s): Robert Hale Ives Goddard; Rebecca Groesbeck Goddard
- Relatives: William S. Groesbeck (grandfather)

Madeleine Ives Goddard, Marquise d'Andigné (July 1, 1874 – March 31, 1931) was an American socialite and nurse, who became the Marquise d'Andigné upon her marriage in 1906. In France, she continued her interest in nursing, and was decorated for her contributions during World War I.

== Early life ==
Madeleine Ives Goddard was born in Providence, Rhode Island, on July 1, 1874. She was one of three children born to Robert Hale Ives Goddard and Rebecca Burnet (née Groesbeck) Goddard, a native of Cincinnati, Ohio. Her father was a banker and industrialist, and a veteran of the Union Army in the American Civil War. Her older brother, William Groesbeck Goddard, died young, and her younger brother, Robert Hale Ives Goddard Jr., married Margaret Hazard (granddaughter of Rowland G. Hazard) and was involved with Brown & Ives, the family investment firm.

Her paternal grandparents were Charlotte Rhoda (née Ives) Goddard (daughter of Thomas P. Ives) and William Giles Goddard, a Brown University alumni and professor who owned and published the Rhode Island American newspaper. Her cousin was yachtswoman Hope Goddard Iselin. Her maternal grandparents were Elizabeth (née Burnet) Groesbeck (daughter of Judge Jacob Burnet) and William S. Groesbeck, a member of the U.S. House of Representatives from Cincinnati.

Although she was "one of the richest of the American heiresses", she was "not fond of society or social functions"; instead, she studied violin, enjoyed sports, and trained as a nurse.

== Philanthropy ==
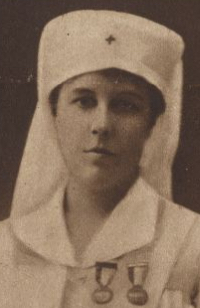
Madeleine, Marquise d'Andigné, from a 1916 newspaper, dressed in a nurse's uniform, with two medals pinned to chest.

In France, the Marquise d'Andigné used her nursing training to volunteer during World War I. With several other American women in Paris, including Elizabeth Beers-Curtis and Mary Alsop King Waddington, she co-founded and was president of Le Bien-être du Blessé, a national organization of volunteers, purchasing and delivering supplies to hospitals near the front, and building and staffing hospital kitchens. Her wealthy contacts in the United States helped to raise funds, especially the organization's American president, writer Gertrude Atherton. Cooperation with the American Red Cross added useful expertise. Madame d'Andigné was decorated for heroism, and received the Legion d'Honneur for her wartime service.

In 1927, with her brother, she gave Rhode Island Goddard Memorial State Park, a 472-acre (191 ha) state park along the shores of Greenwich Cove and Greenwich Bay in Warwick, Rhode Island, in memory of their father.

== Personal life ==
Goddard turned away several notable suitors until 1905, when she met René d'Andigné, the Marquis d'Andigné, while motoring in France. René was the son of General the Marquis d'Andigné, a cavalry commander in the Franco-Prussian War who became one of the political leaders of France. They married on December 29, 1906 at Hopeton House, her family's home in Providence.

Her husband died in 1929. She died from cancer in 1931, aged 56 years, at her brother's home in Providence, Rhode Island. In her will, she left $100,000 to the Rhode Island Foundation, "for the relief of incurables." The Marquise d'Andigné Fund continues into the 21st century, supporting people with Alzheimer's disease, cancer, and other diagnoses in Rhode Island.
