= Moses Brown Ives =

American businessman and philanthropist

- Born: July 21, 1794; Providence, Rhode Island, U.S.
- Died: August 7, 1857 (aged 63); Providence, Rhode Island, U.S.
- Education: Brown University
- Occupations: Merchant, banker
- Spouse: Annie Allen Dorr (m. 1833)
- Children: 2
- Parent(s): Thomas Poynton Ives; Hope Brown Ives
- Relatives: Nicholas Brown III (cousin); John Carter Brown II (cousin); Nicholas Brown (grandfather); Nicholas Brown Jr. (uncle)

Moses Brown Ives (July 21, 1794 – August 7, 1857) was a businessman and philanthropist from Providence, Rhode Island who was partner in Brown & Ives and President of Providence Bank. He also served as a trustee of Brown University, and was treasurer of Butler Hospital.

== Early life ==
Moses Brown Ives was born in Providence, Rhode Island on July 21, 1794, and named after Moses Brown, the co-founder of Brown University. He was the eldest son of Thomas Poynton Ives (1769–1835) and Hope (née Brown) Ives (1773–1855). Among his siblings was older sister Charlotte Rhoda Ives, who married Professor William Giles Goddard (parents of Robert Hale Ives Goddard); and Robert Hale Ives Jr., who married Harriet Bowen Amory.

His paternal grandparents were Sarah (née Bray) Ives and Captain Robert Hale Ives, a master-mariner who was one of the original eighteen members of the Salem Marine Society. His maternal grandparents were Nicholas Brown Sr. and his first wife, Rhoda (née Jenckes) Brown. His maternal uncle was Nicholas Brown Jr. and among his first cousins eres Nicholas Brown III and John Carter Brown II.

Ives graduated from Brown University in 1812 and then attended Litchfield Law School before traveling abroad in Europe.

== Career ==
He followed his father and became a partner in Brown & Ives in 1832, president of Providence Bank, and trustee of Brown University. In addition, he served as treasurer of Butler Hospital.

== Personal life ==
Coat of Arms of Moses Brown Ives

In 1833, Ives was married to Annie Allen Dorr (1810–1884). Annie, the daughter of Sullivan Dorr, a prosperous manufacturer and co-owner of Bernon Mill Village, was the sister of Thomas Wilson Dorr, the extralegal Governor of Rhode Island. Together, they were the parents of two children:

- Thomas Poynton Ives (1834–1865), a Captain during the U.S. Civil War who married Elizabeth Cabot Motley, daughter of U.S. Minister to the United Kingdom John Lothrop Motley. After his death, his widow, who inherited his fortune, remarried to British statesman Sir William Harcourt and became the mother of MP Robert Harcourt.
- Hope Brown Ives (1839–1909), who married Henry Grinnell Russell, one of the wealthiest men in Rhode Island.

His desk-and-bookcase were made in Providence, Rhode Island at the end of the 18th Century. It was made in the Chippendale style, and mahogany is its primary wood.

Ives died on August 7, 1857, and was buried in Providence's North Burial Ground. Upon his death, he created a bequest which was used to provide some of the early funding for the creation of Rhode Island Hospital in 1863.
