= Thomas Poynton Ives =

American merchant and banker

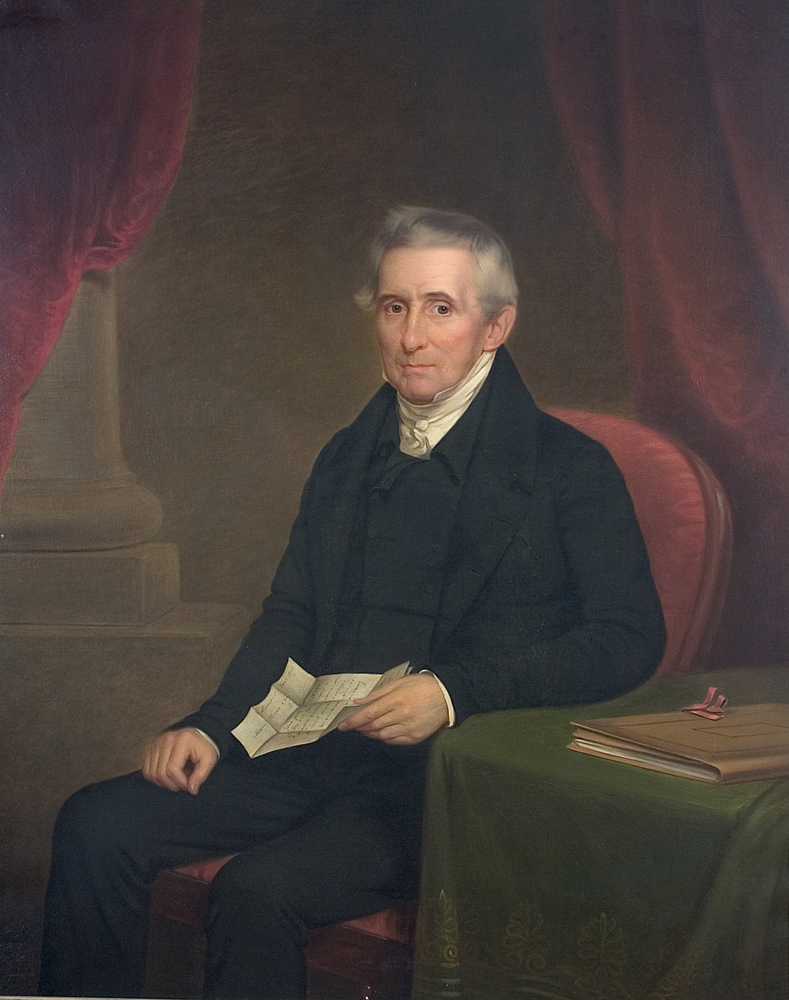
- Ives, painted by James Sullivan Lincoln
- Born: April 9, 1769; Beverly, Massachusetts Bay Colony
- Died: April 30, 1835 (aged 66); Providence, Rhode Island
- Spouse: Hope Brown (m. 1792)
- Children: 6, including Moses Brown Ives
- Parent(s): Robert Hale Ives; Sarah Ives
- Relatives: Robert H. I. Goddard (grandson)

Thomas Poynton Ives (April 9, 1769 – April 30, 1835) was an American merchant and banker from Rhode Island.

== Early life ==
Ives was born on April 9, 1769, in Beverly in the Massachusetts Bay Colony in what was then British America, and was baptized on June 4, 1769. He was the son of Sarah (née Bray) Ives and Captain Robert Hale Ives, a master-mariner who was one of the original eighteen members of the Salem Marine Society.

When Ives was just four years old, his father died. Ives was raised by relatives in Boston who sent him to public school.

== Career ==
At the age of thirteen, Ives began as a clerk for Nicholas Brown Sr. in his mercantile trade firm of Brown & Benson. After Brown's death in 1791, Ives went into partnership with Brown's son, Nicholas Brown II, founding the firm of Brown & Ives.

Ives also served as president of Providence Bank for twenty-four years and president of the Providence Institution for Savings for fifteen years. He also served as a trustee of Brown University, named in honor of his wife's family, for forty-three years, and in 1829, he presented the college with a philosophical apparatus.

== Personal life ==
On March 5, 1792, Ives was married to Hope Brown (1773–1855), the sister of his partner in Brown & Ives and the only surviving daughter of Nicholas Brown Sr. and his first wife, Rhoda (née Jenckes) Brown. Together, they were the parents of:

- Charlotte Rhoda Ives (1792–1881), who married Professor William Giles Goddard in 1821.
- Moses Brown Ives (1794–1857), who married Annie Allen Dorr (sister of Thomas Wilson Dorr) in 1833.
- Elizabeth Ives (1796–1813), who died unmarried at age 16.
- Robert Hale Ives Sr. (1798–1875), who married Harriet Bowen Amory in 1827 and helped establish both the Butler Hospital and Rhode Island Hospital.
- Hope Brown Ives (1802–1837), who died unmarried at age 34.
- Thomas Poynton Ives Jr. (1804–1804), who died in infancy.

Ives died on April 30, 1835, in Providence, Rhode Island.

=== Descendants ===
Coat of Arms of Thomas Poynton Ives

Through his eldest daughter, he was the grandfather of banker, industrialist, U.S. Army officer, state senator and philanthropist Robert Hale Ives Goddard.

Through his son Moses, he was the grandfather of U.S. Civil War Captain Thomas Poynton Ives (1834–1865) and Hope Brown Ives (1839–1909), who married Henry Grinnell Russell, one of the wealthiest men in Rhode Island. Shortly before his early death while at Le Havre, France, his grandson married Elizabeth Cabot Motley, daughter of U.S. Minister to the United Kingdom John Lothrop Motley. After his death, his widow, who inherited his fortune, remarried to British statesman Sir William Harcourt and became the mother of MP Robert Harcourt.

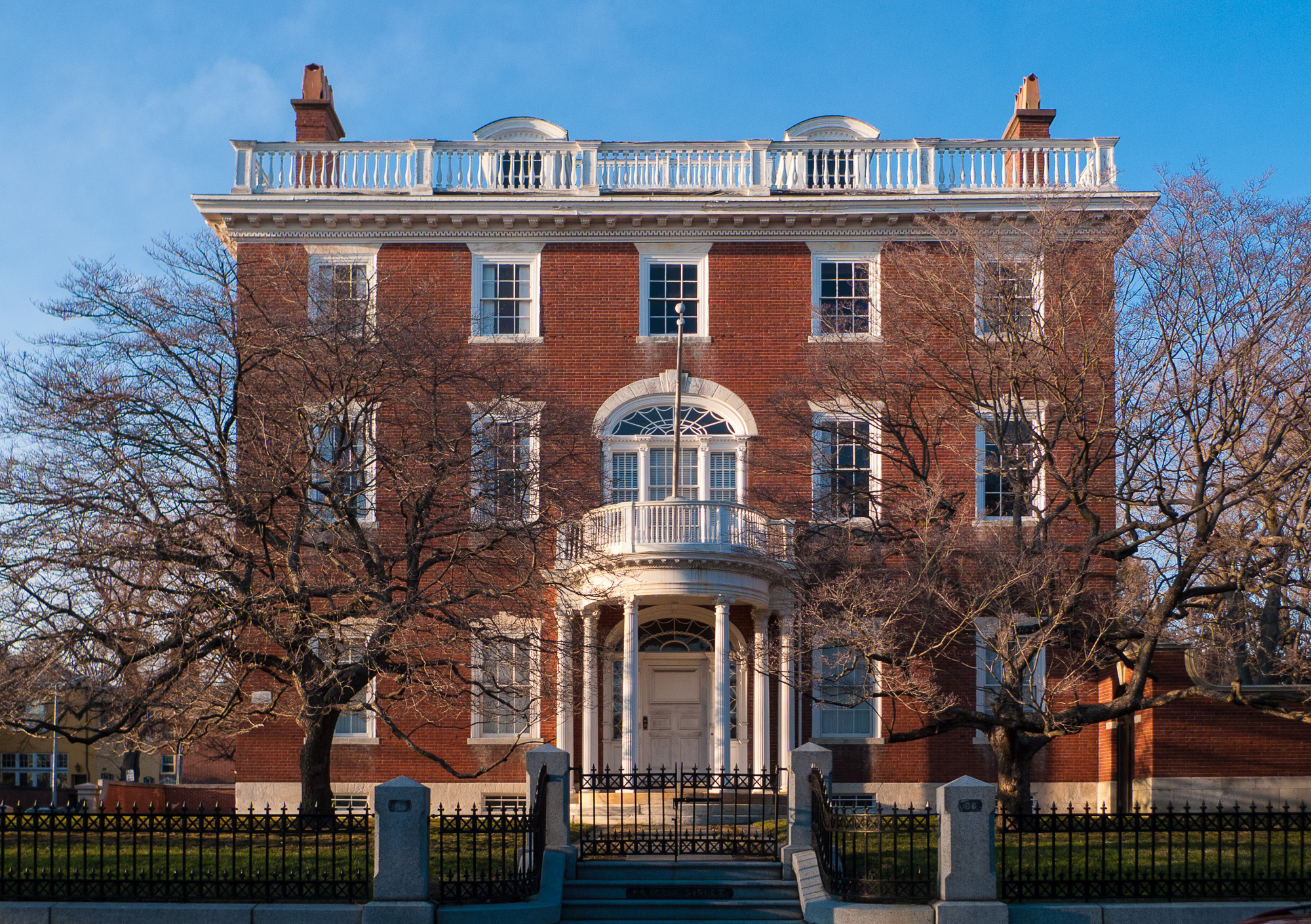
Thomas P. Ives House in 2011

=== Residence ===
Between 1803 and 1806, Ives hired Caleb Ormsbee to build him a family home at 66 Power Street in the College Hill in Providence, Rhode Island. The 3-1/2 story brick house, remained in the hands of the Ives family until 1910. At that time it was sold to Brown University, retaining a lifetime occupancy right for owners. In 1970, the residence was designated a National Historic Landmark.

Ives' desk-and-bookcase is currently in a private collection. It was made by the cabinetmaker James Halyburton in Providence.

== Awards and honors ==
Ives was awarded an honorary degree from Brown University in 1864.
