= Thomas P. Ives House =

Historic house in Rhode Island, United States

- U.S. National Register of Historic Places
- U.S. National Historic Landmark
- U.S. National Historic Landmark District – Contributing property
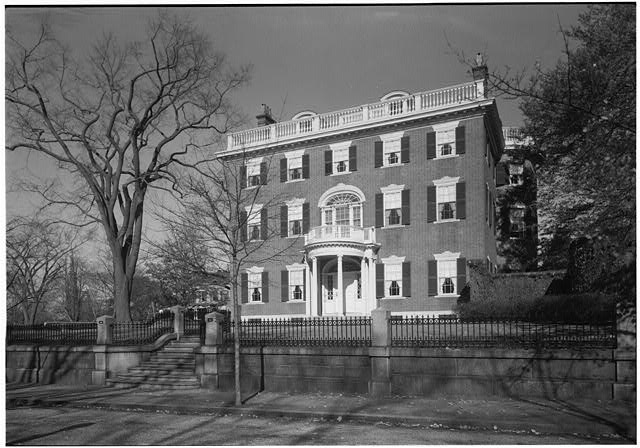
- Thomas P. Ives House

- Location within Rhode Island Location within the United States
- Location: 66 Power St., Providence, Rhode Island
- Coordinates: 41°49′24″N 71°24′10″W
- Built: 1803–1806
- Architect: Caleb Ormsbee
- Architectural style: Federal, Adamesque, American Federal
- Part of: College Hill Historic District (ID70000019)
- NRHP reference No.: 70000023

Significant dates
- Added to NRHP: December 30, 1970
- Designated NHL: December 30, 1970
- Designated NHLDCP: November 10, 1970

The Thomas P. Ives House is a National Historic Landmark at 66 Power Street in the College Hill in Providence, Rhode Island. Built in 1803–06, this brick house is an extremely well-preserved and little-altered example of Adamesque-Federal style. The house was built by Caleb Ormsbee, a Providence master builder, for Thomas Poynton Ives, a wealthy merchant. Although two of its principal chambers were redecorated in the 1870s, these alterations were reversed in the 1950s. The house was in Ives family hands for more than 150 years. It was designated a National Historic Landmark on December 30, 1970.

== Description ==
The Ives House is a 3 1/2-story brick structure, with a hip roof surrounded by a low balustrade. The front facade and sides are laid in Flemish bond, while the back wall is laid in American bond. The front is five bays wide, with a single-story circular porch (an 1884 addition) sheltering the centered entry. The doorway is flanked by sidelight windows and topped by an elliptical fanlight. On the right side of the house is a projecting bay, which originally was a single story but now rises the full three stories. The main roof cornice is modillioned.

The first floor of the interior is a grand and imposing presence. The central hallway is ten feet wide, with rooms on either side and a stairway that spirals upward. The main parlor is to the right, with an oval library in the center, and a smoking room at the back. On the left is the dining room, with a pantry and kitchen behind. The public rooms are decorated in delicate Adamesque woodwork, with the parlor and dining room also featuring particularly elaborate plaster decoration.

== History ==
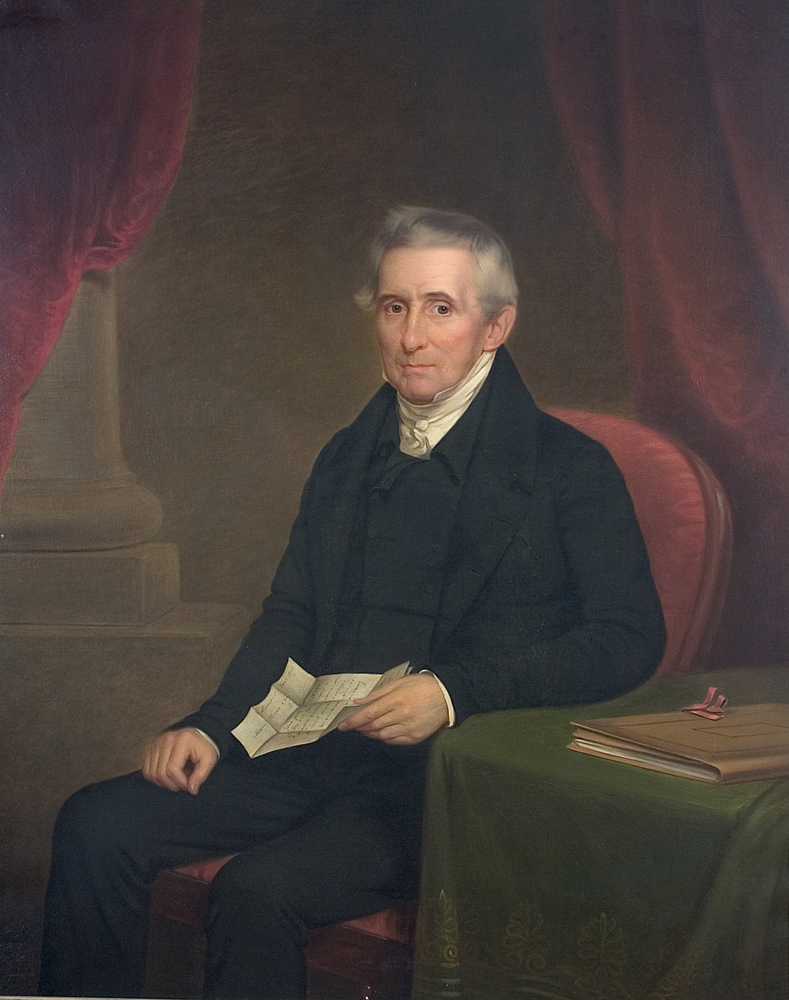
Thomas Poynton Ives, painted by James Sullivan Lincoln

Thomas Poynton Ives (1759–1835) was a wealthy merchant, who received his training in the counting house of Nicholas Brown Sr., married Brown's daughter Hope, and in 1796 formed the partnership of Brown & Ives with Nicholas Brown Jr., for whom Brown University is named. Ives hired Caleb Ormsbee to build this house, which was built between 1803 and 1806. The house remained in the hands of the Ives family until 1910. At that time it was sold to Brown University, retaining a lifetime occupancy right for owners.

The house underwent a number of relatively modest alterations. Gas lighting and central heat were added in 1848, and French doors were added to the library in 1910. The most significant ones occurred in the 1870s, when the dining room and library were redecorated in the Colonial Revival style. This work was removed in 1954, replaced by Federal styling more in keeping with the rest of the house. A period fireplace mantel from Philadelphia was installed in the dining room as part of this work.

The house was designated a National Historic Landmark and listed on the National Register of Historic Places in 1970; it was included as a contributing property to the expansive College Hill Historic District, a National Historic Landmark District encompassing the original colonial center of Providence.

== Gallery ==
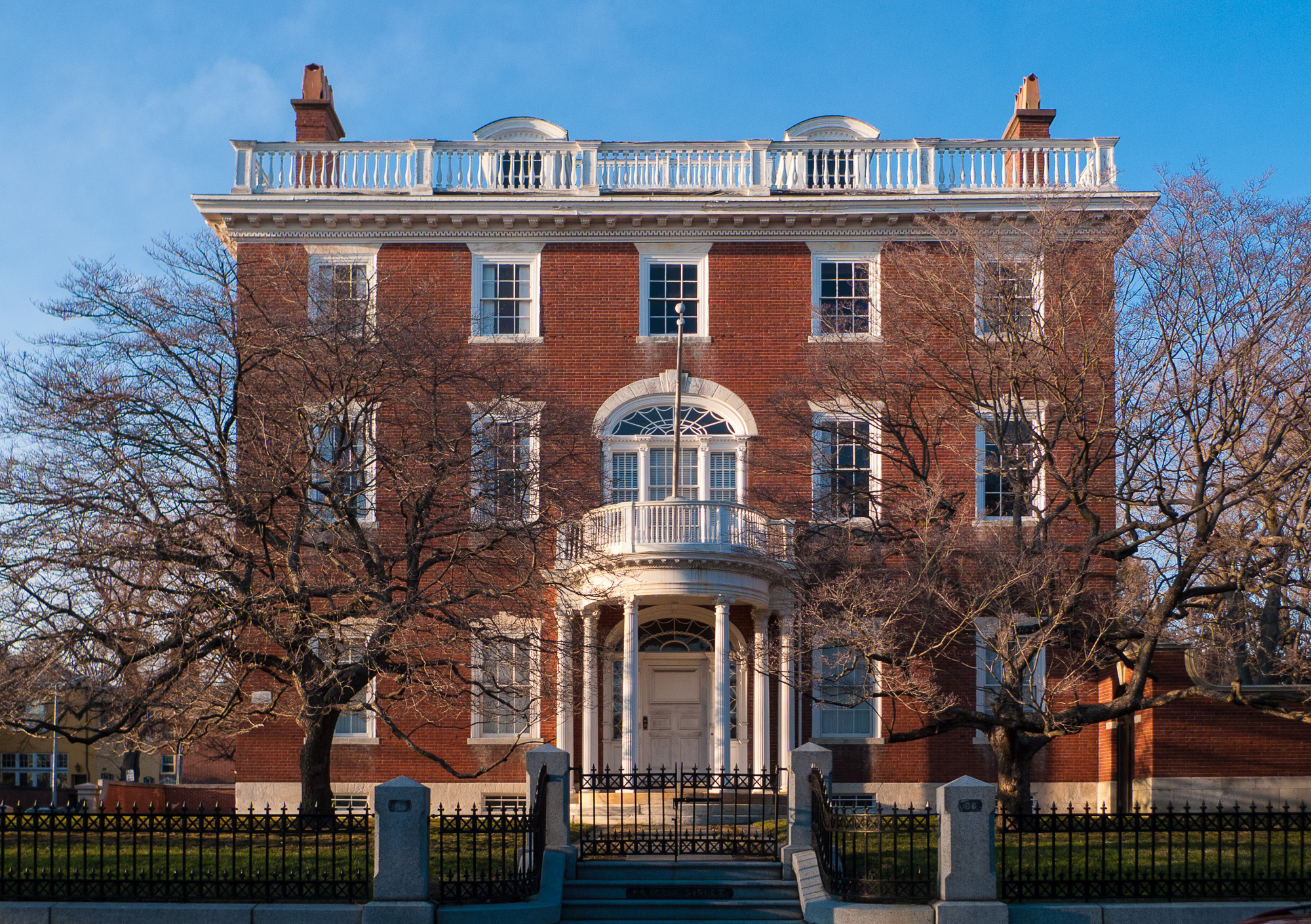
Winter 2011

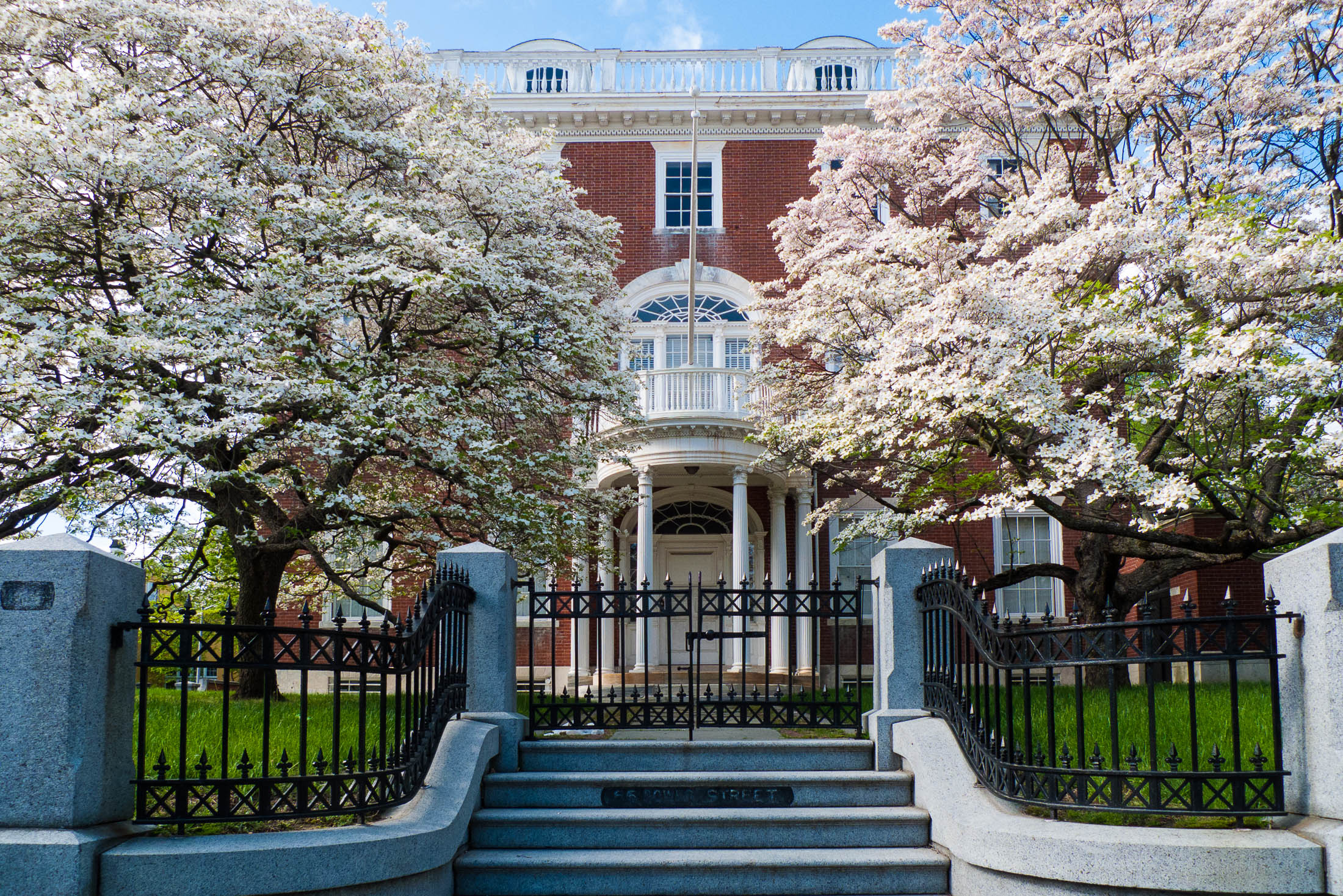
Spring 2011

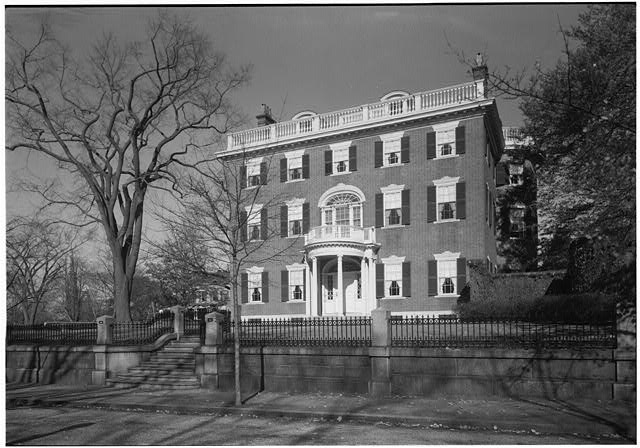
House in 1937

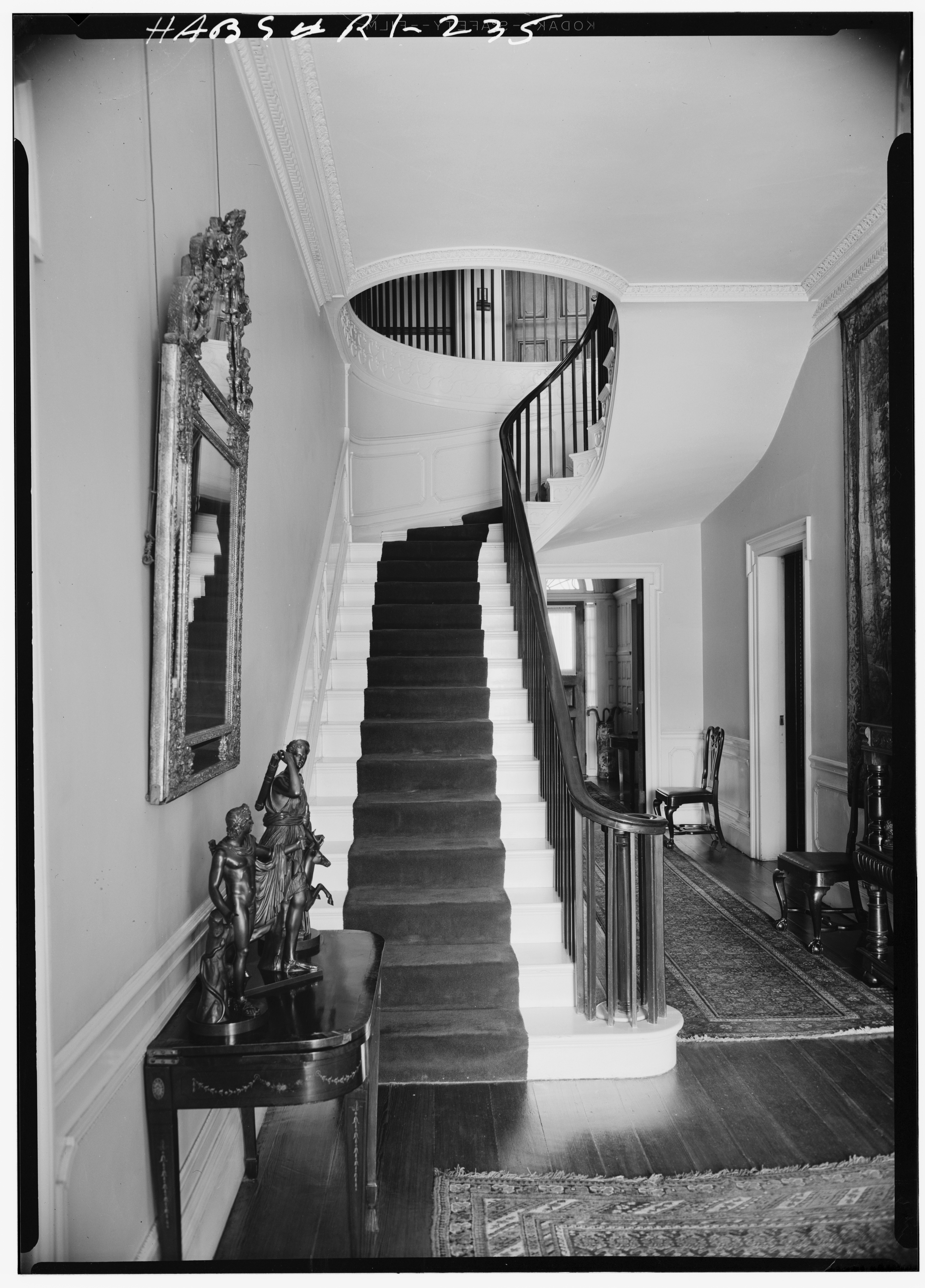
Main Stairway at the first floor in 1958

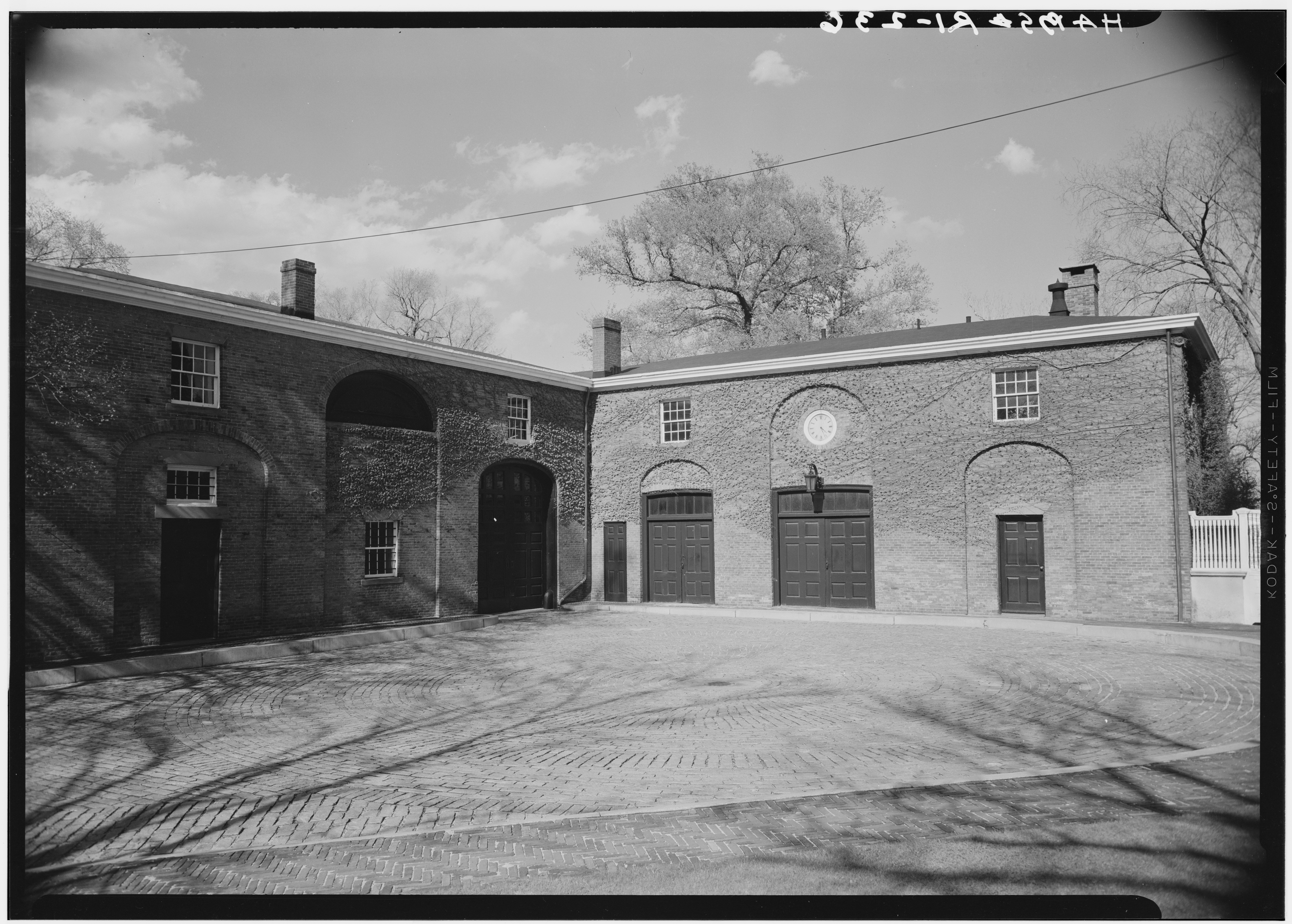
Stable and Coach houses, 1958

== See also ==
- List of National Historic Landmarks in Rhode Island
- National Register of Historic Places listings in Providence, Rhode Island
