= Alexander Long =

American politician (1816–1886)

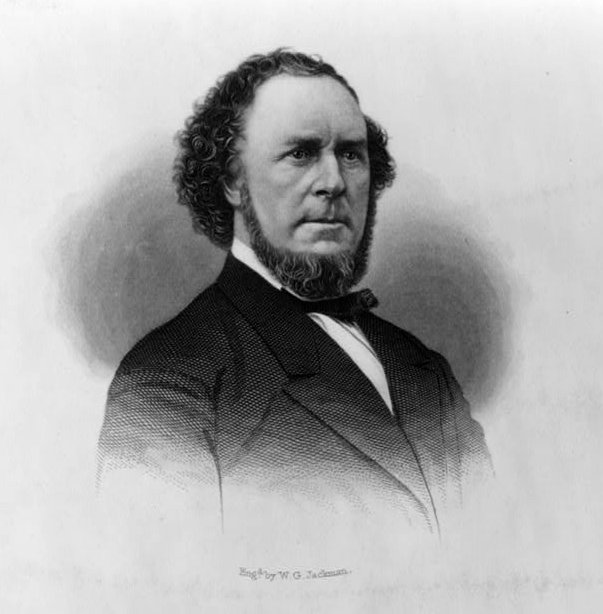

Member of the U.S. House of Representatives from Ohio's 2nd district
- In office March 4, 1863 – March 3, 1865
- Preceded by: John A. Gurley
- Succeeded by: Rutherford B. Hayes

Member of the Ohio House of Representatives from the Hamilton County district
- In office December 4, 1846 – December 1, 1850
- Preceded by: Multi-member district
- Succeeded by: Multi-member district

Personal details
- Born: December 24, 1816 Greenville, Pennsylvania, U.S.
- Died: November 28, 1886 (aged 69) Cincinnati, Ohio, U.S.
- Resting place: Spring Grove Cemetery
- Party: Democratic
- Spouse: Cynthia Parker Sammons

Alexander Long (December 24, 1816 – November 28, 1886) was an American politician who served as the Representative from Ohio's 2nd congressional district from March 4, 1863 to March 3, 1865. He was a member of the Democratic Party.

During the Civil War, Long was a prominent "Copperhead", a member of the peace movement of the Democratic Party, and he was identified as being one of the war's most vehement opponents. Even though Long was a "free-soiler" Democrat who in his early years voted to repeal the "Black Laws of Ohio", he later opposed both emancipation and suffrage for blacks.

== Early life ==
Alexander Long was born in the north, in Greenville, Pennsylvania, on December 24, 1816. In 1838 at age twenty-one, Long moved from Pennsylvania to Cincinnati, Ohio and then to rural Hamilton County, Ohio. After working several months as a farm hand, Long decided to enhance his rudimentary education at a nearby academy. After graduating, Long became a teacher in the rural schools of Green township, Hamilton County, where he taught for eight years between 1840 and 1848. While working as a teacher in 1842, Long began studying law under Thomas J. Gallagher. On October 27, 1842, Long married Cynthia Parker Sammons (1823–1900).

In March 1845 Long was admitted to the bar by the Ohio Supreme Court then in session at Portsmouth, Scioto County, Ohio. Long entered politics in 1848 after turning down two previous nominations in 1846 and 1847.

=== Ohio legislature ===
While serving in the Ohio legislature, Long became an associate of Salmon P. Chase, and helped steer the Ohio legislature towards electing Chase as the United States Senator from Ohio in 1848. Long also continued to teach when the legislature was not in session.

After serving two years as a "free-soiler" Democrat in the Ohio State House of Representatives (1848–1850), Long moved to Cincinnati, where he began an active and lucrative law practice in January, 1851. A staunch Democrat, Long supported the compromiser James Buchanan on the eve of the war in 1856.

== Civil War years ==
In 1862, Long ran for Congress and was elected as an anti-war Democrat from the Second District of Ohio, and he served in the U.S. House of Representatives as a member of the 38th Congress from March 4, 1863, until March 3, 1865.

Long is best known for his opposition to the Civil War and being in favor of independence for the Confederacy on the basis of "states' rights". By 1864, Long's arguments on the institution of slavery had changed since his "free-soiler" days, and he argued against President Abraham Lincoln's Emancipation Proclamation because Long believed the proclamation only served to harden the resolve of Southerners as they continued to resist and prolong the war. In a speech he made in Congress on April 8, 1864, Long expressed his anti-war views, and he championed the "states' rights" arguments proffered by Vice President Thomas Jefferson and James Madison in their The Kentucky and Virginia Resolutions of 1798.

I believe now that there are but two alternatives, and these are, either an acknowledgment of the independence of the South as an independent nation, or their complete subjugation and extermination as a people, and of these alternatives I prefer the former... I do not believe there can be any prosecution of the war against a sovereign State under the Constitution, and I do not believe that a war so carried on can be prosecuted so as to render it proper, justifiable, or expedient. An unconstitutional war can only be carried on in an unconstitutional manner, and to prosecute it further under the idea of the gentleman from Pennsylvania [Mr. Stevens], as a war waged against the Confederate States as an independent nation, for the purpose of conquest and subjugation, as he proposes, and the Administration is in truth and in fact doing, I am equally opposed.

Long's April 8 speech firmly cemented his opprobrious label of "Copperhead"; thereafter, Long was seen as one of the chief leaders of that group: the "peace wing of the Democratic Party." Long's speech was immediately and roundly denounced by several congressmen including Speaker of the House Schuyler Colfax who wanted to expel Long from the House. Speaker Colfax could not muster the votes to expel Long, so on April 9, 1864, Long was censured by Congress for "treasonable utterances" by a vote of 80 to 69.

The pro-peace Democrats sought to nominate Long as a candidate for president in 1864, but he declined the candidacy. Long refused to back either President Abraham Lincoln or the Democratic candidate for president, General George B. McClellan, in the 1864 election, refusing to vote for a presidential candidate in 1864 just as he had refused to vote for a presidential candidate in 1860. Long continued to reject all presidential candidates until 1876 because they had all supported the war. He also made an unsuccessful bid for reelection to the 39th Congress in 1864.

== Postwar years ==
After his failed run for the House in 1864, Long was nominated by the "states' rights" faction of the Ohio Democratic Party to make a run for governor of Ohio. Long ran against fellow Democratic candidate General George W. Morgan and "Unionist" (Republican) Jacob D. Cox. Long, with only 360 votes, was soundly defeated by Cox. Without political office, Long resumed his successful law practice in Cincinnati. Nevertheless, Long remained active in politics and served as a delegate, or in other capacities, to the Democratic National Conventions in 1864, 1868, 1872, and 1876.

In 1868, Long worked diligently to reorganize the Democratic Party, and he sought out Salmon P. Chase to be the Democratic nominee for president. Chase accepted. One issue that helped Long settle on Chase as a candidate was that both men were "hard money" men; hence, both men opposed further reliance on the "Greenback" policy that had funded the Union's war effort. Further, both men were against continuing the military governance—deemed "military despotism" by Long—of the South, and both men regarded suffrage as a "states' rights" issue. Both men could champion the principle of universal suffrage sought by Northerners while acquiescing to the very real possibility that the South would continue to disenfranchise blacks with state laws. Long was one of Chase's men working behind the scenes at the 1868 Democratic National Convention. Political maneuvering during the convention left Chase and his men out in the cold, and the Democratic nomination went to the chairman of the convention, who was also the governor of New York: Horatio Seymour.

=== Death and burial ===
Long died on November 28, 1886, and he is interred in Spring Grove Cemetery in Cincinnati.

== See also ==
- List of United States representatives expelled, censured, or reprimanded

== Notes ==
=== References ===
- Harlan, Louis R. (1961). "The Autobiography of Alexander Long". Bulletin of the Historical and Philosophical Society of Ohio. 19: 99–127.
- Hubbell, John T.; Geary, James W., eds. (1995). Biographical Dictionary of the Union: Northern Leaders of the Civil War. Westport, CT: Greenwood Press. p. 315.
- Klement, Frank L. (1977). "Sound and fury: Civil War dissent in the Cincinnati area" (PDF). Cincinnati Historical Society Bulletin. 35: 98–114. Archived from the original (PDF) on June 16, 2013.
- Long, Alexander (1864). The present condition and future prospects of the country: speech of Hon. Alexander Long, of Ohio, delivered in the House of Representatives, April 8, 1864.
- Perzel, Edward S. (1965). "Alexander Long, Salmon P. Chase, and The Election of 1868". Bulletin of the Historical and Philosophical Society of Ohio. 23: 2–18.
- Porter, George H. (1911). Ohio Politics During the Civil War Period. New York, NY: Columbia University Press.

U.S. House of Representatives
Preceded by John A. Gurley	Member of the U.S. House of Representatives from Ohio's 2nd congressional district 1863–1865	Succeeded by Rutherford B. Hayes
