= John A. Gurley =

American politician (1813–1863)

John Addison Gurley
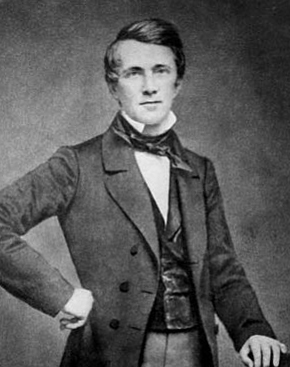

Member of the U.S. House of Representatives from Ohio's 2nd district
- In office March 4, 1859 – March 3, 1863
- Preceded by: William S. Groesbeck
- Succeeded by: Alexander Long

Personal details
- Born: December 9, 1813 East Hartford, Connecticut
- Died: August 19, 1863 (aged 49) Green Township, Ohio
- Resting place: Spring Grove Cemetery
- Party: Republican

John Addison Gurley (December 9, 1813 – August 19, 1863) was an American politician who served as a U.S. Congressman from Ohio during the early part of the American Civil War, serving two terms from 1859 to 1863. He was appointed as the first Governor of the Arizona Territory, but died before taking office.

== Biography ==
Gurley was born in East Hartford, Connecticut. He attended the district schools and received academic instruction before becoming an apprentice in the hatter’s trade. He studied theology and became a minister, serving as pastor of the Universalist Church in Methuen, Massachusetts, from 1835–1838. He moved west to Cincinnati, Ohio, in 1838 and became owner and editor of the Star and Sentinel, later called the Star in the West, and also served as a pastor in that city. Gurley retired from the ministry in 1850, sold his newspaper in 1854 and retired to his farm near Cincinnati.

He was the unsuccessful Republican candidate for election in 1856 to the Thirty-fifth United States Congress. However, he was elected to the Thirty-sixth and Thirty-seventh Congresses (March 4, 1859–March 3, 1863). Gurley was an unsuccessful candidate for reelection in 1862 to the Thirty-eighth Congress.

During the Civil War, Gurley served as colonel and aide-de-camp on the staff of Gen. John C. Frémont in 1861 when Congress was not in session. In 1863, Gurley was appointed Governor of the Arizona Territory by President Abraham Lincoln, but he died of a sudden attack of appendicitis in Green Township, near Cincinnati, on the eve of his departure to assume his duties. He was buried in Spring Grove Cemetery in Cincinnati. Granite Mountain (Arizona), a prominent feature outside Prescott, Arizona was originally named Mount Gurley in his honor.

Gurley married Sarah Leonora Borden (1823–1900).

U.S. House of Representatives
Preceded by William S. Groesbeck	U.S. Representative from Ohio's 2nd district 1859 – 1863	Succeeded by Alexander Long
