= Hawthorne Hotel =

Historic hotel in Salem, Massachusetts

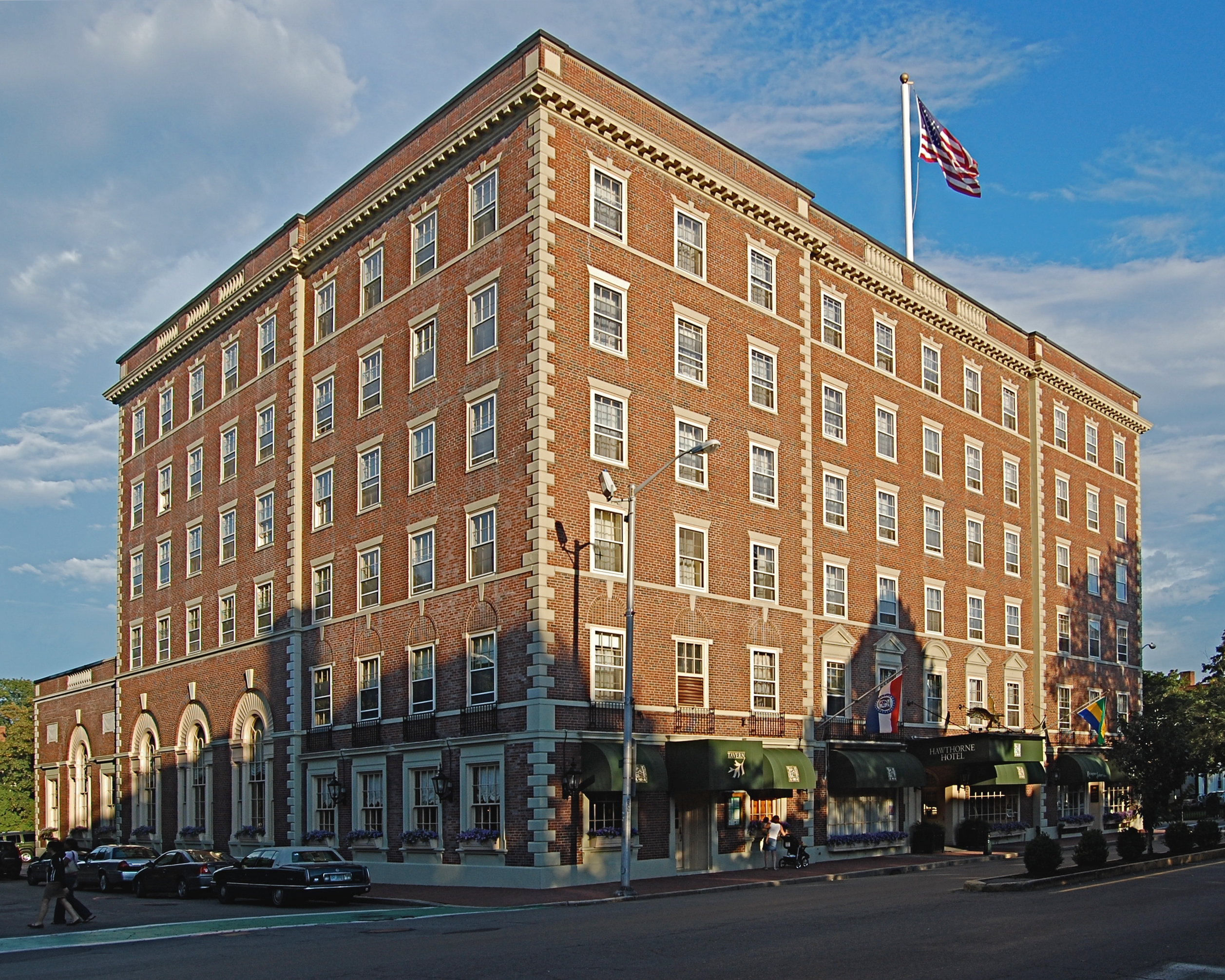
- View of the hotel from Washington Sq. W
- Interactive map of the Hawthorne Hotel area

General information
- Location: 18 Washington Sq. W, Salem, Massachusetts, United States
- Coordinates: 42.5228°N 70.8902°W
- Opened: July 23, 1925

Technical details
- Floor count: 5 (+2)

Design and construction
- Architect: Philip Horton Smith
- Developer: Pitman & Brown Co.

Other information
- Number of rooms: 93
- Number of suites: 10
- Number of restaurants: 2
- Parking: Guest pass/Valet

Website
- www.hawthornehotel.com

The Hawthorne Hotel is a historic hotel located on Washington Square West in Salem, Massachusetts. The hotel is named after novelist and Salem native Nathaniel Hawthorne. Built in 1925, the hotel is currently a member of the Historic Hotels of America, the official program of the National Trust for Historic Preservation. The U.S. News & World Report ranked it the number one hotel in Salem. It has also been listed as one of the top allegedly haunted places in Massachusetts and the country.

== History ==
=== Franklin Building ===
Before the hotel’s construction, the location the hotel sits on used to be the site of the Franklin Building, built in the early 1800s. The building soon became the headquarters of the Salem Marine Society, acquired by sea captain Thomas Handasyd Perkins in 1838. It was damaged by fire twice mid-century, and in 1860 it was completely razed to the ground by flames. Between 1863 and 1864, the Marine Society ordered the reconstruction of the building. The American Civil War was going on and patience was needed.

=== Hotel ===
By 1923, prominent members of the Salem community agreed that the city needed a modern hotel to house the increasing travelers for business. Frank Poor, founder of the Sylvania Lighting Company and North Shore native, was the most outspoken about ideas about the hotel. Construction of the hotel as it is today began in 1924, and on July 23 the following year the hotel was inaugurated and opened to the public as the Hotel Hawthorne. The Salem Marine Society was able to rebuild their headquarters into the Hotel.

In the 1950s, the hotel temporarily changed its name to Hawthorne Motor Hotel due to the growing demand for cars. It became a member of the Historic Hotels of America in 1991.
