= Robert Hale Ives Goddard =

American politician

- Goddard, 1909
- Born: September 21, 1837; Providence, Rhode Island, U.S.
- Died: April 22, 1916 (aged 78); Providence, Rhode Island, U.S.
- Education: Brown University
- Spouse: Rebekah Burnet Groesbeck (m. 1870; died 1914)
- Children: 3, including Madeleine Ives Goddard
- Parent(s): William Giles Goddard; Charlotte Rhoda Ives Goddard
- Relatives: Thomas Poynton Ives (grandfather); Moses Brown Ives (uncle)

Robert Hale Ives Goddard (September 21, 1837 – April 22, 1916) was a prominent banker, industrialist, U.S. Army officer, state senator and philanthropist.

== Early life ==
He was born in Providence, Rhode Island, on September 21, 1837. He was a son of William Giles Goddard and Charlotte Rhoda (née Ives) Goddard. Among his siblings was brother, William Goddard, who also served in the Civil War as a major in the 1st Rhode Island Infantry and was breveted to the rank of colonel for meritorious service during the war. His maternal grandfather, Thomas Poynton Ives, was a prominent merchant who founded Brown & Ives with his brother-in-law, Nicholas Brown Jr.

He graduated from Brown University with a Bachelor of Arts degree in 1858.

== Career ==
Goddard served with distinction in the Union Army during the Civil War. He enlisted as a private in the 1st Rhode Island Detached Militia (a.k.a. 1st Rhode Island Volunteer Infantry) on April 17, 1861, and was mustered out at the end of the regiment's term of service on August 2, 1861.

Goddard was commissioned as a lieutenant on September 11, 1862, and served as an aide-de-camp to General Ambrose Burnside. During the war he fought at the battles of Fredericksburg, Cumberland Gap, Blue Springs and Campbell Station, at the sieges of Knoxville and Petersburg, and was present for Lee's surrender at Appomattox. He was promoted to the rank of captain on March 11, 1863, and received brevets (honorary promotions) to major and lieutenant colonel for gallantry and meritorious service during the siege of Knoxville, Tennessee and the assault before Fort Sedgwick, Virginia.

Goddard resigned from the Army at the end of the war on July 3, 1865. Goddard was elected a Companion of the Massachusetts Commandery of the Military Order of the Loyal Legion of the United States (MOLLUS), a social and patriotic organization for officers who had served in the Union armed forces during the Civil War.

=== Other military service ===
After the war, Goddard served as military aide, with the rank of colonel, to four governors from 1874 to 1883. In 1874 he was elected commander of the 1st Light Infantry Regiment - a chartered militia unit whose membership was largely from the leading families of Providence. Goddard led the regiment when it went to the Centennial Exposition in Philadelphia in July 1876 as a member of the Centennial Legion of Historic Military Commands. Goddard remained in command of the 1st Light Infantry until his resignation in 1883.

On June 24, 1886, he had the honor of serving as the chief marshal of parade to celebrate the 250th anniversary of the founding of Rhode Island.

=== Postwar career ===
After the war Goddard was engaged in textile manufacturing as president of the Goddard Brothers Company, known as Goddard Mills in Lonsdale, Rhode Island. He was a long serving director of the Rhode Island Hospital Trust Company and owned a controlling interest in the Providence and Worcester Railroad.

Goddard served in the Rhode Island Senate as an Independent from 1907 to 1908, as a member of the finance committee and as chairman of the education committee. He had political roots in the Republican Party but was well known as the leader of the Lincoln Party in Rhode Island, a short-lived anti-corruption movement in opposition to prominent politician Charles R. Brayton. He was a staunch supporter of Rhode Island Governor James H. Higgins, a notable political reformer.

He unsuccessfully ran for a seat in the United States Senate in 1907 as a Democrat in a three-way race against Samuel P. Colt and veteran Republican Senator George P. Wetmore.

== Personal life ==
On January 26, 1870, Goddard married Rebekah Burnet Groesbeck (1840–1914). Rebekah was the daughter of U.S. Representative William Slocum Groesbeck and Elizabeth (née Burnet) Groesbeck of Cincinnati, Ohio. Together, they were the parents of three children:

- William Groebeck Goddard (1871–1882), who died young.
- Madeleine Ives Goddard (1874–1931), who married René d'Andigné, Marquis d'Andigné in 1906.
- Robert Hale Ives Goddard Jr. (1880–1959), who married Margaret Hazard, granddaughter of Rowland G. Hazard, and was involved with Brown & Ives, the family investment firm.

Goddard died in Providence on April 23, 1916.

=== Legacy ===
On June 1, 1908, he presented to Brown University a statue of Marcus Aurelius in honor of his deceased brother Moses Brown Ives Goddard (Brown 1854). The statue stands at the rear of Sayles Hall facing Thayer Street.

Goddard's 489.2-acre (1.980 km^{2}) estate in the Potowomut neighborhood of Warwick, Rhode Island, was deeded to the State of Rhode Island in 1927 by the Goddard family. It is now the grounds of Goddard Memorial State Park.
