= William S. Groesbeck =

American lawyer and politician (1815–1897)

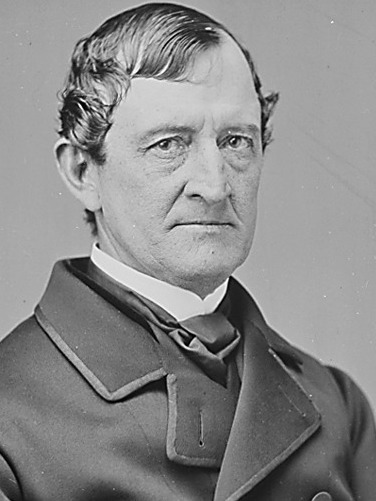

Member of the U.S. House of Representatives from Ohio's 2nd district
- In office March 4, 1857 – March 3, 1859
- Preceded by: John Scott Harrison
- Succeeded by: John A. Gurley

Member of the Ohio Senate from the 1st district
- In office January 6, 1862 – January 3, 1864 Serving with Benjamin Eggleston; Thomas H. Whetstone
- Preceded by: Thomas W. Key; George W. Holmes; E. A. Ferguson
- Succeeded by: Thomas H. Weasner; Benjamin Eggleston; Thomas H. Whetstone

Personal details
- Born: William Slocum Groesbeck; July 24, 1815 Kinderhook, New York
- Died: July 7, 1897 (aged 81) Cincinnati, Ohio
- Resting place: Spring Grove Cemetery
- Party: Democratic
- Spouse: Elizabeth Burnet
- Relations: Madeleine Ives Goddard (granddaughter)
- Education: Augusta College (Kentucky); Miami University

William Slocum Groesbeck (July 24, 1815 – July 7, 1897) was an American lawyer and politician who served one term as a U.S. representative from Ohio from 1857 to 1859.

== Early life ==
Groesbeck was born in Kinderhook, New York, on July 24, 1815. He was the son of John H. Groesbeck (1790–1862) and Mary (née Slocum) Groesbeck (1794–1854). The Groesbeck family was originally from Amsterdam. William's sister, Margaret Groesbeck, was married to his wife's brother, Robert Wallace Burnet. Through the marriage of his sister, Olivia Augusta Groesbeck, he was the brother-in-law of prominent Civil War general Joseph Hooker.

Groesbeck moved with his parents to Cincinnati, Ohio, in 1816. He attended the common schools and Augusta College in Kentucky. He was graduated from Miami University, Oxford, Ohio, in 1835 and was responsible for founding the Miami University chapter of Alpha Delta Phi, the first fraternity chapter west of the Allegheny Mountains.

== Career ==
He studied law and was a law clerk in the office of Salmon P. Chase (later the Governor of Ohio and Secretary of the Treasury during the Lincoln administration). He was admitted to the bar in 1836 and commenced practice in Cincinnati, Ohio.

In 1851, he served as member of the State constitutional convention and, in 1852, he served as commissioner to codify the laws of Ohio. Groesbeck was elected to succeed John Scott Harrison as a Democrat to the Thirty-fifth Congress, serving one term from March 4, 1857, to March 3, 1859. He was an unsuccessful candidate against John A. Gurley for reelection in 1858 to the Thirty-sixth Congress.

He served as member of the Peace Convention of 1861 held in Washington, D.C., in an effort to devise means to prevent the impending war. From 1862 to 1864, he served in the Ohio State Senate and in 1866, he served as delegate to the Union National Convention at Philadelphia.

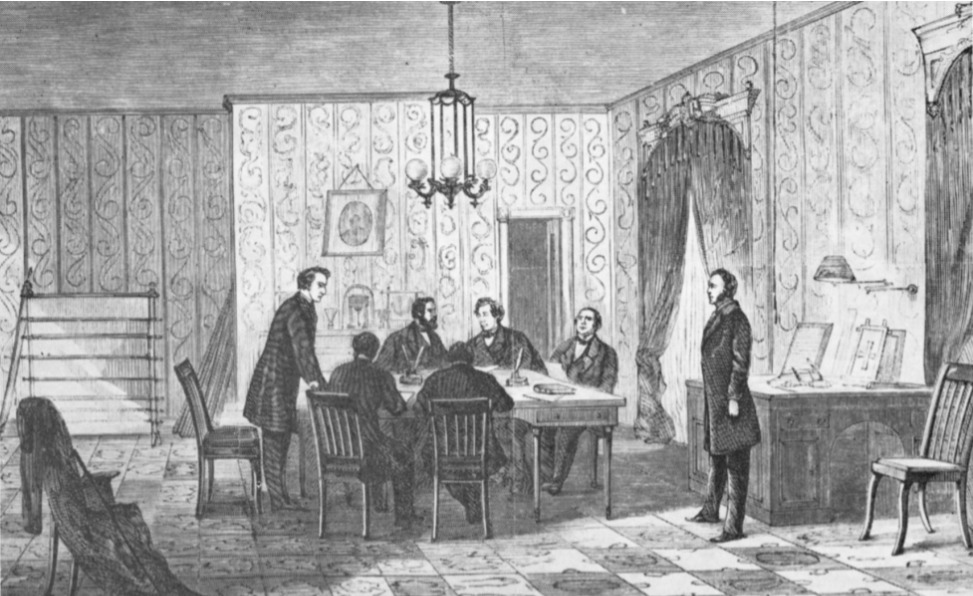
Illustration of President Johnson consulting with his counsel for his impeachment trial

He was one of U.S. President Andrew Johnson's counsel in his impeachment trial in 1868.

In 1872, he was nominated for president of the United States by Liberal Republicans who were displeased with Horace Greeley, but his ticket was forgotten during the excitement of the campaign, at the end of which he received one electoral vote for vice-president. He served as delegate to the International Monetary Conference in Paris, France, in 1878.

== Personal life ==
Groesbeck married Elizabeth Burnet (1818–1889), daughter of Judge Jacob Burnet. Together, they were the parents of:

- Mary Groesbeck (1838–1852), who died in childhood.
- Rebecca Burnet Groesbeck (1840–1914), who married Robert Hale Ives Goddard.
- Elizabeth Burnet Groesbeck, who married Kenelm Henry Digby.
- Jacob Burnet Groesbeck (1842–1858), who died in childhood.
- William John Groesbeck (1844–1845), who died in infancy.
- Caroline Thew Groesbeck (1849–1863), who died in childhood.
- Herman John Groesbeck (1849–1925), who married Elizabeth Perry (1850–1924), daughter of Judge Aaron F. Perry.
- Julia Groesbeck (1854–1919), who married Robert Ludlow Fowler (1849–1936) in 1876.
- Telford Groesbeck (1854–1936), who married Louise Bulkeley Cox (1854–1940).

His wife died on April 6, 1889, leaving five living children. Groesbeck died in Cincinnati, Ohio, on July 7, 1897, and was interred in Spring Grove Cemetery.

U.S. House of Representatives
Preceded by John Scott Harrison	United States Representative from Ohio's 2nd congressional district 1857–1859	Succeeded by John A. Gurley
Ohio Senate
Preceded by Thomas W. Key, George W. Holmes, E. A. Ferguson	Senator from 1st District; 1862-1863; Served alongside: Benjamin Eggleston, Thomas H. Whetstone	Succeeded by Thomas H. Weasner, Benjamin Eggleston, Thomas H. Whetstone
