= Caleb Ormsbee =

American architect

- Born: October 15, 1752; Rehoboth, Massachusetts
- Died: December 31, 1807 (aged 55); Providence, Rhode Island
- Occupation: Architect
- Buildings: Nightingale-Brown House, Thomas P. Ives House

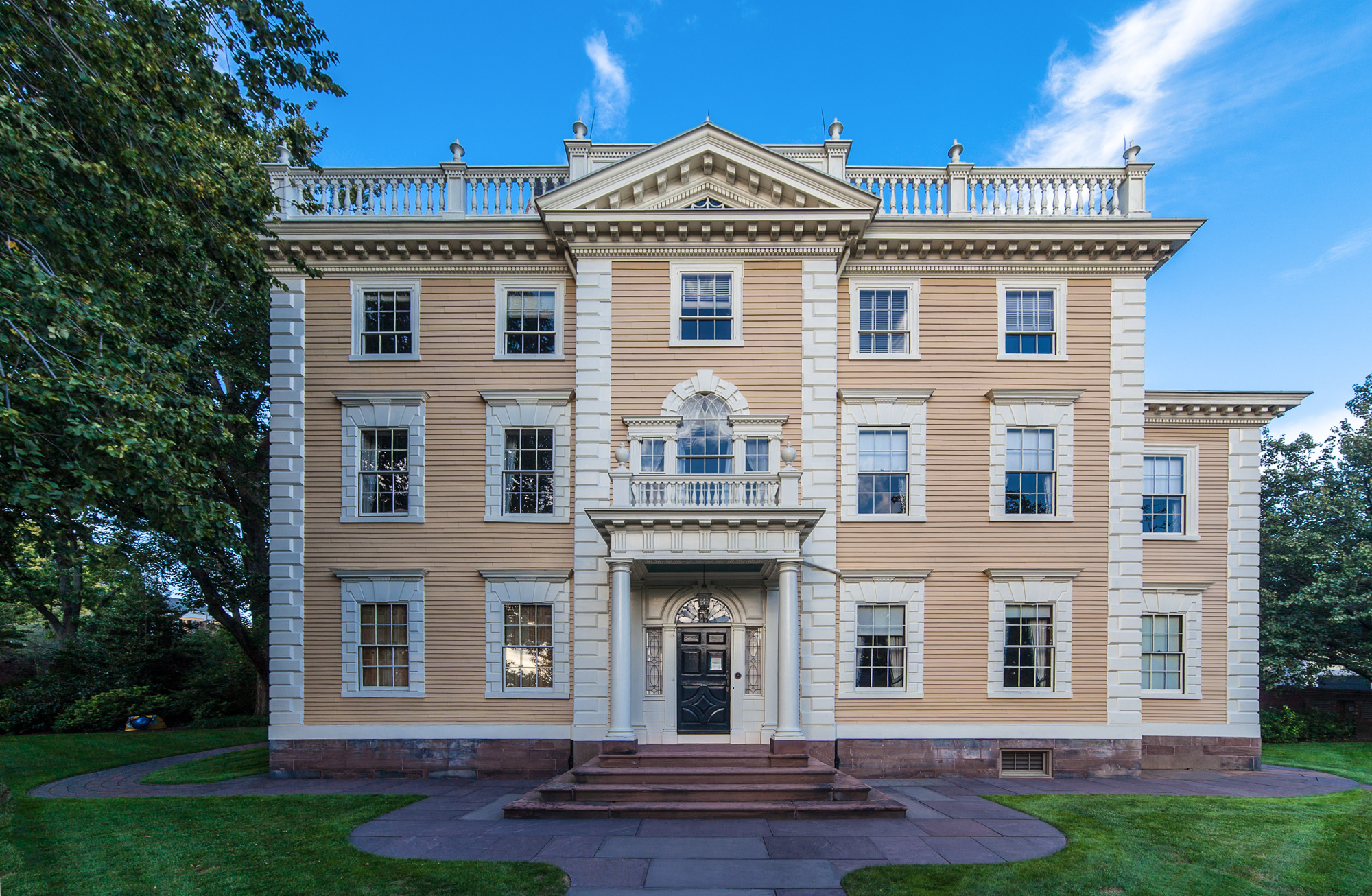
House for Joseph Nightingale, Providence, Rhode Island, 1791–92.

Caleb Ormsbee (1752–1807) was an American master builder and architect of Providence, Rhode Island. Two of his buildings have been designated United States National Historic Landmarks.

== Life and career ==
Ormsbee was born October 15, 1752, in Rehoboth, Massachusetts to Daniel and Keziah (Cummings) Ormsbee. His training is unknown, but he may have served his apprenticeship with Jonathan Hammond, (Note: Also spelled Jonathan Hammon.) a carpenter who was associated with Joseph Brown in designing and building the First Baptist Church in America in 1774.

Ormsbee was self-trained in design. He is known to have owned a copy of A Book of Architecture, published by James Gibbs in 1728, which he is believed to have purchased from the estate of Joseph Brown. He also looked to contemporary American architecture, and based his design for the 1795 building of the First Congregational Church on the Hollis Street Church in Boston, designed by Charles Bulfinch and built in 1788.

John Holden Greene was an apprentice of Ormsbee beginning in 1794, and remained in his employ until his death in 1807.

== Personal life ==
In 1774 Ormsbee married Molly Walker, also a Rehoboth native.

Ormsbee died December 31, 1807, in Providence.

== Works ==
- Double house for Caleb Ormsbee, (Note: Located at 407-409 Benefit Street. Ormsbee lived in 407 Benefit until his death.) Providence, Rhode Island (1788)
- House for John I. Clark, Providence, Rhode Island (1789, burned 1849)
- House for Joseph Nightingale, Providence, Rhode Island (1791–92, NHL and NRHP 1989)
- First Congregational Church, Providence, Rhode Island (1795, burned 1814)
- House for Thomas P. Ives, Providence, Rhode Island (1803–06, NHP and NRHP 1970)

== Gallery ==
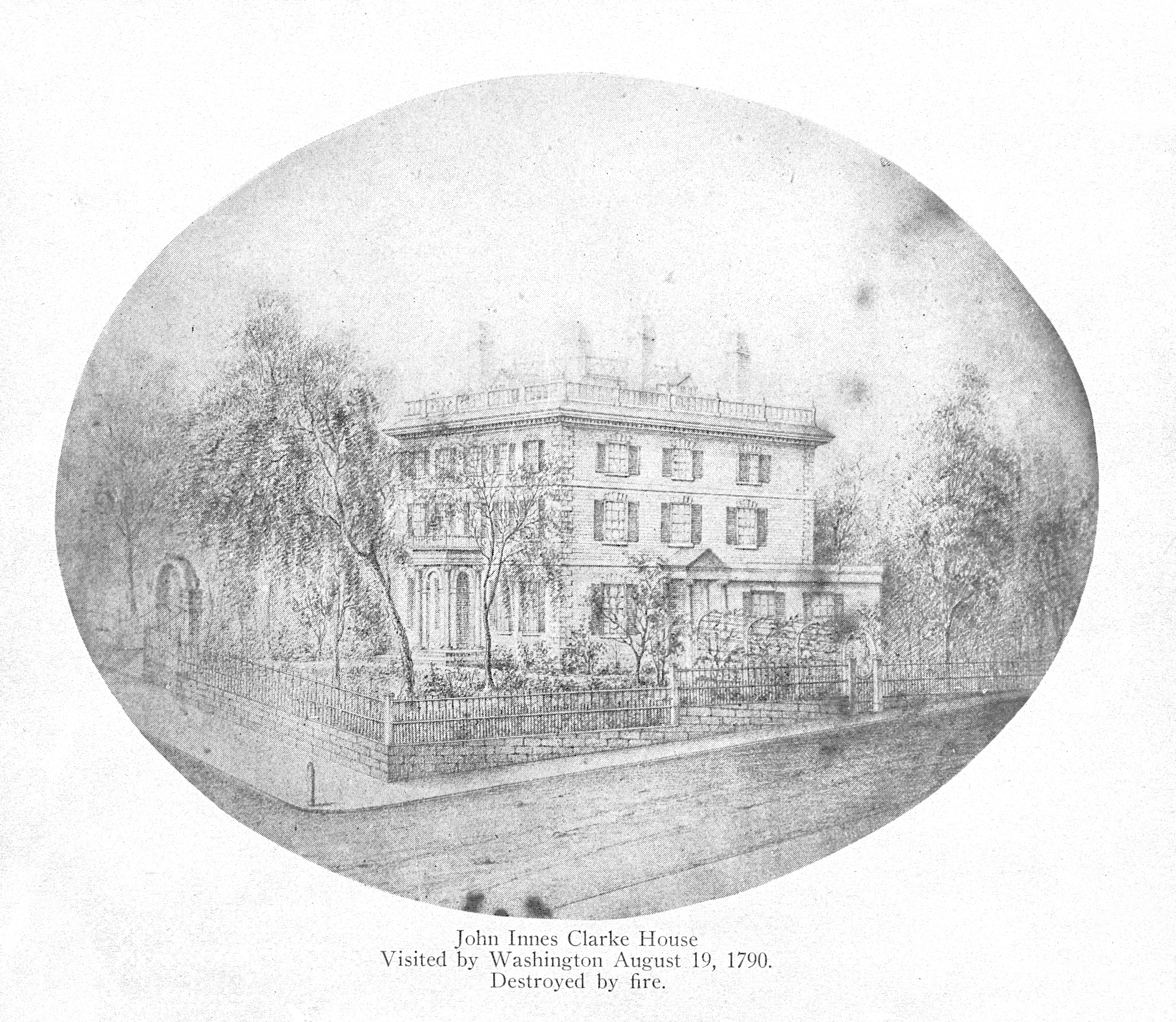
House for John I. Clark, Providence, Rhode Island, 1789.

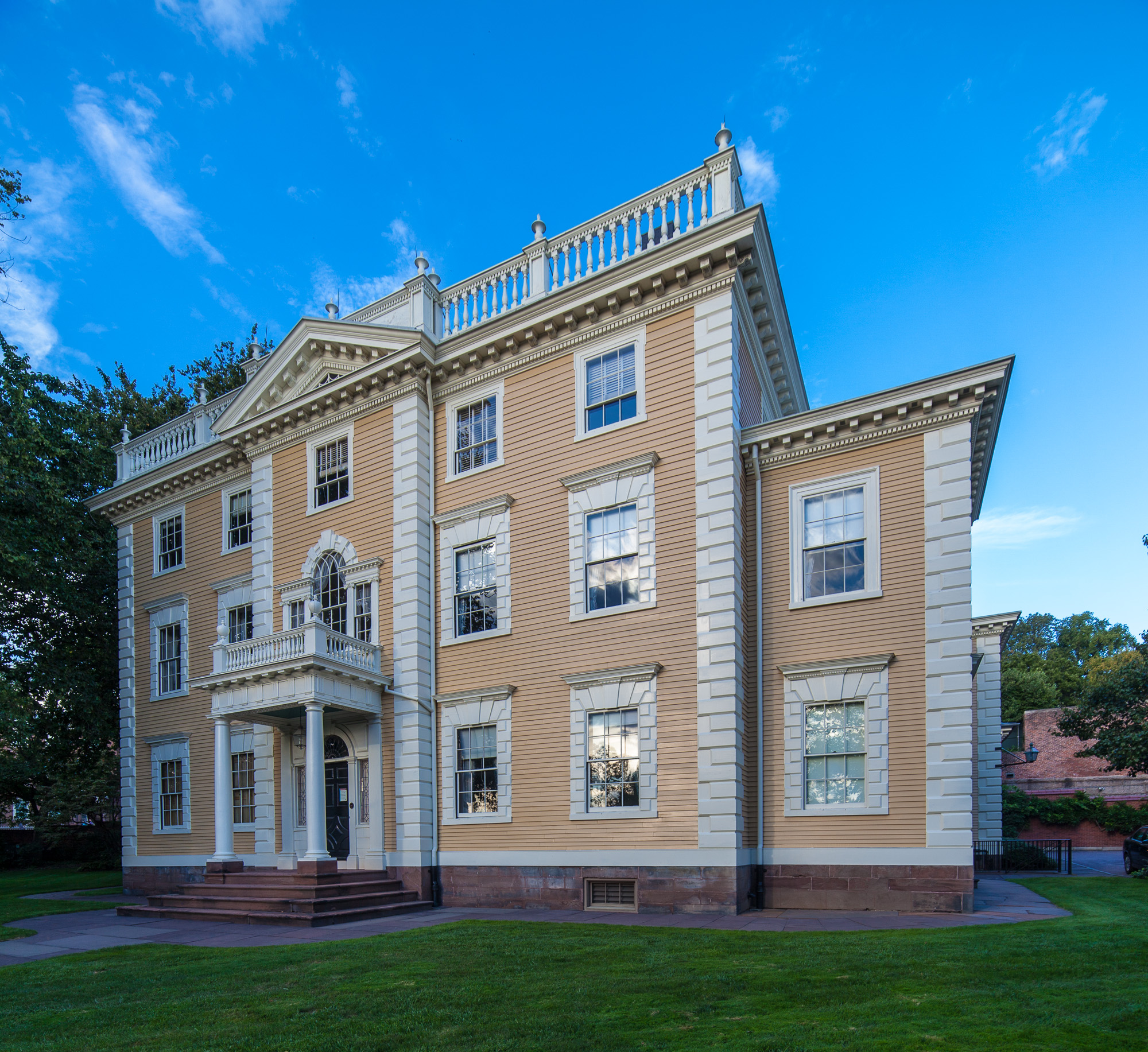
House for Joseph Nightingale, Providence, Rhode Island, 1791-92.

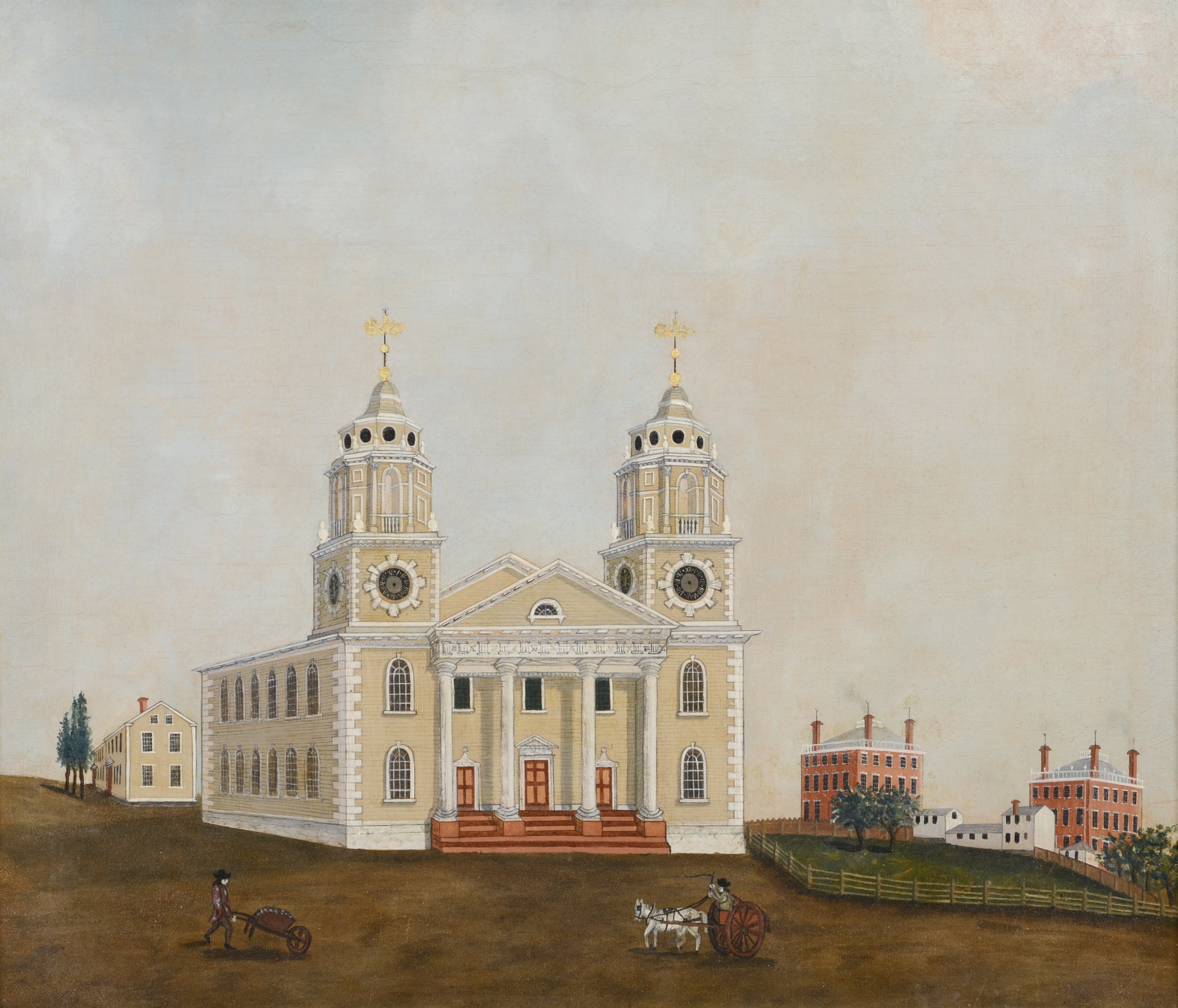
First Congregational Church, Providence, Rhode Island, 1795.

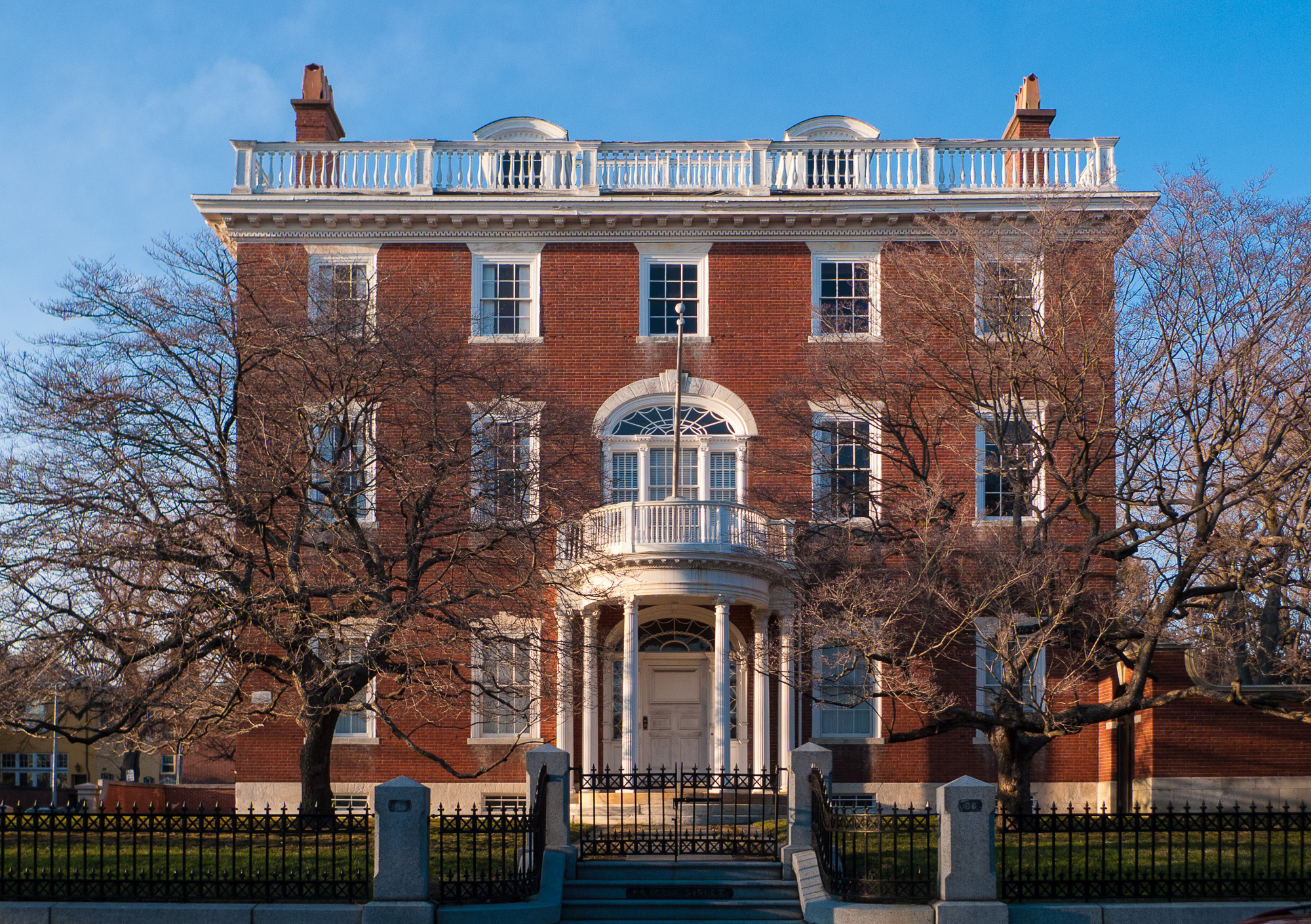
House for Thomas P. Ives, Providence, Rhode Island, 1803.
