= Goddard Memorial State Park =

State park in Kent County, Rhode Island

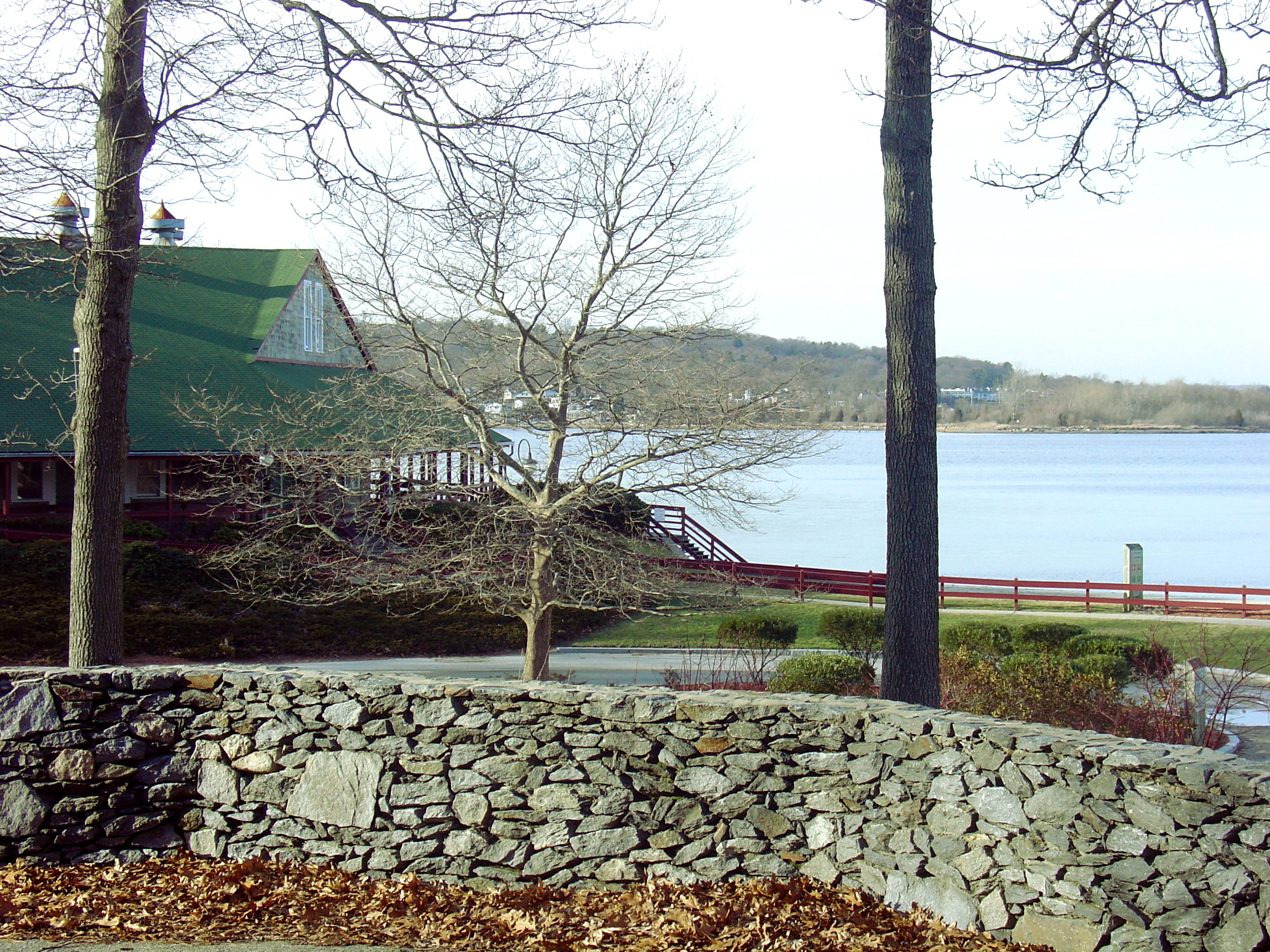

- Location within Rhode Island
- Interactive map of Goddard Memorial State Park
- Location: Warwick, Rhode Island, United States
- Coordinates: 41°39′20″N 71°26′9″W
- Area: 489.2 acres (198.0 ha)
- Elevation: 39 ft (12 m)
- Established: 1927
- Named for: Col. Robert Goddard
- Administrator: Rhode Island Department of Environmental Management, Division of Parks & Recreation
- Website: Official website
- Rhode Island State Parks

Goddard Memorial State Park is a public recreation area occupying 490 acres (200 ha) along the shores of Greenwich Cove and Greenwich Bay in Warwick, Rhode Island. The state park grounds were once the estate of Civil War officer and Rhode Island politician Robert Goddard, whose children gave the land to the state in 1927 as a memorial to their father. The park features a nine-hole golf course, an equestrian area with 18 miles (29 km) of bridle trails, swimming beach, canoeing area, picnicking facilities, game fields, and a performing arts center.
