= Salem Marine Society =

The Salem Marine Society (est. 1766) is a seafarers charity in Salem, Massachusetts. Around 1836, the group acquired the Franklin Building on Washington Square West and Essex Street as their headquarters, which was eventually rebuilt into the Hawthorne Hotel.
